= Shizuoka Prefecture =

Prefecture of Japan

Shizuoka Prefecture 静岡県
- Prefecture

Japanese transcription(s)
  - Japanese: 静岡県
  - Rōmaji: Shizuoka-ken
- Flag Symbol
- Anthem: "Shizuoka kenka" and "Fuji yo yume yo tomo yo"
- Coordinates: 34°55′N 138°19′E
- Country: Japan
- Region: Chūbu (Tōkai)
- Island: Honshu
- Capital: Shizuoka
- Largest city: Hamamatsu
- Subdivisions: Districts: 5, Municipalities: 35

Government
  - Governor: Yasutomo Suzuki

Area
  - Total: 7,777.42 km^{2} (3,002.88 sq mi)
  - Rank: 13th
- Highest elevation (Mount Fuji): 3,778 m (12,395 ft)

Population (1 September 2023)
  - Total: 3,555,818
  - Rank: 10th
  - Density: 457.198/km^{2} (1,184.14/sq mi)
  - Dialect: Shizuoka dialect

GDP
  - Total: JP¥ 18,271 billion US$ 134.9 billion (2022)
- ISO 3166 code: JP-22
- Website: www.pref.shizuoka.jp/a_foreign/english
- Symbols of Japan
- Bird: Japanese paradise flycatcher (Terpsiphone atrocaudata)
- Flower: Azalea (Rhododendron)
- Tree: Sweet osmanthus (Osmanthus fragrans var. aurantiacus)

Shizuoka Prefecture (静岡県, Shizuoka-ken; Japanese pronunciation: [ɕì.(d͡)zɨ́.ò̞.kä̀, -ó̞.kä́.kè̞ɴ̀]) is a prefecture of Japan located in the Chūbu region of Honshu. As of October 2026, Shizuoka Prefecture has a population of 3,435,185 and has a geographic area of 7,777.42 km^{2} (3,002.88 sq mi). Shizuoka Prefecture borders Kanagawa Prefecture to the east, Yamanashi Prefecture to the northeast, Nagano Prefecture to the north, and Aichi Prefecture to the west.

Shizuoka is the capital and Hamamatsu is the largest city in Shizuoka Prefecture, with other major cities including Fuji, Numazu, and Iwata. Shizuoka Prefecture is located on Japan's Pacific Ocean coast and features Suruga Bay formed by the Izu Peninsula, and Lake Hamana which is considered to be one of Japan's largest lakes. Mount Fuji, the tallest volcano in Japan and cultural icon of the country, is partially located in Shizuoka Prefecture on the border with Yamanashi Prefecture. Shizuoka Prefecture has a significant motoring heritage as the founding location of Honda, Suzuki, and Yamaha, and is home to the Fuji International Speedway.

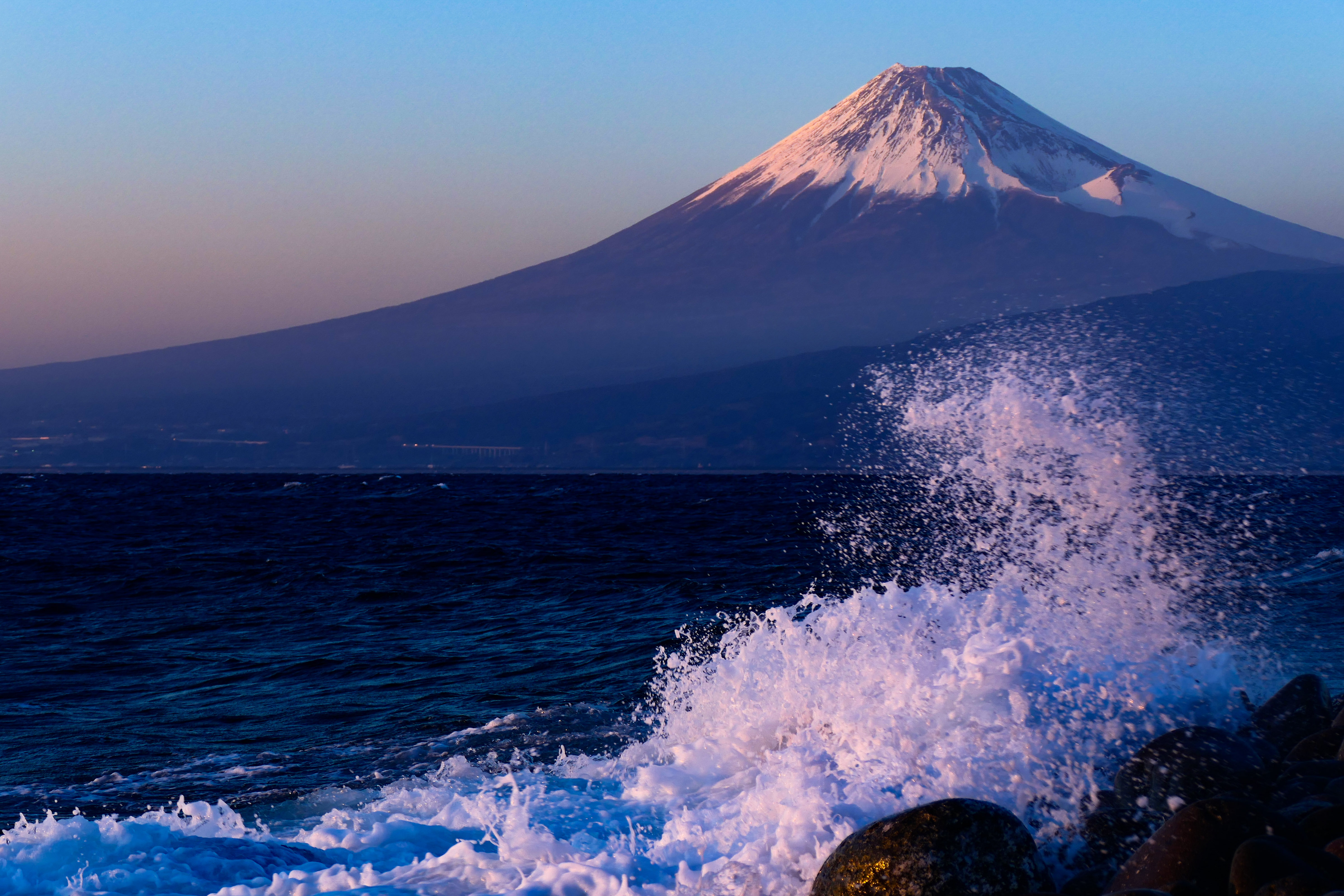
View of Mt. Fuji from Numazu

== History ==
Shizuoka Prefecture was established from the former Tōtōmi, Suruga and Izu provinces.

The area was the home of the first Tokugawa shōgun. Tokugawa Ieyasu held the region until he conquered the lands of the Hōjō clan in the Kantō region and placed land under the stewardship of Toyotomi Hideyoshi. After becoming shōgun, Tokugawa took the land back for his family and put the area around modern-day Shizuoka City under the direct supervision of the shogunate. With the creation of the Shizuoka han from the Sunpu Domain in 1868, it once again became the residence of the Tokugawa family.

== Geography ==
Shizuoka Prefecture is an elongated region following the coast of the Pacific Ocean at the Suruga Bay. In the west, the prefecture extends deep into the Japan Alps. In the east, it becomes a narrower coast bounded in the north by Mount Fuji, until it comes to the Izu Peninsula, a popular resort area pointing south into the Pacific.

As of April 2012, 11% of the total land area of the prefecture was designated as natural parks, namely the Fuji-Hakone-Izu and Minami Alps National Parks; Tenryū-Okumikawa Quasi-National Park; and four Prefectural Natural Parks.

=== Climate ===
In Shizuoka prefecture, the temperature, over the course of the year, typically varies from 1.1 °C (34 °F) to 30.5 °C (87 °F) and is rarely below -2.2 °C (28 °F) or above 33.8 °C (93 °F.) The summers in Shizuoka are warm, oppressive, and mostly cloudy; the winters are very cold, windy, and mostly clear.

=== Disaster ===
On 15 March 2011, Shizuoka Prefecture was hit with a magnitude 6.2 earthquake approximately 42 km (26 mi) NNE of Shizuoka City. It is said, that throughout history, Shizuoka area has experienced a large earthquake every 100 to 150 years.

=== Demographics ===
Shizuoka prefecture population pyramid in 2020

3,635,220 people live in Shizuoka Prefecture, according to the 2020 census.

=== Municipalities ===
Since 2010, Shizuoka has consisted of 35 municipalities: 23 cities and 12 towns.

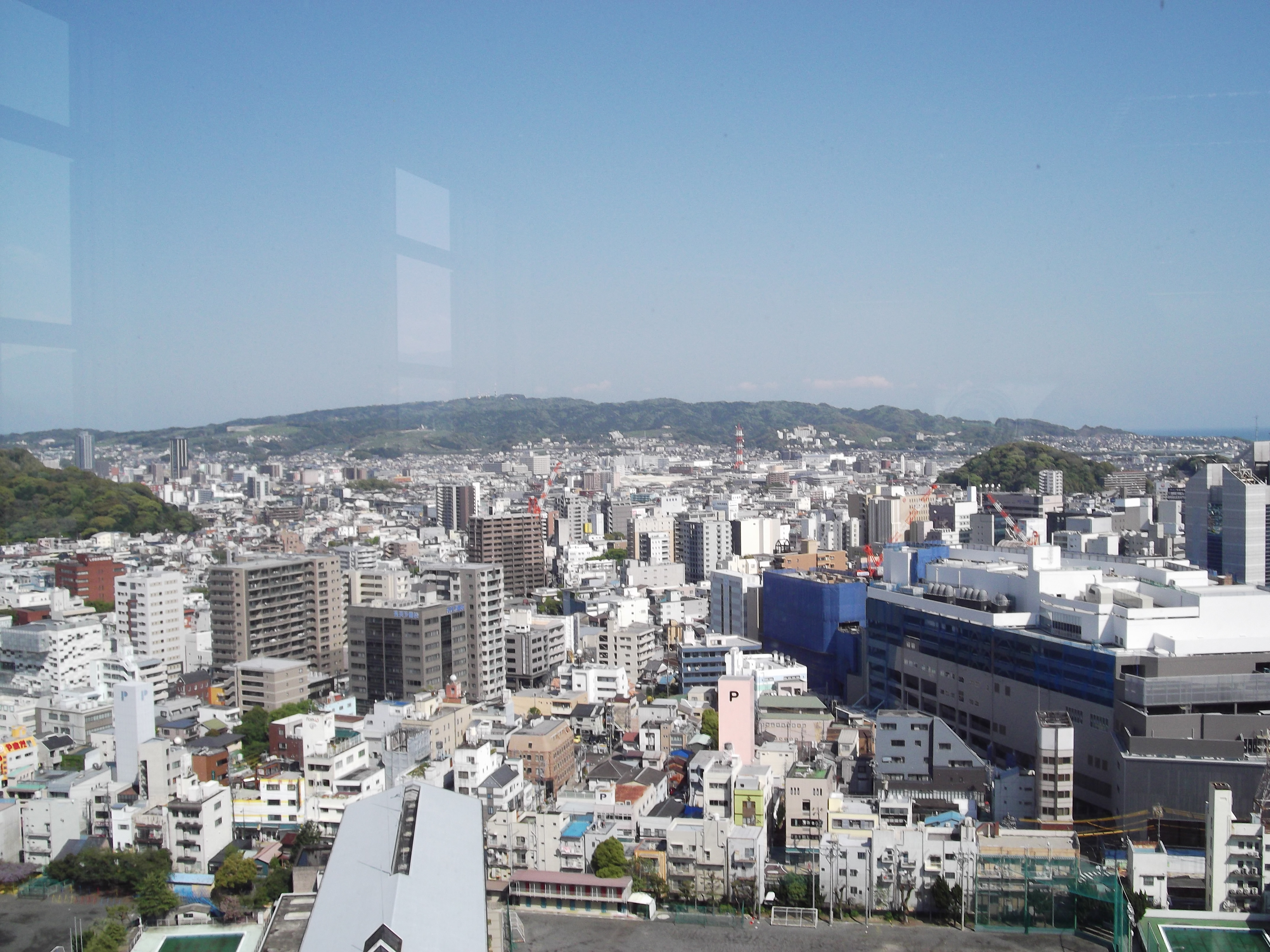
Shizuoka City

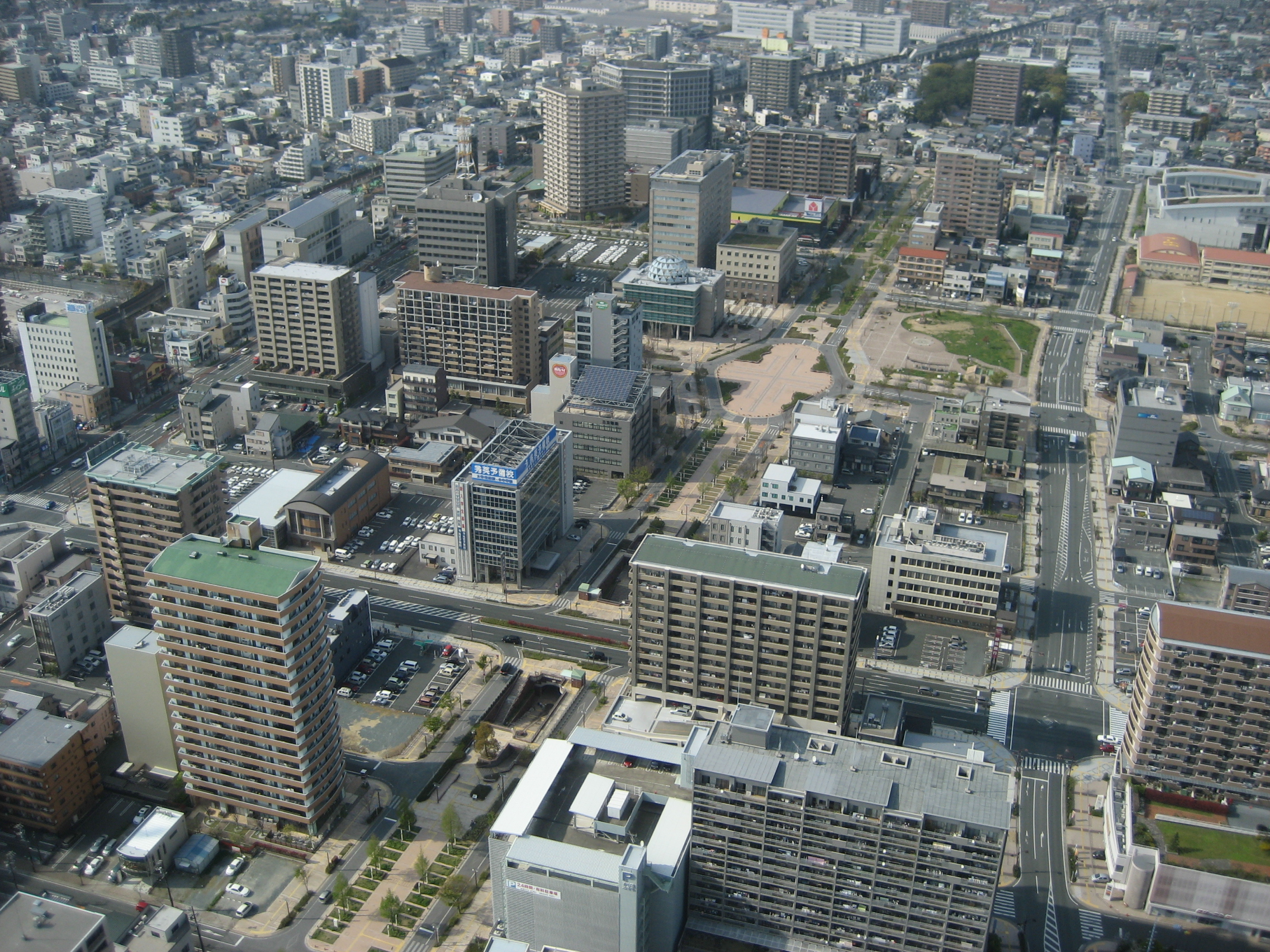
Hamamatsu

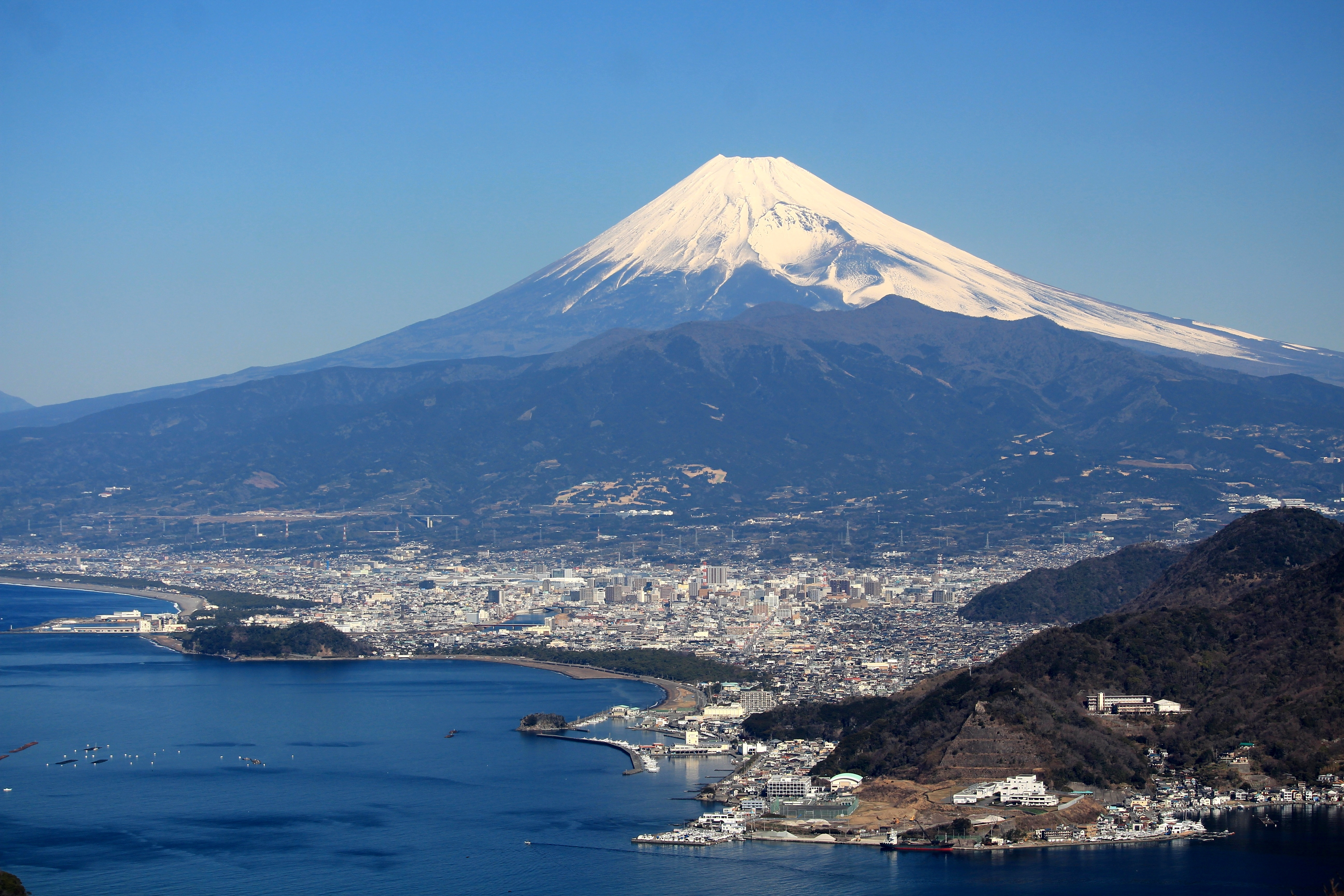
Numazu and Mount Fuji

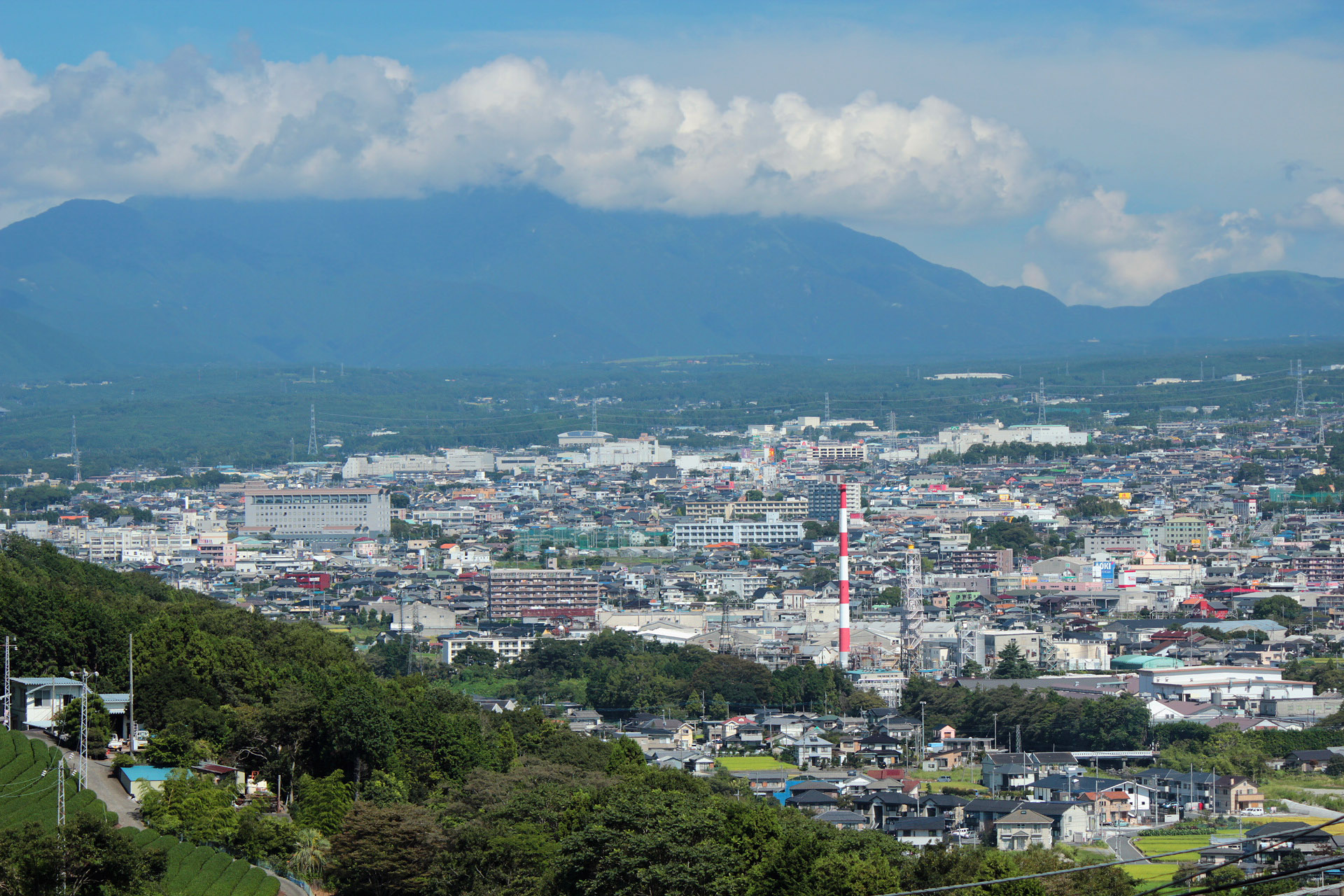
Fujinomiya

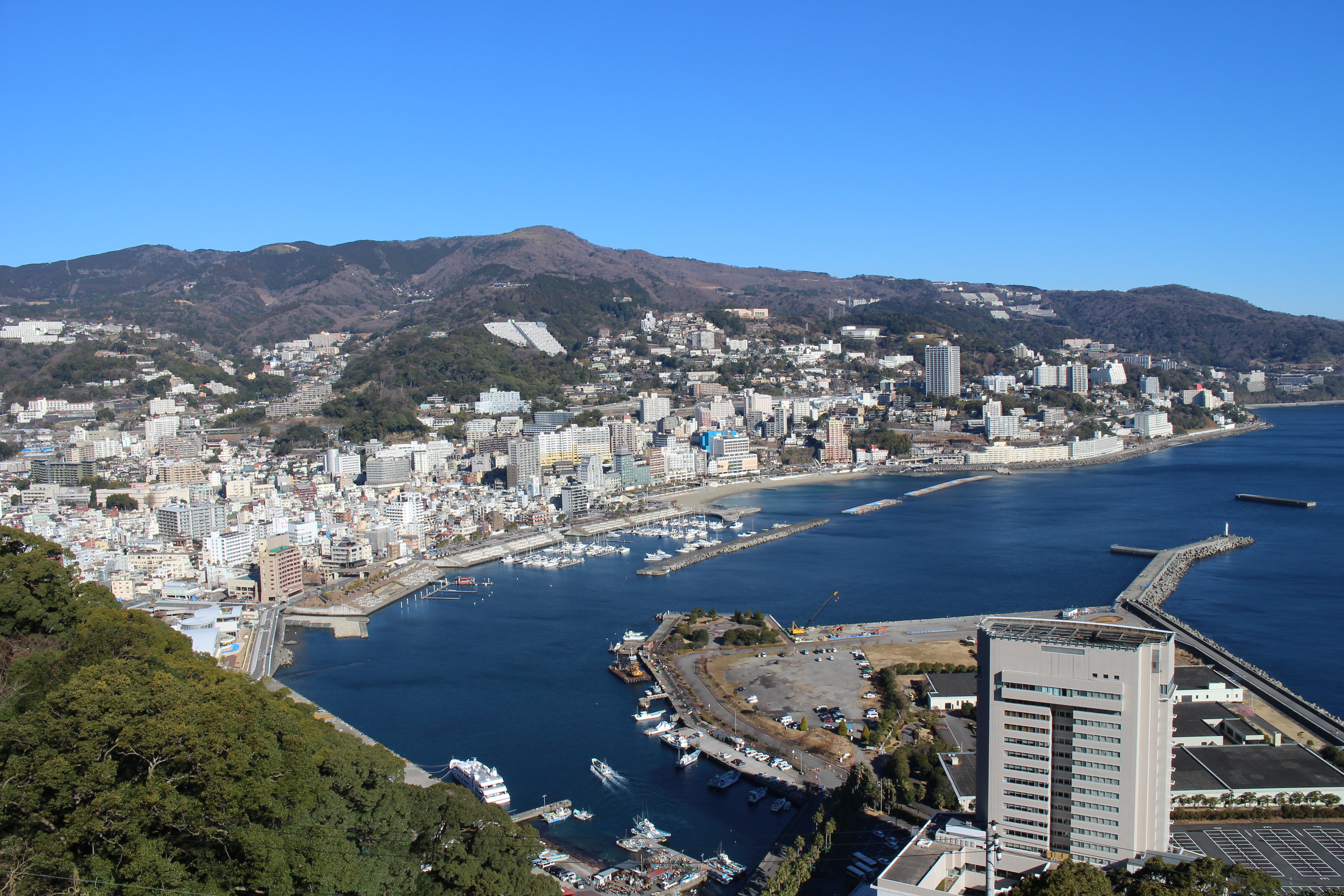
Atami
Municipalities in Shizuoka Prefecture Government Ordinance Designated City City Town

=== Cities ===
23 cities are located in Shizuoka Prefecture:

Name		Area (km^{2})	Population	Map
Rōmaji	Kanji	Area (km^{2})	Population	Map
Atami	熱海市	61.78	34,233	
Fuji	富士市	244.95	245,015	
Fujieda	藤枝市	194.06	145,032	
Fujinomiya	富士宮市	389.08	132,507	
Fukuroi	袋井市	108.33	88,395	
Gotemba	御殿場市	194.90	88,370	
Hamamatsu	浜松市	1,558.06	780,128	
Itō	伊東市	124.10	63,343	
Iwata	磐田市	163.45	166,672	
Izu	伊豆市	363.97	30,678	
Izunokuni	伊豆の国市	94.62	48,579	
Kakegawa	掛川市	265.69	117,925	
Kikugawa	菊川市	94.19	48,484	
Kosai	湖西市	86.56	57,885	
Makinohara	牧之原市	111.69	42,326	
Mishima	三島市	62.02	107,851	
Numazu	沼津市	186.96	189,486	
Omaezaki	御前崎市	65.56	32,422	
Shimada	島田市	315.70	93,724	
Shimoda	下田市	104.71	19,670	
Shizuoka (capital)	静岡市	1,411.90	677,867	
Susono	裾野市	138.12	51,216	
Yaizu	焼津市	70.31	133,916	

=== Towns ===
These are the towns in each district:

Name		Area (km^{2})	Population	District	Map
Rōmaji	Kanji	Area (km^{2})	Population	District	Map
Higashiizu	東伊豆町	77.83	12,155	Kamo District	
Kannami	函南町	65.16	37,782	Tagata District	
Kawanehon	川根本町	496.88	6,731	Haibara District	
Kawazu	河津町	100.79	7,203	Kamo District	
Matsuzaki	松崎町	85.23	6,563	Kamo District	
Minamiizu	南伊豆町	110.58	8,231	Kamo District	
Mori	森町	133.91	18,306	Shūchi District	
Nagaizumi	長泉町	26.63	43,568	Suntō District	
Nishiizu	西伊豆町	105.52	7,798	Kamo District	
Oyama	小山町	135.74	18,458	Suntō District	
Shimizu	清水町	8.81	32,453	Suntō District	
Yoshida	吉田町	20.73	29,593	Haibara District	

=== Mergers ===
After the introduction of modern municipalities in 1889, Shizuoka consisted of 337 municipalities: 1 (by definition: district-independent) city and 23 districts with 31 towns and 305 villages. The Great Shōwa mergers of the 1950s reduced the total from 281 to 97 between 1953 and 1960, including 18 cities by then. The Great Heisei mergers of the 2000s combined the 74 remaining municipalities in the year 2000 into the current 35 by 2010.

== List of governors of Shizuoka (since 1947) ==
#	Name (Birth–Death)	Term of office		Political Party
1	Takeji Kobayashi (小林武治) (1899–1988)	23 April 1947	22 April 1951	Independent
2	Toshio Saito (斎藤寿夫) (1908–1999)	1 May 1951	8 January 1967	Liberal Party (1951–1959); Liberal Democratic Party (1959–1967)
3	Yutaro Takeyama (竹山祐太郎) (1901–1982)	31 January 1967	24 June 1974	LDP
4	Keizaburo Yamamoto (山本敬三郎) (1913–2006)	10 June 1974	6 July 1986	LDP
5	Shigeyoshi Saito (斉藤滋与史) (1918–2018)	7 July 1986	23 June 1993	LDP
6	Yoshinobu Ishikawa (石川嘉延) (born in 1940)	3 August 1993	17 June 2009	Independent
7	Heita Kawakatsu (川勝平太) (born in 1948)	7 July 2009	9 May 2024	Independent
8	Yasutomo Suzuki (鈴木康友) (born in 1957)	28 May 2024	Incumbent	Independent

== Industry ==
Home to a shogun, cherry shrimp, and Japan's green tea heartland. Situated along Suruga Bay between Tokyo and Nagoya on the historic Tokaido route, the Pacific coast city of Shizuoka is known for supplying most of Japan's tea and maguro tuna.

=== Motorcycles ===
Shizuoka-based companies are world leaders in several major industrial sectors. Honda, Yamaha, and Suzuki all have their roots in Shizuoka prefecture and are still manufacturing here. Thanks to this, Shizuoka prefecture accounts for 28% of Japanese motorcycle exports.

=== Musical instruments ===
Yamaha and Kawai are both global piano brands. Yamaha has the largest share in the global piano market. Kawai has the second largest share. They both got their start in Shizuoka prefecture in the early twentieth century.

Yamaha and Roland are major brand for electronic musical instruments. In the electronic piano world market, Yamaha has the world's largest share. Roland and Kawai have the second and third place share. Roland and Yamaha also manufacture high-quality synthesizers and drum machines for professional musicians.

In addition, various instruments such as wind instruments and guitars are manufactured in this prefecture. There are about 200 companies that manufacture musical instruments, in this prefecture.

Most of these musical instruments are especially produced in Hamamatsu City.

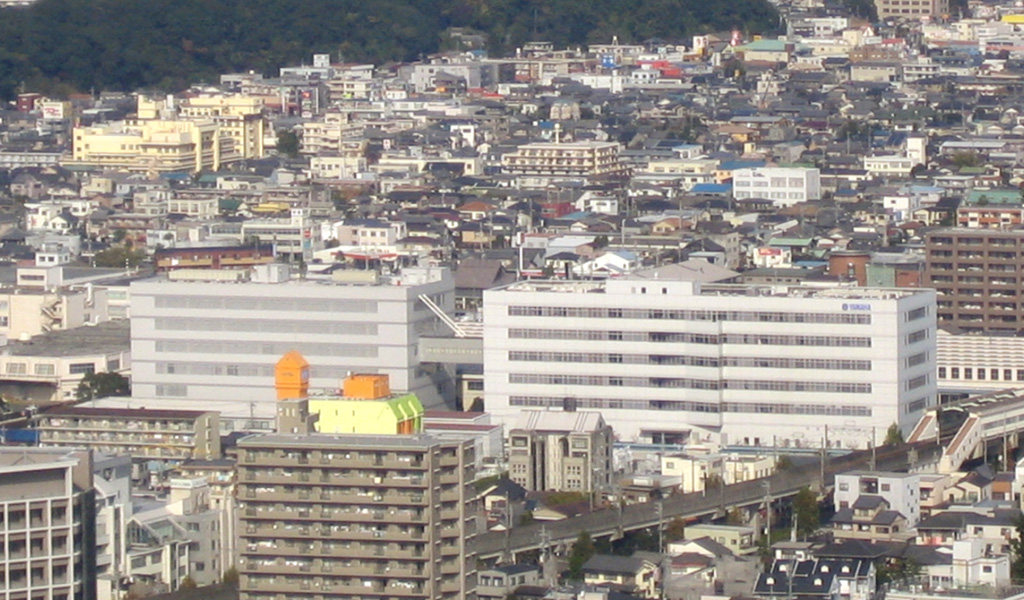
Yamaha headquarters

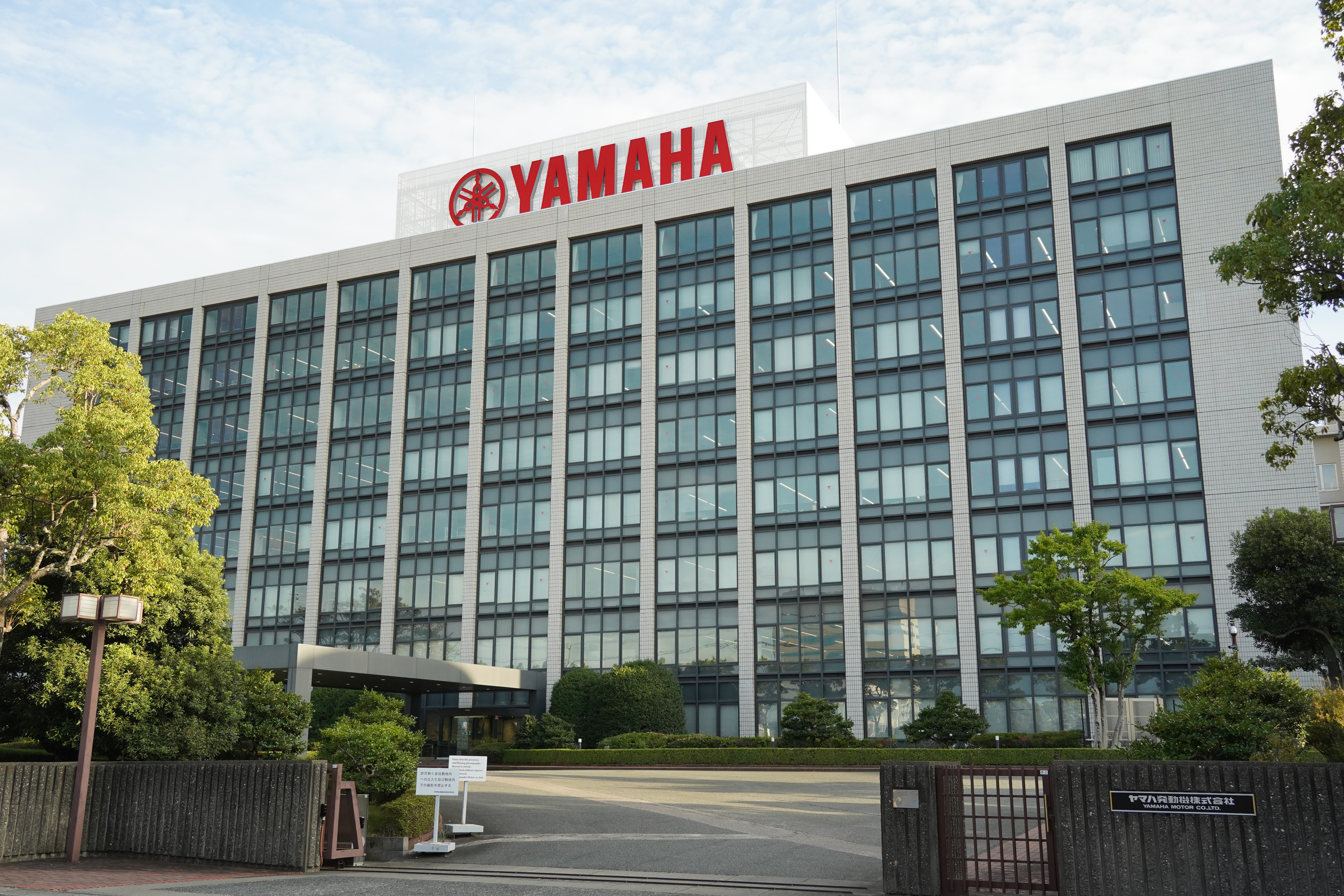
Yamaha Motor headquarters

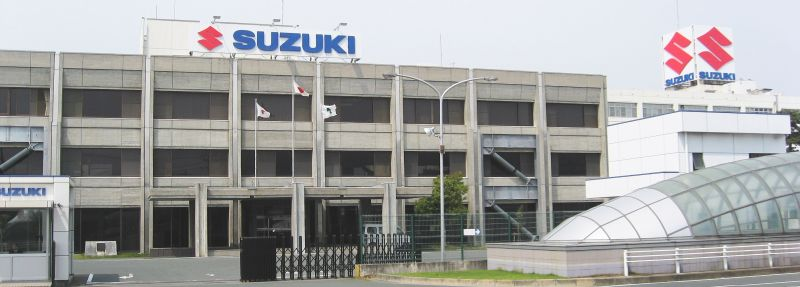
Suzuki headquarters

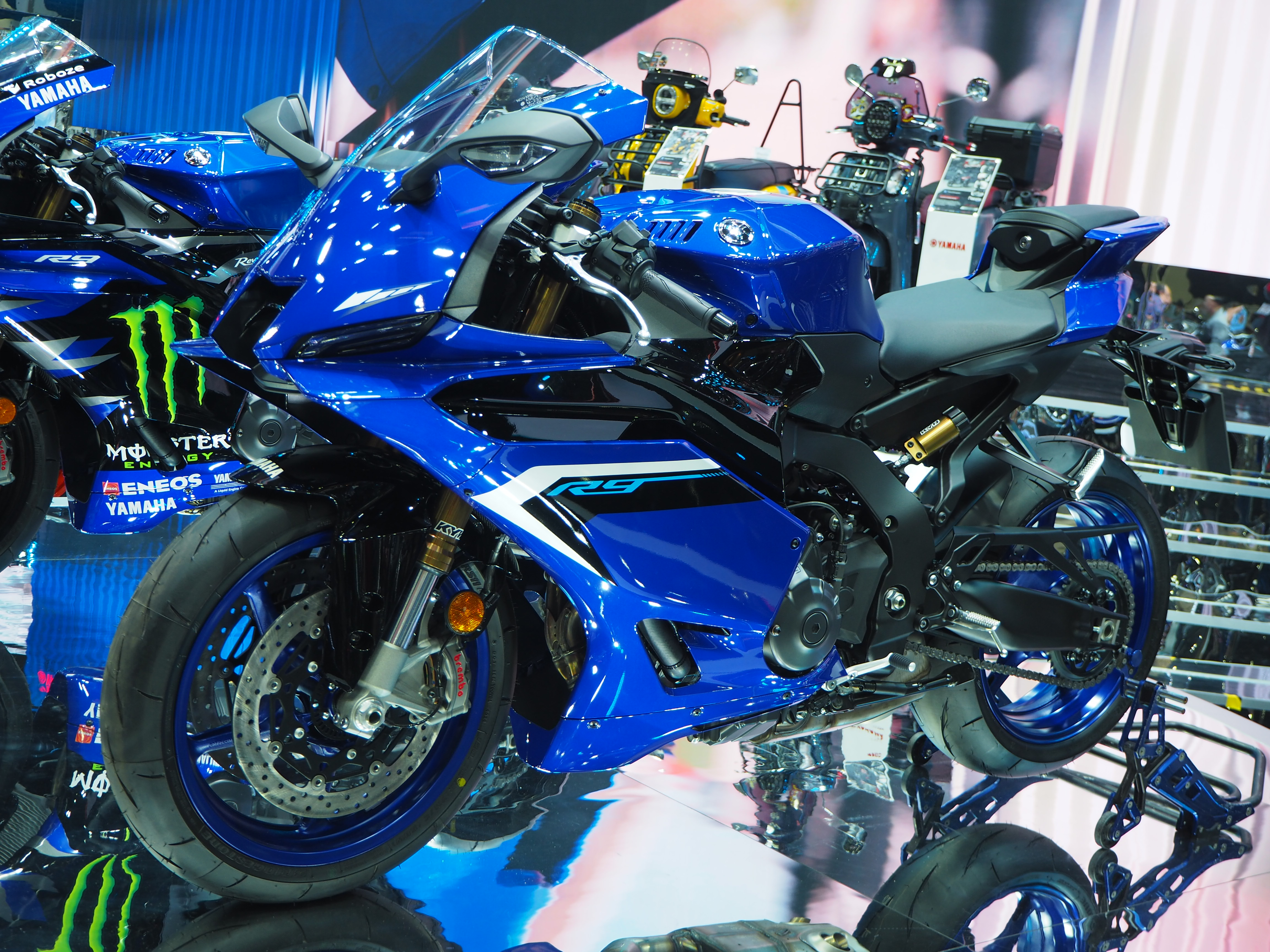
Yamaha motorcycles

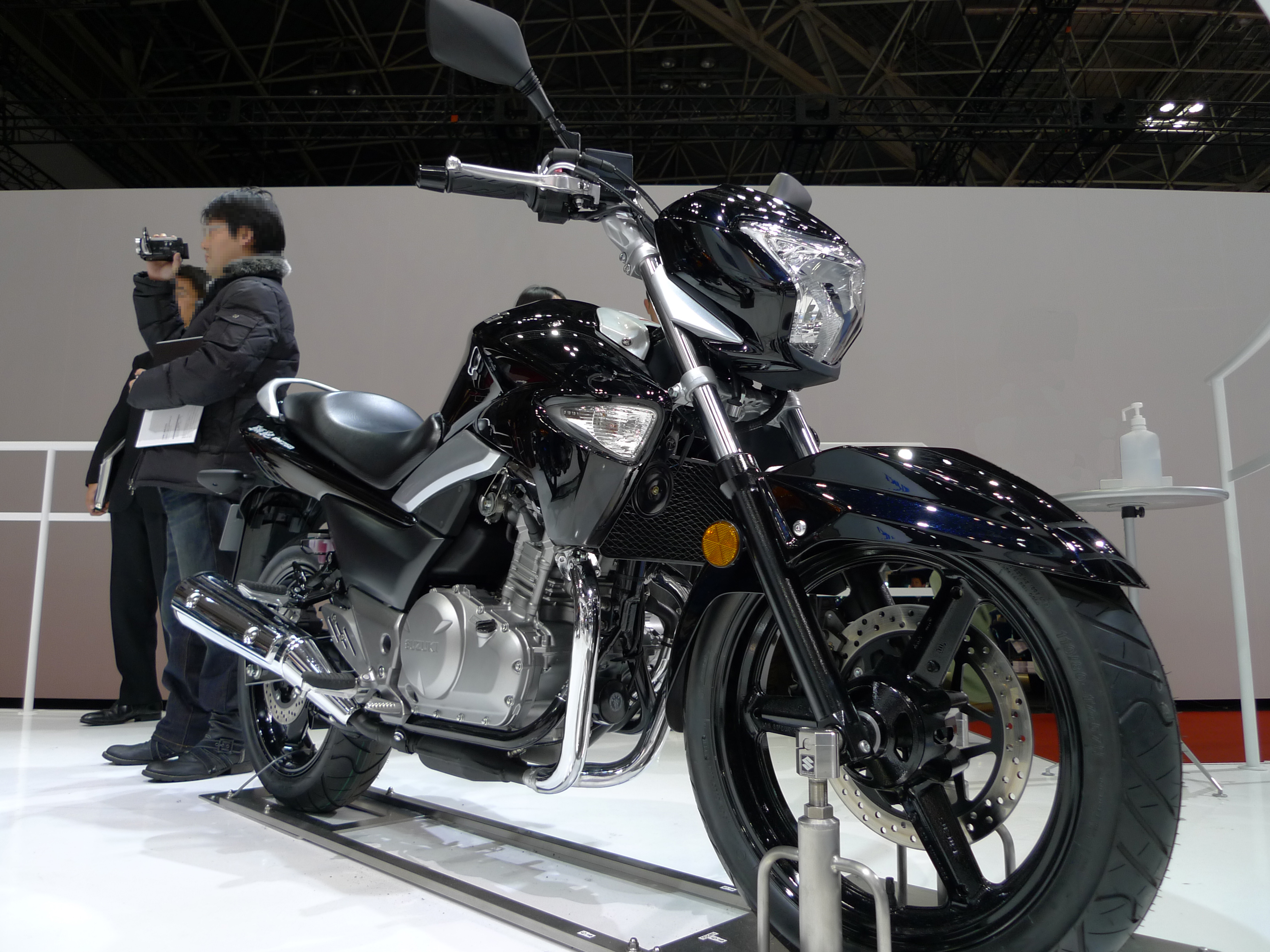
Suzuki motorcycles

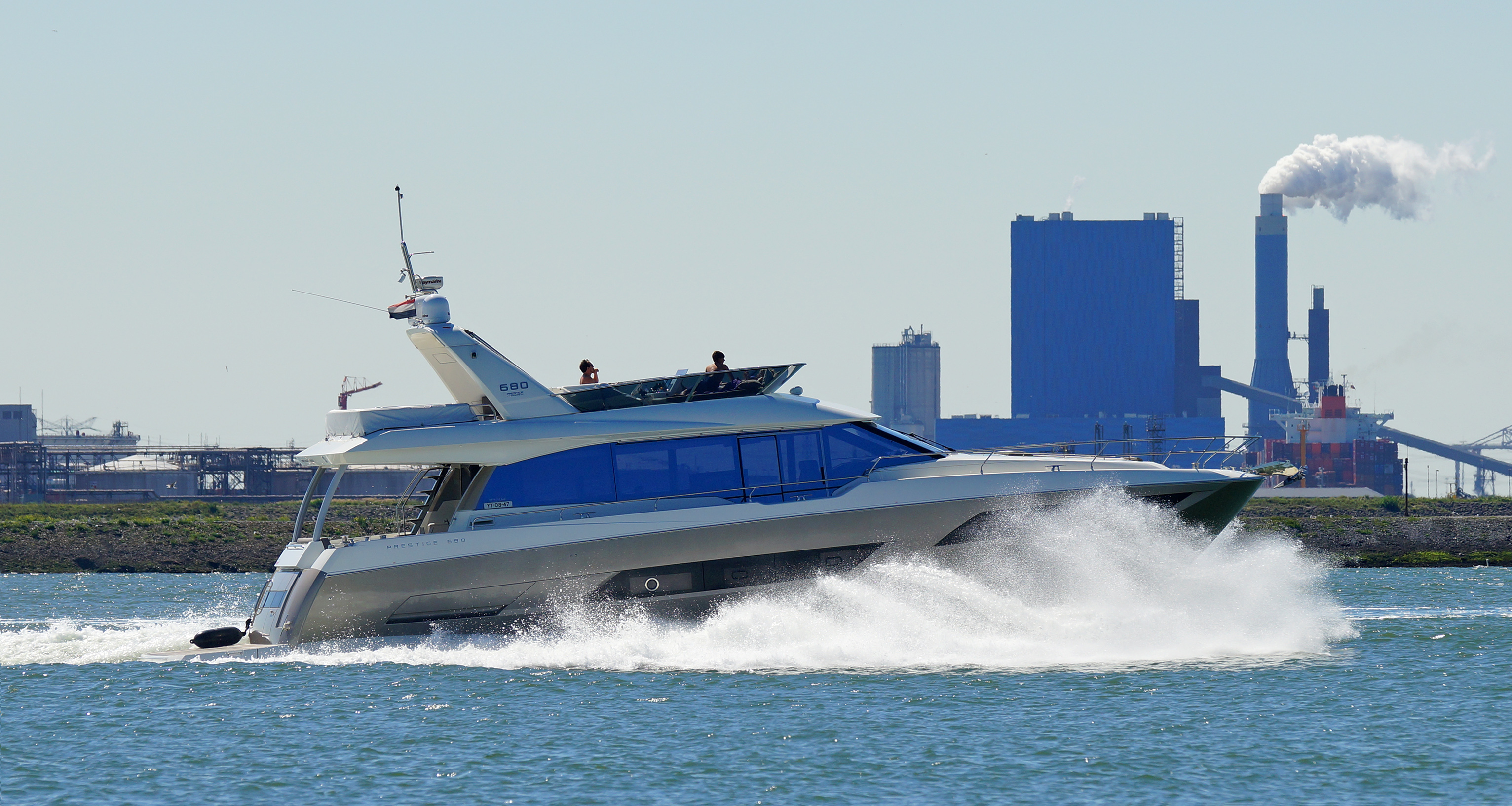
Yamaha Yacht

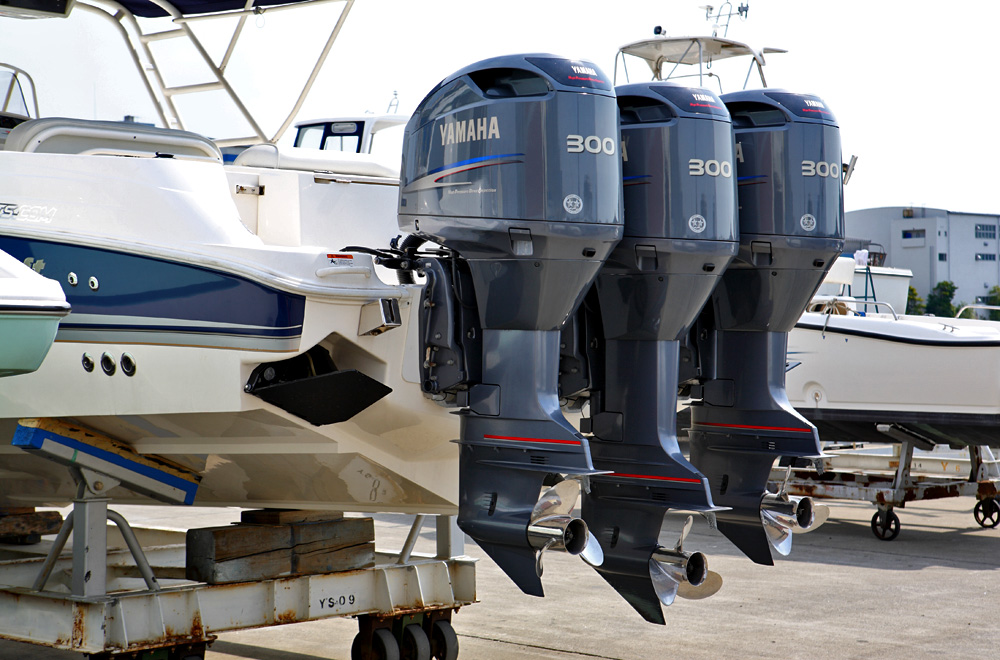
Yamaha outboard motors

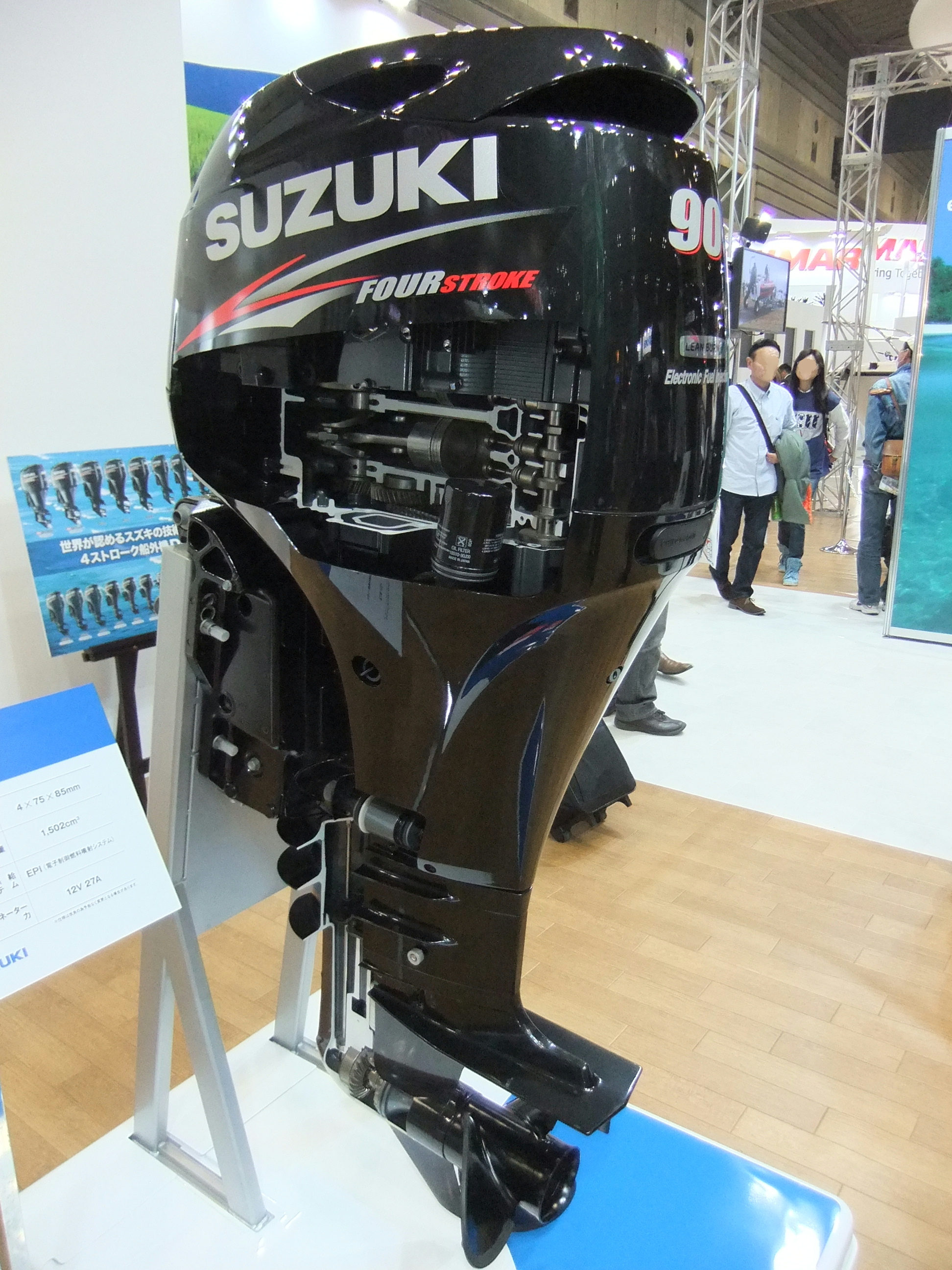
Suzuki outboard motors

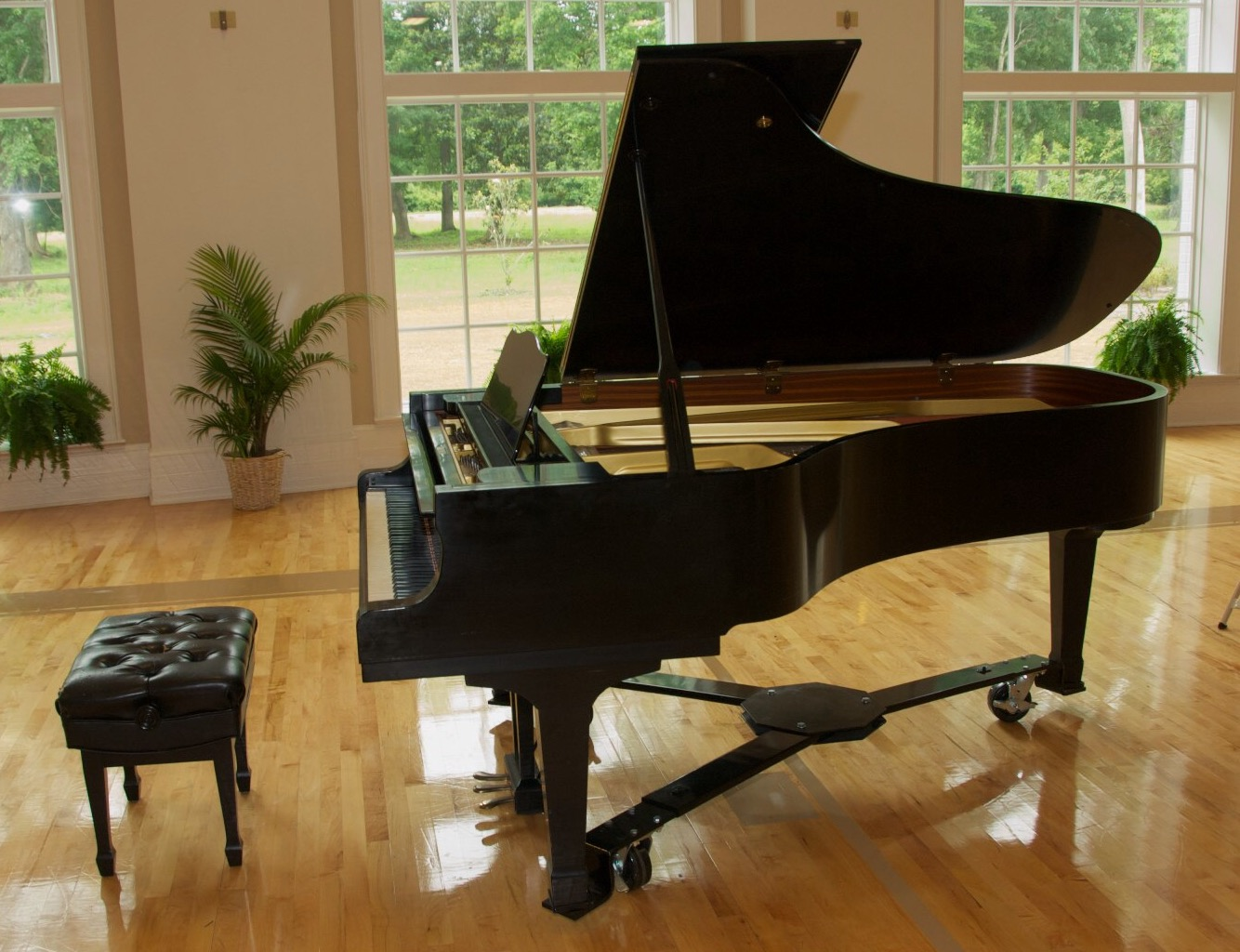
Yamaha grand piano

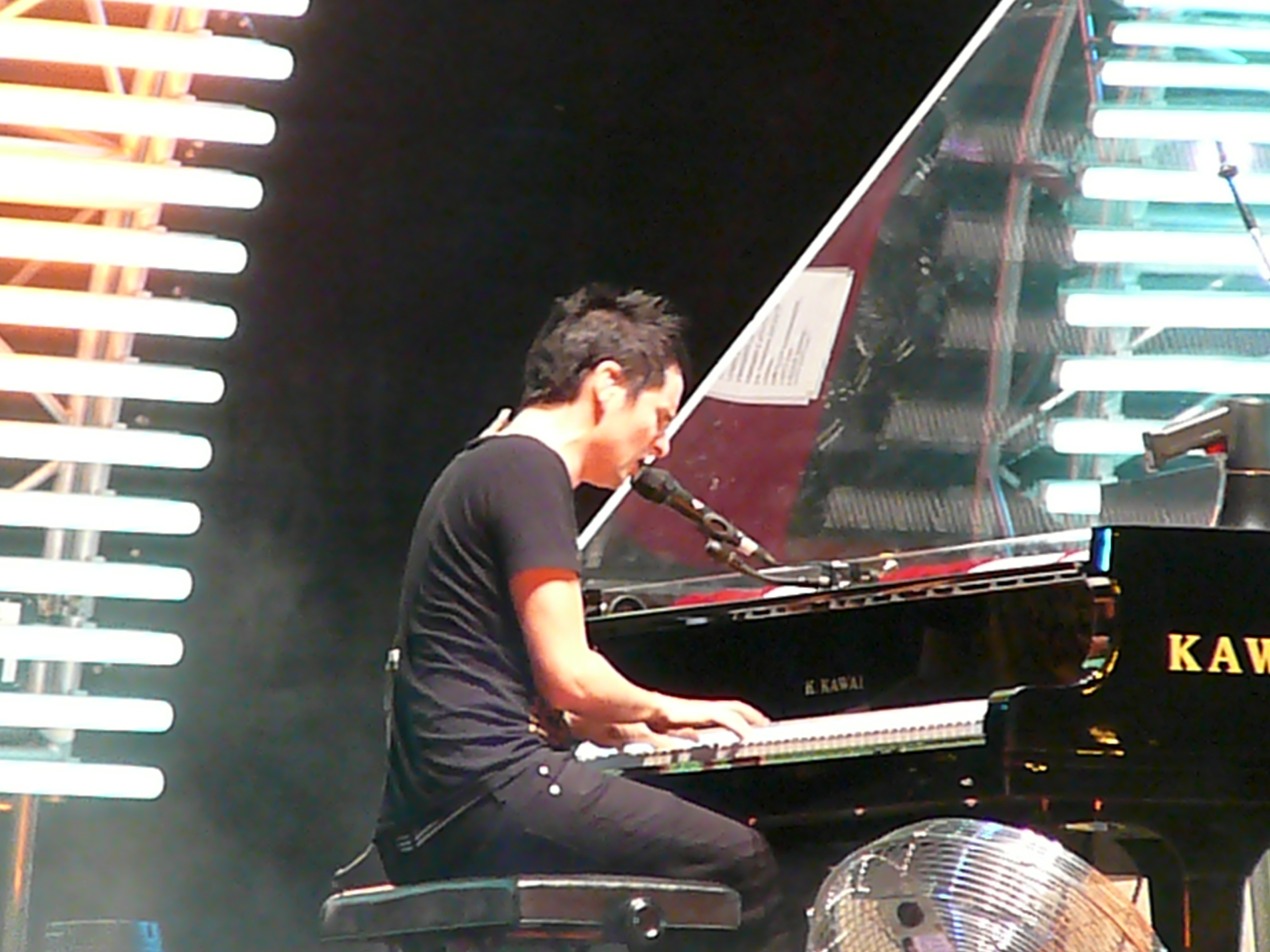
Kawai grand piano

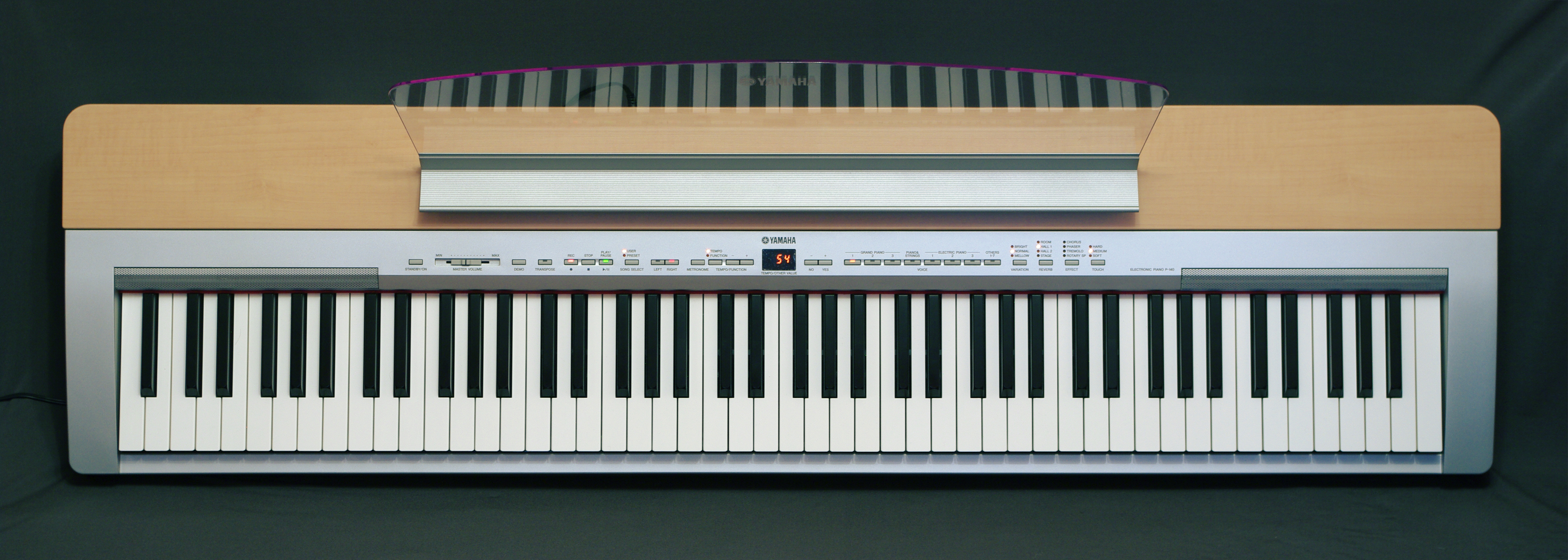
Yamaha electronic piano

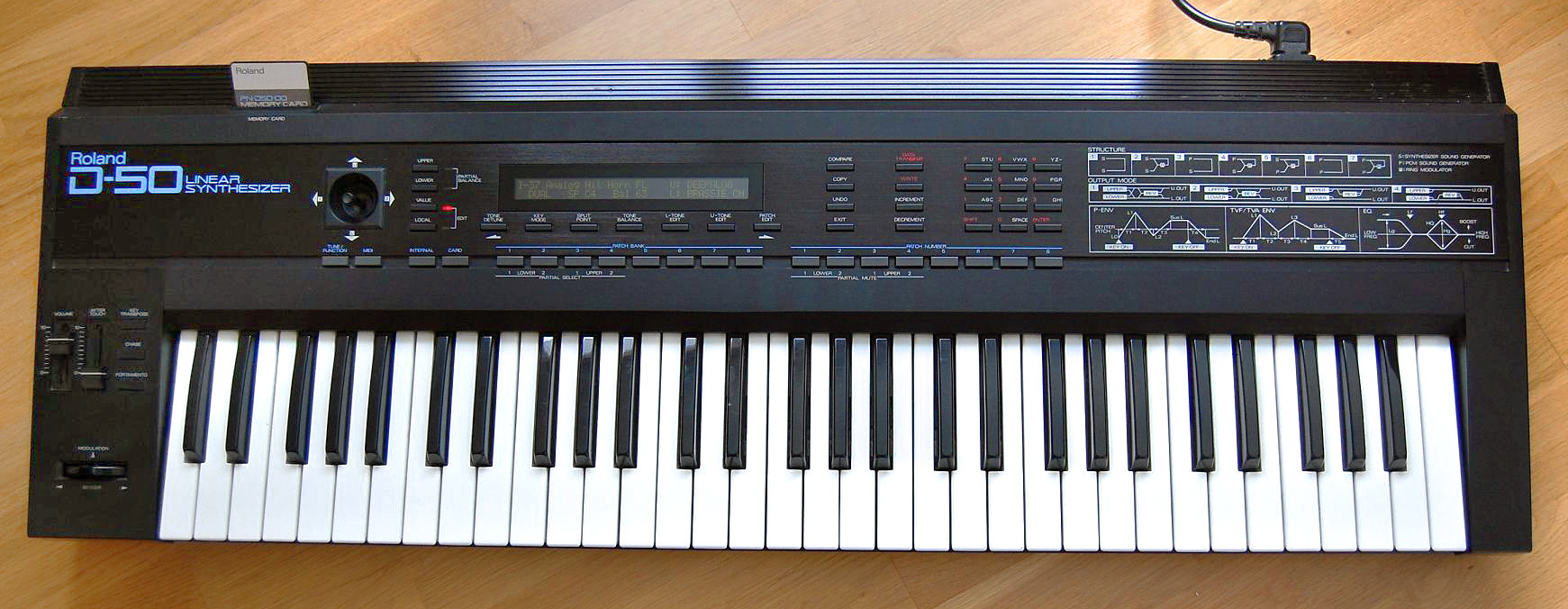
Roland D-50 synthesizer

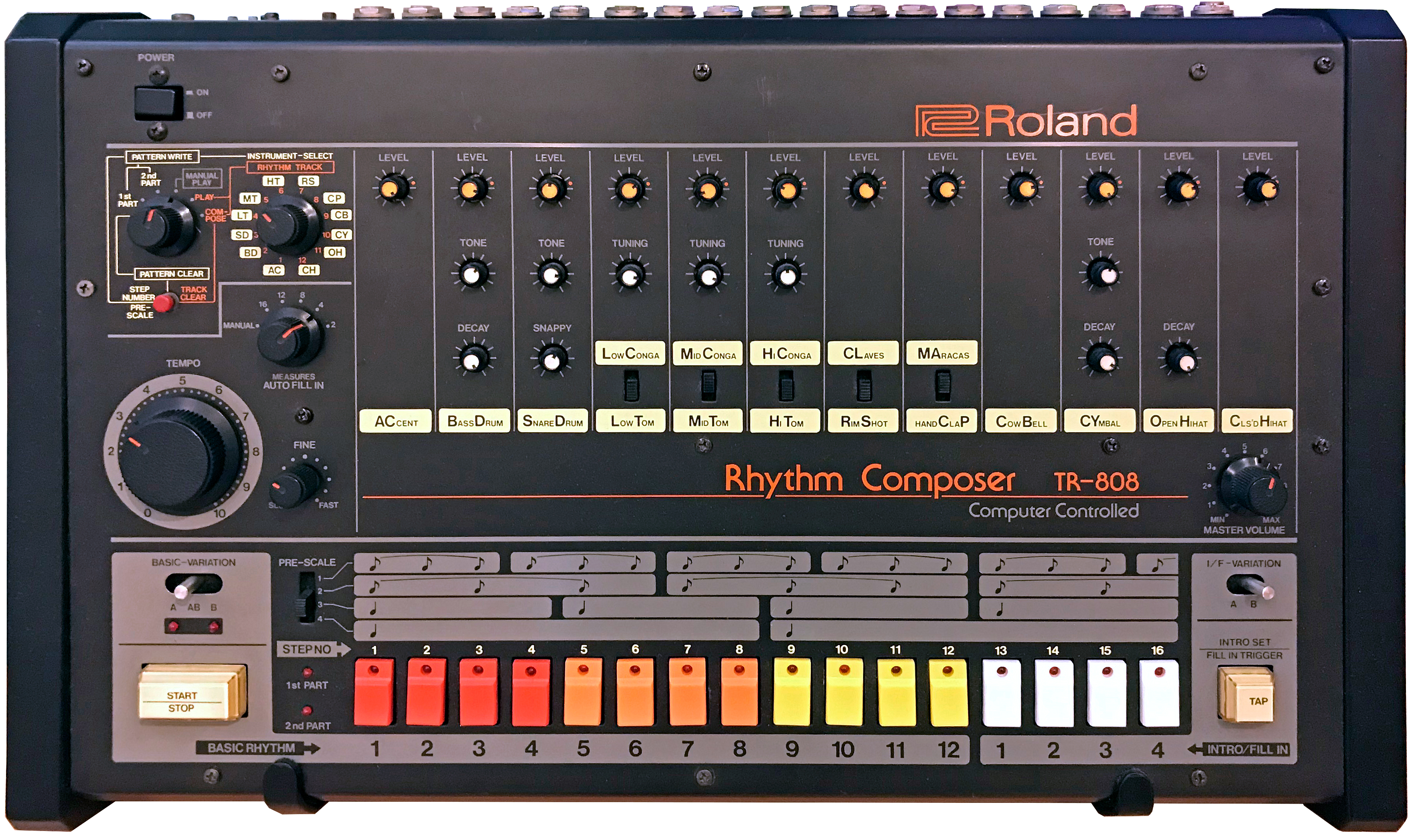
Roland TR-808. An iconic drum machine by Roland.

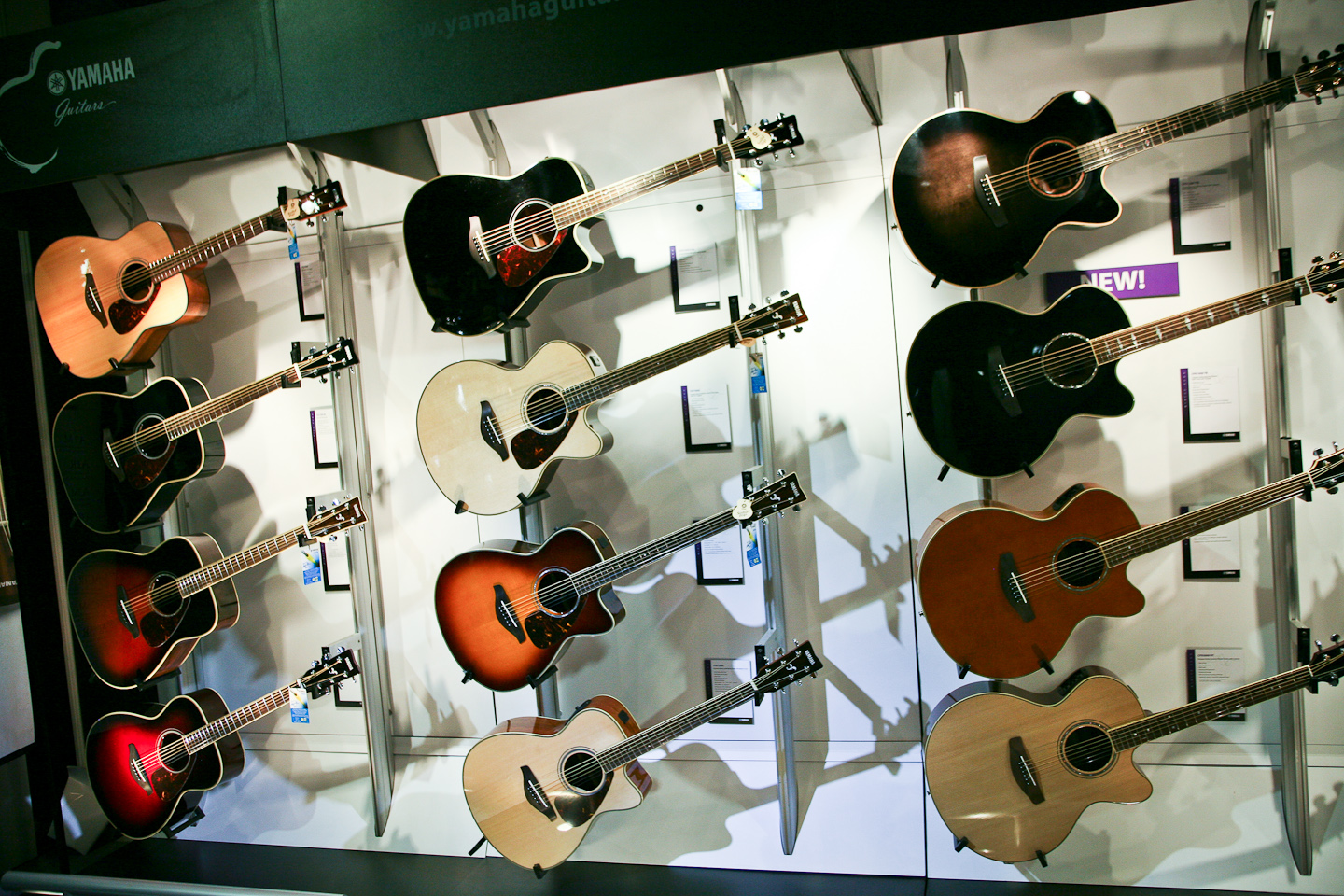
Yamaha acoustic guitars

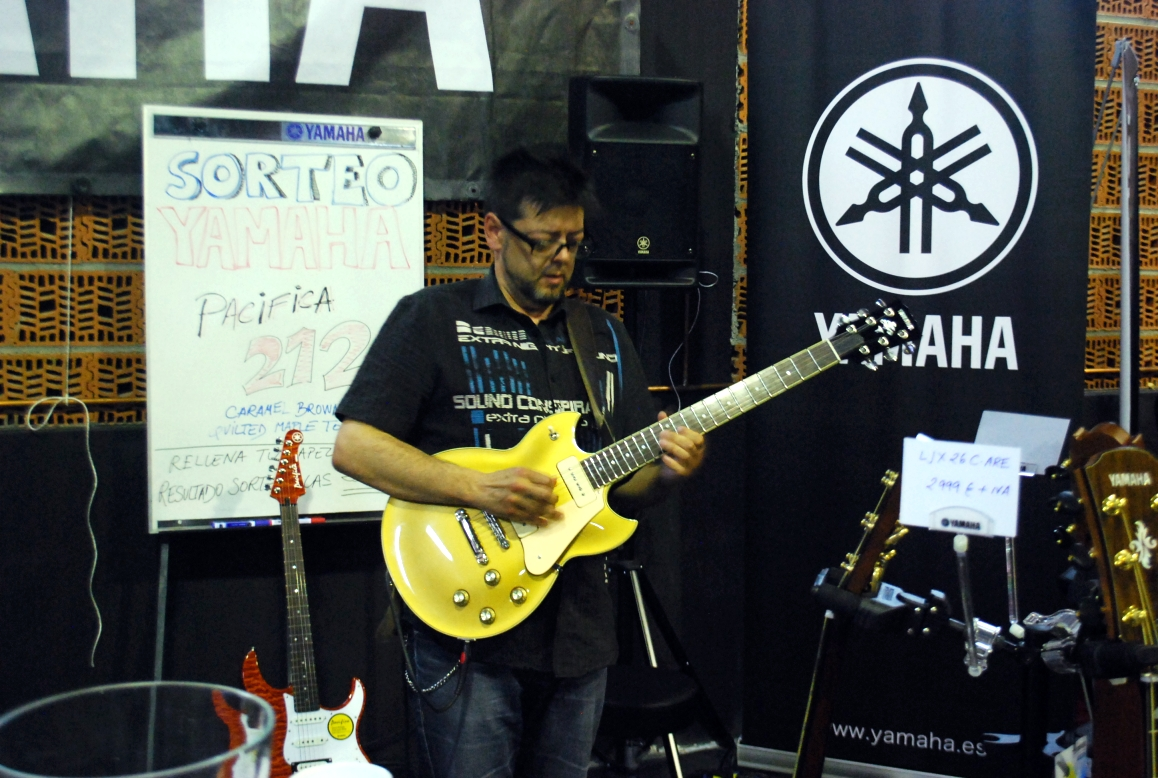
Yamaha electric guitars

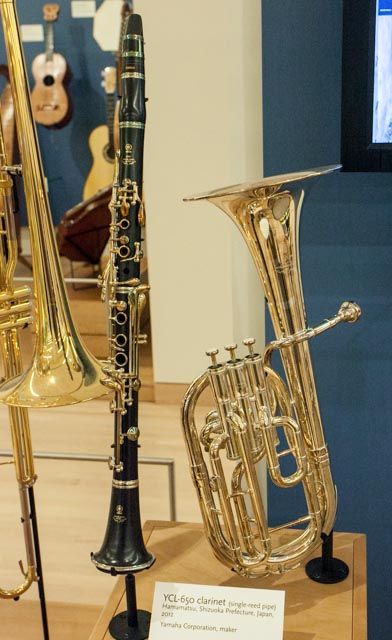
Yamaha wind instruments

== Transportation ==
=== Rail ===
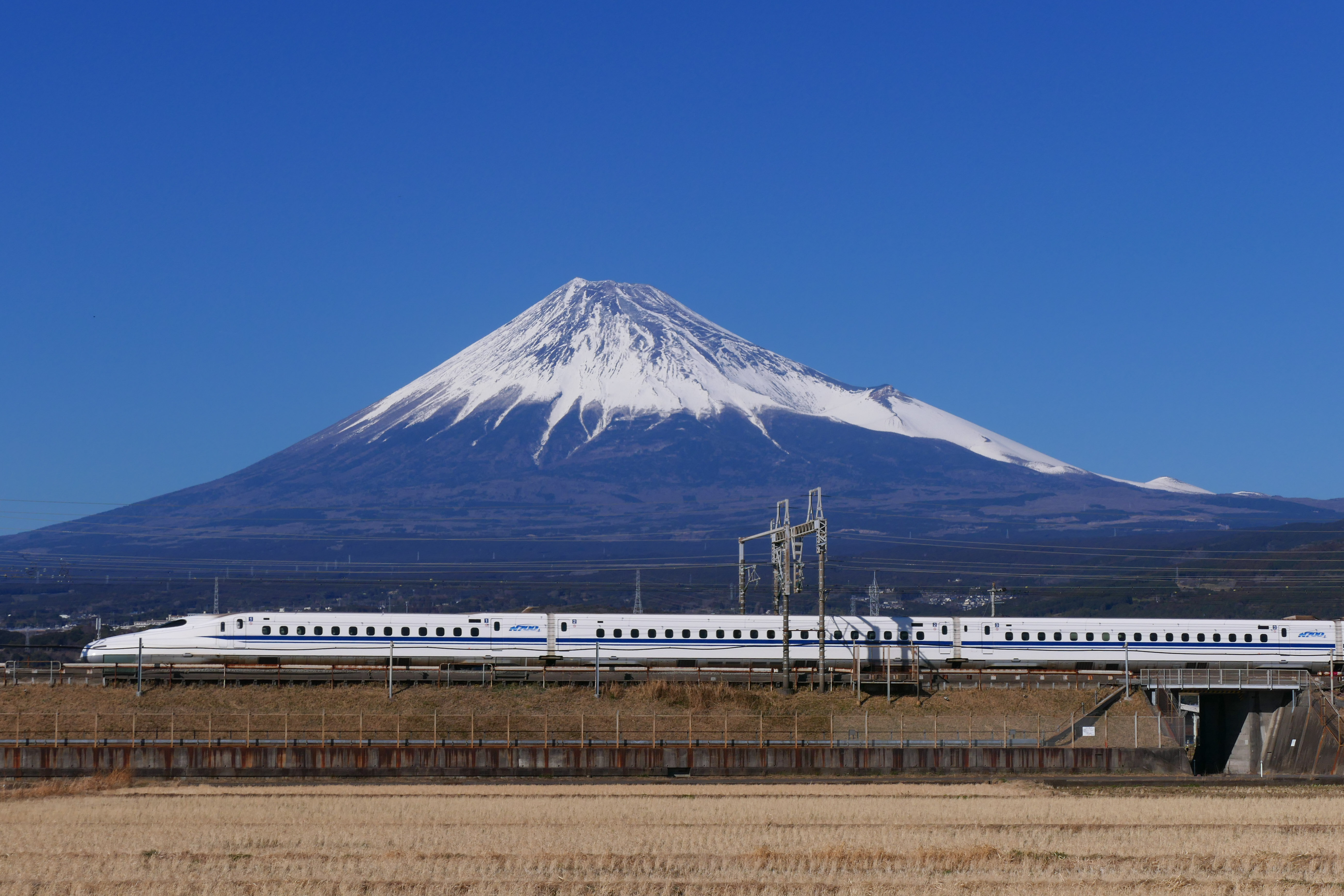
Tōkaidō Shinkansen

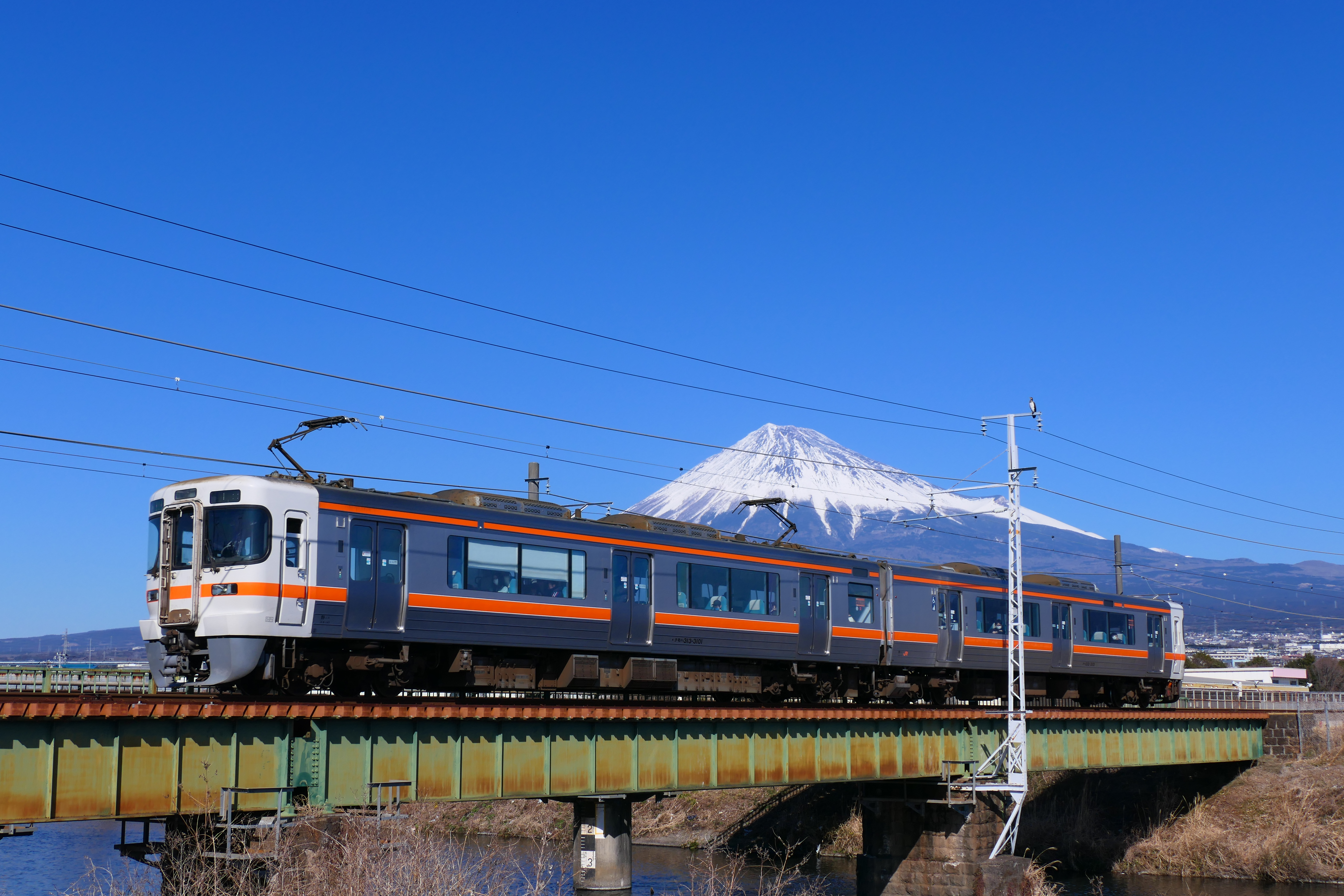
Minobu Line

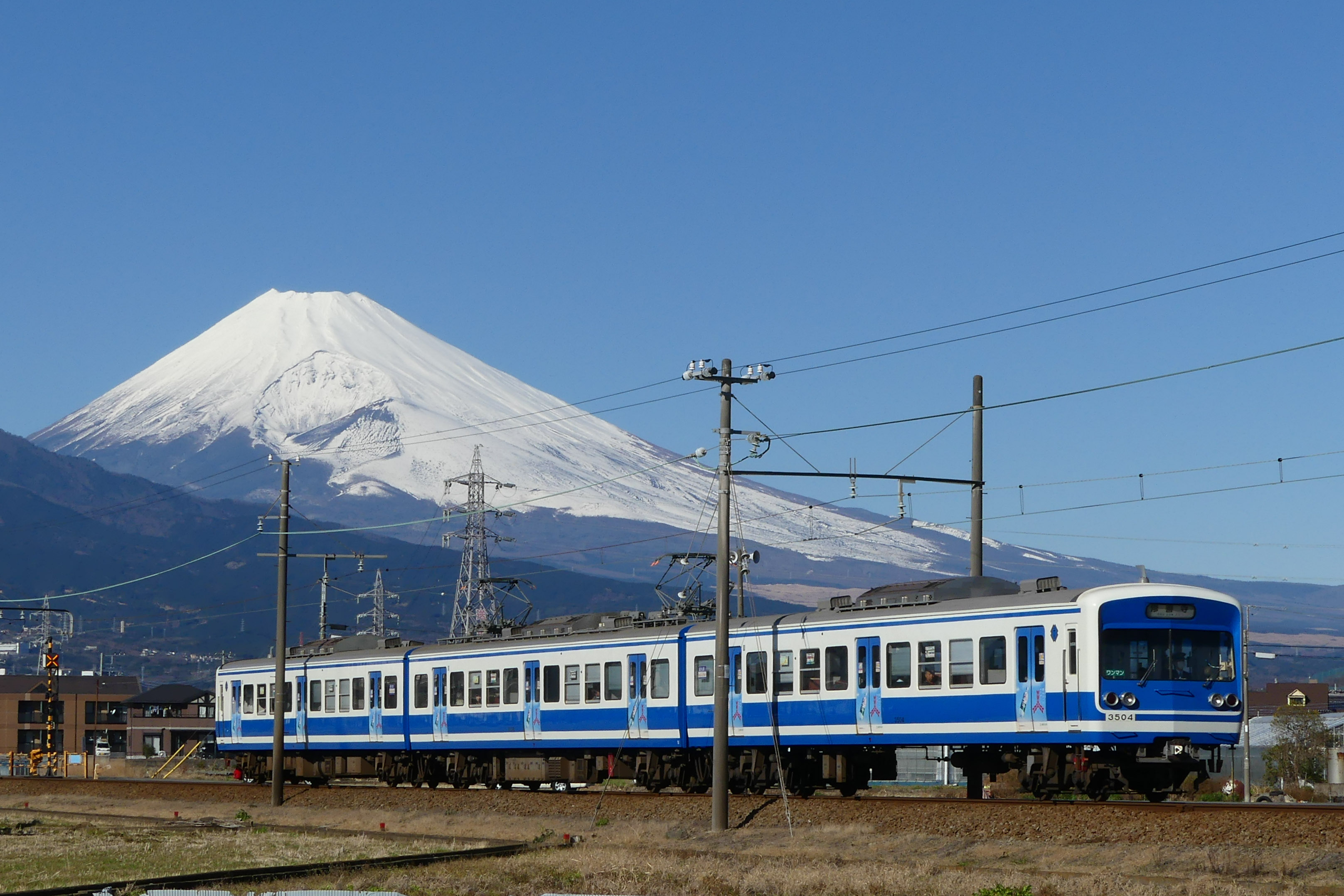
Izuhakone Railway

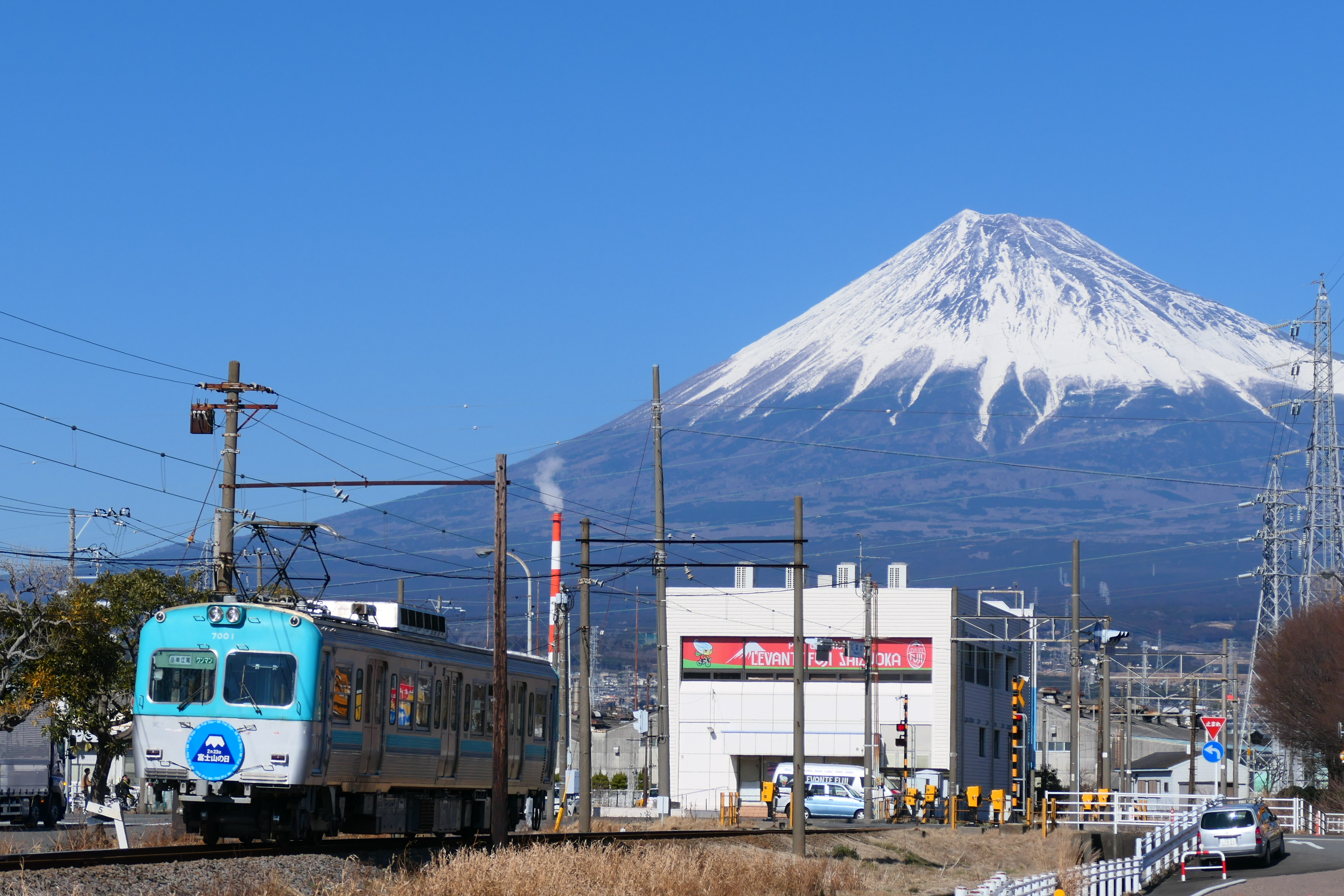
Gakunan Railway

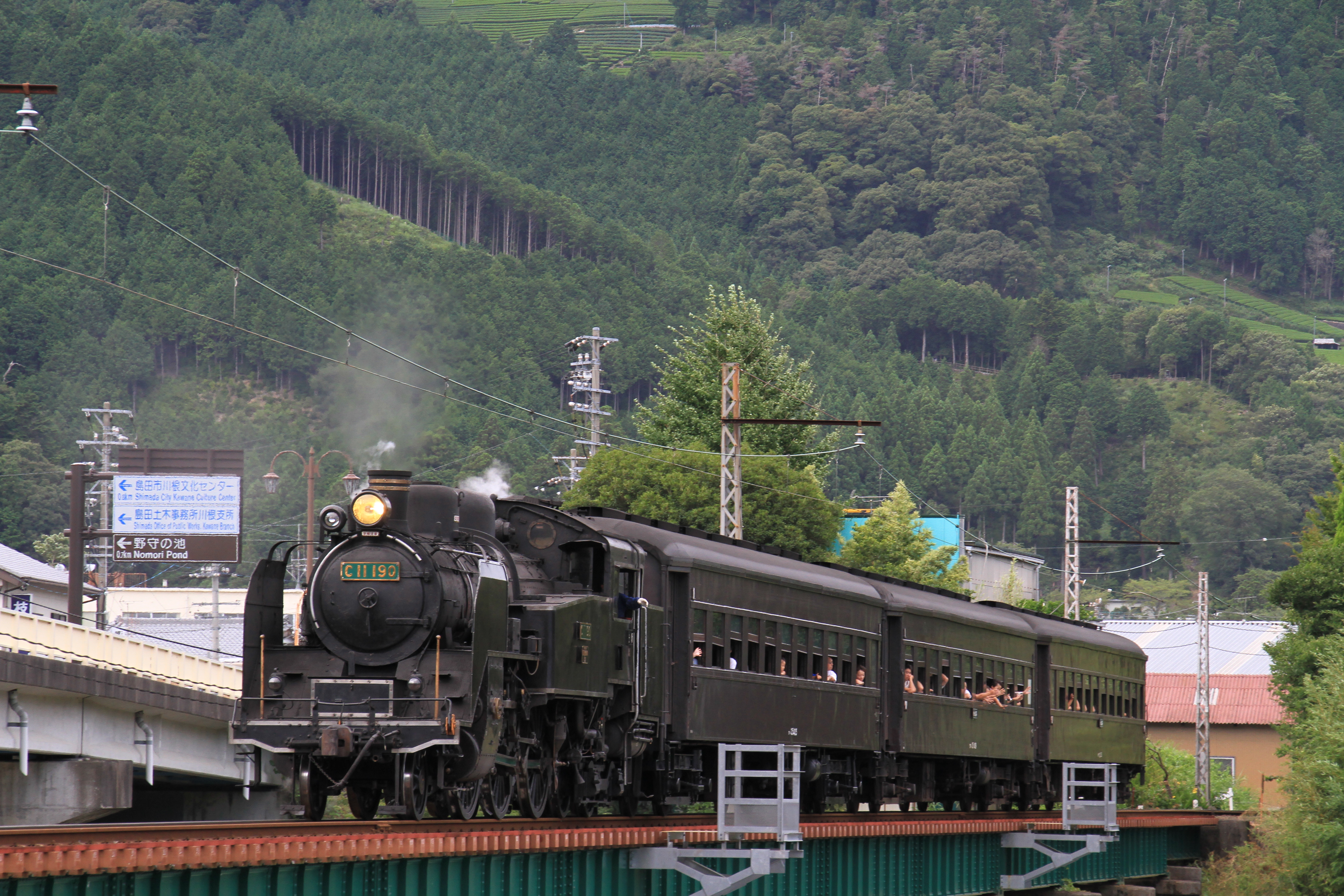
Ōigawa Railway

- Enshū Railway
- Gakunan Railway
- Izuhakone Railway
  - Daiyūzan Line
  - Sunzu Line
- Izukyū
- JR Central
  - Tōkaidō Shinkansen
  - Iida Line
  - Gotenba Line
  - Minobu Line
  - Tōkaidō Line (Atami–Toyohashi)
- JR East
  - Tōkaidō Line (Atami–Odawara)
  - Itō Line
- Ōigawa Railway
- Shizuoka Railway
- Tenryū Hamanako Railroad

=== Roads ===
==== Expressways ====
- Chūbu-Ōdan Expressway
- Izu-Jūkan Expressway
- San-en Nanshin Expressway
- Shin-Tōmei Expressway
- Tōmei Expressway

==== Toll roads ====
- Fujinomiya Road
- Nishi-Fuji Road
- Shizuoka East-West Road
- Shizuoka South-North Road
- West Fuji Road (not a toll road anymore as of 2012)

==== National highways ====
- National Route 1
- National Route 42
- National Route 52
- National Route 135
- National Route 136
- National Route 138
- National Route 139
- National Route 149
- National Route 150
- National Route 152
- National Route 246
- National Route 257
- National Route 301
- National Route 362
- National Route 414
- National Route 469
- National Route 473
- National Route 474

=== Airports ===
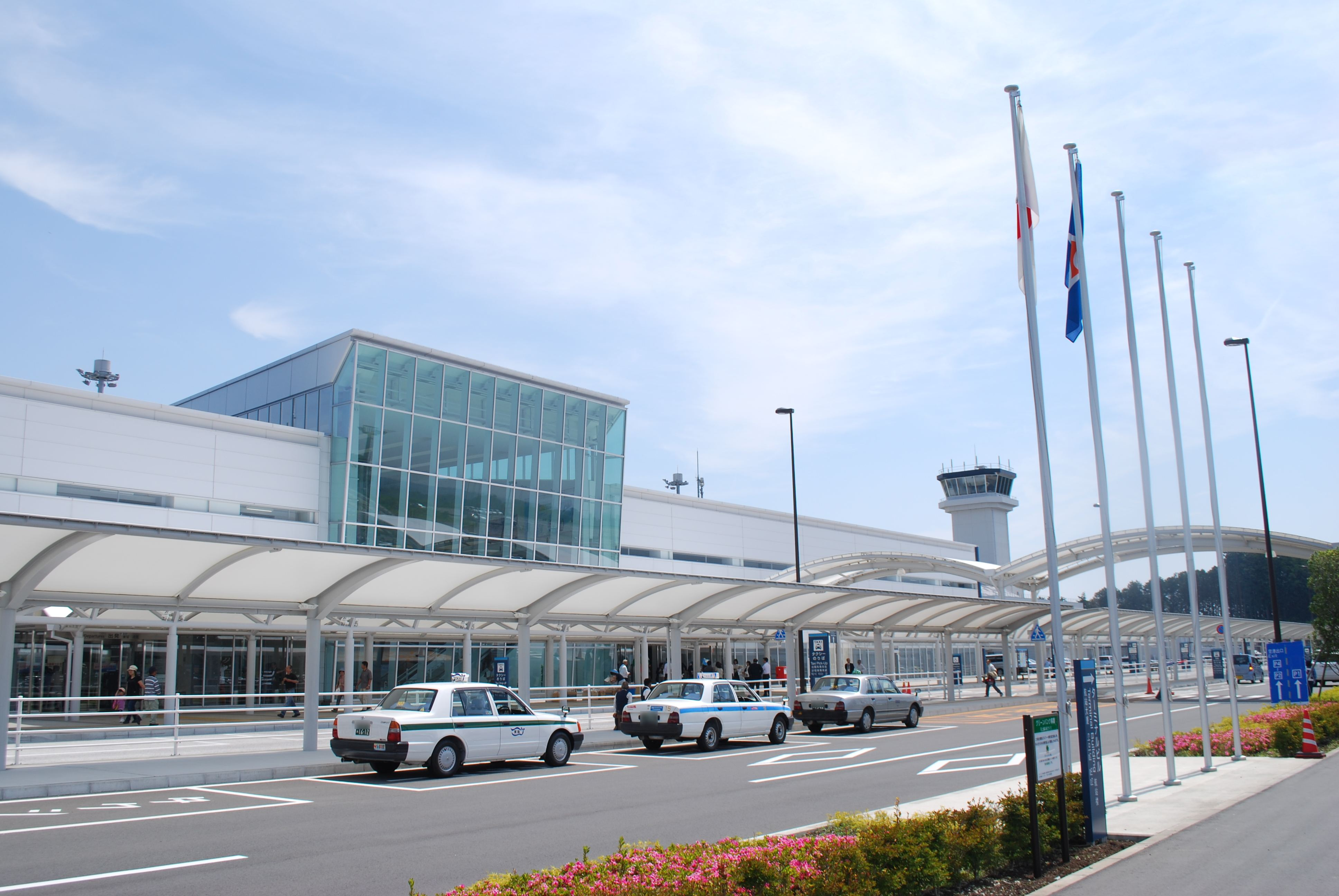
Shizuoka Airport

- Shizuoka Airport

=== Ports ===
- Shimizu Port
- Atami Port and Shimoda Port – Mainly ferry route to Izu Island
- Numazu Port

== Education ==
=== Universities ===
National universities

- Graduate University for Advanced Studies (Mishima Campus, National Institute of Genetics)
- Hamamatsu University School of Medicine
- Shizuoka University

Public universities

- Shizuoka University of Art and Culture
- University of Shizuoka

Private universities

- Fuji Tokoha University
- Hamamatsu University
- Hamamatsu Gakuin University
- Juntendo University (Mishima Campus)
- Nihon University (Mishima Campus)
- Seirei Christopher University
- Shizuoka Eiwa Gakuin University
- Shizuoka Institute of Science and Technology
- Shizuoka Sangyo University
- Shizuoka University of Welfare
- Tokai University (Shimizu and Numazu Campuses)
- Tokoha Gakuen University
- Tokyo Women's Medical University (Daito Campus)

=== Senior high schools ===
- Hamana High School
- Hiryū High School
- Numazu Commercial High School
- Shizuoka Gakuen Junior and Senior High School
- Shizuoka Prefectural High School
- Shizuoka Prefectural Susono High School

== Sports ==
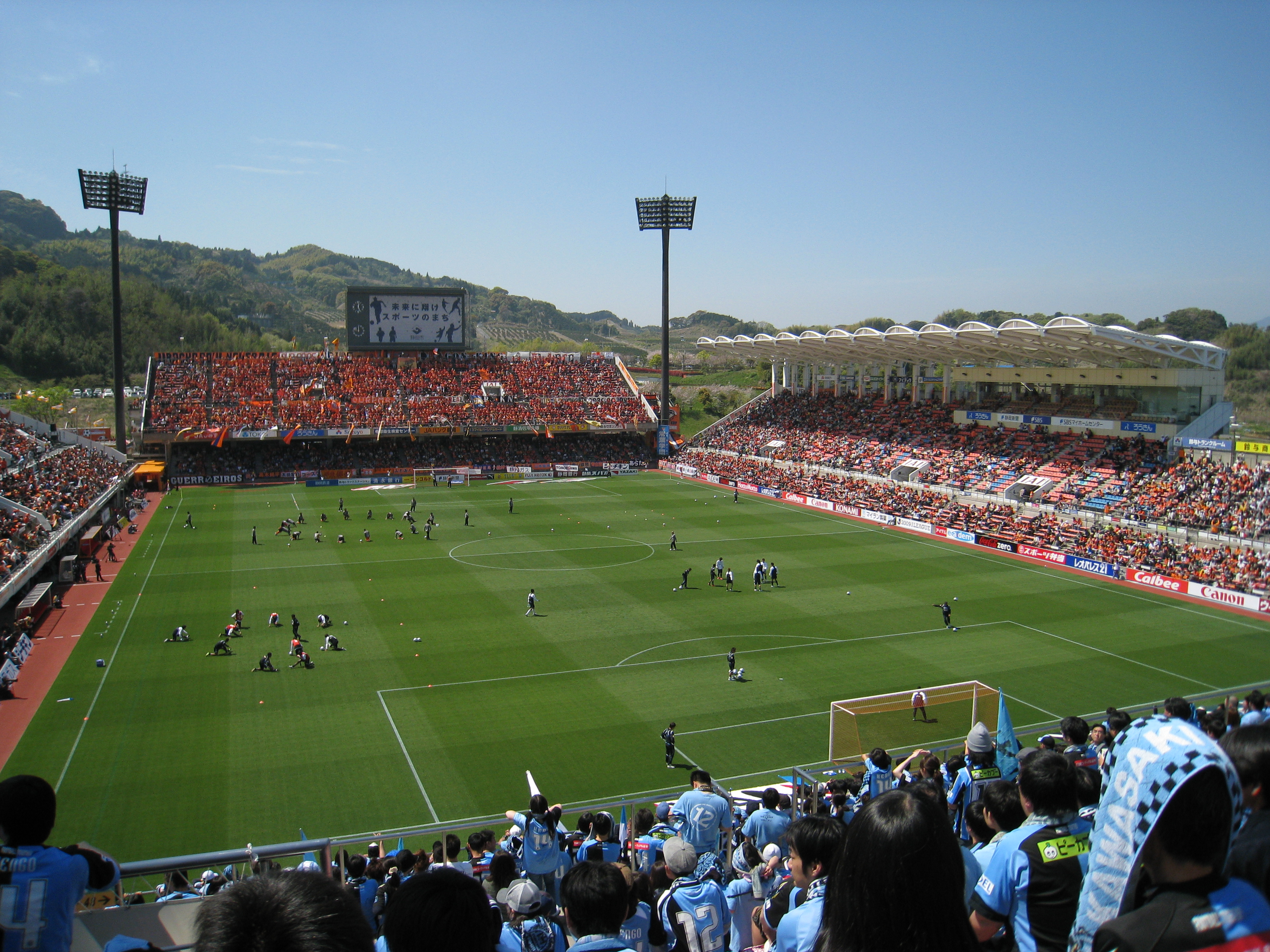
Shimizu S-Pulse playing at the IAI Stadium Nihondaira in Shimizu-ku

The sports teams listed below are based in Shizuoka.

=== Basketball ===
- San-en NeoPhoenix

=== Motorsport ===
- Fuji International Speedway

=== Rugby ===
- Yamaha Júbilo (Iwata)

=== Football ===
- Shimizu S-Pulse (Shimizu, Shizuoka)
- Júbilo Iwata (Iwata)
  - Matches between the above two teams, both currently in the top flight of the J. League, are known as the Shizuoka derby.
- Honda F.C. (Hamamatsu)
- Azul Claro Numazu (Numazu)
- Fujieda MYFC (Fujieda)

=== Volleyball ===
- Toray Arrows (men's volleyball team) (Mishima city)

== Tourism ==
=== Museums ===
- Museum of Natural and Environmental History, Shizuoka
- Shizuoka Prefectural Museum of Art

=== Theme parks ===
- Air Park Japan Air Self-Defense Force Hamamatsu Public Information Building)
- Shimizu Sushi Museum

=== Festivals and events ===
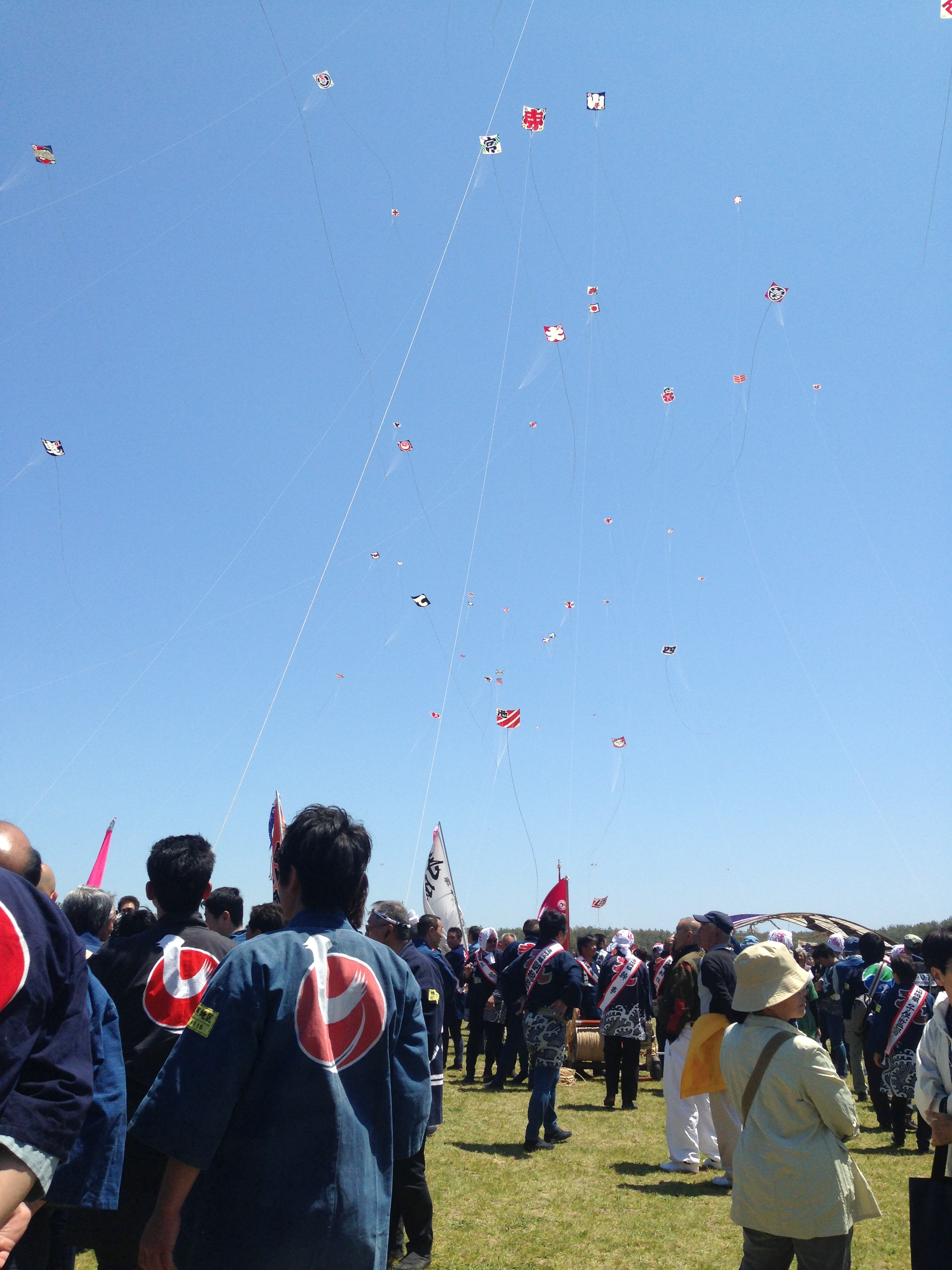
A kite festival in Hamamatsu, May 2013

- Daidogei World Cup in central Shizuoka City, held in November
- Enshu Daimyo Festival in Iwata, held in April
- Mishima Festival, held in August
- Numazu Festival, held in July
- Shimizu Port Festival, held on 5 to 7 August
- Shimoda Black Ship Festival, held in May
- Shizuoka Festival, held in April
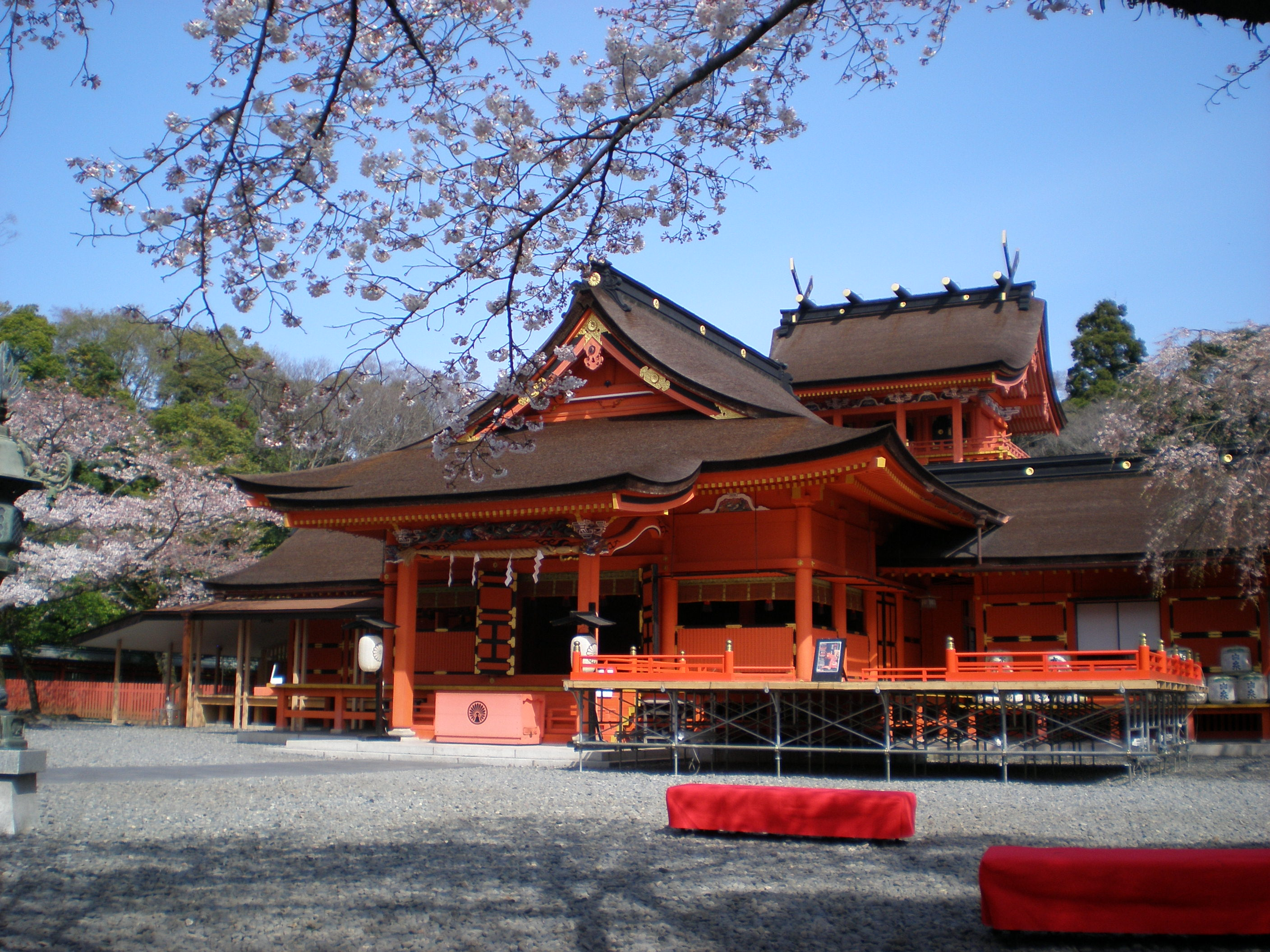
Fujisan Hongū Sengen Taisha Fujinomiya

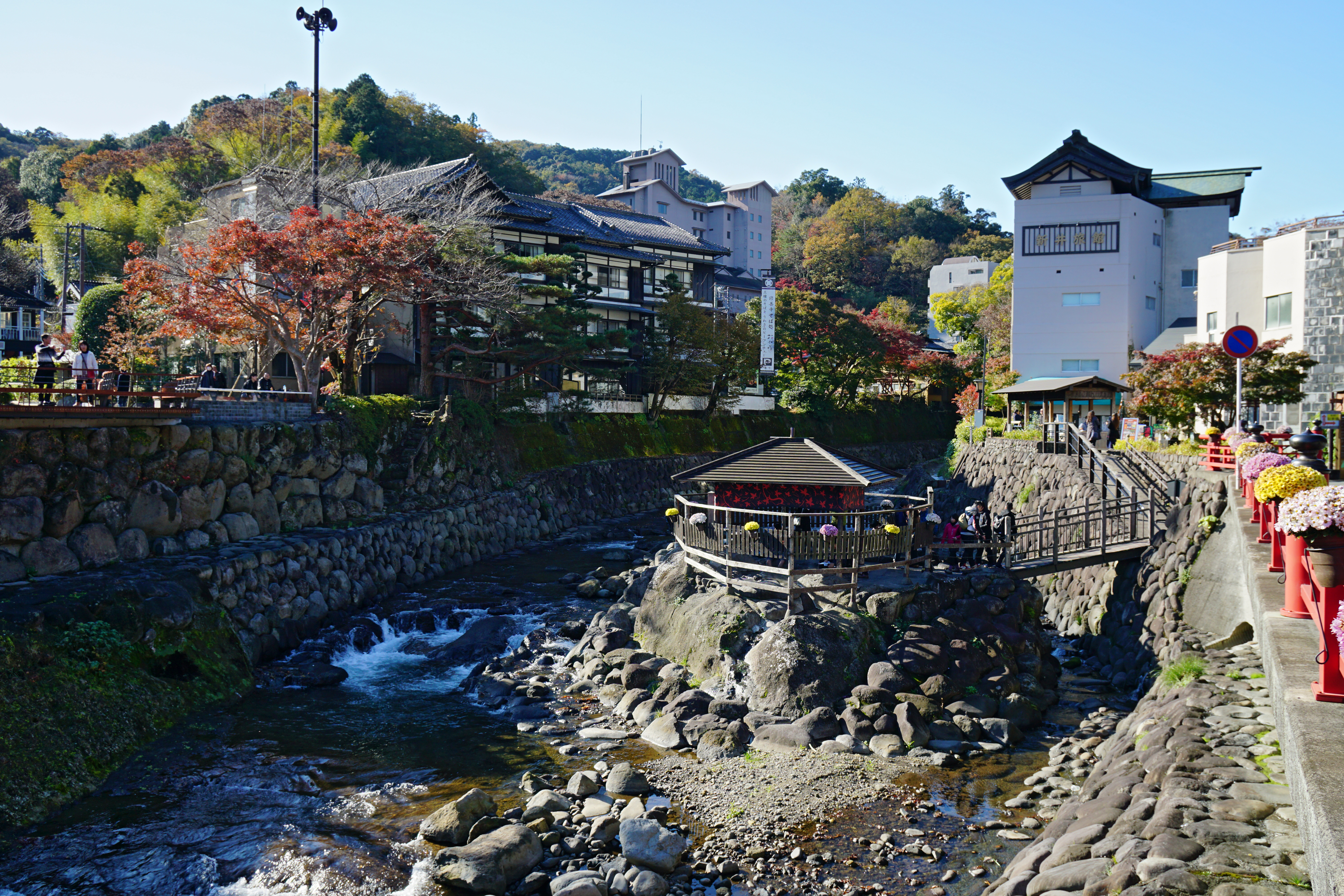
Shuzenji Onsen Izu

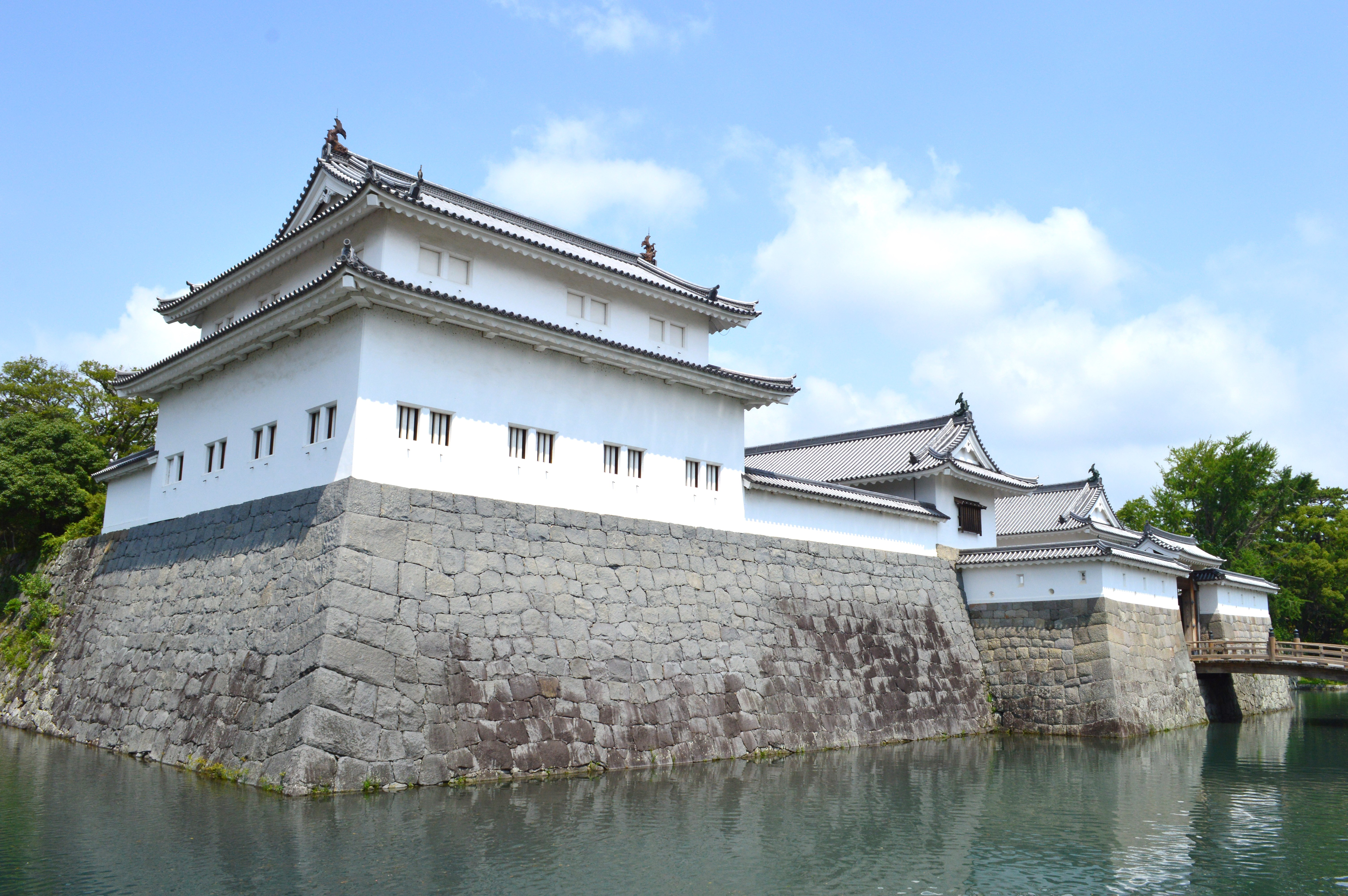
Sunpu Castle Shizuoka Aoi-ku

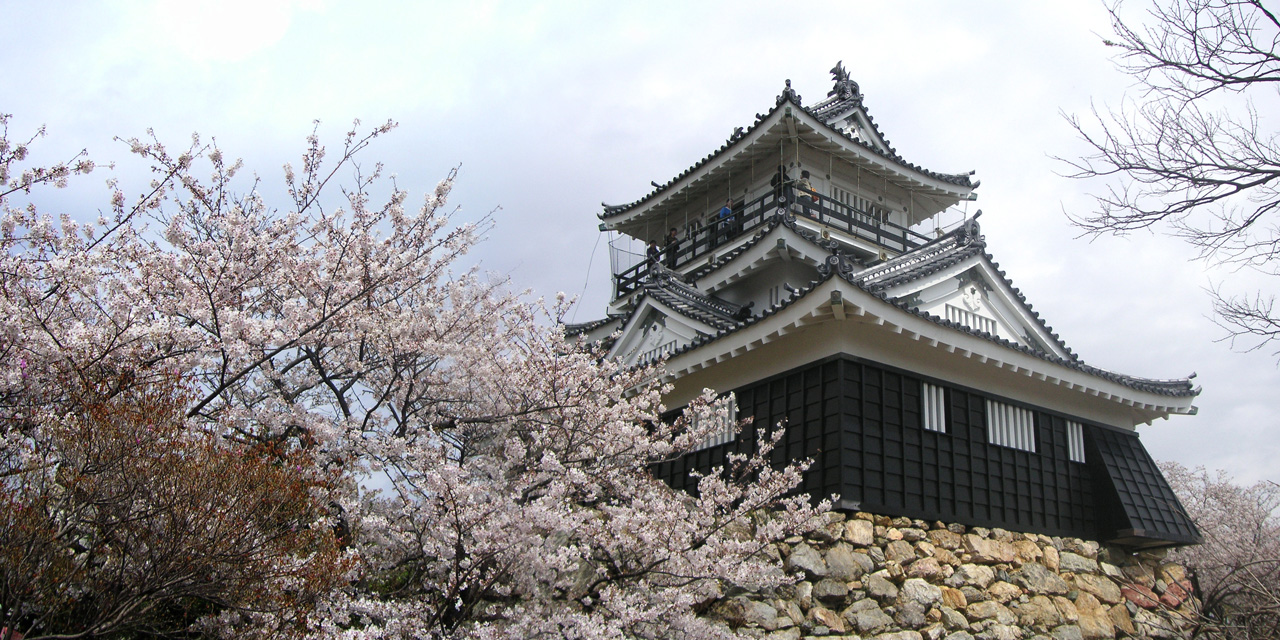
Hamamatsu Castle Hamamatsu Chūō-ku

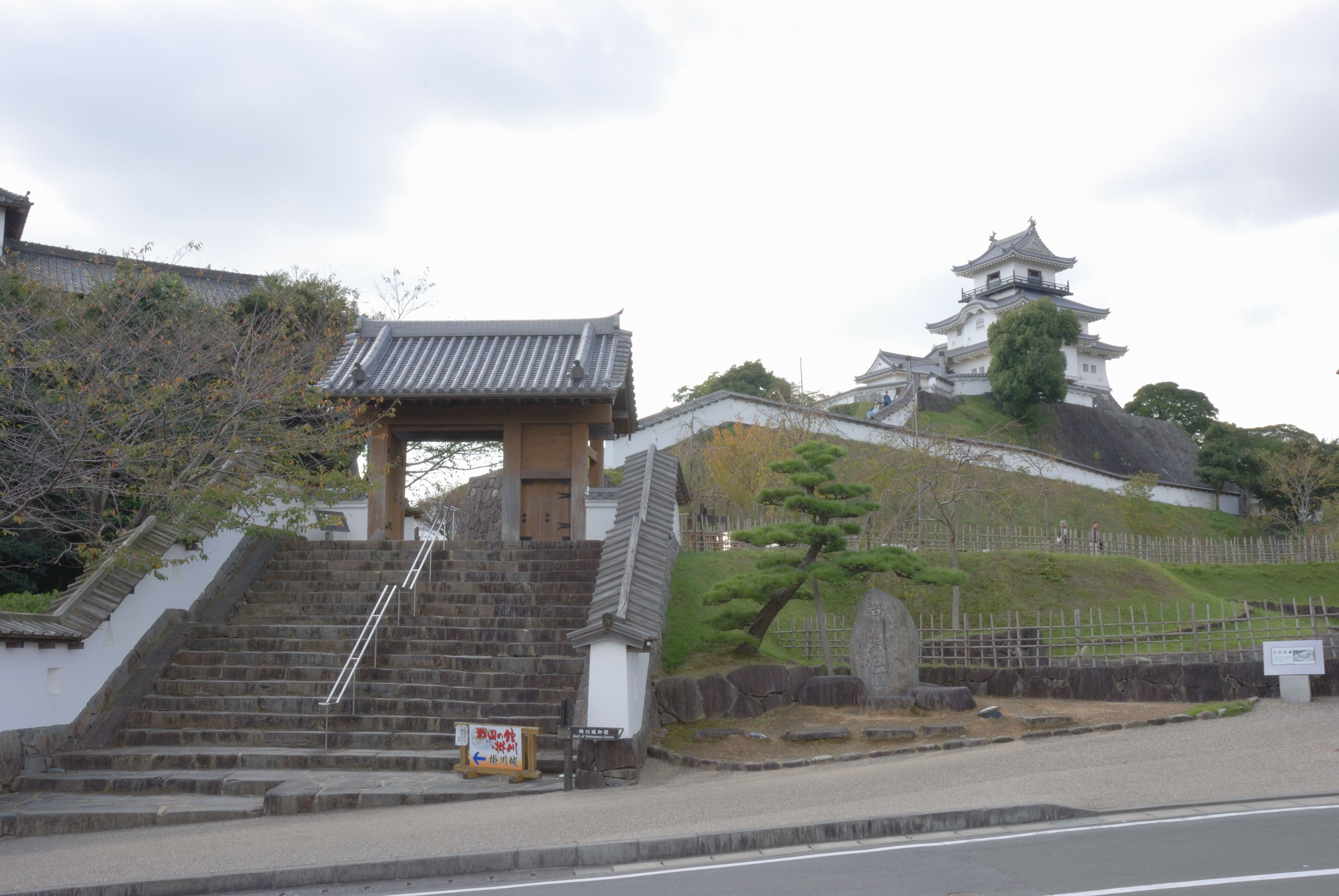
Kakegawa Castle Kakegawa

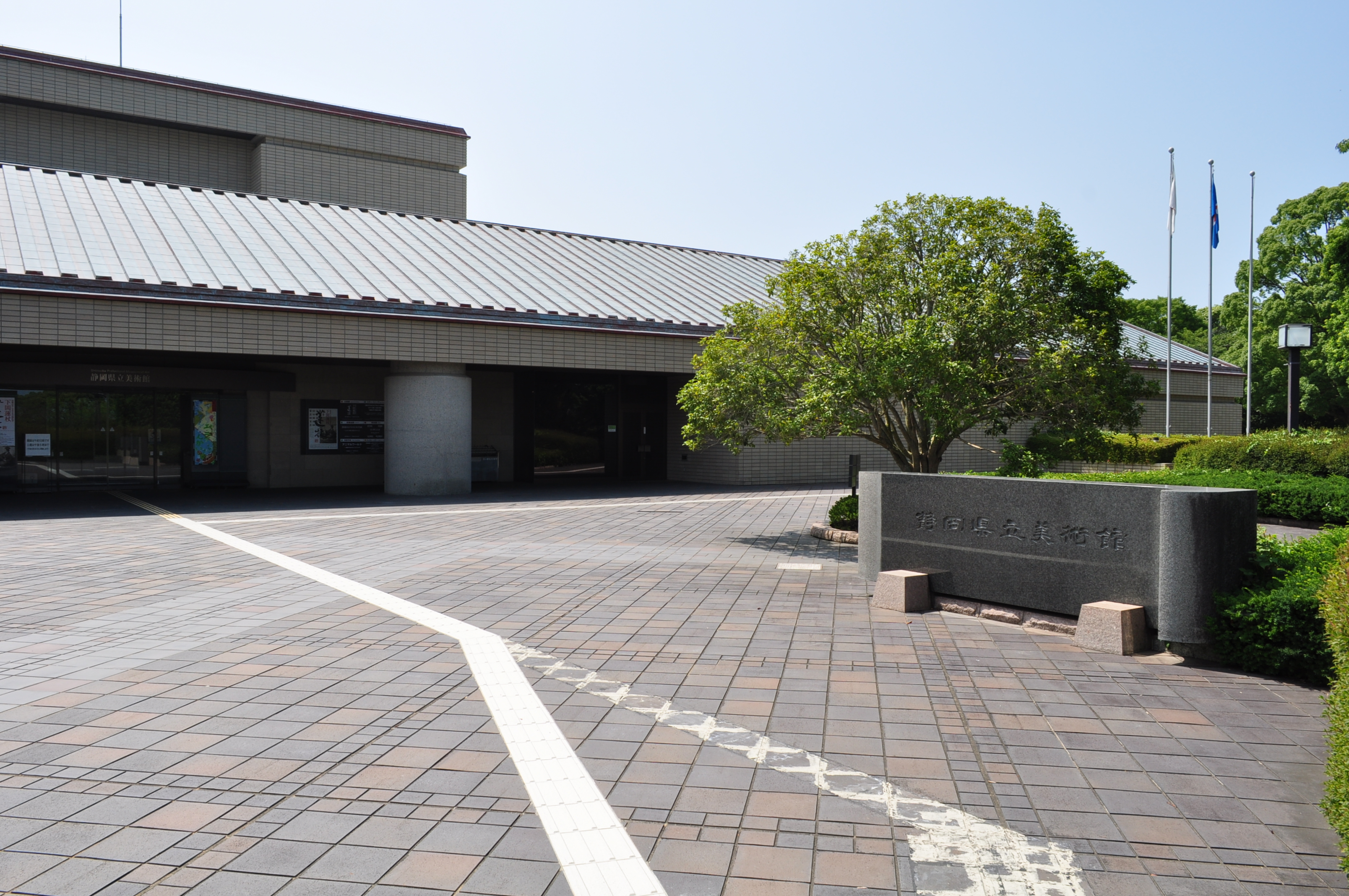
Shizuoka Prefectural Museum of Art Shizuoka Suruga-ku

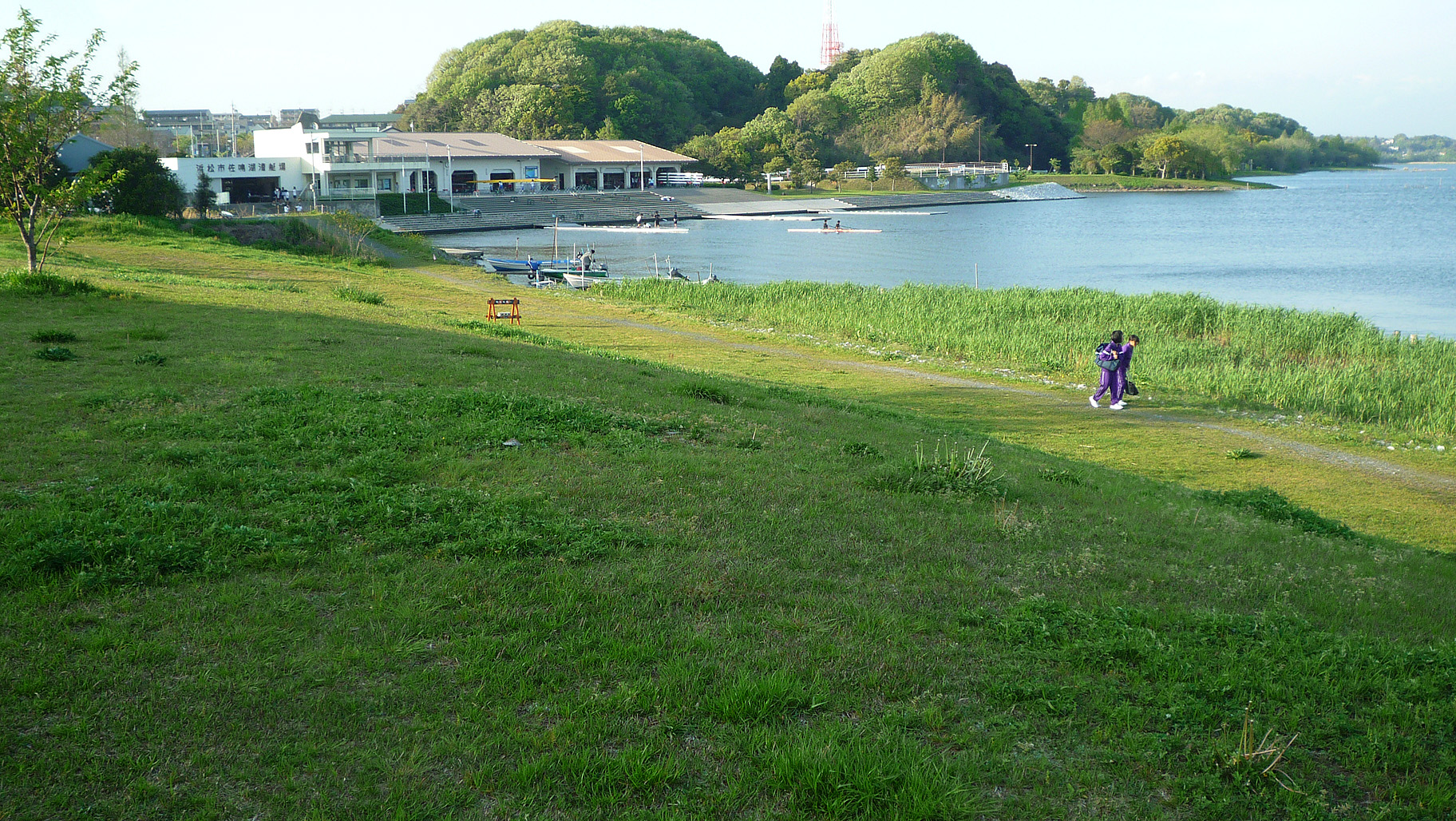
Lake Sanaru Hamamatsu Nishi-ku

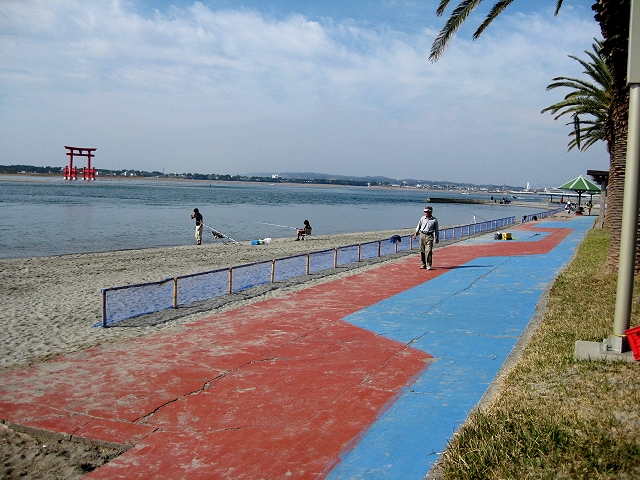
Lake Hamana Hamamatsu Nishi-ku

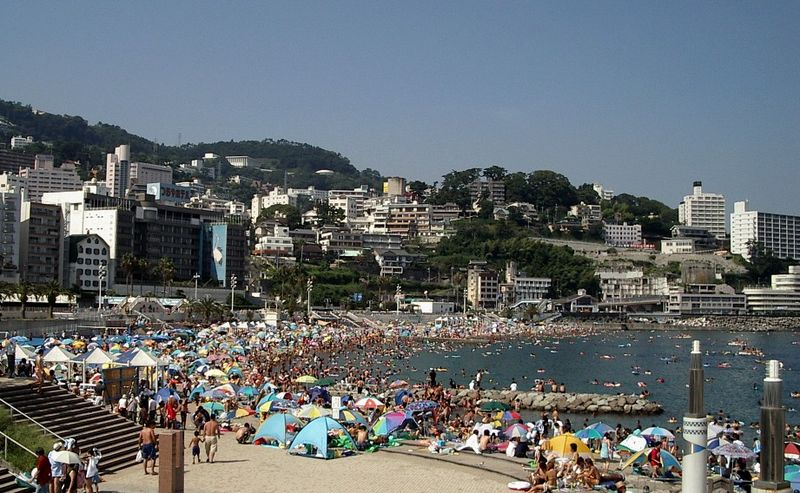
Atami Sun Beach Atami

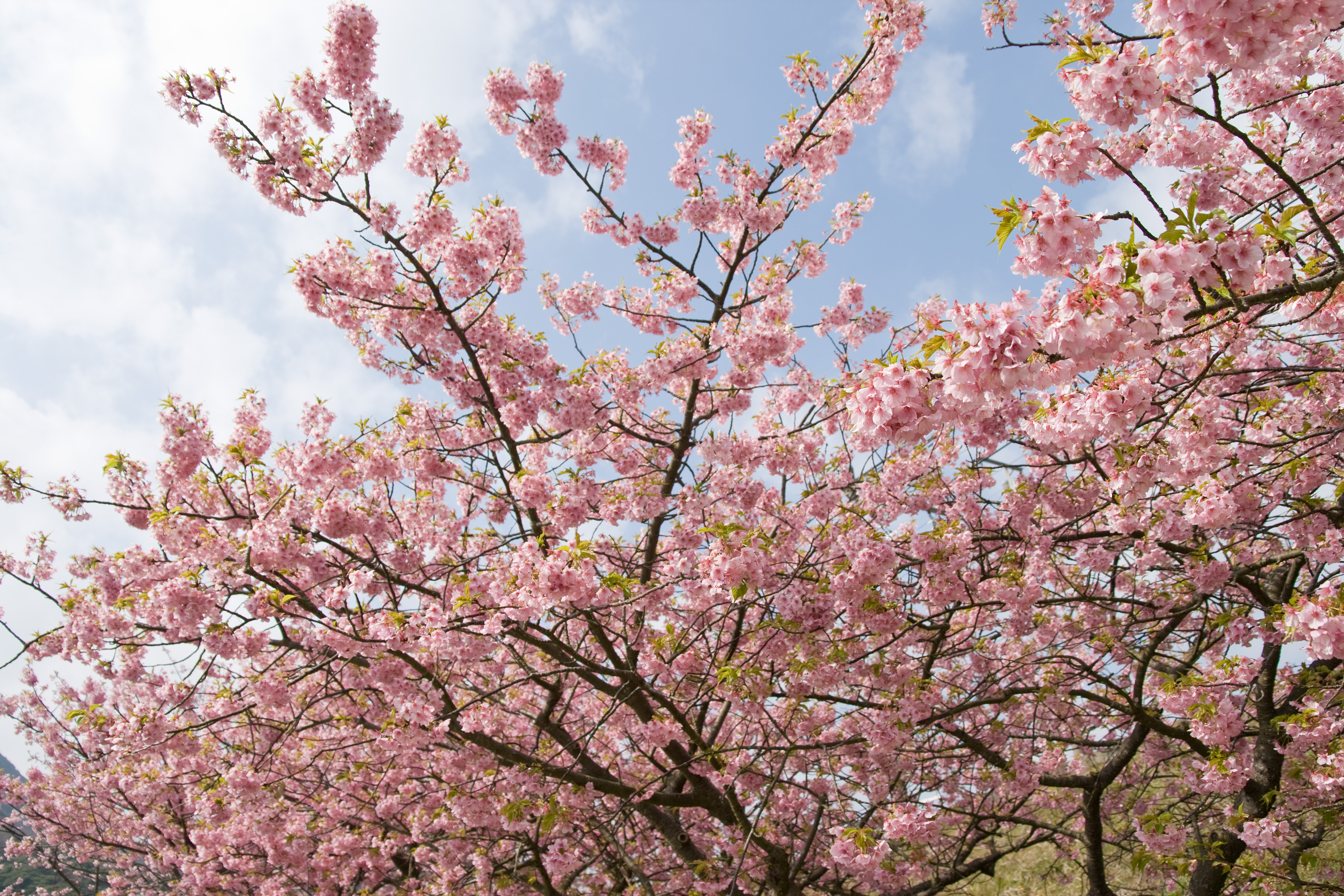
Kawazu Cherry blossom Kamo District Kawazu

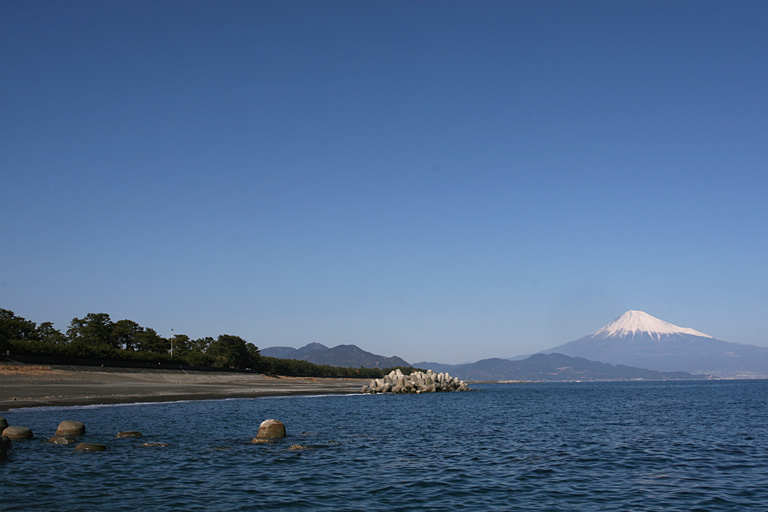
Miho no Matsubara Shizuoka Shimizu-ku

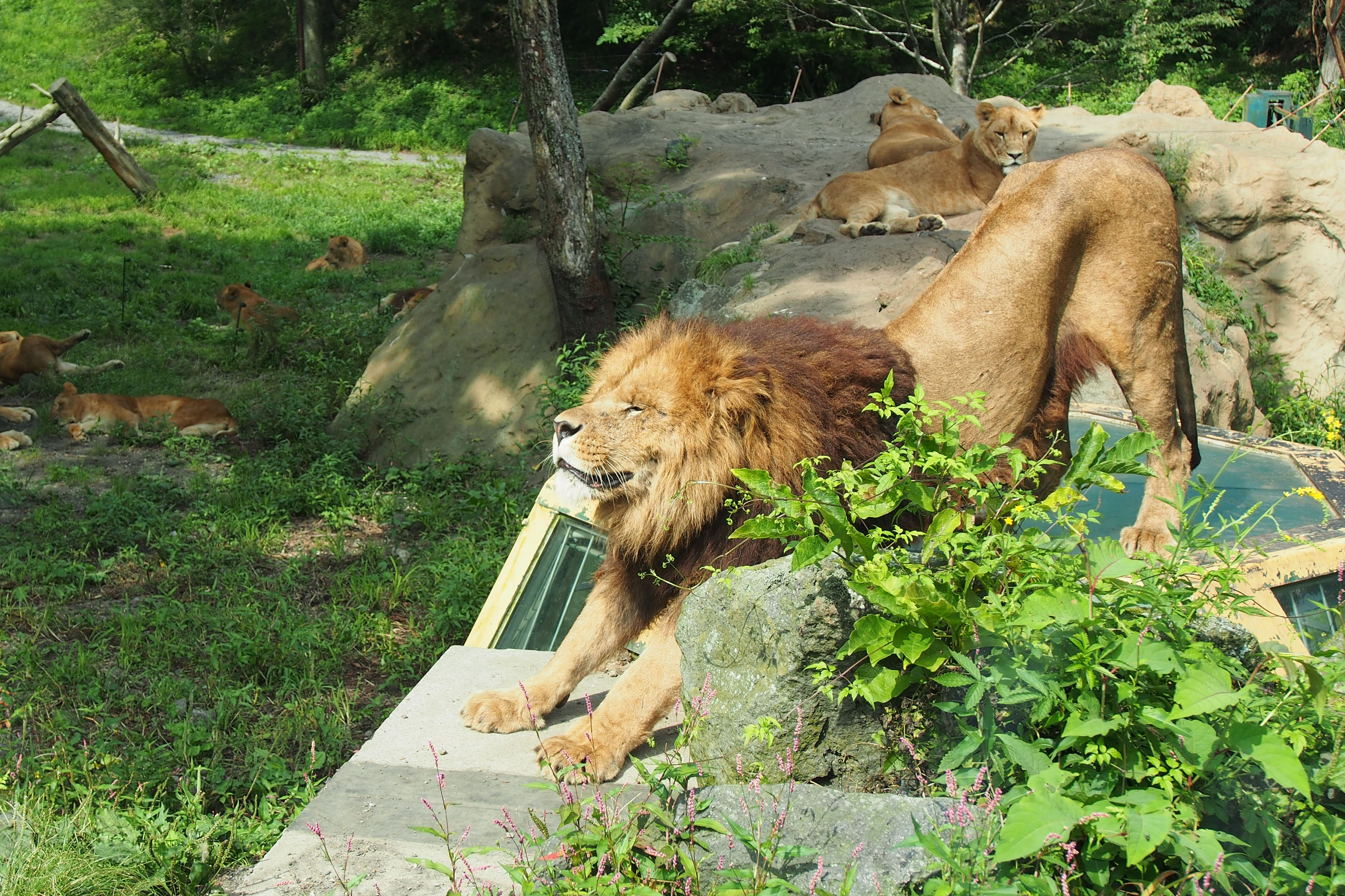
Fuji Safari Park Susono

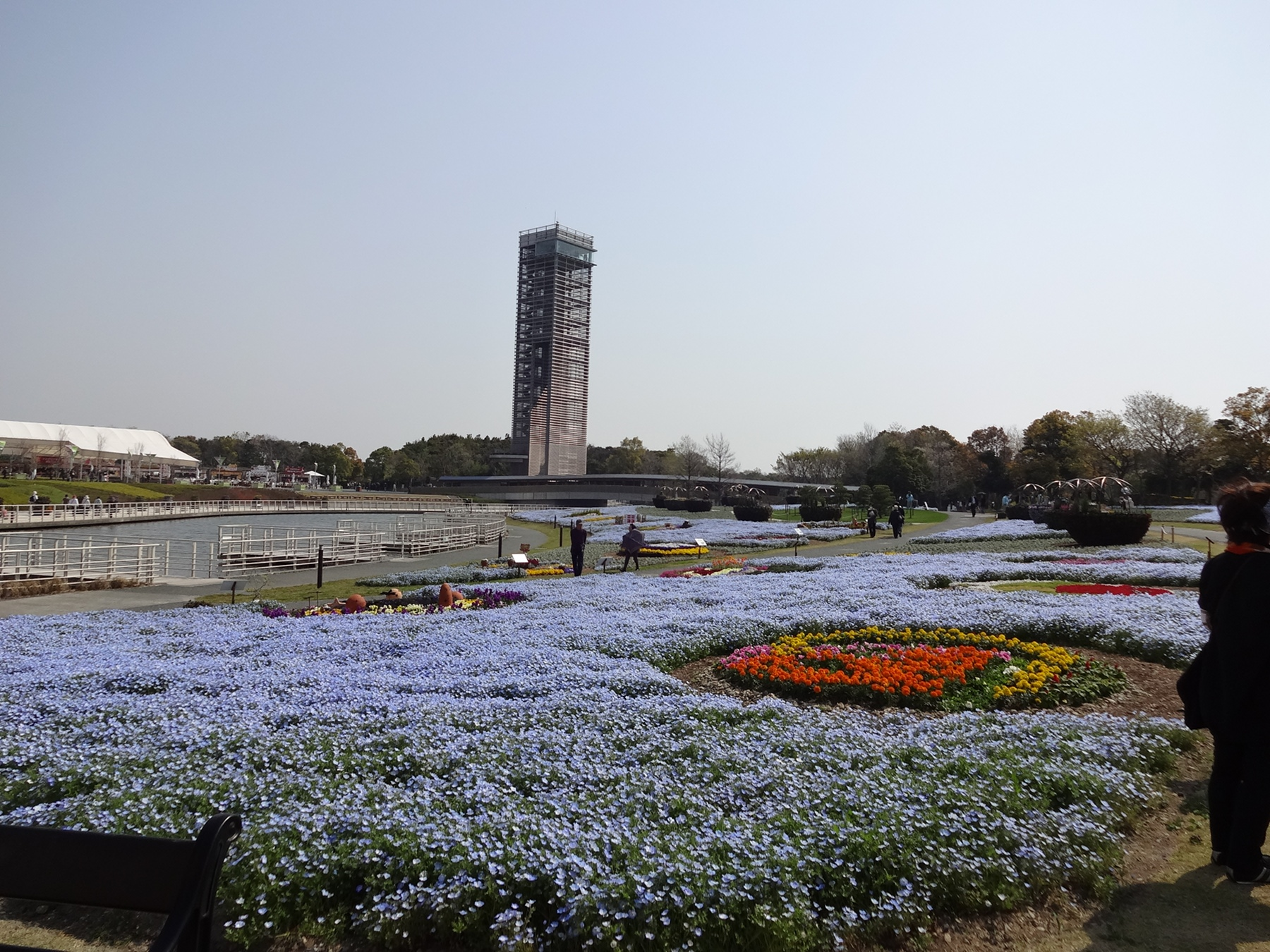
Hamanako Garden Park Hamamatsu Nishi-ku

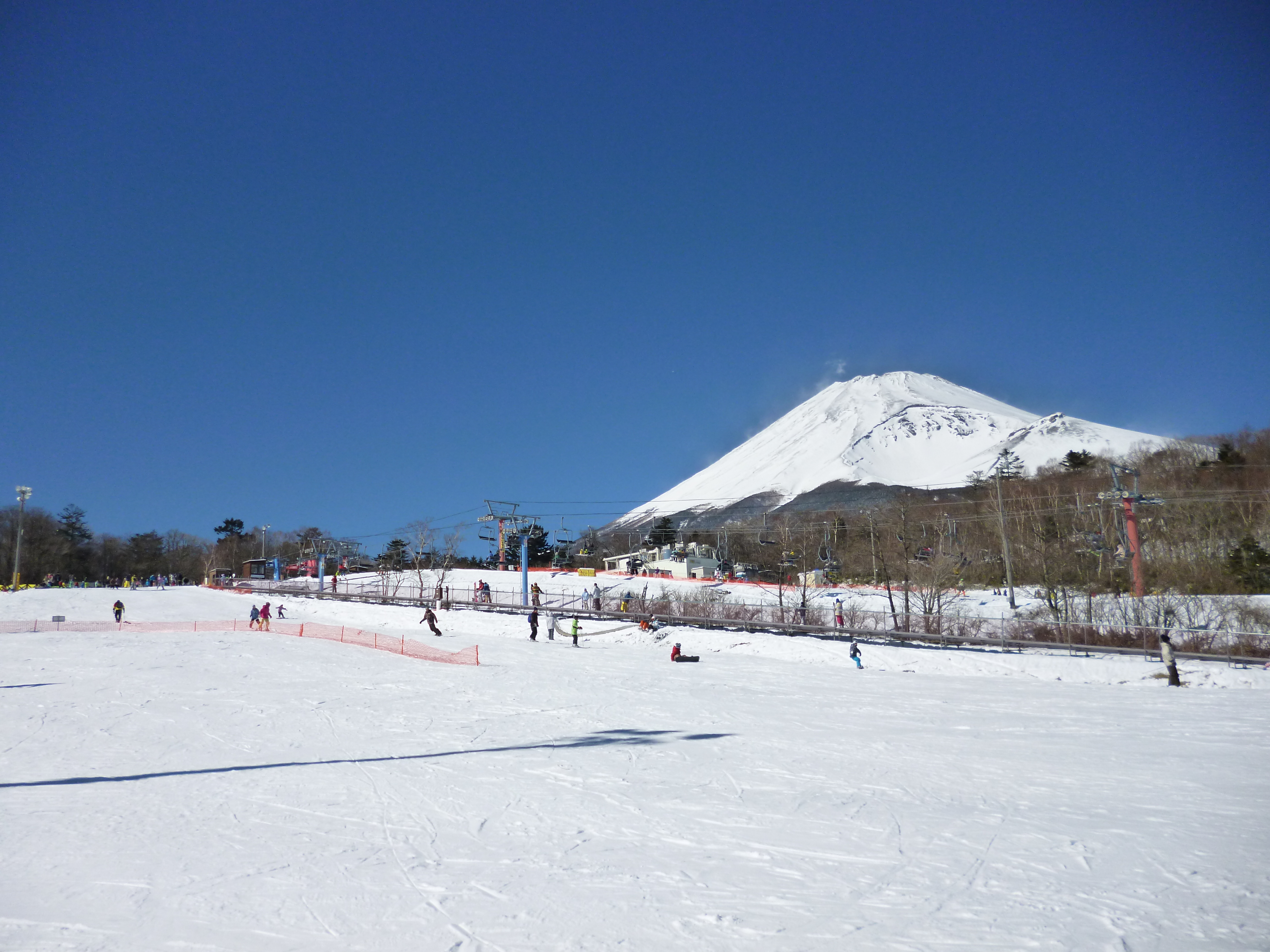
Snowtown Yeti & Mount Fuji Susono

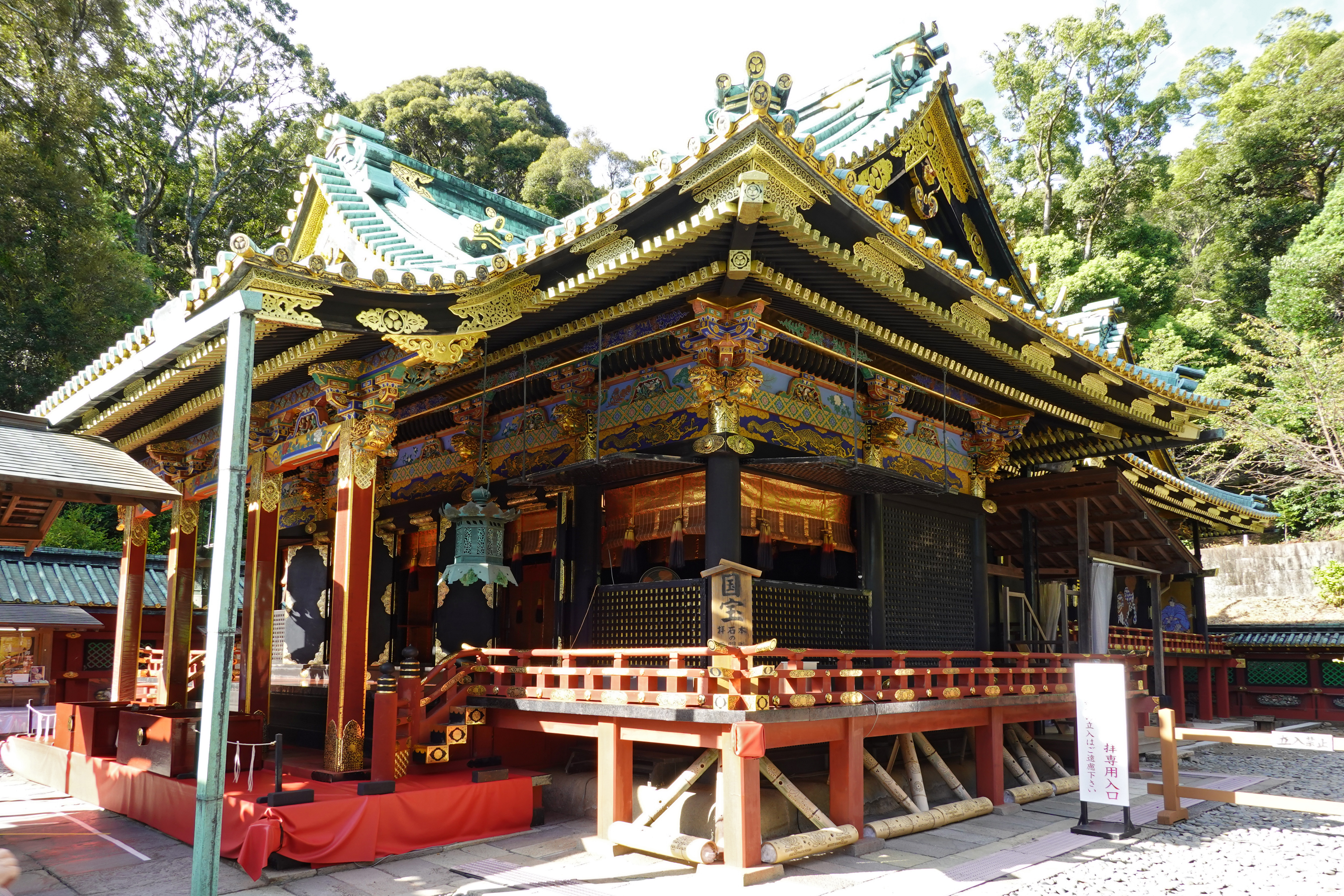
Kunōzan Tōshō-gū Shizuoka Suruga-ku

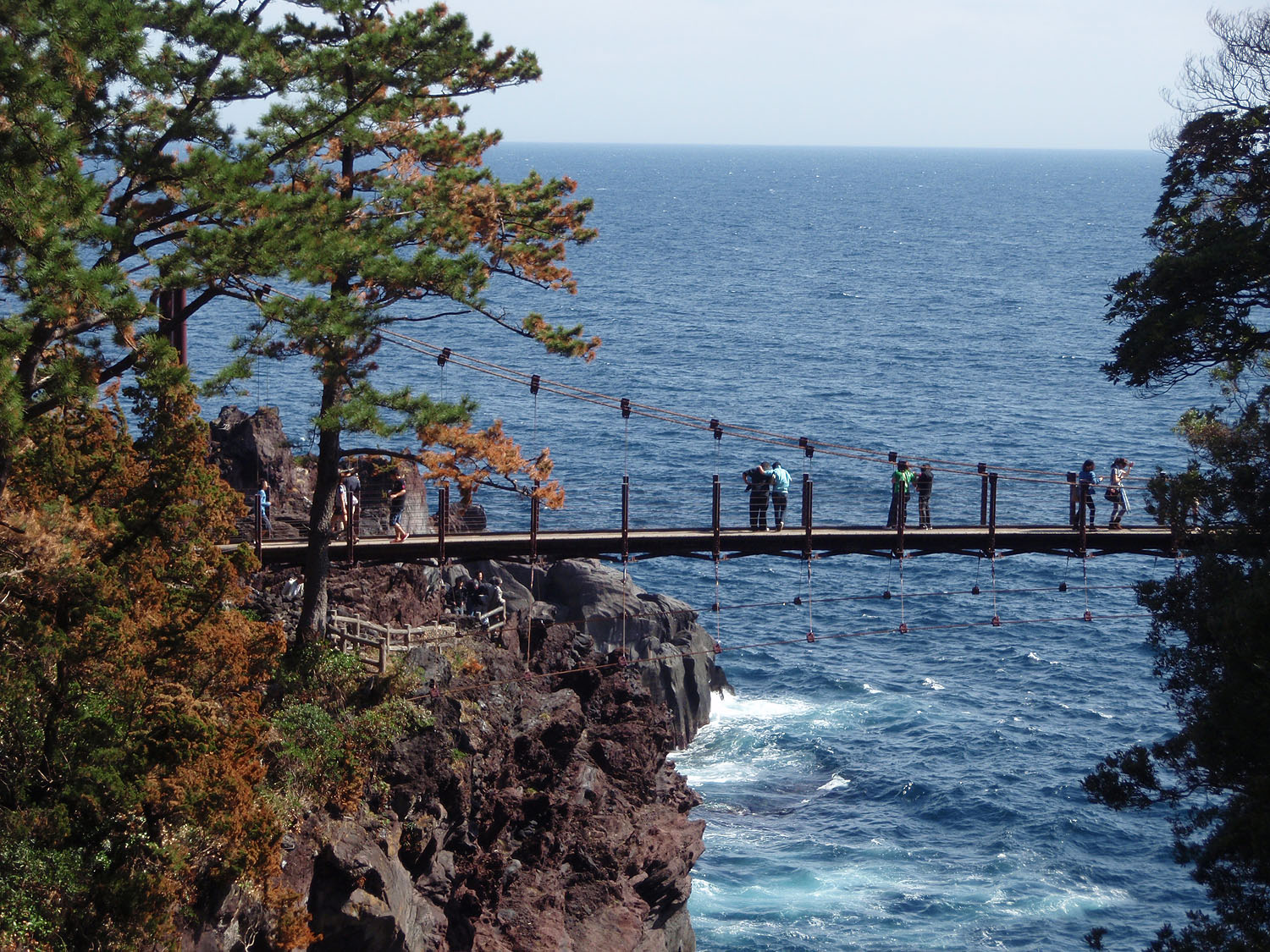
Jogasaki Coast Itō

== Notable people ==
Motoo Kimura (木村 資生, 1924–1994), biologist and theoretical population geneticist, died in Shizuoka Prefecture
