= Toyohashi =

Toyohashi 豊橋市
- Core city
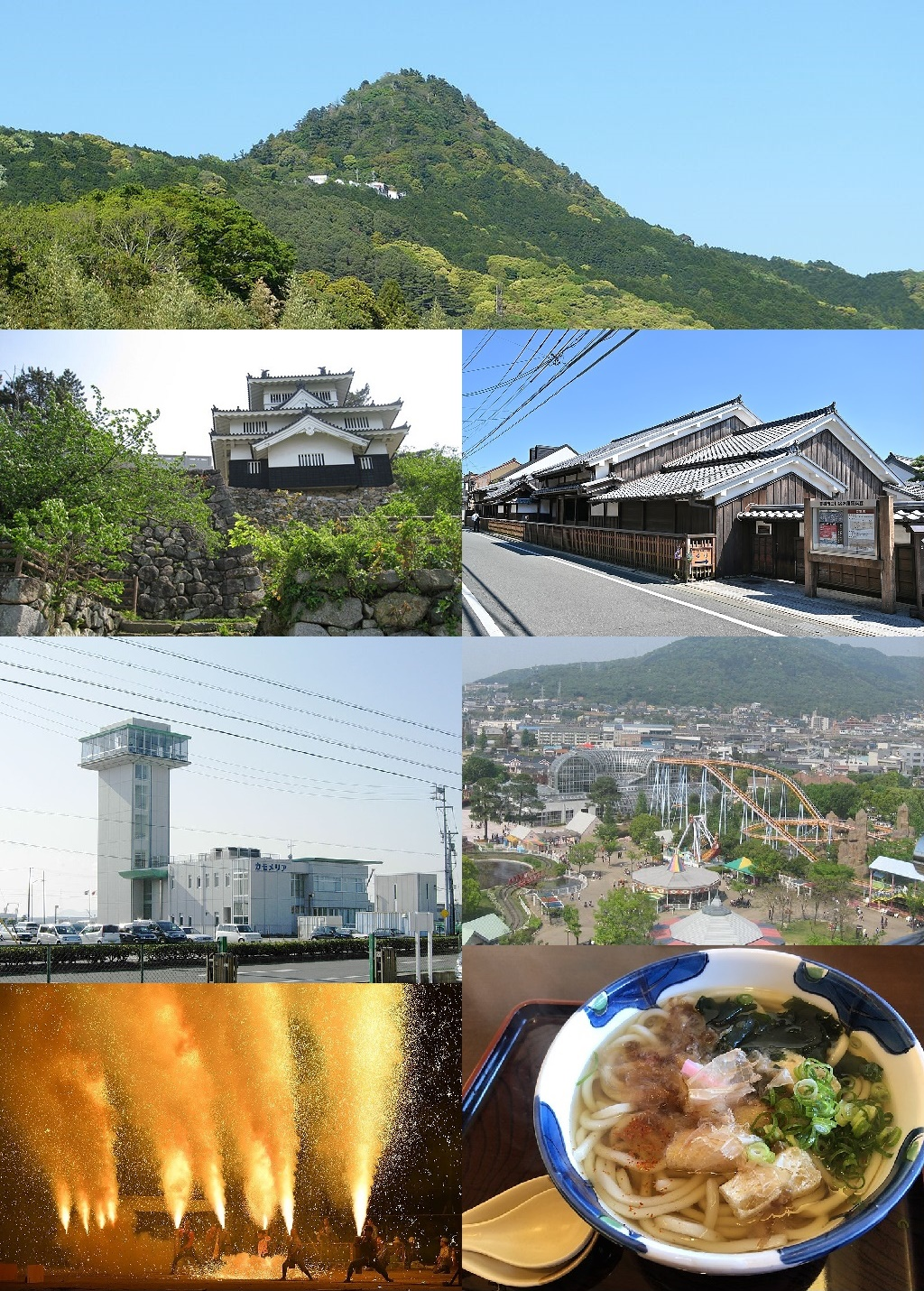
Mount Ishimaki
Yoshida Castle	Futagawa-juku
Port of Toyohashi	Toyohashi Zoo and Botanical Park
Tezutsu-hanabi	Nikake-Udon
- Flag Coat of arms

- Location of Toyohashi in Aichi Prefecture

- Coordinates: 34°46′9″N 137°23′29.5″E
- Country: Japan
- Region: Chūbu (Tōkai)
- Prefecture: Aichi Prefecture

Government
  - Mayor: Naoto Nagasaka

Area
  - Total: 261.86 km^{2} (101.10 sq mi)

Population (December 1, 2019)
  - Total: 377,453
  - Density: 1,441.4/km^{2} (3,733.3/sq mi)
- Time zone: UTC+9 (Japan Standard Time)
- Phone number: 0532-51-2111
- Address: 1 Imabashi-chō, Toyohashi-shi, Aichi-ken 440-8501
- Climate: Cfa
- Website: Official website
- Symbols
- Flower: Azalea
- Tree: Camphor laurel

Toyohashi (豊橋市, Toyohashi-shi; Japanese pronunciation: [tò̞.jó̞.hä̀.ɕì, -hä́.ɕí.ɕì]) is a city in Aichi Prefecture, Japan. As of 1 December 2019, the city had an estimated population of 377,453 in 160,516 households and a population density of 1,400 persons per km^{2}. The total area of the city was 261.86 square kilometres (101.10 sq mi). By area, Toyohashi was Aichi Prefecture's second-largest city until March 31, 2005, when it was surpassed by the city of Toyota, which had merged with six peripheral municipalities.

== Geography ==
Toyohashi is located in southeastern Aichi Prefecture, and is the capital of the informal "Higashi-Mikawa Region" of the prefecture. It is bordered by Shizuoka Prefecture to the east, and by Mikawa Bay and the headlands of the Atsumi Peninsula to the west. To the south is the Enshū Sea of the Pacific Ocean. The presence of the warm Kuroshio Current offshore gives the city a temperate climate. The Katahama Jusan-ri Beach (片浜十三里) stretching in adjacent city of Tahara to the west, Toyohashi, and the city of Hamamatsu to the east is a sea turtle nesting spot.

=== Climate ===
The city has a climate characterized by hot and humid summers, and relatively mild winters (Köppen climate classification Cfa). The average annual temperature in Toyohashi is 16.3 °C (61.3 °F). The average annual rainfall is 1,651.3 mm (65.01 in) with September as the wettest month. The temperatures are highest on average in August, at around 27.5 °C (81.5 °F), and lowest in January, at around 5.4 °C (41.7 °F).

Climate data for Toyohashi (2006−2020 normals, extremes 2005−present)
Month	Jan	Feb	Mar	Apr	May	Jun	Jul	Aug	Sep	Oct	Nov	Dec	Year
Record high °C (°F)	17.0 (62.6)	21.7 (71.1)	23.3 (73.9)	26.7 (80.1)	30.3 (86.5)	34.1 (93.4)	36.9 (98.4)	37.9 (100.2)	35.5 (95.9)	31.2 (88.2)	26.1 (79.0)	22.4 (72.3)	37.9 (100.2)
Mean daily maximum °C (°F)	9.2 (48.6)	10.4 (50.7)	14.0 (57.2)	18.6 (65.5)	23.2 (73.8)	25.9 (78.6)	29.6 (85.3)	31.5 (88.7)	28.4 (83.1)	23.2 (73.8)	17.3 (63.1)	11.8 (53.2)	20.3 (68.5)
Daily mean °C (°F)	5.4 (41.7)	6.4 (43.5)	9.5 (49.1)	14.3 (57.7)	19.0 (66.2)	22.3 (72.1)	26.0 (78.8)	27.5 (81.5)	24.4 (75.9)	19.1 (66.4)	13.3 (55.9)	8.0 (46.4)	16.3 (61.3)
Mean daily minimum °C (°F)	1.7 (35.1)	2.5 (36.5)	5.2 (41.4)	10.0 (50.0)	15.1 (59.2)	19.2 (66.6)	23.2 (73.8)	24.3 (75.7)	21.0 (69.8)	15.4 (59.7)	9.3 (48.7)	4.1 (39.4)	12.6 (54.7)
Record low °C (°F)	−4.3 (24.3)	−4.4 (24.1)	−1.6 (29.1)	1.3 (34.3)	8.3 (46.9)	12.9 (55.2)	18.7 (65.7)	19.3 (66.7)	12.5 (54.5)	6.5 (43.7)	0.7 (33.3)	−2.2 (28.0)	−4.4 (24.1)
Average precipitation mm (inches)	50.3 (1.98)	79.9 (3.15)	127.5 (5.02)	150.9 (5.94)	178.1 (7.01)	184.6 (7.27)	198.6 (7.82)	126.8 (4.99)	206.9 (8.15)	210.9 (8.30)	79.6 (3.13)	57.2 (2.25)	1,651.3 (65.01)
Average precipitation days (≥ 1.0 mm)	5.3	6.4	8.4	9.3	8.9	11.3	10.8	7.1	10.7	10.0	6.7	5.5	100.4
Mean monthly sunshine hours	197.8	178.4	210.2	207.9	223.7	161.8	186.6	236.8	171.1	166.1	170.0	183.4	2,293.8
Source: Japan Meteorological Agency

=== Demographics ===
Toyohashi MEA

Per Japanese census data, the population of Toyohashi has grown steadily over the past 60 years.

Historical population
Year	Pop.	±%
1950	185,984	—
1960	215,515	+15.9%
1970	258,547	+20.0%
1980	304,273	+17.7%
1990	337,982	+11.1%
2000	364,865	+8.0%
2010	376,861	+3.3%

=== Neighboring municipalities ===
Aichi Prefecture

- Shinshiro
- Tahara
- Toyokawa

Shizuoka Prefecture

- Hamana-ku, Hamamatsu
- Kosai

=== City scape ===
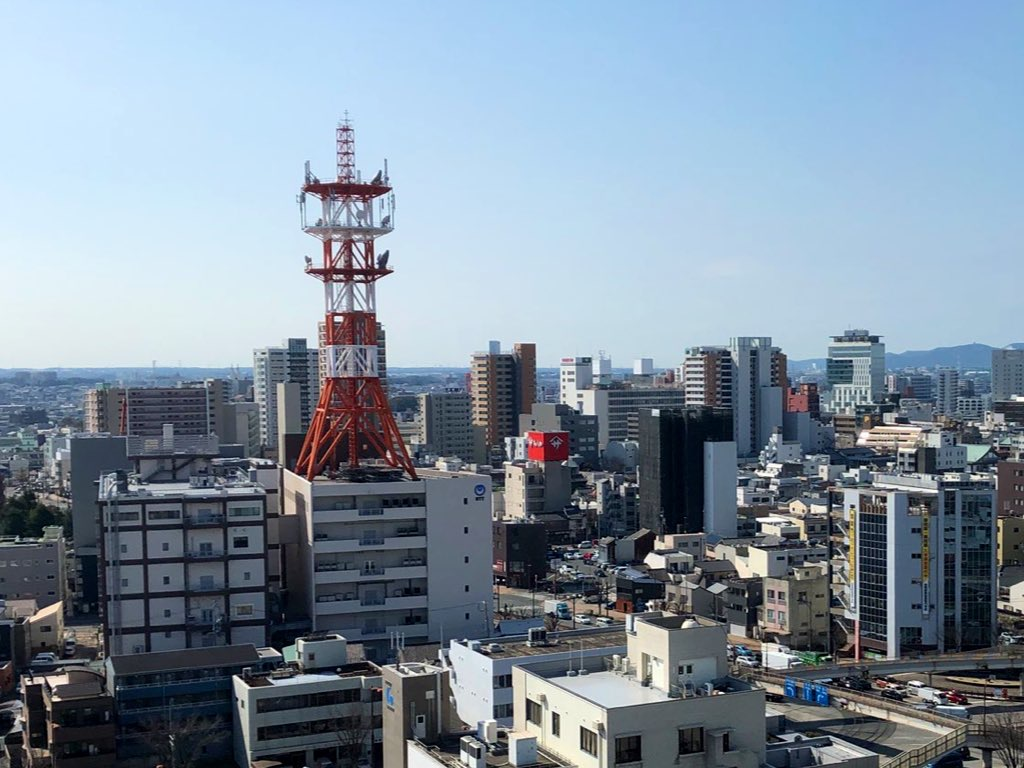
Skyline of Toyohashi

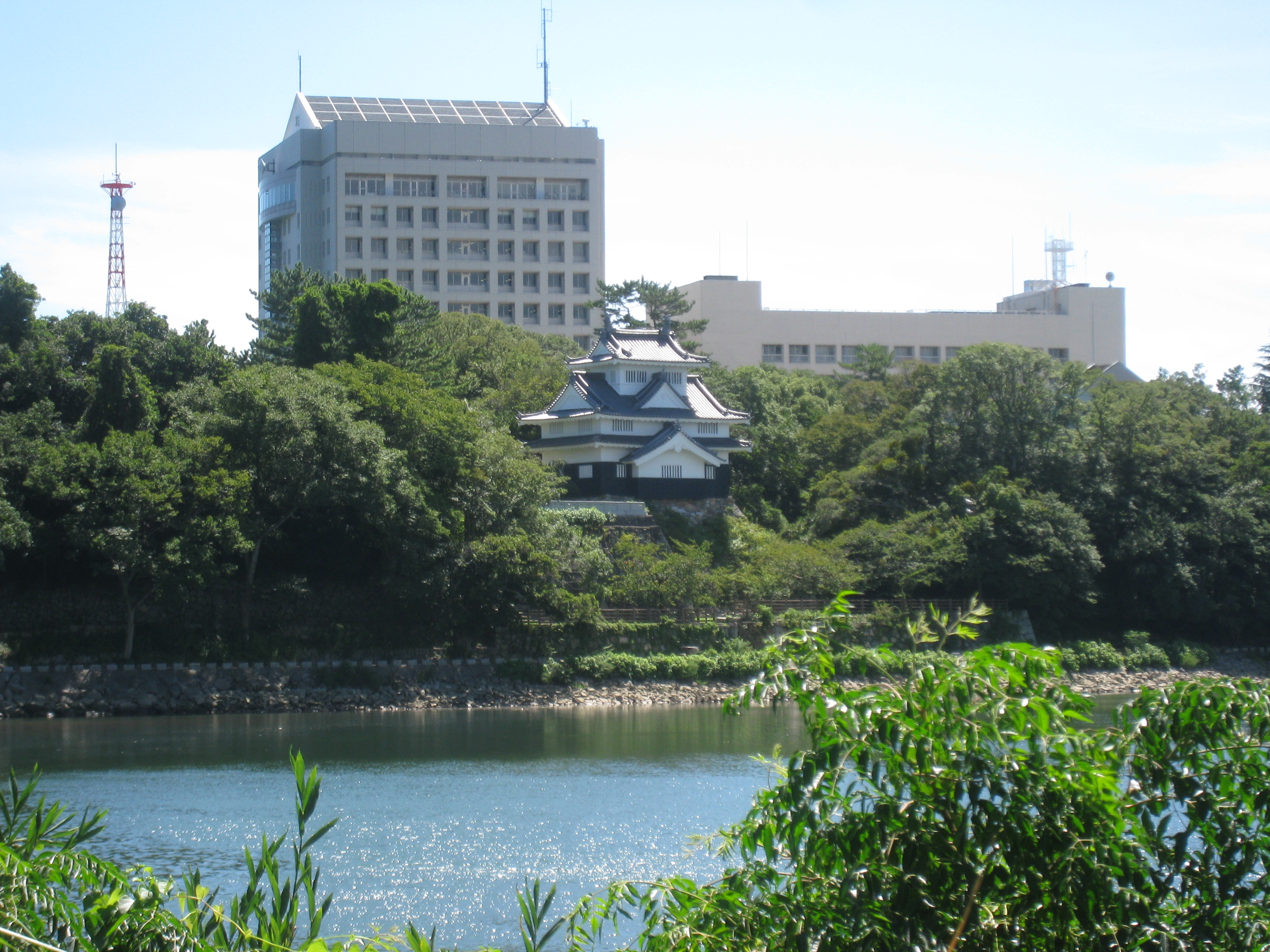
Yoshida Castle

The street in front of Toyohashi Station, 2022

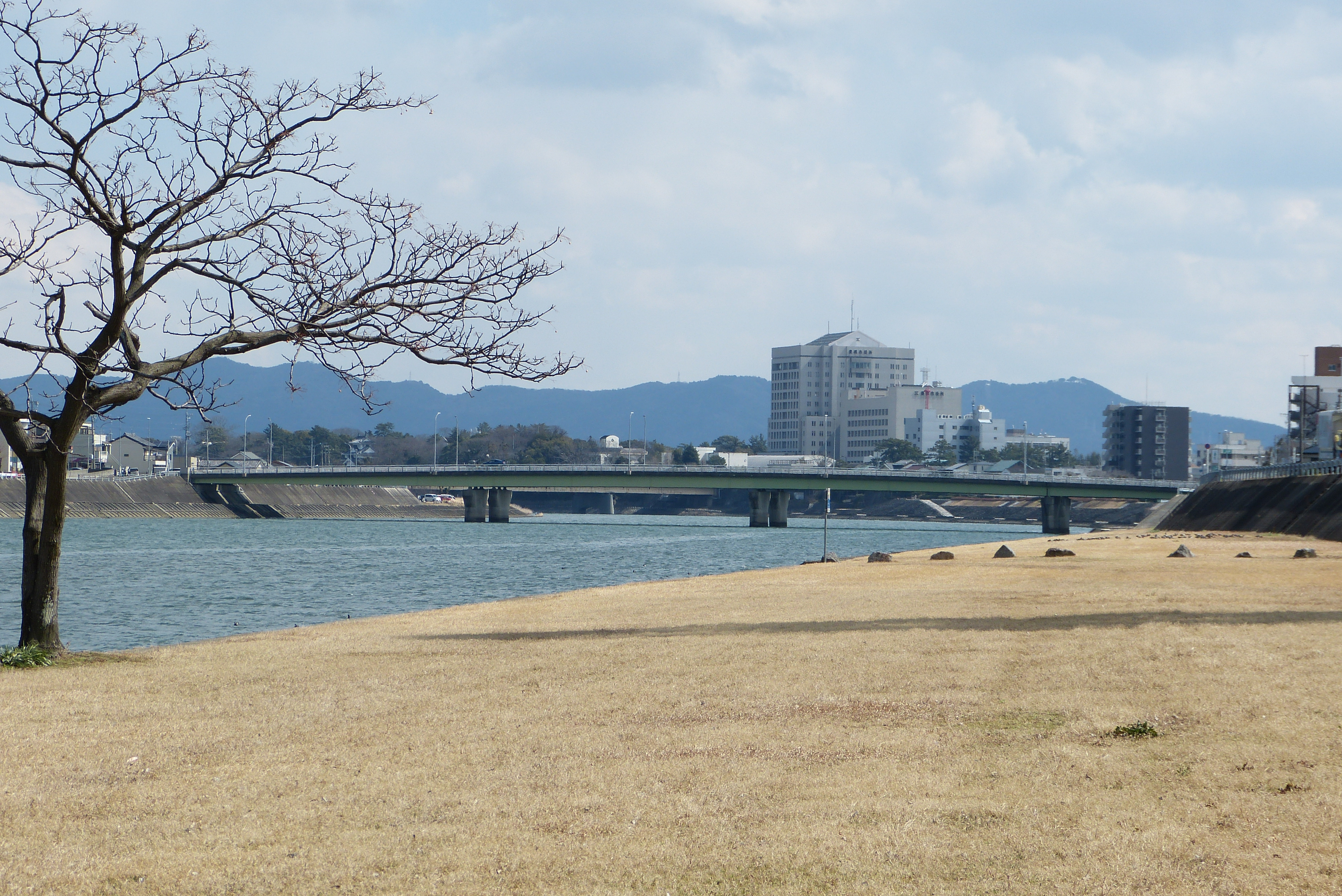
Toyokawa Bridge and Toyo River

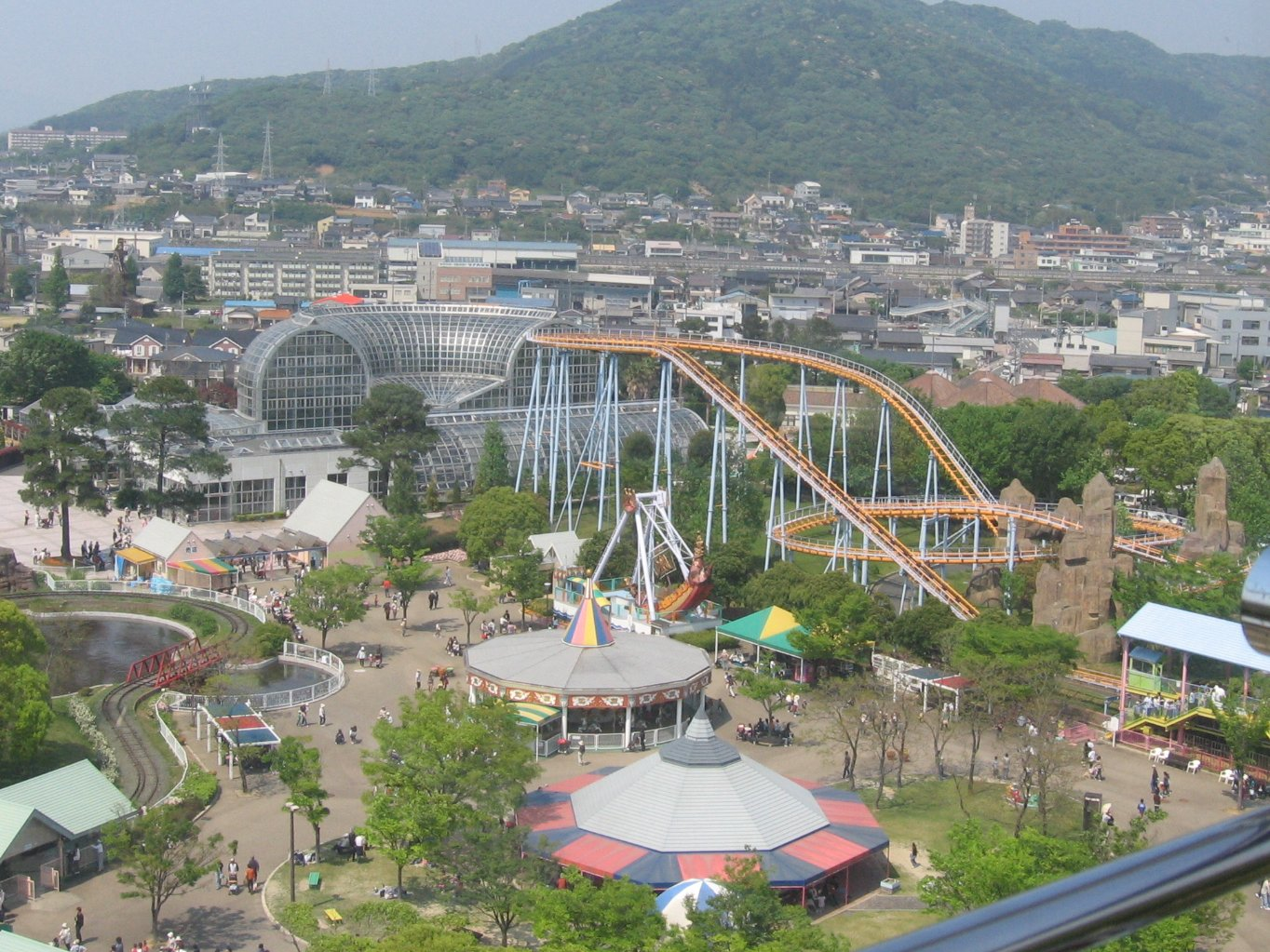
Toyohashi Zoo and Botanical Park

== History ==
=== Origins ===
The area around present-day Toyohashi has been inhabited for many thousands of years. Archaeologists have found human remains from the Japanese Paleolithic period, which have been carbon dated to more than 10,000 BC along with the bones of Naumann elephants.

Numerous remains from the Jōmon period, and especially from the Yayoi and Kofun periods have also been found, including many kofun burial mounds.

During the Nara period, the area was assigned to Atsumi, Hoi and Yana Districts of Mikawa Province and prospered during subsequent periods as a post town on an important river crossing of the Tōkaidō connecting the capital with the eastern provinces.

=== Sengoku period ===
During the Sengoku period, the area was a highly contested zone between the Imagawa clan based in Suruga Province and various local warlords, who built a number of fortifications in the area, including Yoshida Castle. The rising power of the Matsudaira clan and its alliance with Oda Nobunaga eventually neutralized the threat posed by the Imagawa, and the area became part of the holdings of Tokugawa Ieyasu. Following the Battle of Odawara in 1590, Toyotomi Hideyoshi ordered the Tokugawa clan to relocate to the Kantō region and assigned the castle to Ikeda Terumasa. Ikeda developed the surrounding castle town and embarked on a massive and ambitious plan to rebuild Yoshida Castle. However, following the Battle of Sekigahara, he was relocated to Himeji Castle.

=== Edo period ===
After the establishment of the Tokugawa shogunate, Yoshida Castle became the center of Yoshida Domain, a clan fief. The domain was assigned to several different fudai daimyō clans until coming into the possession of the Matsudaira (Nagasawa-Ōkōchi) clan in 1752, which remained in residence at Yoshida until the Meiji Restoration. The final daimyō of Yoshida, Matsudaira Nobuhisa, surrendered the domain to the Meiji government in 1868. In 1869, the name of the domain was formally changed from Yoshida to Toyohashi.

=== Meiji period ===
With the establishment of the modern municipalities system under the Meiji government in 1879, Toyohashi Town was created within Atsumi District, Aichi Prefecture. Toyohashi Zoo was established in 1899. The town achieved city status in 1906.

=== Taishō period ===
A tram system (the present-day Toyohashi Railway Asumadai Main Line) was established in 1925.

=== Shōwa period ===
In 1932, Toyohashi expanded its borders by annexing Shimoji Town (Hoi District), Takashi Village, Muroyoshida Village (Atsumi District), and Shimokawa Village (Yana District). Toyohashi suffered considerable damage during the 1944 Tōnankai earthquake, and even more damage during the Toyohashi Air Raid, which destroyed more than 60% of the city in June 1945.

=== Modern Toyohashi ===
In 1955, Toyohashi's geographic extent was expanded again with the annexation of neighboring Maeshiba Village (Hoi District), Futagawa Village, Takatoyo Village, Oitsu Village (Atsumi District) and Ishimaki Village (Yana District). Toyohashi achieved core city status in 1999 with increased autonomy from the prefectural government.

== Government ==
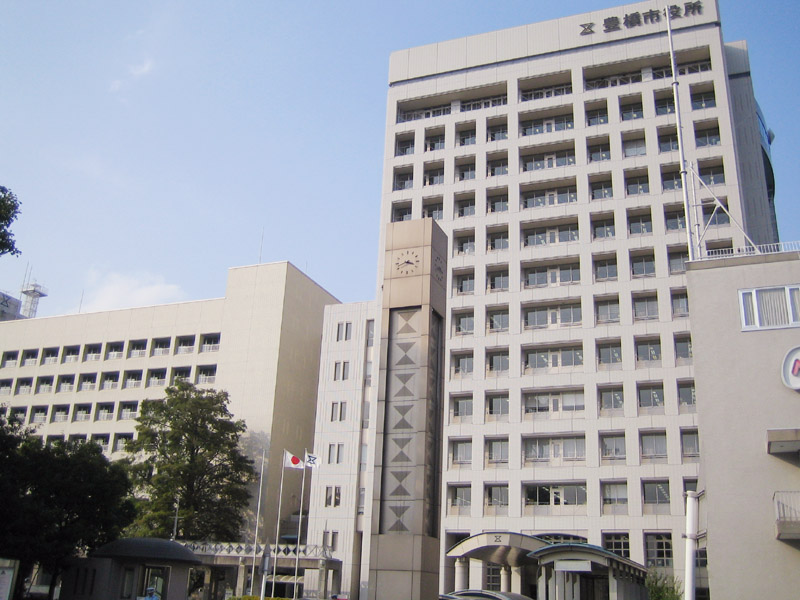
Toyohashi City Office

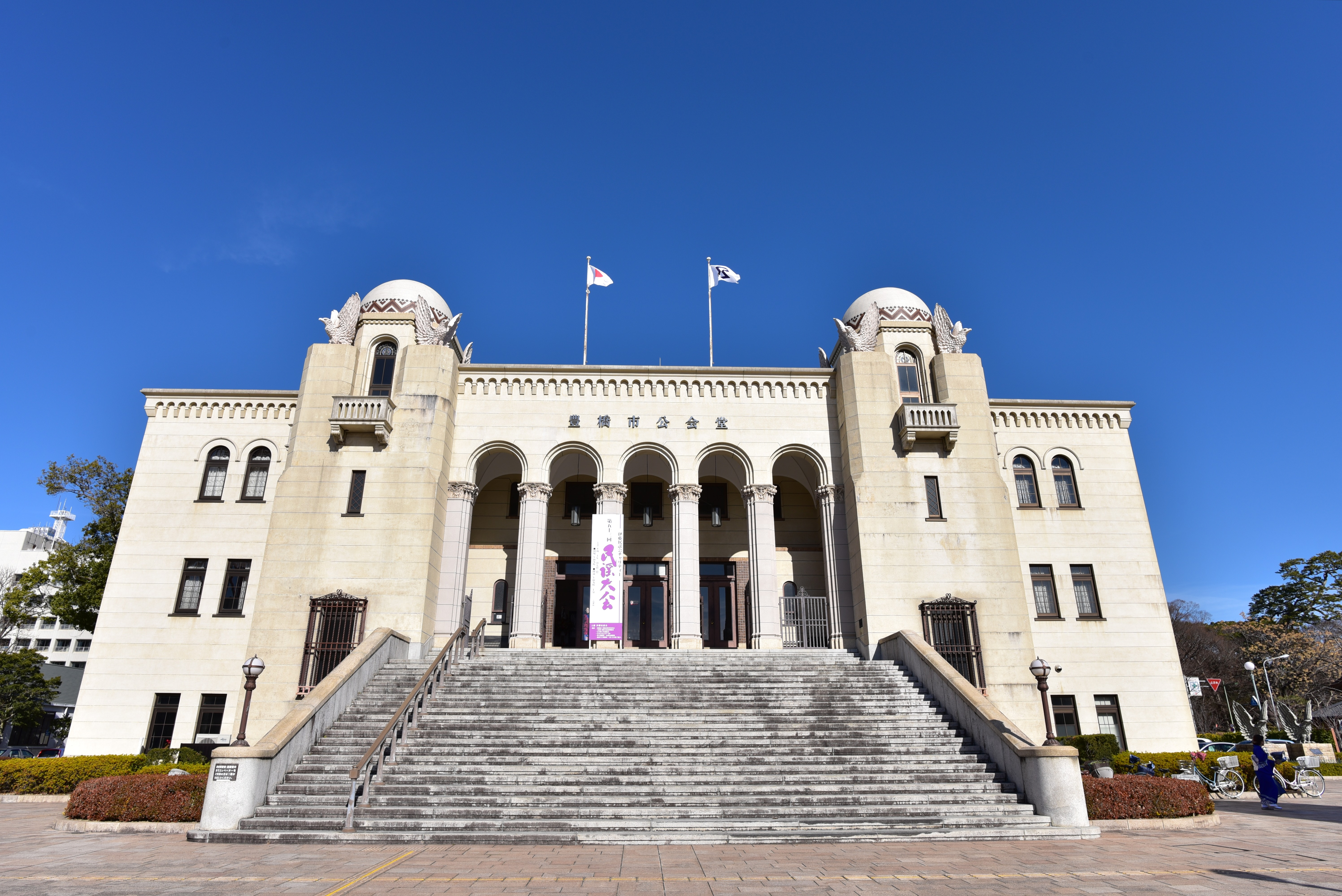
Toyohashi City Public Hall

=== Mayor-council ===
Toyohashi has a mayor-council form of government with a directly elected mayor and a unicameral city legislature of 36 members.

=== Prefectural Assembly ===
The city contributes five members to the Aichi Prefectural Assembly.

=== House of Representatives ===
In terms of national politics, the city is part of Aichi District15 of the lower house of the Diet of Japan.

=== List of mayors of Toyohashi (from 1907) ===
Mayor	Term
Kiroku Okuchi (大口喜六)	7 January 1907 to 10 January 1912 (first term); 27 April 1914 to 20 February 1916 (second term); 17 September 1938 to 10 December 1940 (third term)
Shojuro Takahashi (高橋小十郎)	12 February 1912 to 8 March 1913
Bengo Sakakibara (榊原辨吾)	29 August 1913 to 28 March 1914
Tadao Hosotani (細谷忠男)	18 January 1917 to 20 August 1923
Ichitaro Yoshikawa (吉川一太郎)	10 June 1924 to 8 December 1925
Katsuzo Tamegai (田部井勝藏)	5 August 1926 to 4 August 1930

Mayor	Term
Tohei Marumo (丸茂藤平)	30 August 1930 to 29 August 1934
Shotaro Kanbe (神戸小三郎)	3 September 1934 to 7 July 1938
Junichiro Kondo (近藤寿市郎)	18 April 1941 to 17 April 1945
Tamotsu Mizuno (水野 保)	6 May 1945 to 29 January 1946
Shinobu Yokota (横田 忍)	29 March 1946 to 4 April 1947
Fujitomo Otake (大竹藤知)	5 April 1947 to 28 June 1952

Mayor	Term
Sacho Ono (大野佐長)	28 July 1952 to 30 June 1960
Mutsuro Kawai (河合陸郎)	1 July 1960 to 26 March 1975
Shigeru Aoki (青木 茂)	30 April 1975 to 26 April 1983
Akira Takahashi (高橋アキラ)	27 April 1983 to 2 October 1996
Masaru Hayakawa (早川 勝)	17 November 1996 to 16 November 2008
Koichi Sahara (佐原光一)	17 November 2008 to 16 November 2020
Yoshitaka Asai (浅井由崇)	17 November 2020 to present

== Public ==
=== Police ===
- Aichi Prefectural Police
  - Toyohashi police station

=== Firefighting ===
- Toyohashi Fire department
  - Toyohashi-Minami fire department
  - Toyohashi-Naka fire department

=== Health care ===
- Hospital
  - Toyohashi City Hospital

=== Post office ===
- Toyohashi Post office
- Toyohashi-Minami Post office

=== Library ===
- Toyohashi City Library
  - Toyohashi City Central Library
  - Toyohashi City Mukaiyama Liburary
  - Toyohashi City Oshimizu Liburary (Minakuru)
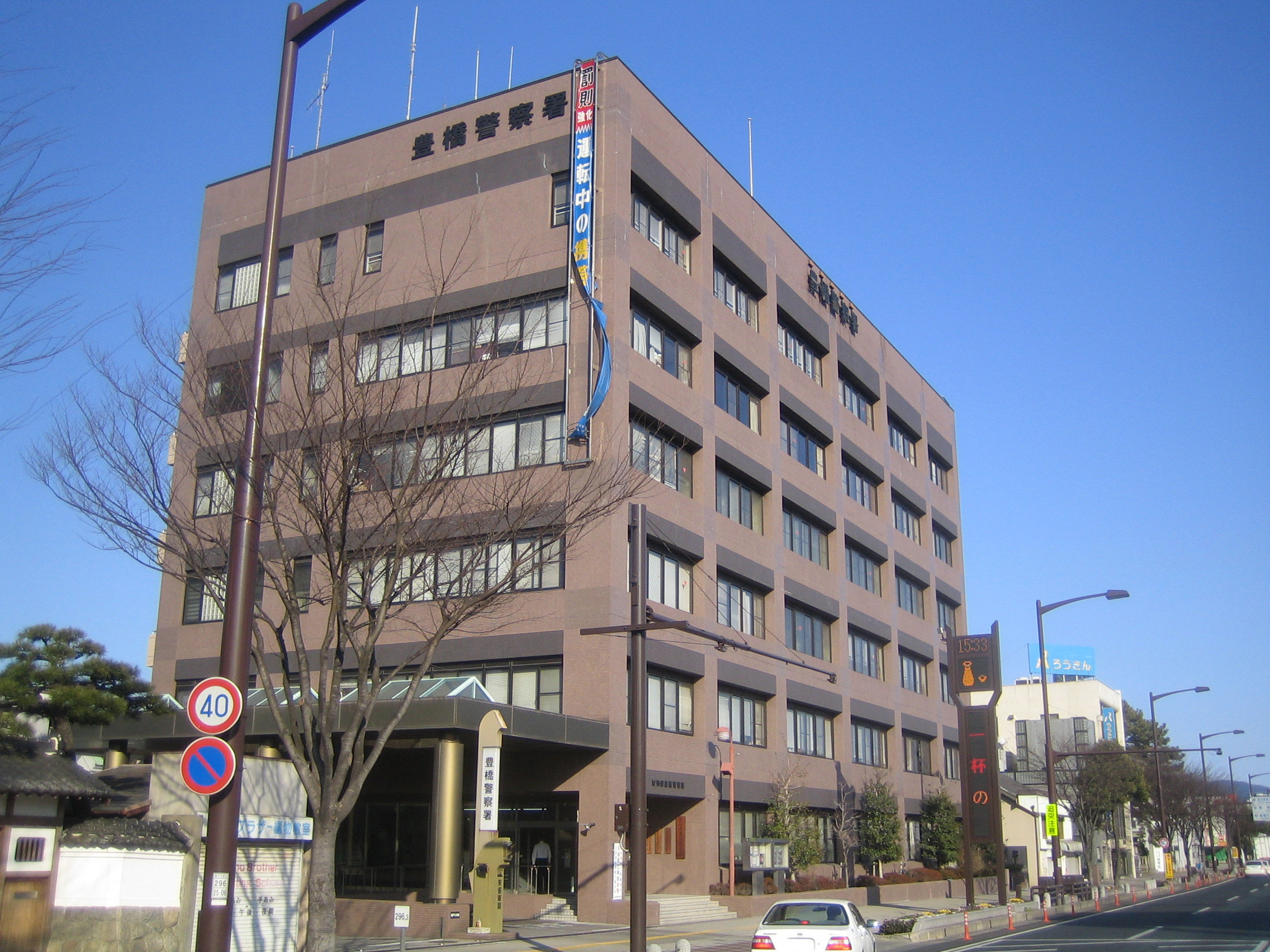
Toyohashi Police Station

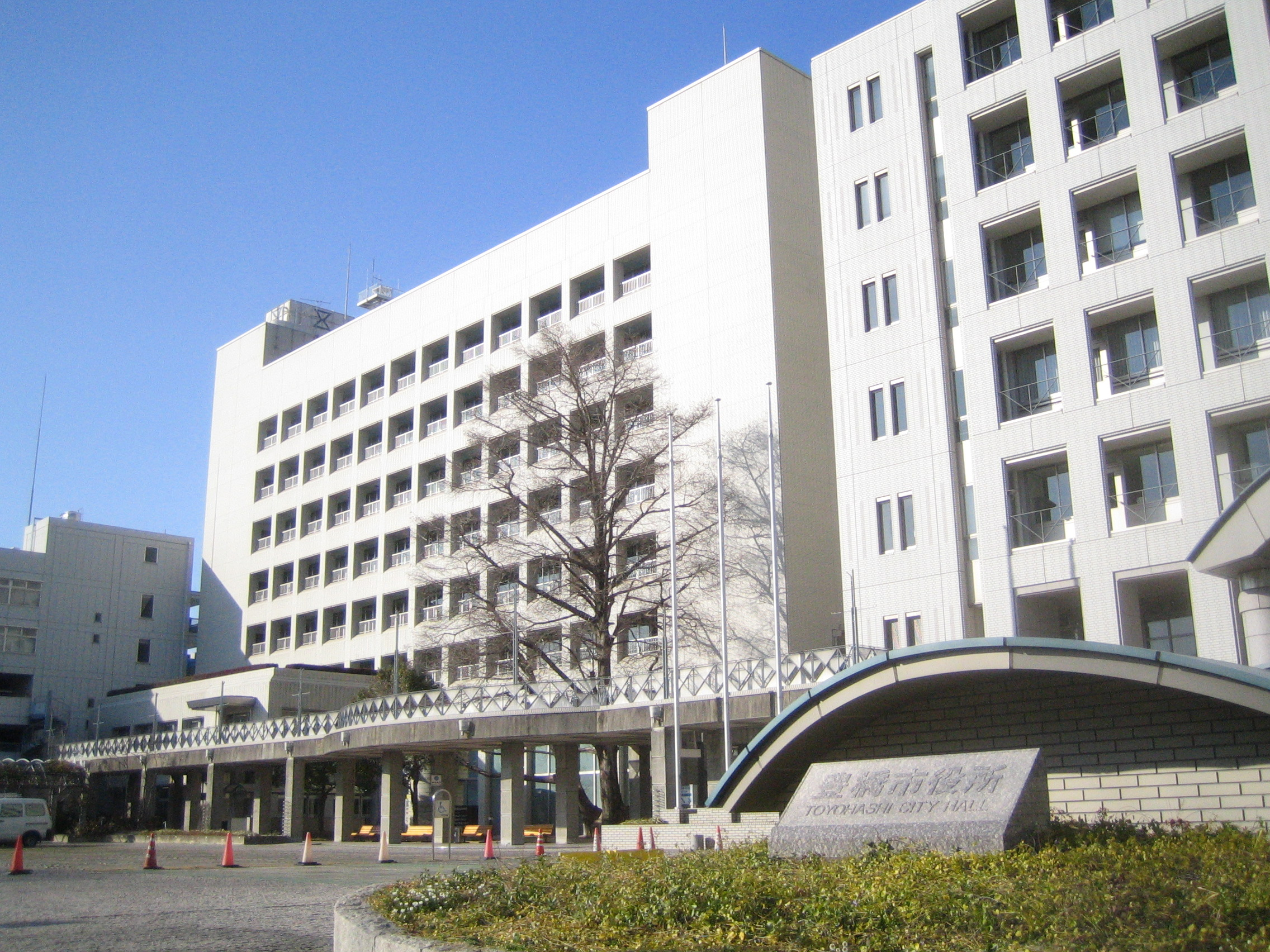
Toyohashi Fire Department

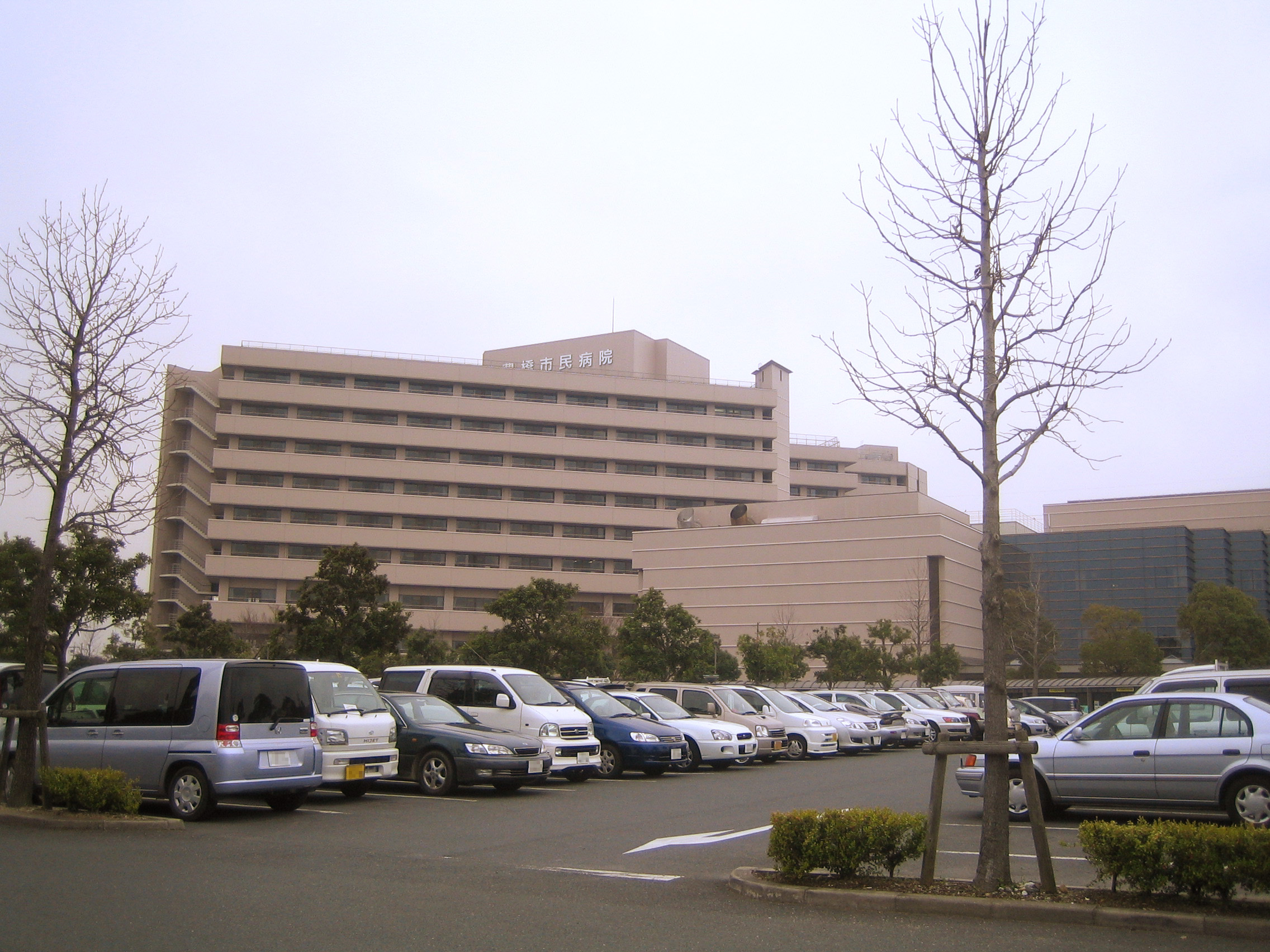
Toyohashi City Hospital

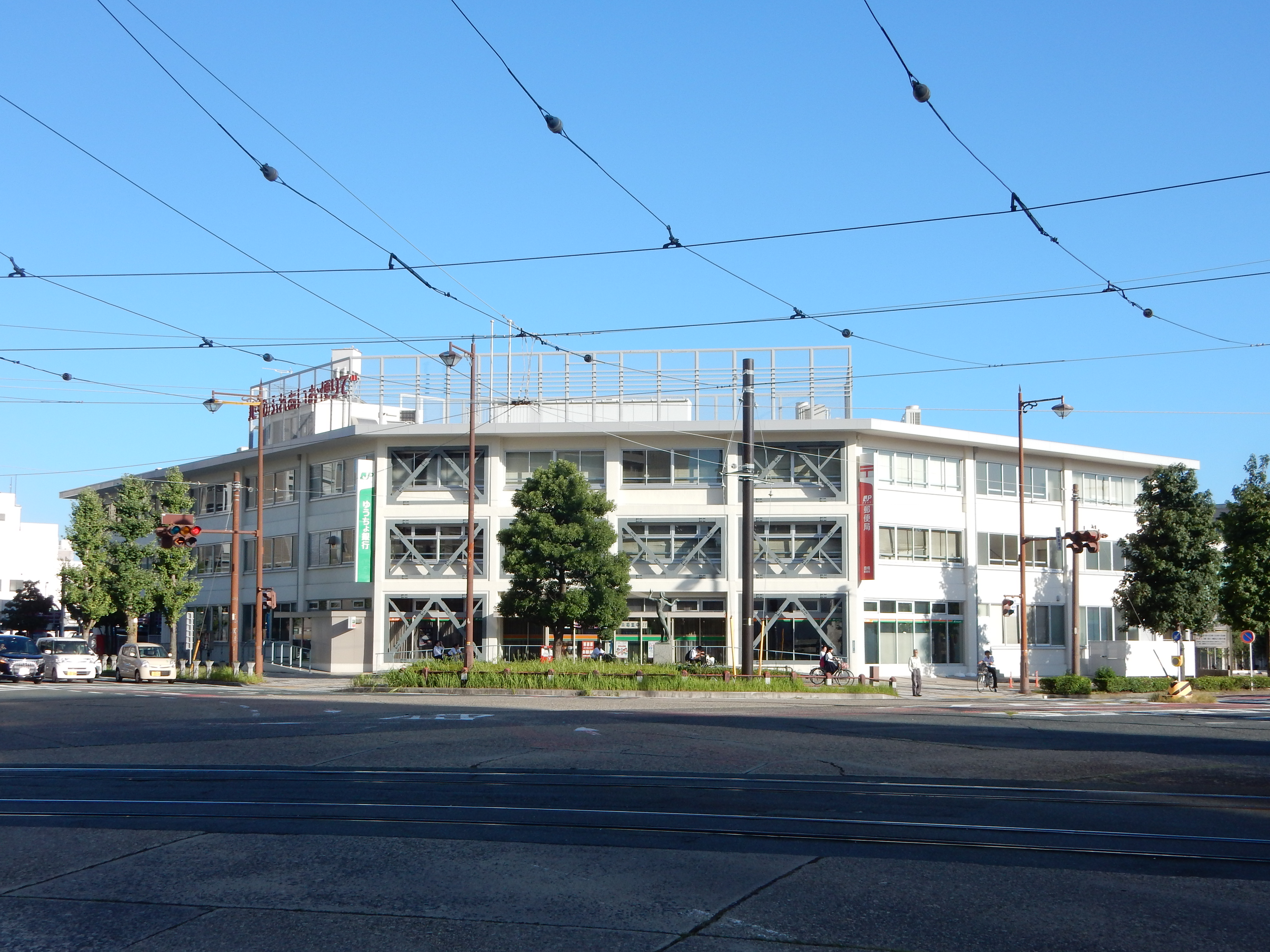
Toyohashi Post Office

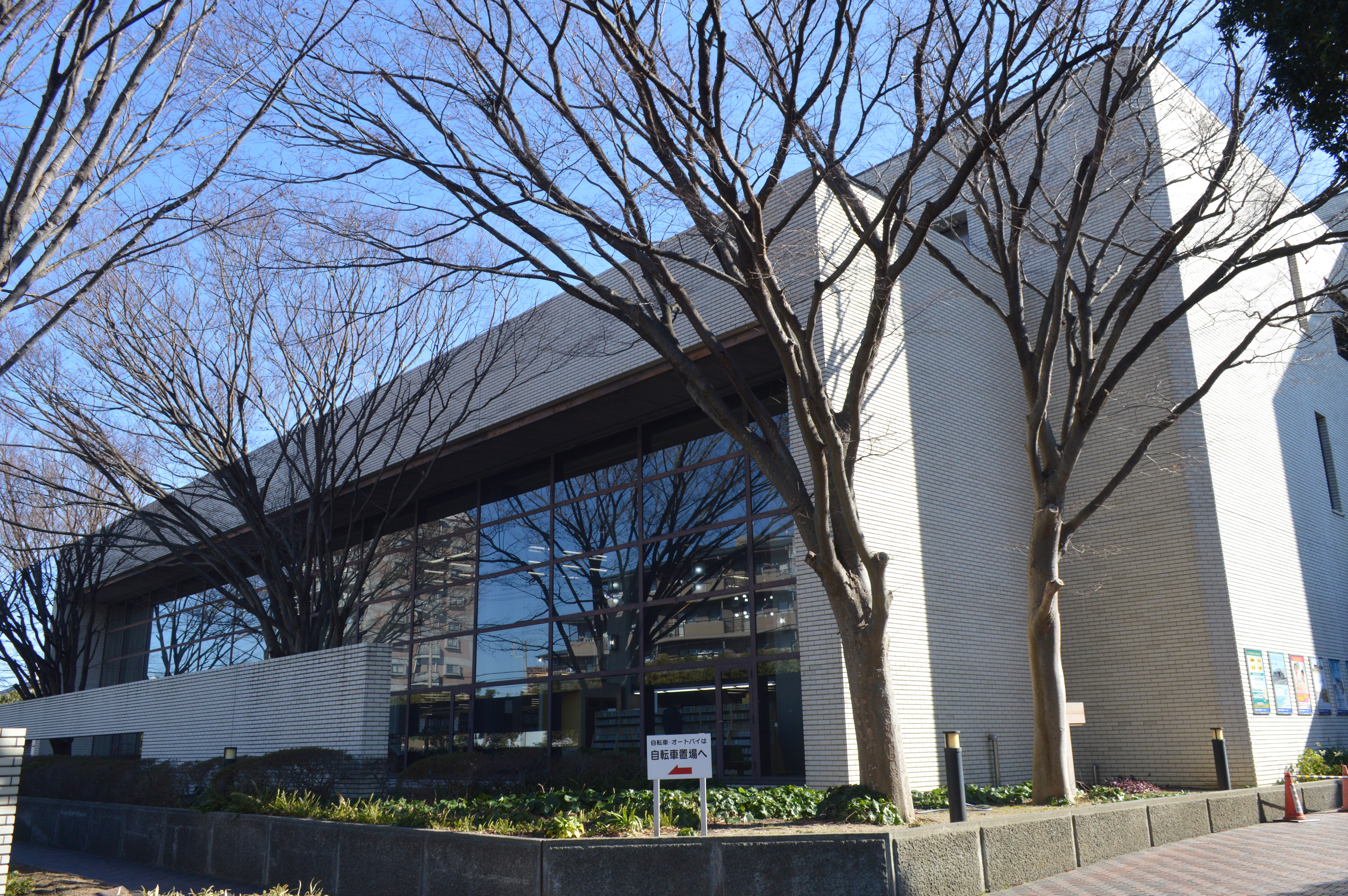
Toyohashi City Central Library

== International relations ==
Sister cities

- Nantong, Jiangsu, China, since May 1987
- Toledo, Ohio, United States, since April 2000
- Panevėžys, Lithuania, since June 2019

Friendship cities

- Jinju, South Gyeongsang, South Korea, since 1992
- Paranavaí, Paraná, Brazil, since 2008
- Wolfsburg, Lower Saxony, Germany, since 2011

== Economy ==
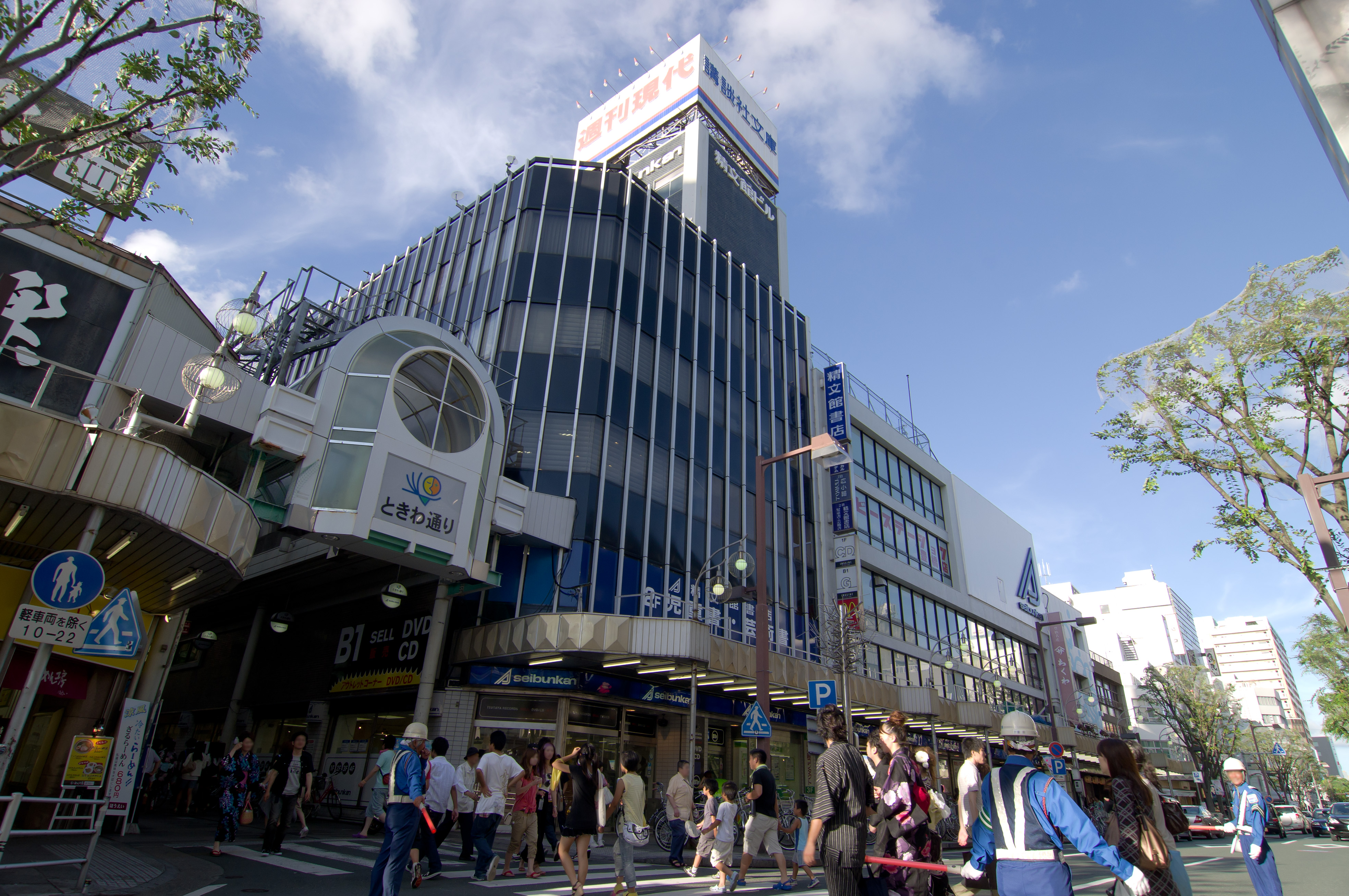
Downtown of Toyohashi City

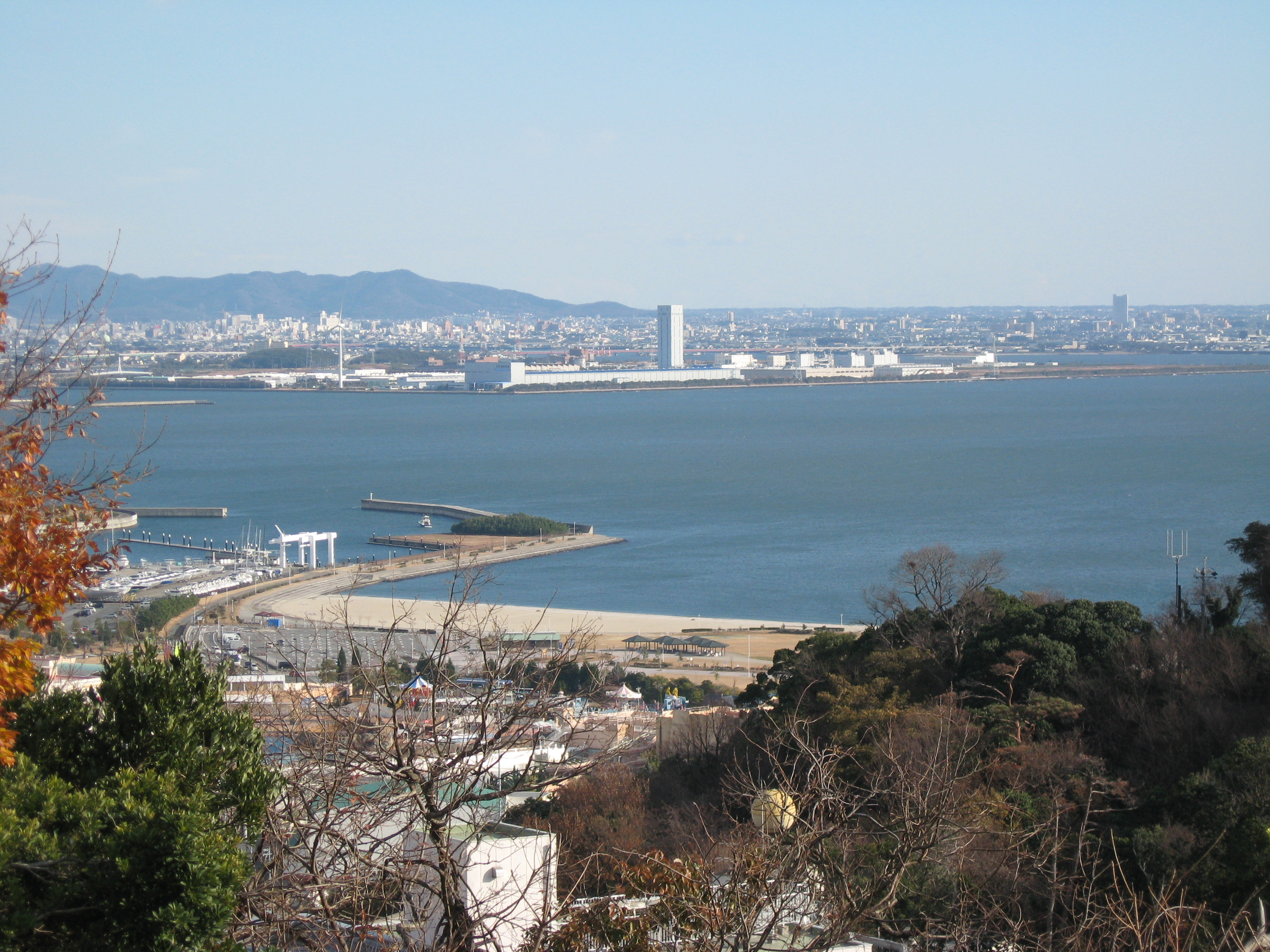
Port of Toyohashi

=== Agriculture ===
- Cabbage
- Napa cabbage
- Tomato
- Diospyros kaki
- Pyrus pyrifolia
- Grape
- Chikuwa

Japan Agricultural Cooperatives

- JA Toyohashi

=== Manufacturing ===
Industrial production is centered around the production of automotive-related components for Toyota, Mitsubishi, Suzuki Motors, and Honda, all of whom have factories in the region.

Motors

- Toyota
- Mitsubishi
- Suzuki Motors
- Honda
- VOLKSWAGEN Group Japan

=== Trade and services ===
Worldwide trade

Mikawa Port is a major port for worldwide trade, and its presence has made Toyohashi the largest import and export hub in Japan for automobiles, in volume terms. Compared to other ports around the world, Mikawa is roughly on a par with the German port of Bremerhaven.

Shopping center

- APiTA Mukaiyama
- Æon Toyohashi-Minami Shopping center
- Æon Town Toyohasihashira
- Cocola Avenue
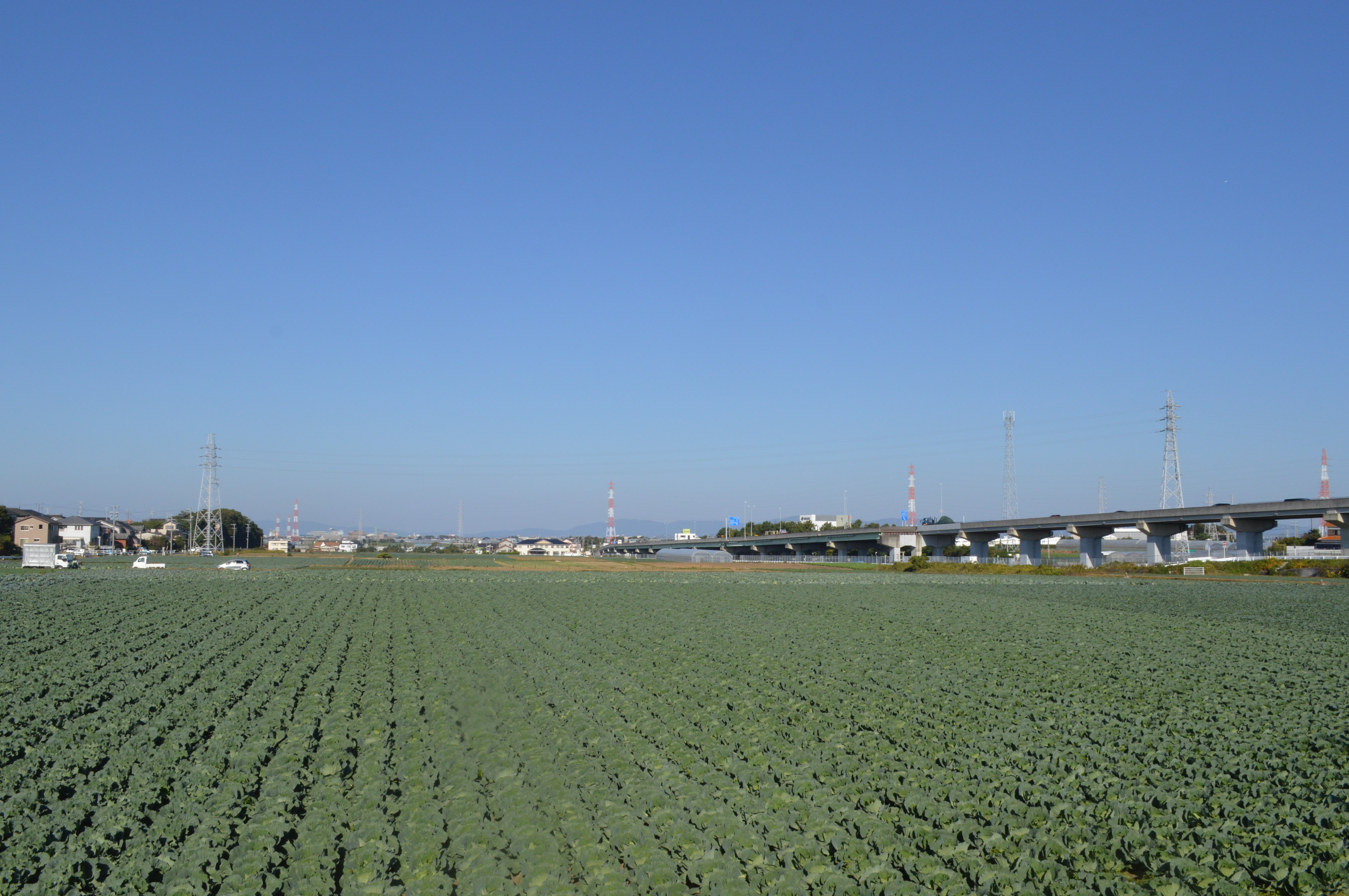
Cabbage field in Oshimizu-cho

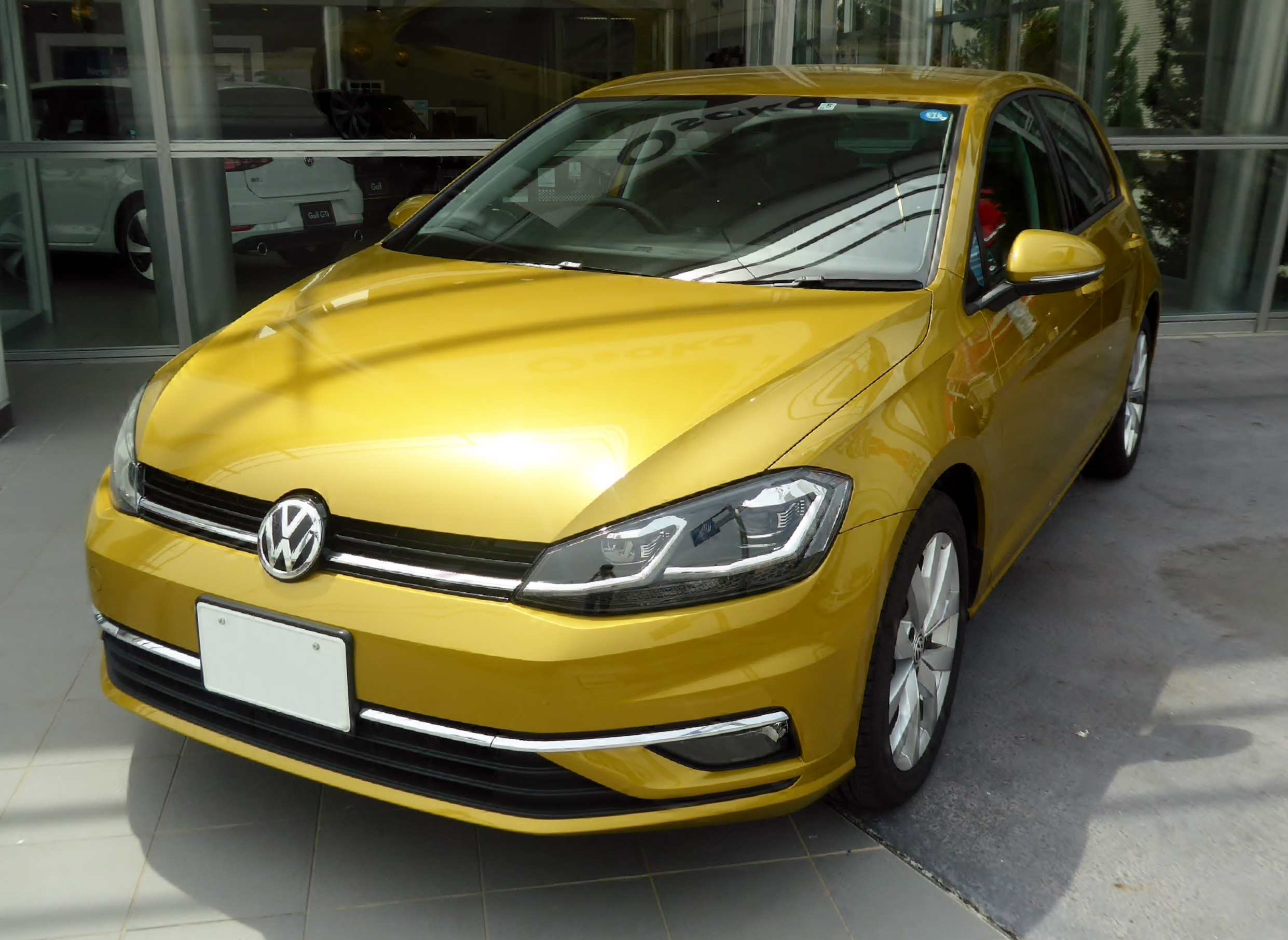
Volkswagen Golf Mk7

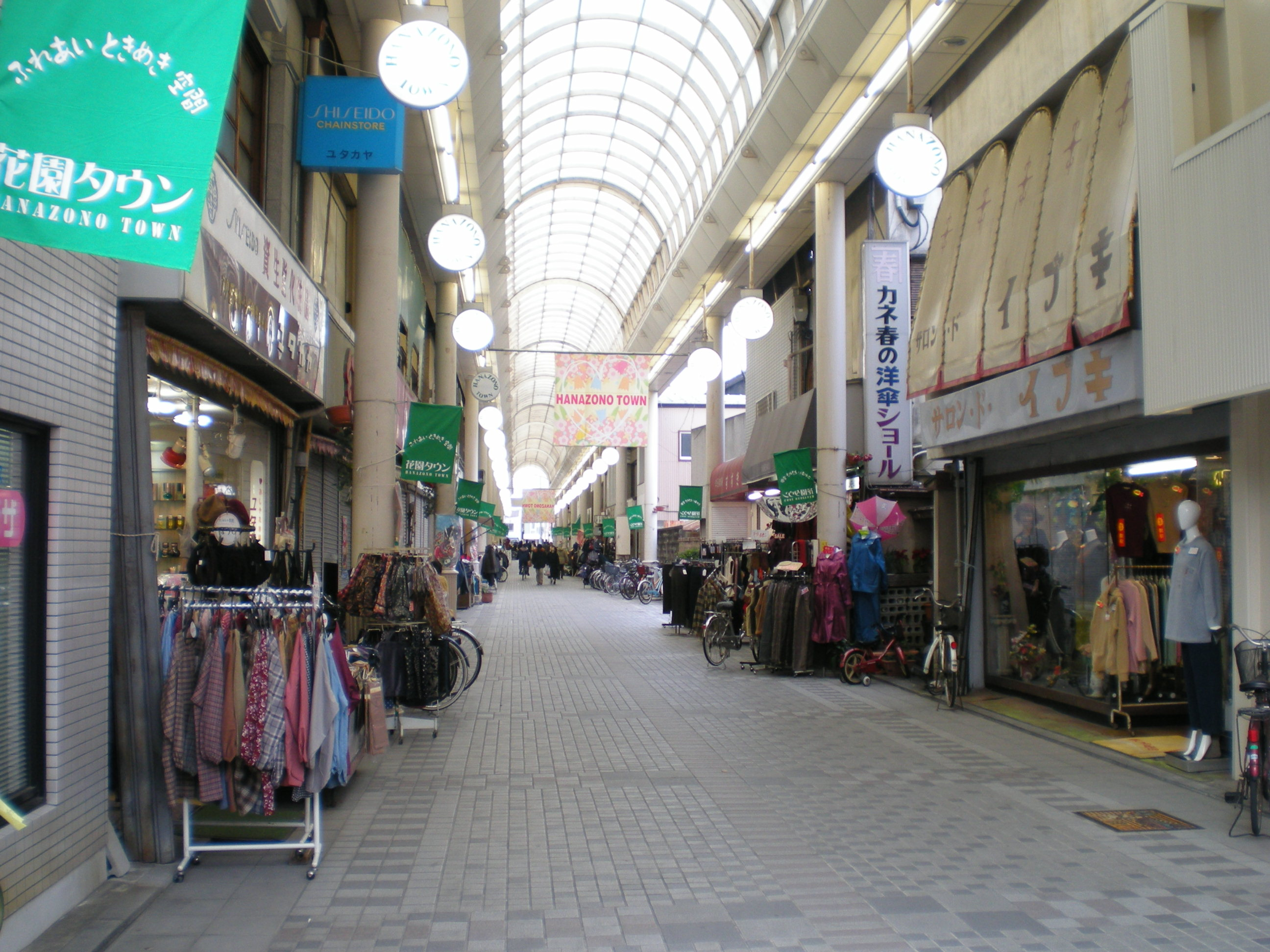
Shopping street

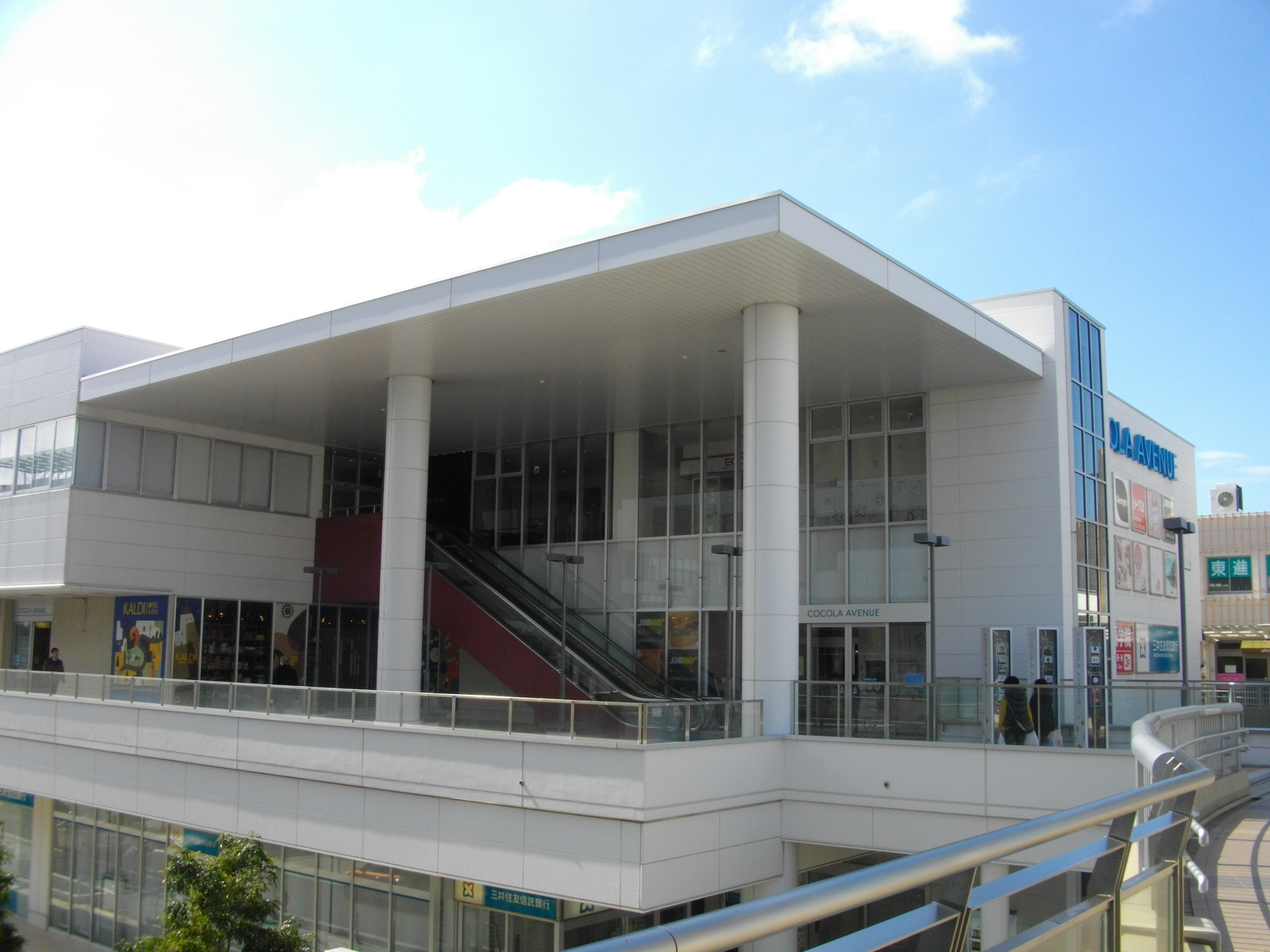
Cocola Avenue

== Media ==
=== Studio ===
- FM Toyohashi (JOZZ6AA-FM, 84.30 MHz)

=== Newspaper ===
- Higashi Aichi Newspaper
- Tonichi Shimbun Newspaper

== Education ==
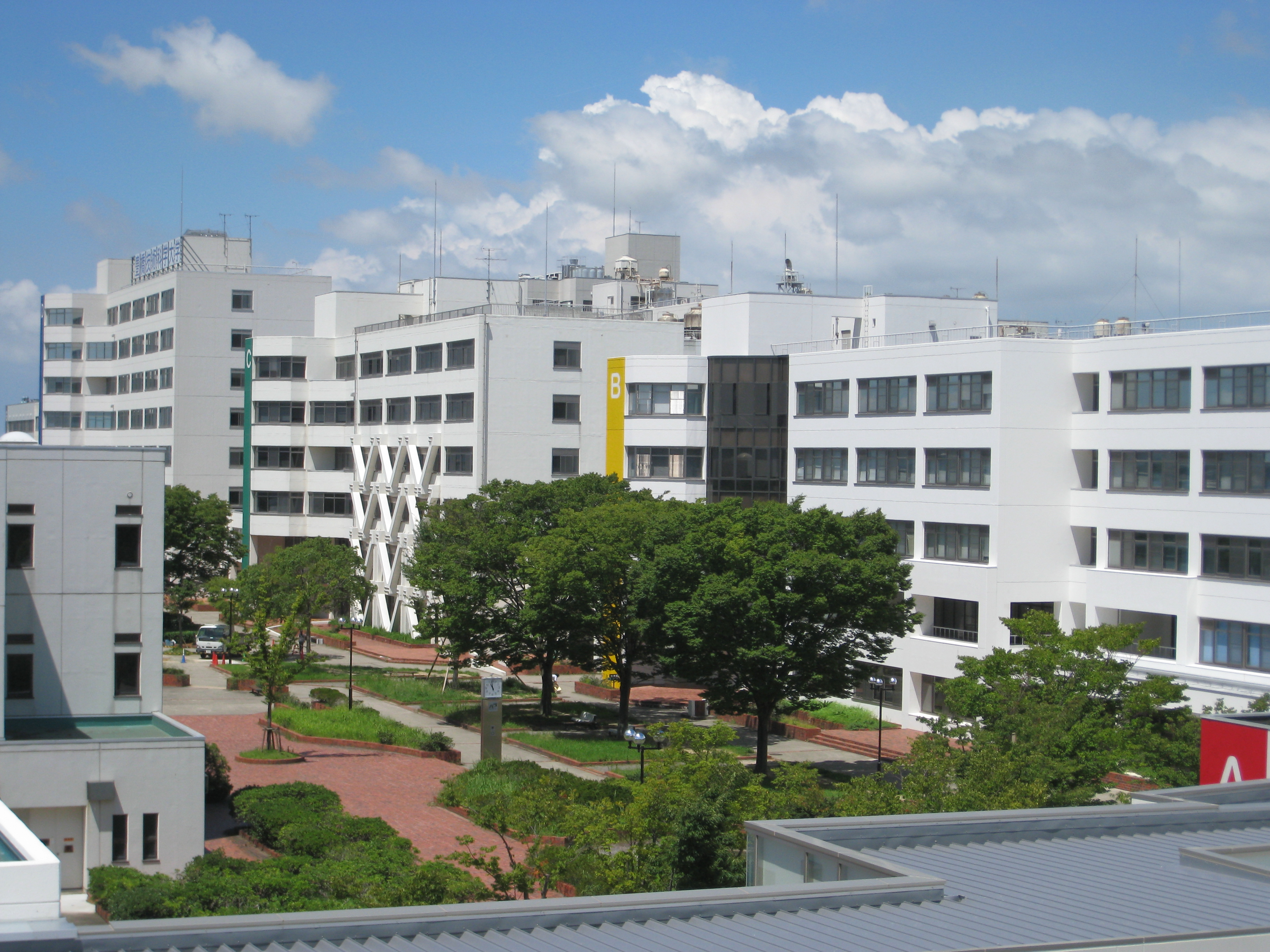
Toyohashi University of Technology

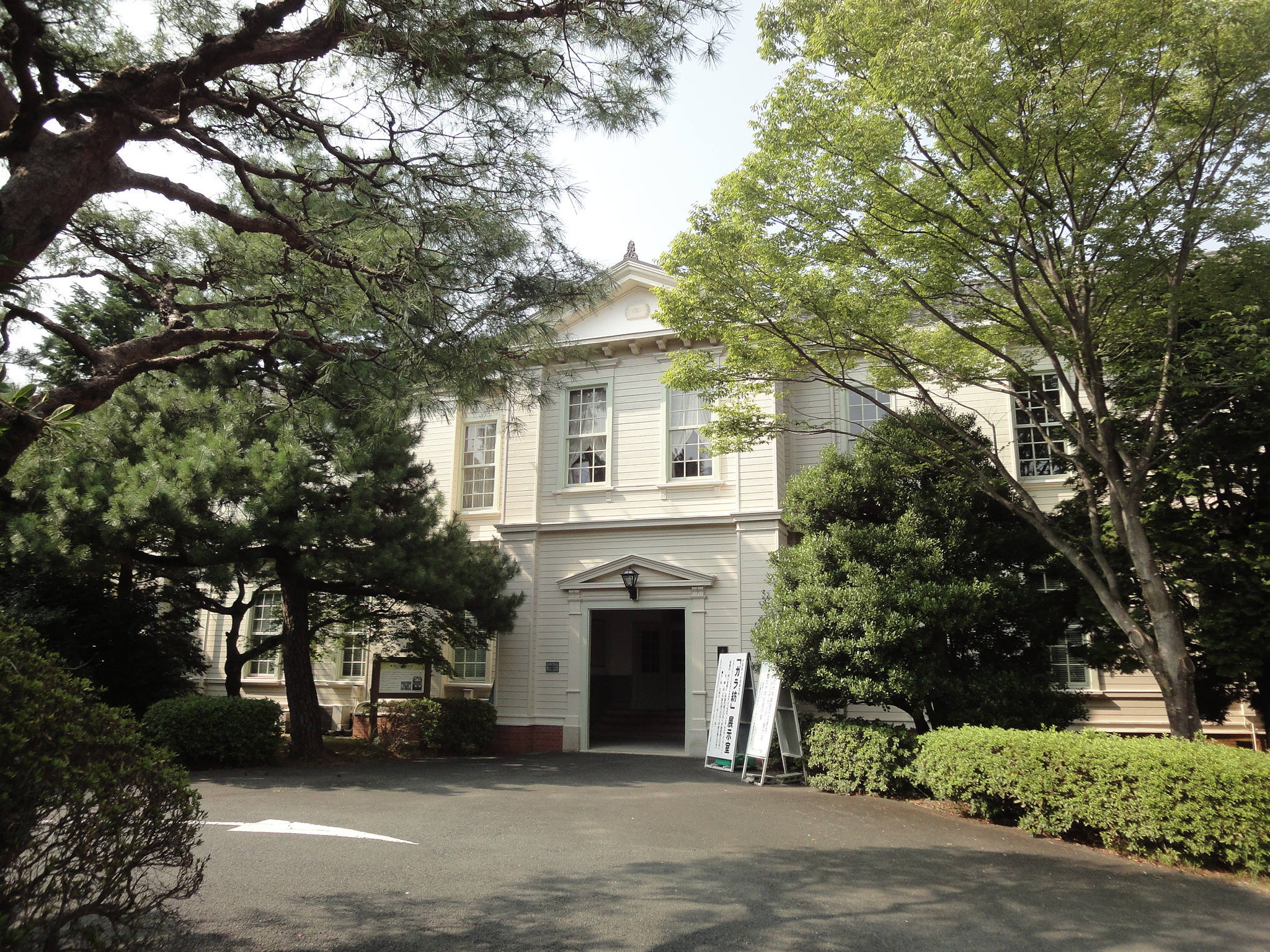
Aichi UniversityToyohashi campuses

=== Universities ===
National university

- Toyohashi University of Technology

Private university

- Aichi University
- Toyohashi Sozo College

Private college

- Aichi Junior College

=== Primary and secondary schools ===
- Toyohashi has 52 public elementary schools and 22 public middle schools operated by the city government, and eight public high schools operated by the Aichi Prefectural Board of Education. The city also has one private middle school and three private high schools. The prefecture also operated three special education schools for the handicapped.

=== International schools ===
- Escola Alegria de Saber (エスコーラ・アレグリア・デ・サベール) - Brazilian school
- Escola Cantinho Brasileiro (カンティーニョ学園) - Brazilian primary school
- EJA Interativo – Educação de Jovens e Adultos - Brazilian institution
- Toyohashi Korean Elementary School and Kindergarten (豊橋朝鮮初級学校) - North Korean school

== Transportation ==
=== Railway ===
Toyohashi Station is on the Tōkaidō Shinkansen and the Tōkaidō Main Line. Hikari shinkansen services stop at Toyohashi Station approximately once every two hours, and Kodama services stop twice an hour. Toyohashi Station is also the terminus of the Iida Line, Meitetsu Nagoya Main Line, Toyohashi Railroad Atsumi Line, and the Toyohashi Railroad Azumada Main Line, making it an important transportation hub.

==== Highspeed rail ====
Central Japan Railway Company

- Tōkaidō Shinkansen: Toyohashi

==== Conventional lines ====
Central Japan Railway Company

- Tōkaidō Main Line: Toyohashi • Futagawa
- Iida Line: Toyohashi • Funamachi • Shimoji

Meitetsu

- Meitetsu Nagoya Line: Toyohashi

Toyotetsu

- Toyohashi Railroad Atsumi Line: Shin-Toyohashi • Yagyu-bashi • Koike • Aichidaigakumae • Minami-Sakae • Takashi • Ashihara • Ueta • Mukougaoka • Ōshimizu • Oitsu • Sugiyama

=== Tramway ===
Toyotetsu

- Toyohashi Railroad Azumada Main Line: Ekimae • Ekimae-ōdōri • Shinkawa • Fudagi • Shiyakushomae • Toyohashi-kōenmae • Higashi-hatchō • Maehata • Azumada-sakaue • Azumada • Keirinjōmae • Ihara • Akaiwaguchi
- Ihara • Undōkōen-mae

=== Bus ===
Almost all services are operated by Toyotetsu Bus, a subsidiary of Toyohashi Railroad.

=== Air ===
The nearest airport is Chubu Centrair International Airport, located 92 km (57 mi) north west of Toyohashi.

=== Roads ===
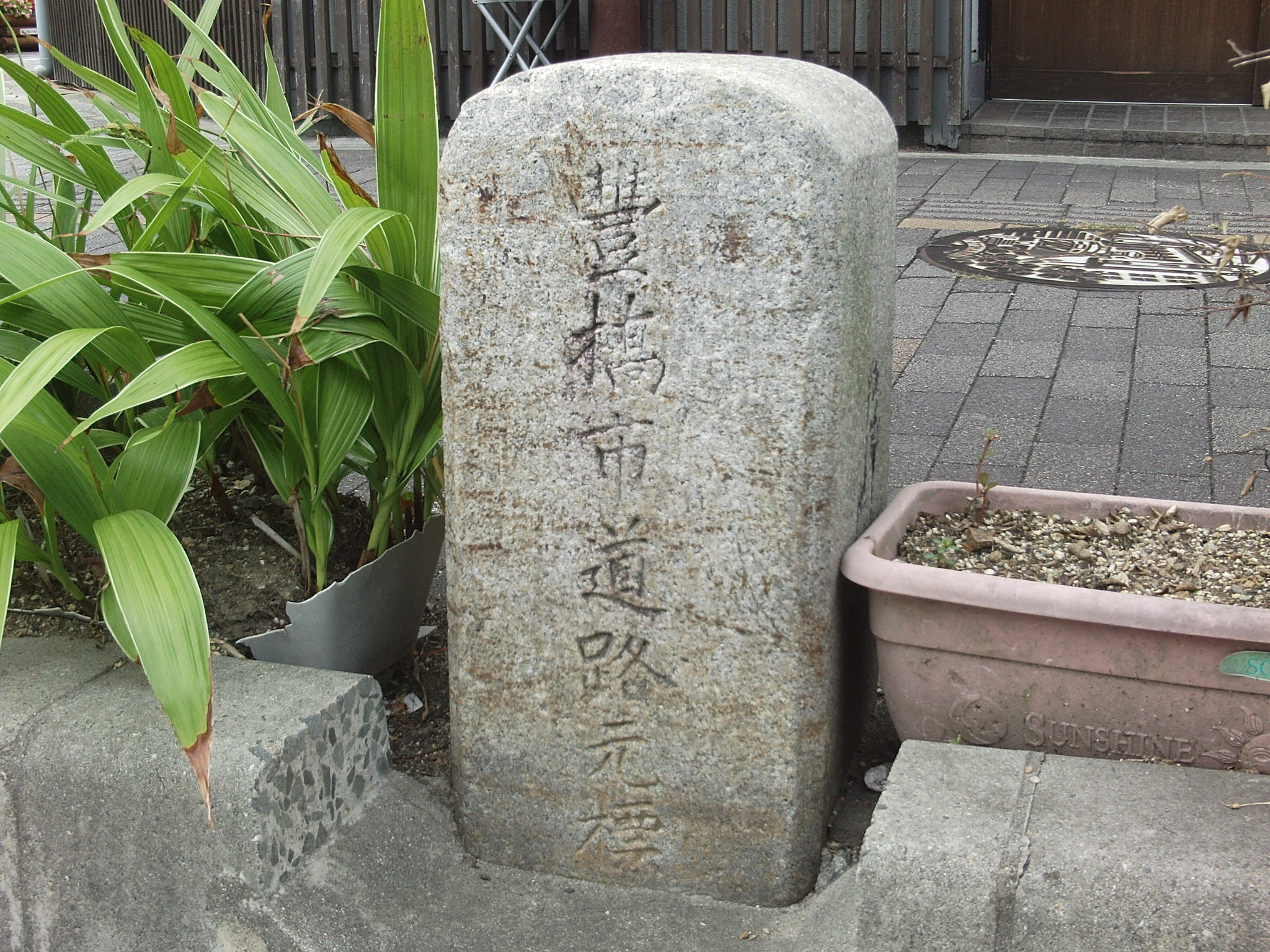
The Kilometre Zero of Toyohashi

==== Highway ====
- Tomei Expressway

==== Japan National Route ====
- National Route 1
- National Route 23
- National Route 42
- National Route 151
- National Route 259
- National Route 362

=== Sea port ===
- Port of Toyohashi (Port of Mikawa)
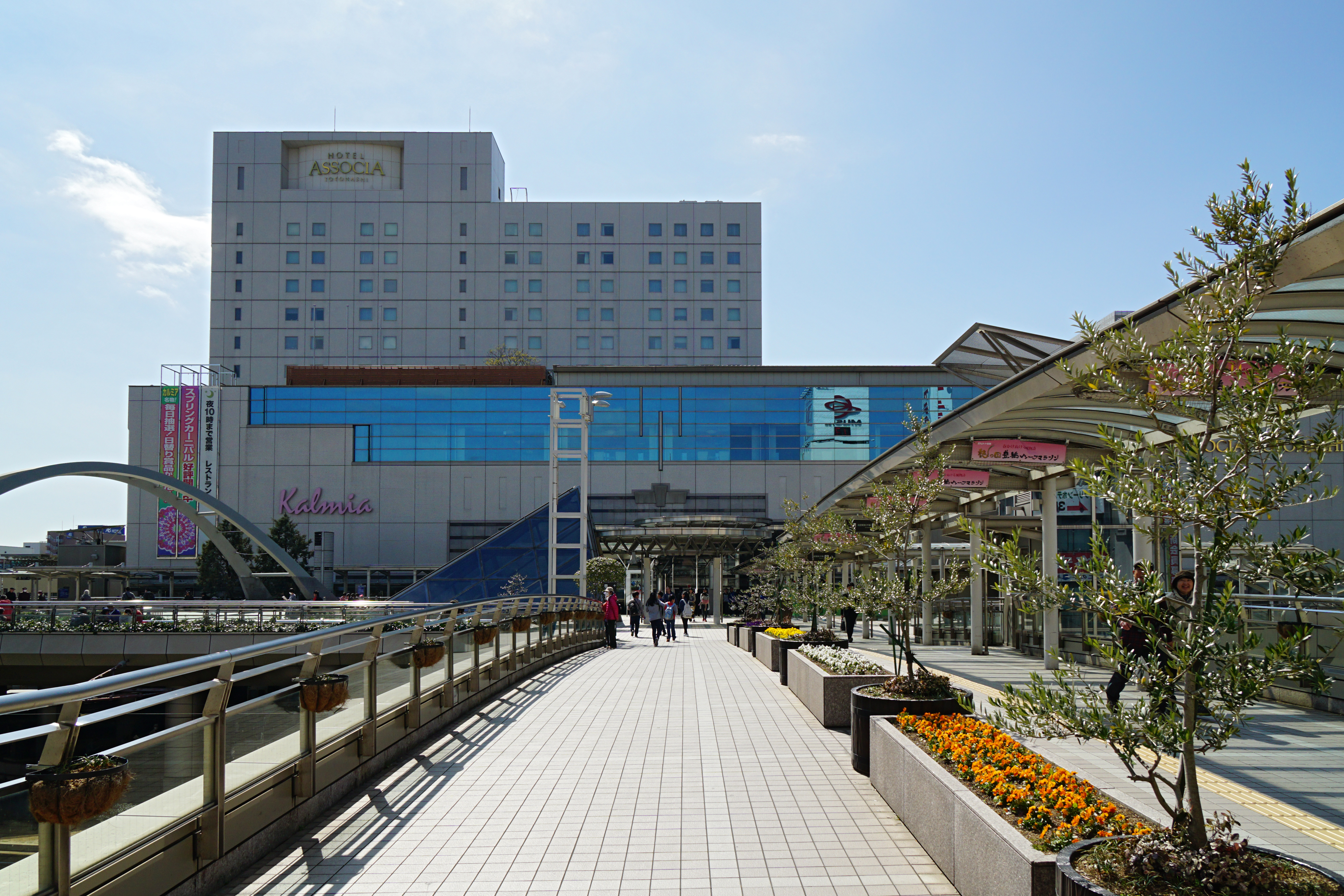
Toyohashi Station

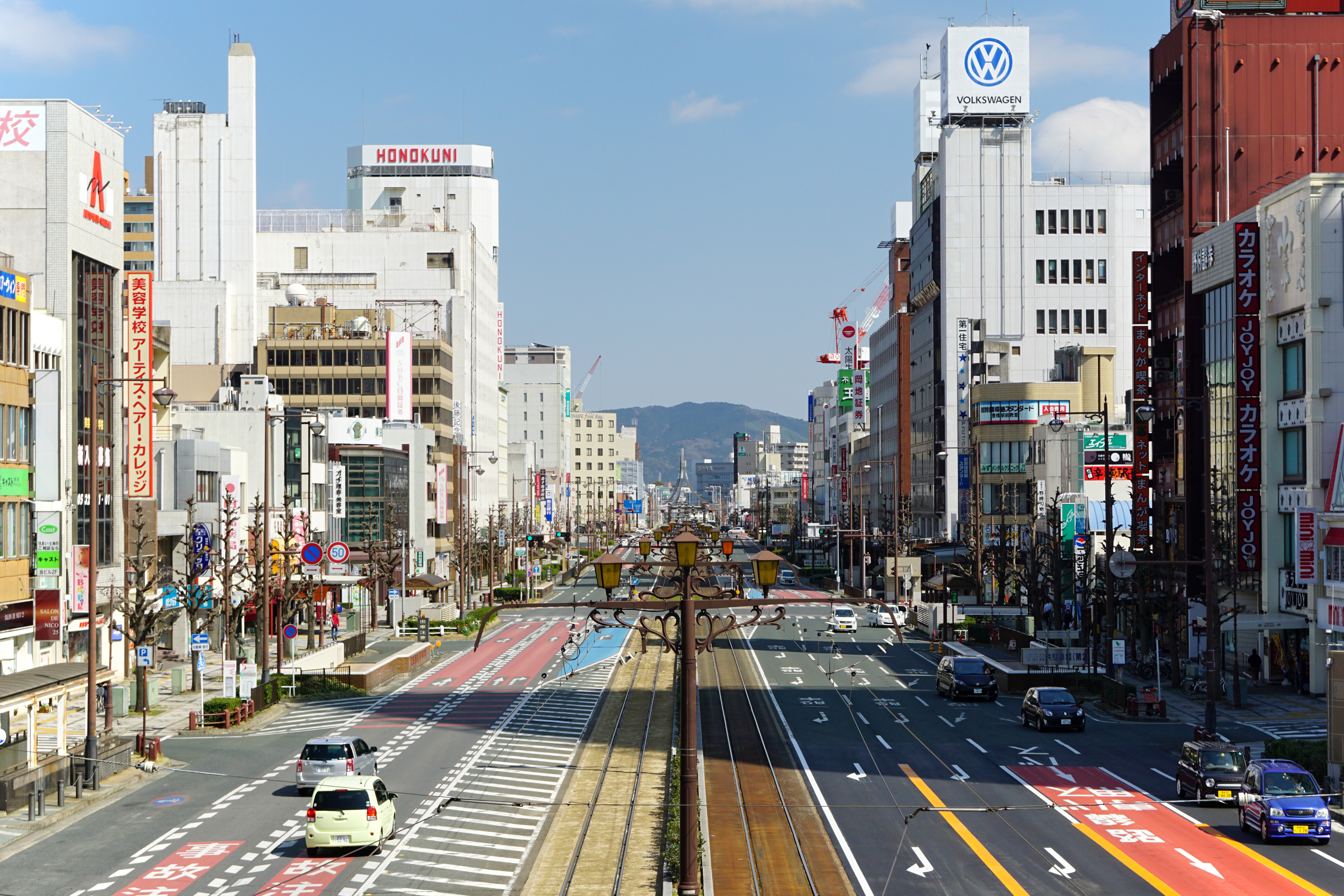
Ekimae-Ôdôri Main street

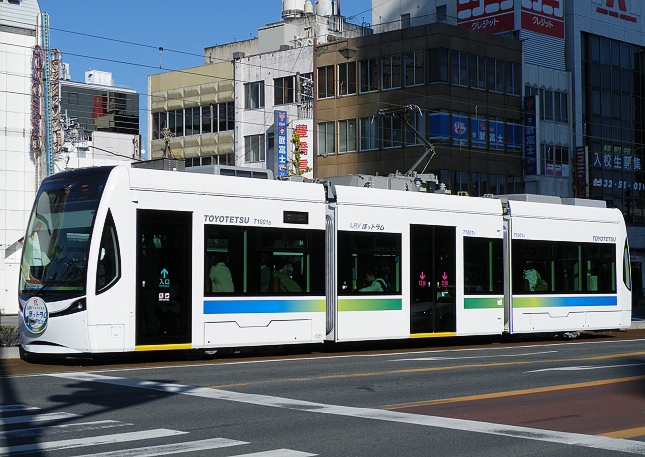
Toyohashi Railroad

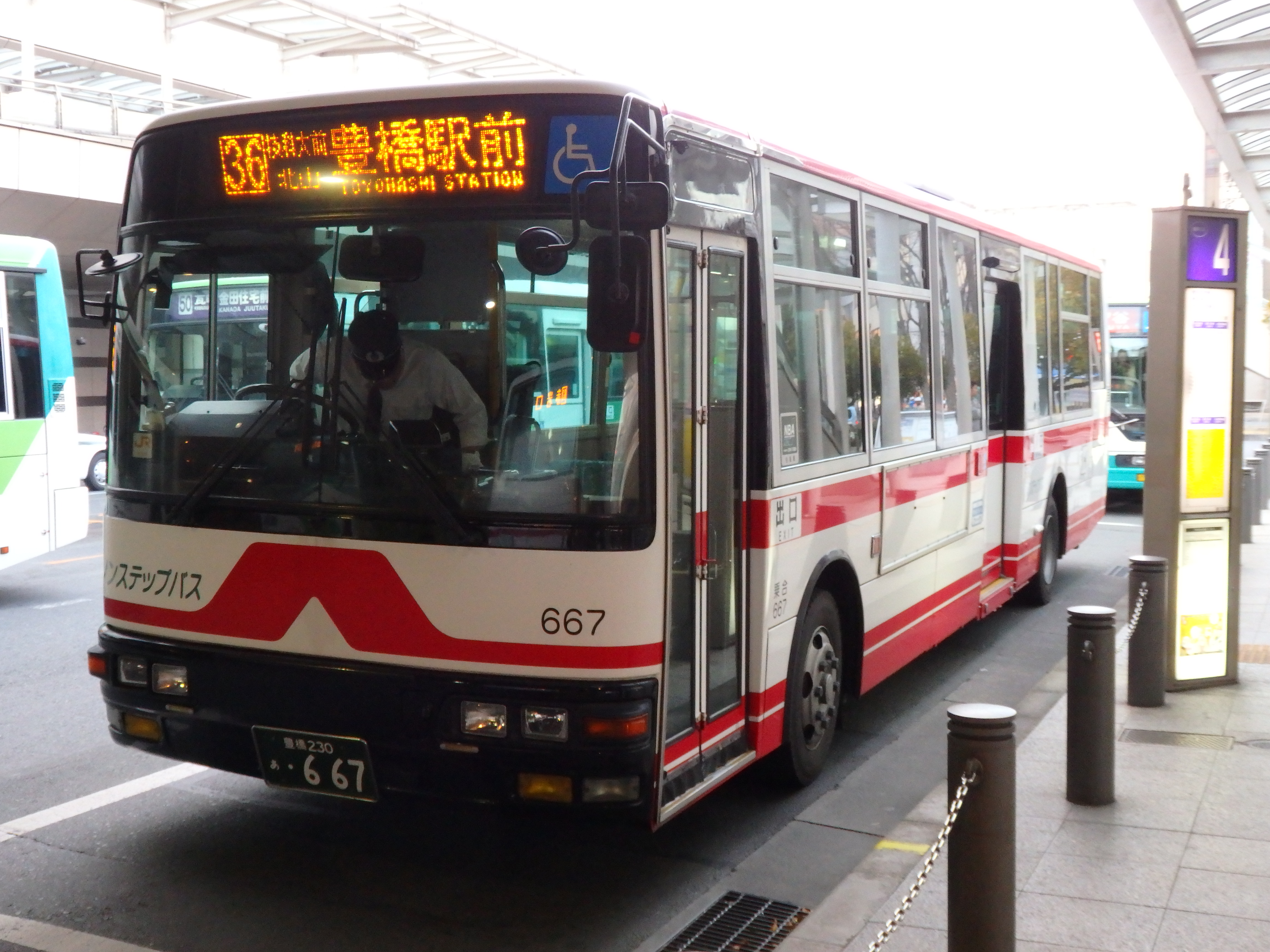
Toyotetsu Bus

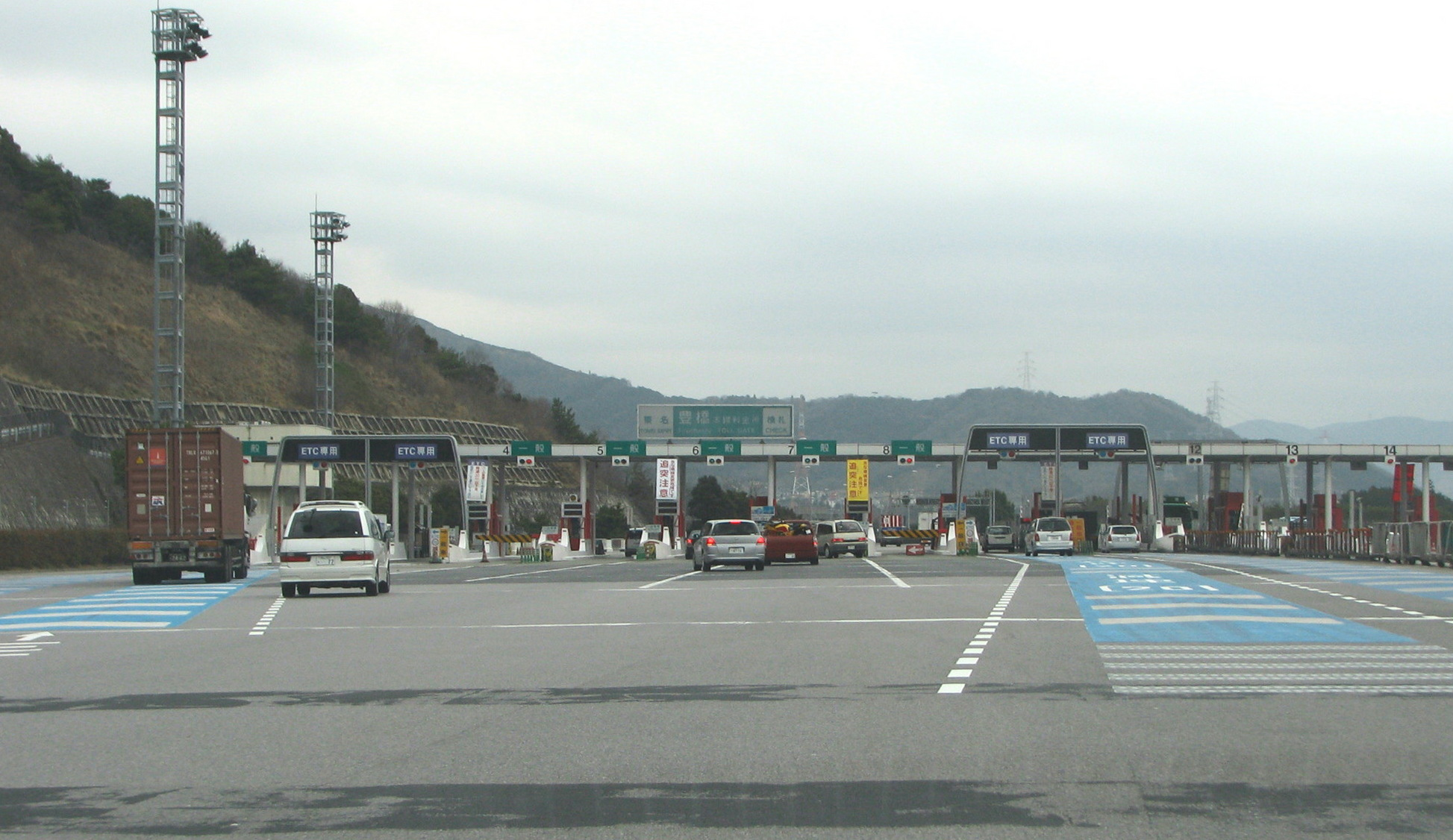
Toyohashi Tollgate

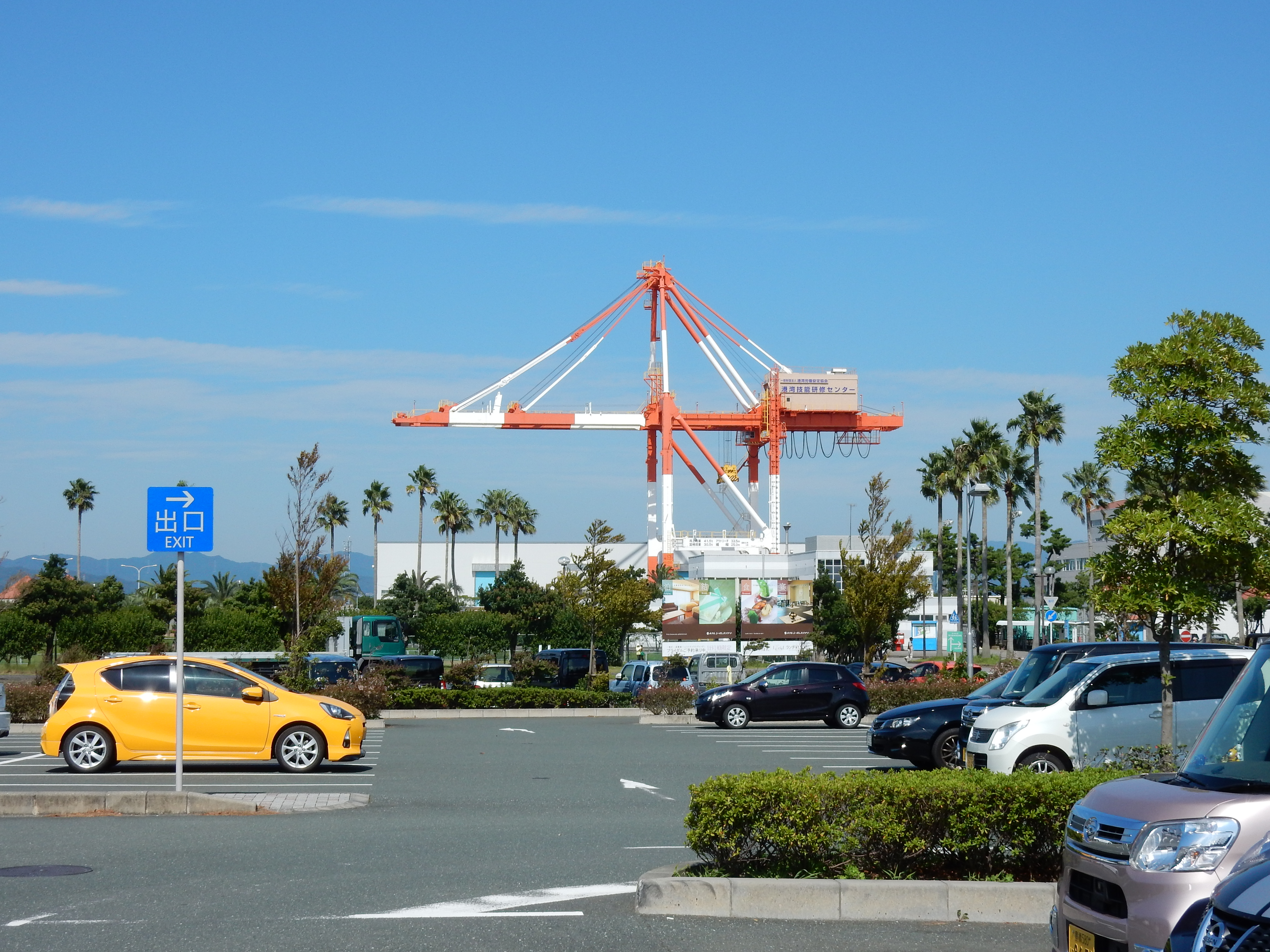
Port of Toyohashi

== Local attractions ==
=== Places of interest ===
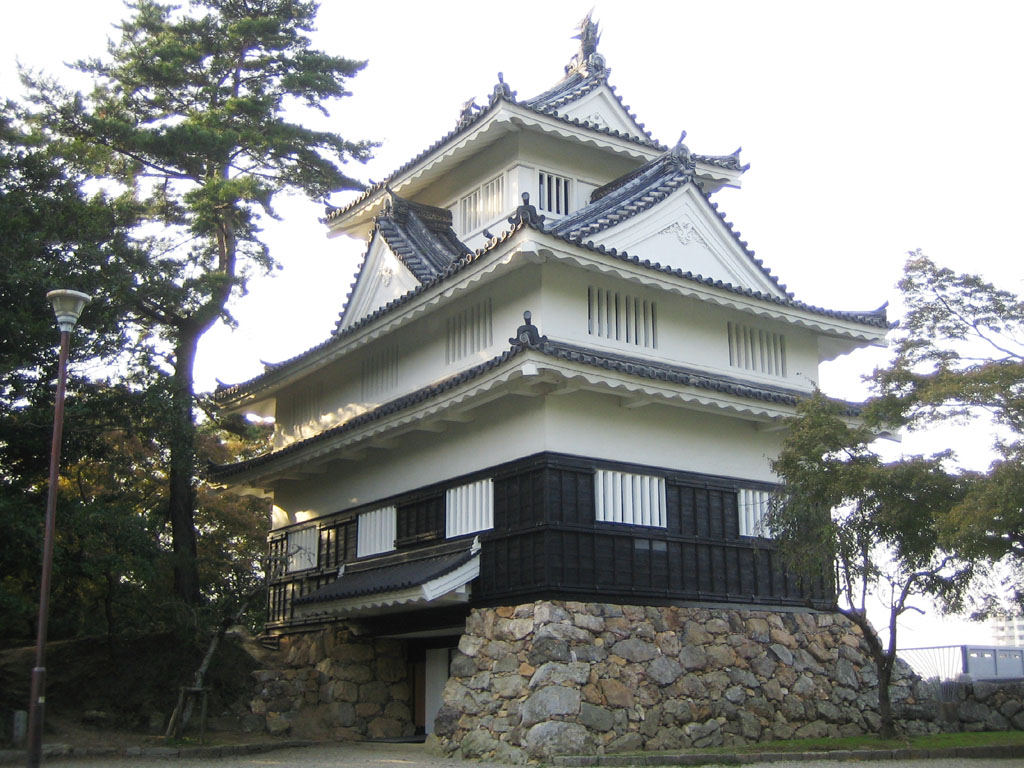
Yoshida Castle

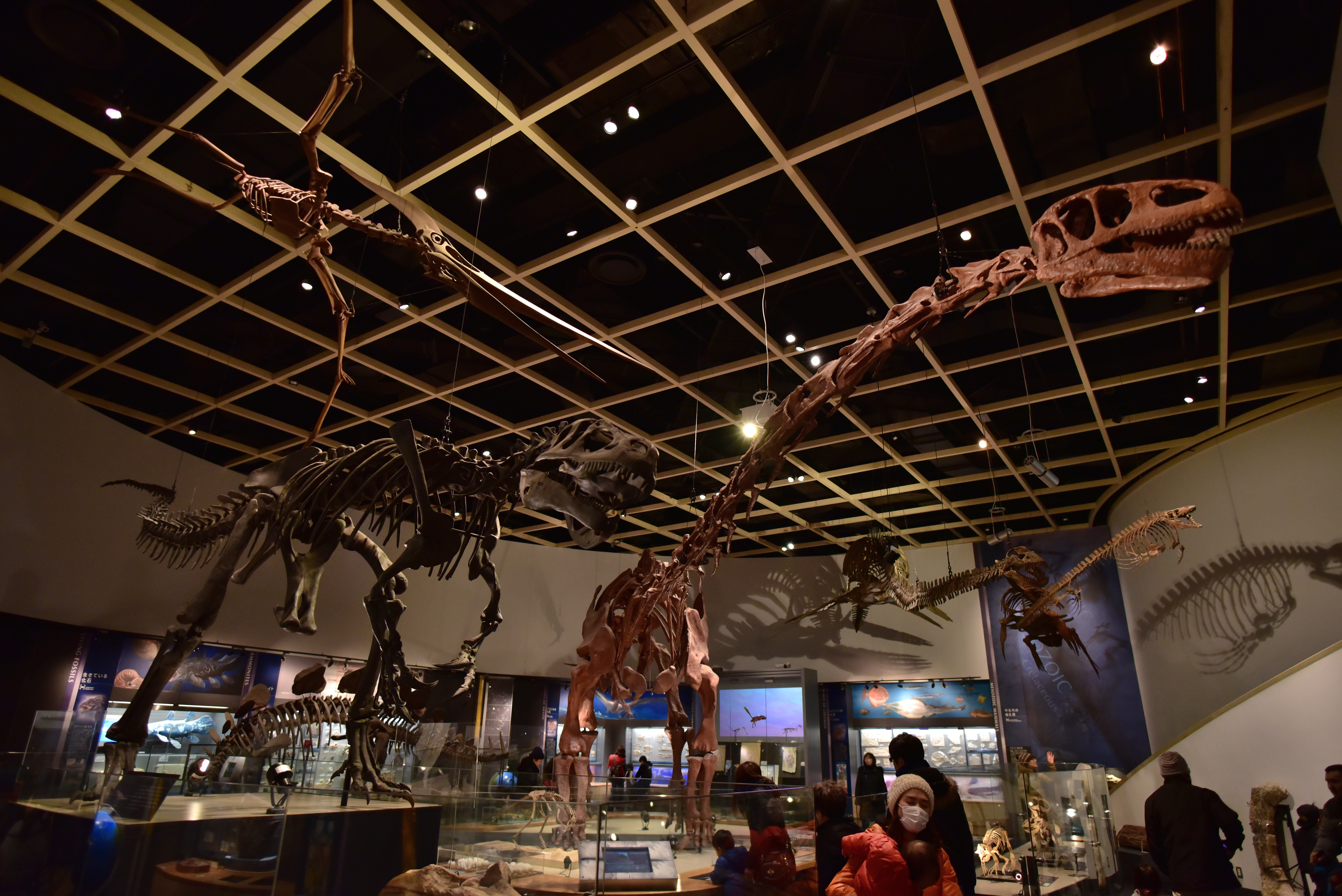
Toyohashi Natural History Museum

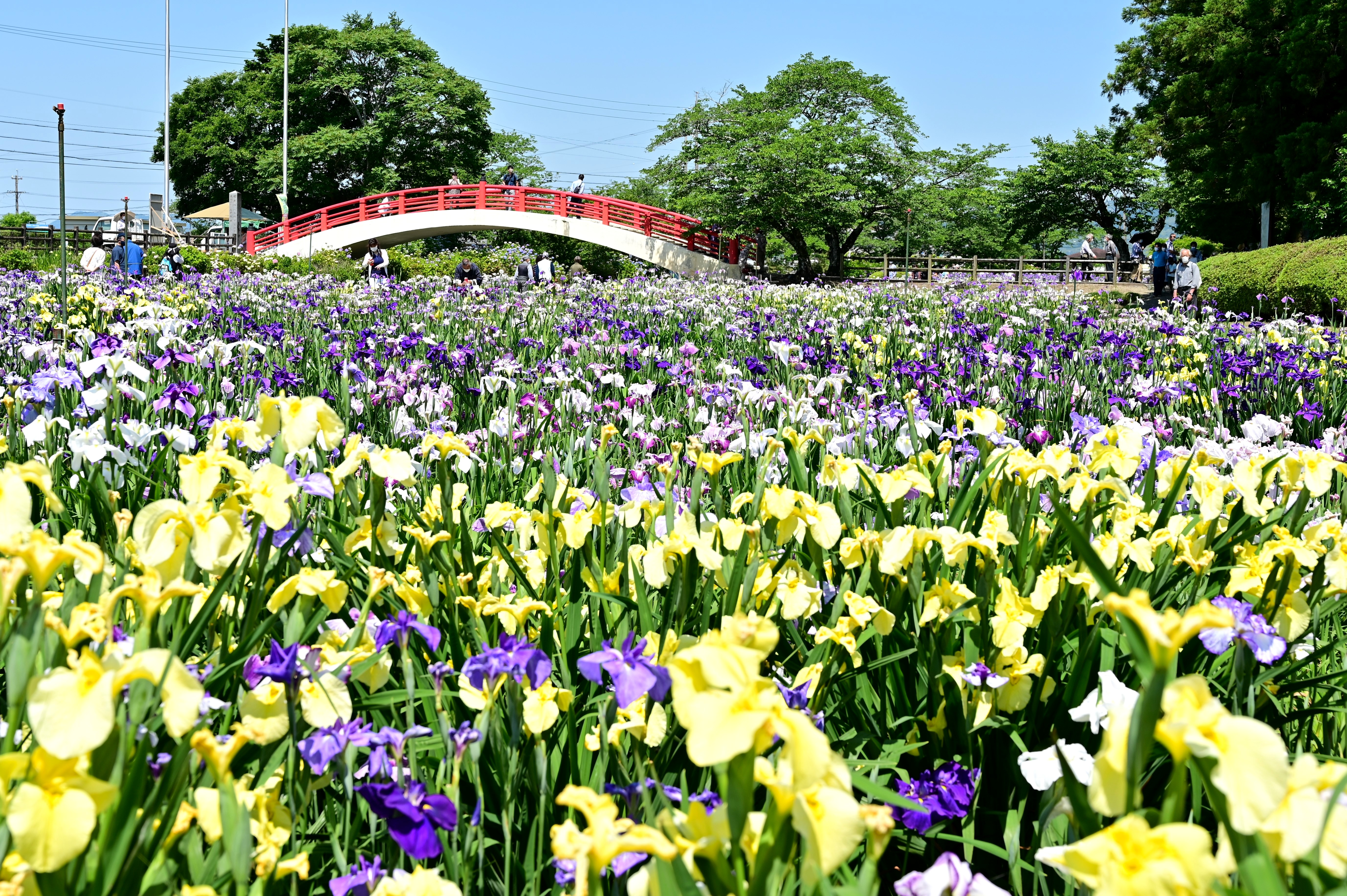
Kamo Iris Garden

- Toyohashi Park, which includes the site of Yoshida Castle (吉田城址), and the Toyohashi City Museum Art and History.
- Site of Nirengi Castle
- Toyohashi City Public Hall (豊橋市公会堂, Toyohashi-shi Kōkaidō), a National Important Cultural Property .
- Toyohashi Orthodox Cathedral (豊橋ハリストス正教会), a National Important Cultural Property
- Futagawa-juku honjin museum
- Toyohashi Zoo
- Toyohashi Natural History Museum
- Toyohashi Museum of Natural Resources

=== Facilities and parks ===
Toyohashi has many parks, including the Natural History Museum and Zoological Park, the Imou swamp, Mikawa Seaside Forest, Kamo Iris Garden, and the Mukaiyama Ume Garden. It also has what is considered one of the best surfing beaches in Aichi and the surrounding region.

== Culture ==
=== Festivals ===
Toyohashi Festival, Spring Festival, Iris Flower Festival, Gion Festival, Demon Festival (February), and traditional marionette performances (Akumi joruri). At some of these festivals, especially the summer festivals, the use of traditionally handcrafted fireworks is showcased, and include hand-held bamboo-tube fireworks known as tezutsu hanabi.

=== Special products ===
Chikuwa (a type of baked sausage roll made from fish), Gohei rice cake (五平餅, Gohei-mochi), beach fermented soybeans, food boiled in goby fish and soy, top producer of quail eggs in Japan, Toyohashi calligraphy brush (豊橋筆, Toyohashi-fude).

=== In popular culture ===
In the fictional Harry Potter universe, Toyohashi is the hometown of the professional Quidditch team, the Toyohashi Tengu.

In the Takeshi Kitano movie Kikujiro, the story revolves around the characters' trip from Tokyo to Toyohashi.

Toyohashi is the setting of the light novel series Makeine: Too Many Losing Heroines!, the anime television adaptation of which premiered in July 2024.

=== Sports ===
==== Basketball ====
- San-en NeoPhoenix (Toyohashi City General Gymnasium)

==== Baseball ====
- Chunichi Dragons (Toyohashi Municipal Baseball Stadium)

== Gallery ==
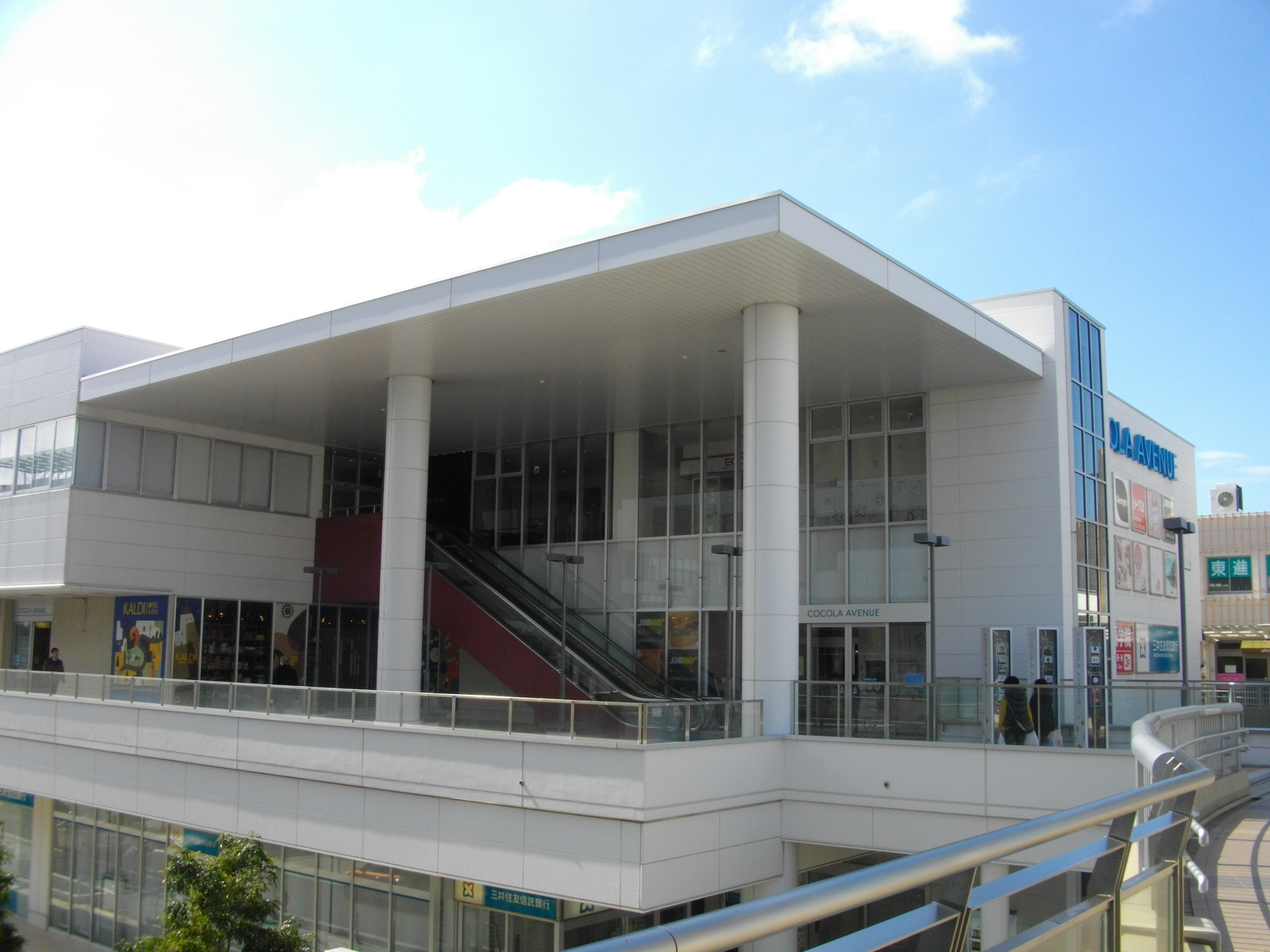
Cocola Avenue

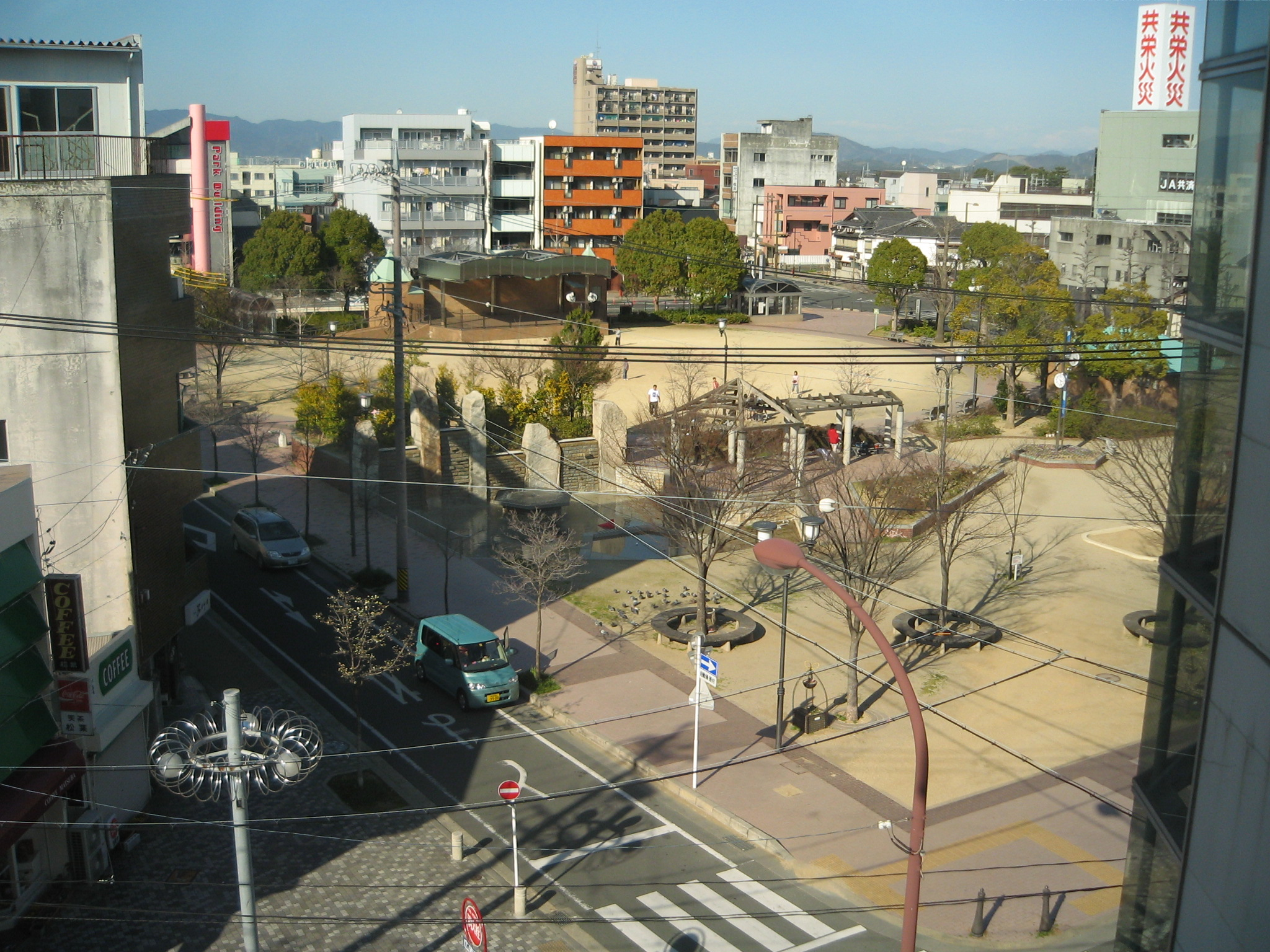
Matsuba Park

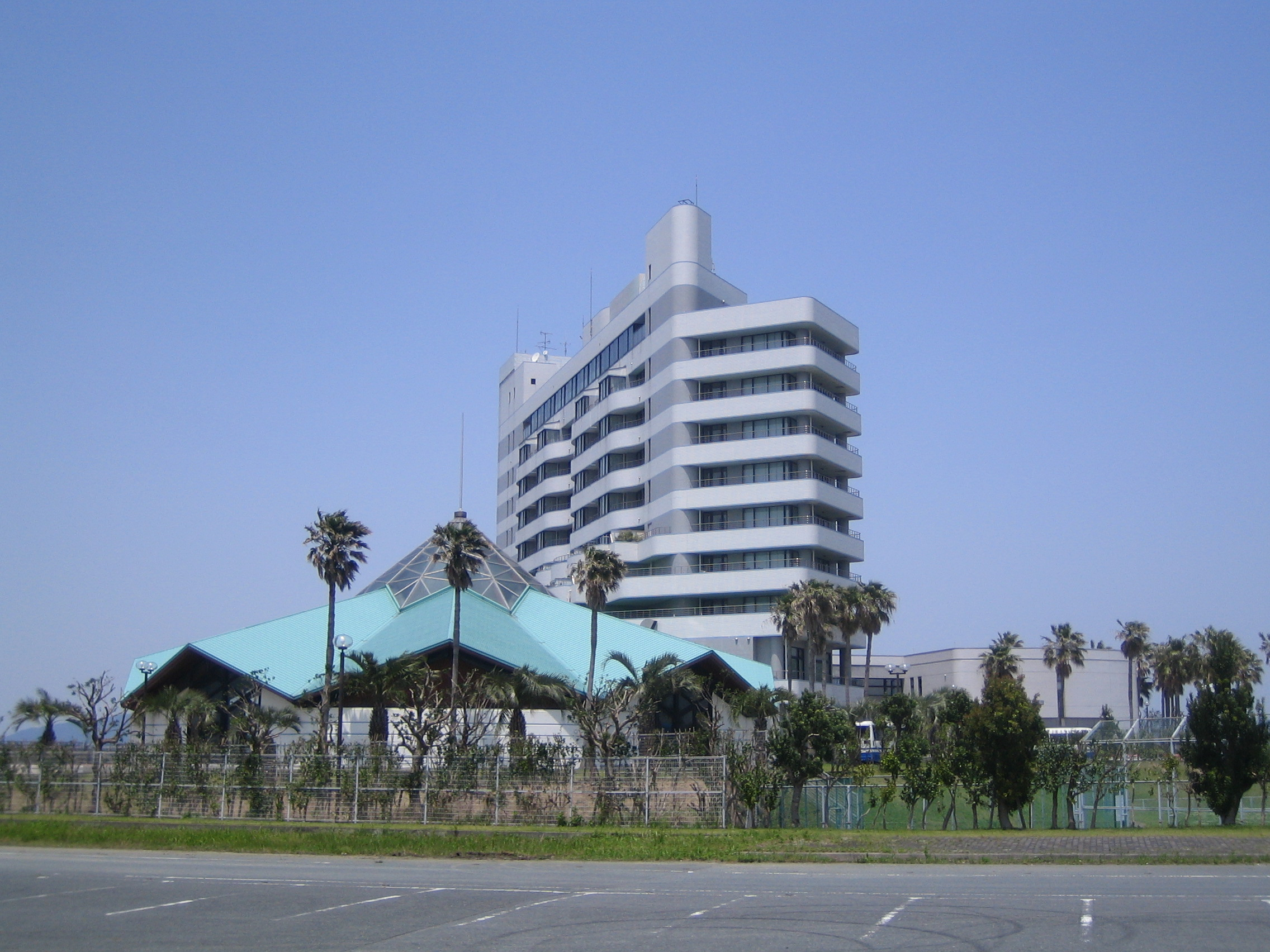
Seapalace Resort

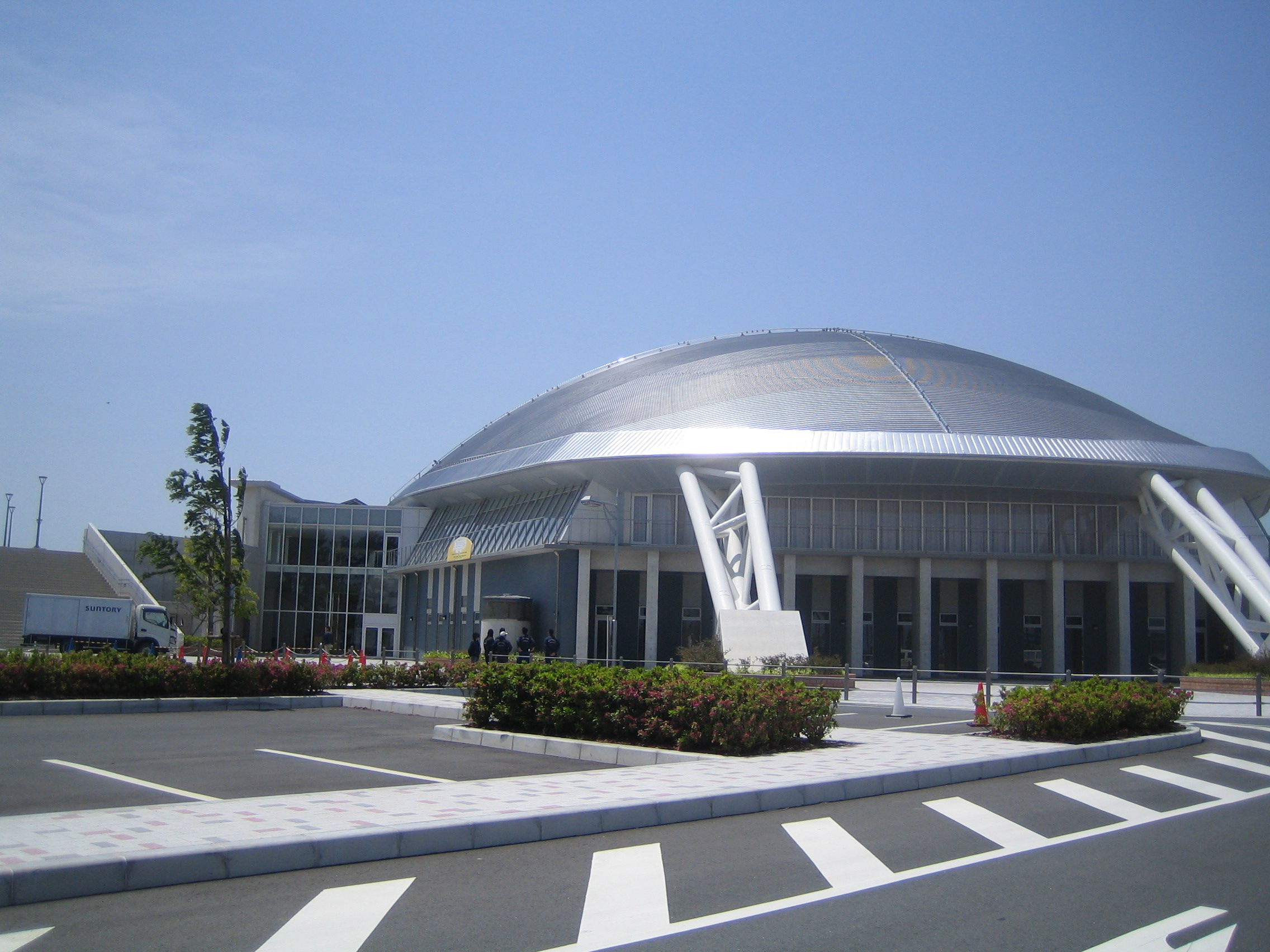
Aquarena Toyohashi

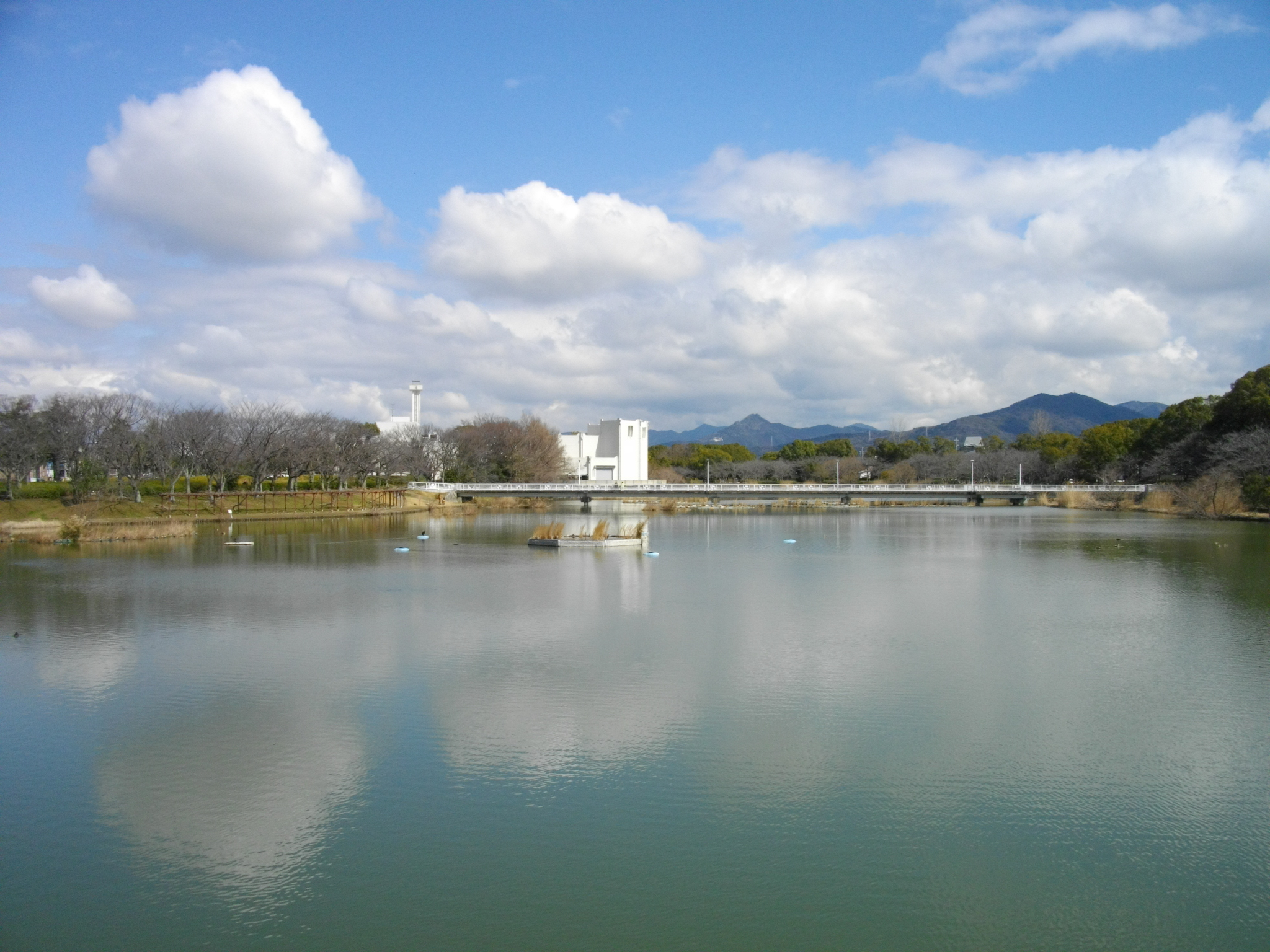
Mukaiyama-Oike Ponds

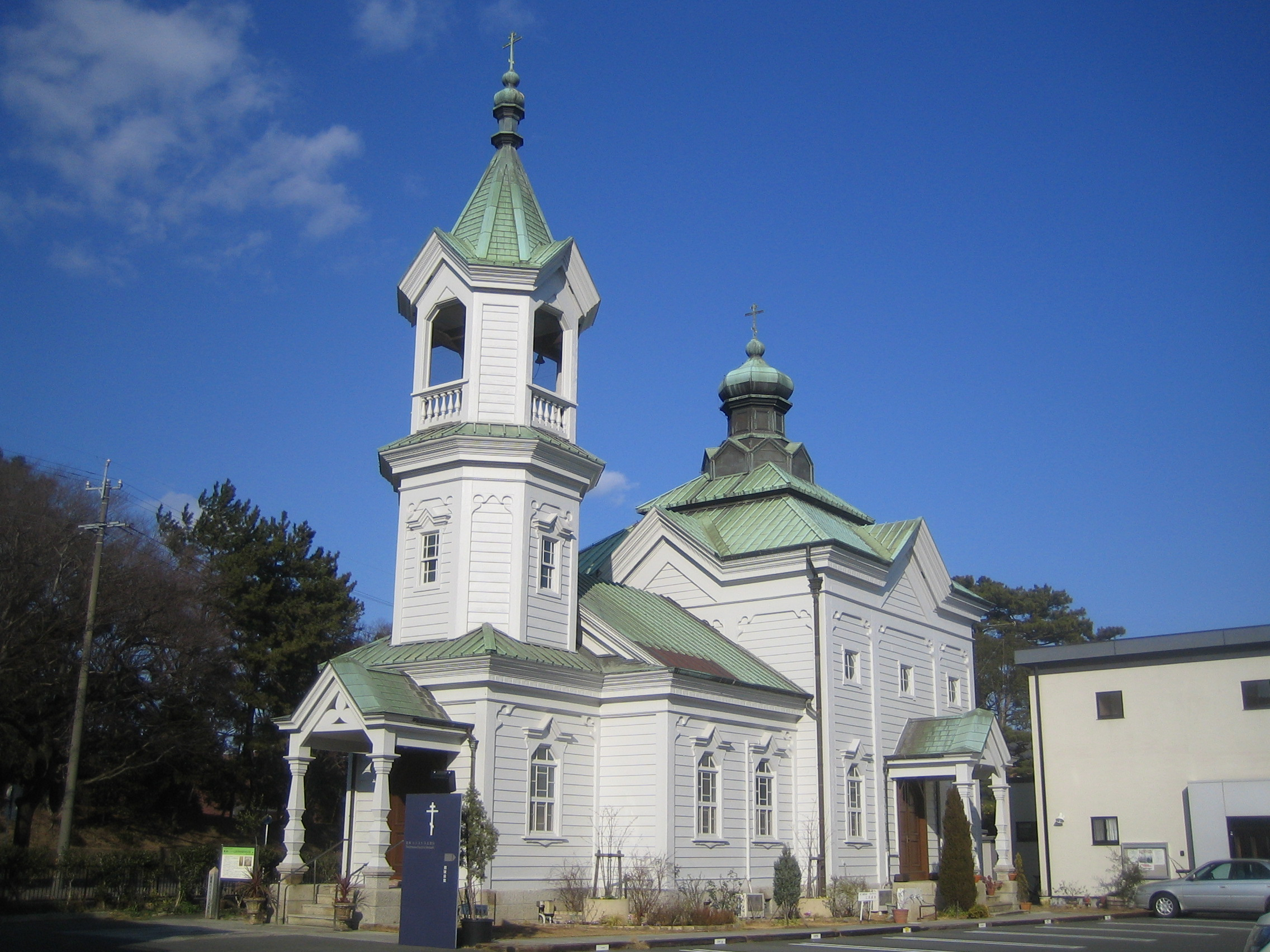
Toyohashi Orthodox Church

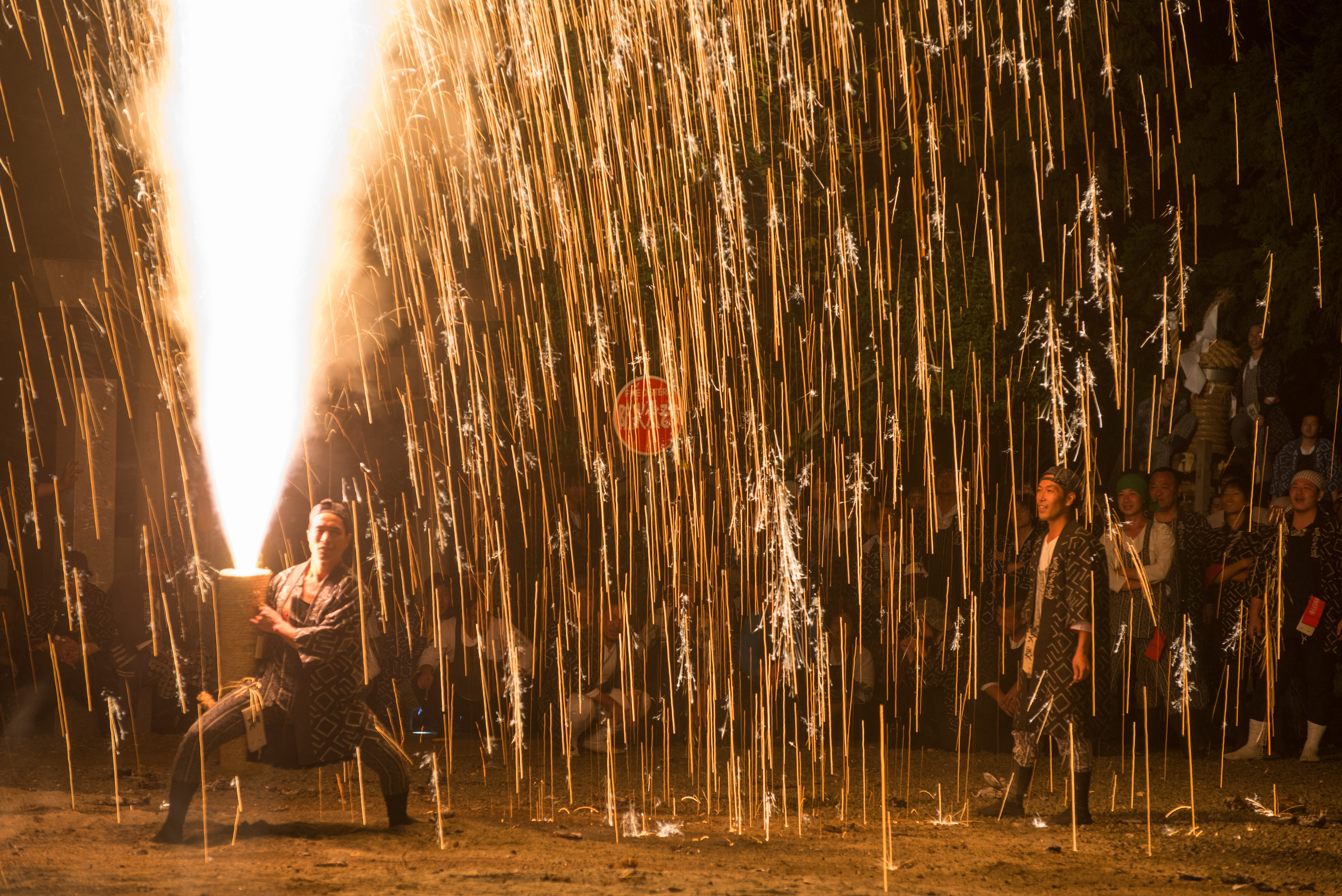
Tezutsu Fireworks

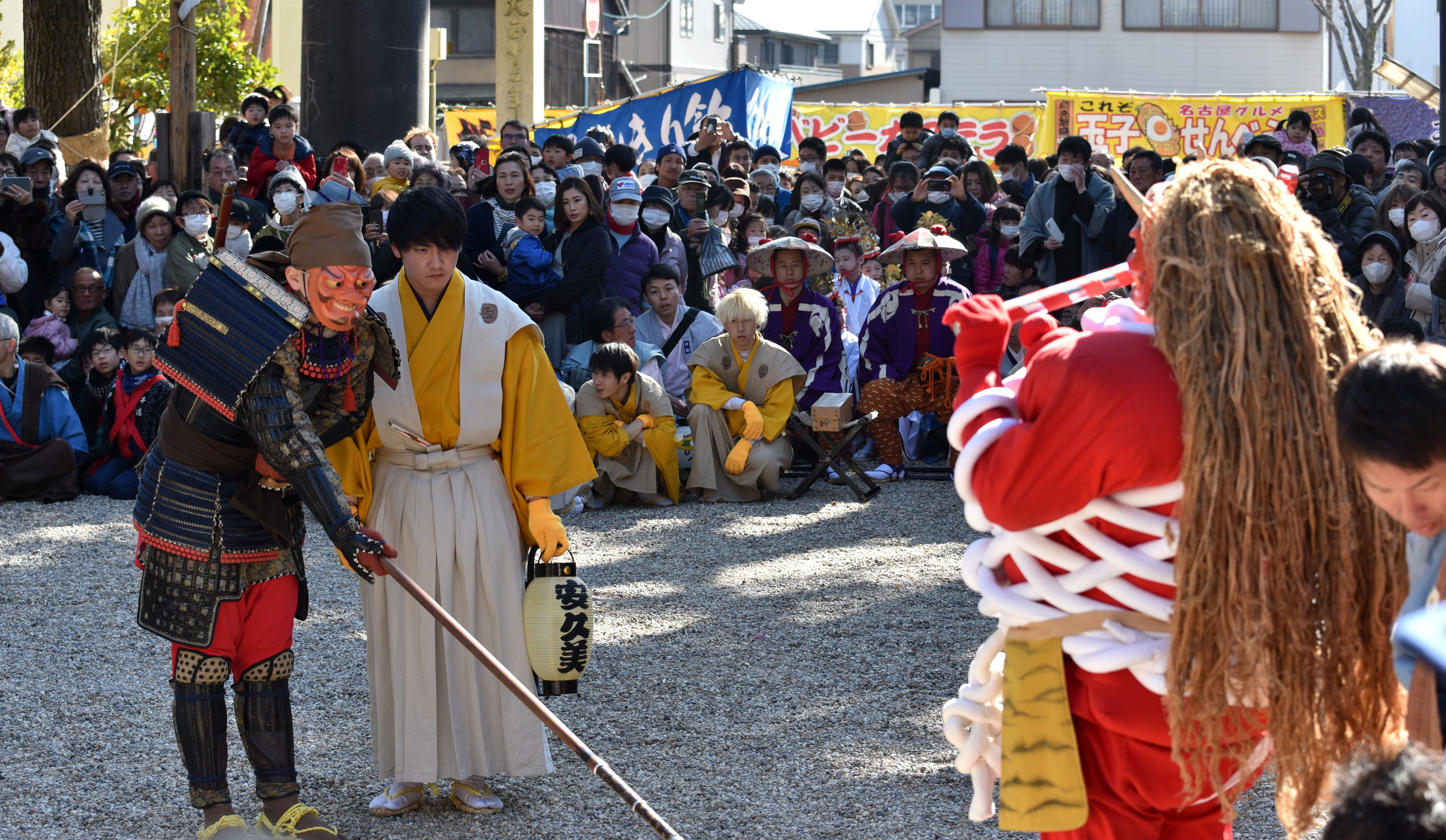
Toyohashi Oni Festival

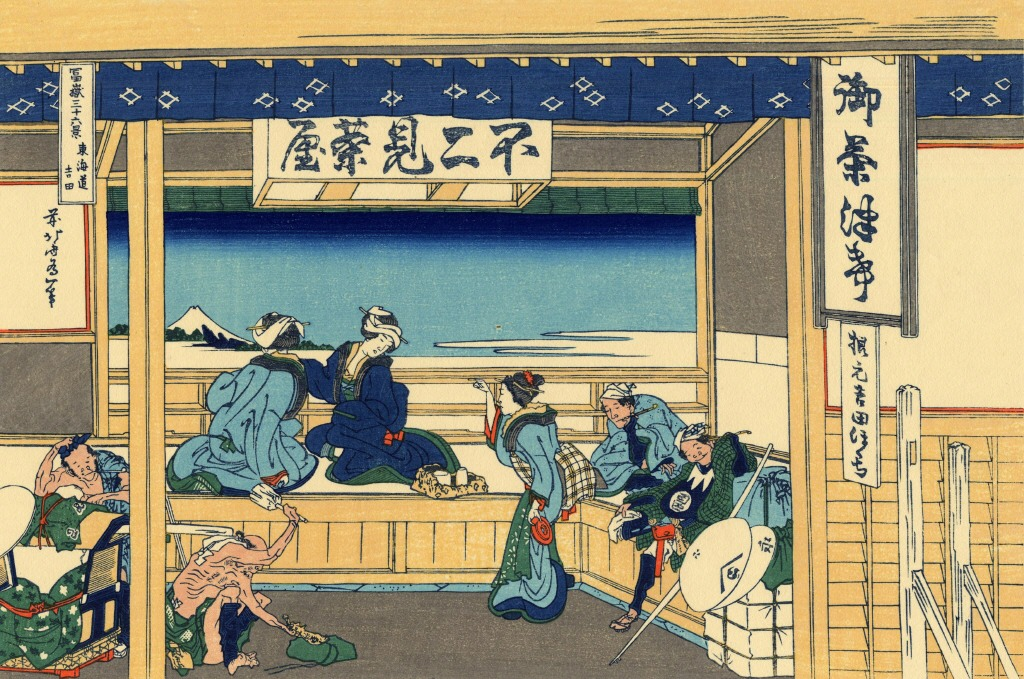
Hokusai

== Notable people from Toyohashi ==
- Yua Aida, AV idol and model
- Katsuhito Asano, Japanese politician
- Daniel (Nushiro) of Japan, primate of Japanese Orthodox Church
- Atsushi Fujii, professional baseball player
- Emi Fujino, mixed martial artist, kickboxer and professional wrestler
- Mizuki Inoue, kickboxer and mixed martial artist
- Yoshitaka Iwamizu, Olympic long-distance runner
- Kitaro, musician
- Aya Kitō, writer
- Masaji Kiyokawa, Olympic gold-medalist swimmer
- Masatoshi Koshiba, Nobel Prize winner
- Sayaka Kurara, is a Japanese professional wrestler
- Ken Matsudaira, actor
- Rena Matsui, actress, former member of SKE48
- Yūji Mitsuya, actor, voice actor
- Nashiko Momotsuki, cosplayer, actress, Toyohashi tourism ambassador
- Masahiko Morifuku, professional baseball player
- Sakura Nogawa, voice actress
- Kenichi Ogawa, boxer
- Yoshio Sawai, manga artist
- Akiko Suzuki, professional figure skater
- Buyūzan Takeyoshi, sumo wrestler
- Sakon Yamamoto, professional race car driver
- Takibi Amamori, novelist

== See also ==
- 18th Infantry Regiment (Imperial Japanese Army)
- Black Thunder (chocolate bar)
- Nirengi Castle
- Nishikawa Castle
- Siege of Yoshida Castle
- Toyohashi Air Raid
- Toyokawa Bridge
