= 2025 Emperor's Cup prefectural qualifiers =

Tournament details
- Country: Japan
- Teams: 500+

The 2025 Emperor's Cup prefectural qualifiers is a series of tournaments with each prefectural champion being granted qualification for the 2025 Emperor's Cup, the main football cup competition in Japan. It is the 29th time that lower ranking teams qualify for the Emperor's Cup via prefectural tournaments, as before the 1996 Emperor's Cup, the lower ranked teams in the competition qualified via regional qualification.

J1 League and J2 League clubs did not participate in the prefectural tournaments, as those clubs are automatically qualified for the Cup.

Usually, the format of the Emperor's Cup opens 48 berths for amateur clubs, with all of them being assigned into the first round of the competition. Alongside the 47 prefectural champions, the JFA annually assigns a specially designated club to complete the roster of 48 amateur teams into the round. The specially designated clubs automatically skip the qualification stage and then, does not participate in their respective prefectural tournaments. On 2025, Toyo University was benefited from it and skipped the Tokyo Metropolitan Qualifying Tournament.

Customarily, university teams are allowed to participate in each tournament. Some university clubs have two or more affiliated teams participating, with its second-and-beyond teams composed of present and past students in that university. The first-team of each universities uses its formal and original name to distinguish themselves from its affiliated teams, which is most of the time done by attaching abbreviations (such as "FC", "AFC" or "SC") to the names of their respective universities.

== Prefectural tournaments ==
Teams playing in higher tiers usually receive a bye from the early stages of each tournament, with some automatically seeded to the prefectural final. This is the case with many J3 League teams, as the only professional clubs eligible to participate. Some prefectures holds qualification to their prefectural tournaments, splitting "social representatives" and "university representatives" into the qualifiers. This is more prone to occur when two or more clubs from the same prefecture are members of the J3 League and/or Japan Football League, as both leagues' clubs are exempt from being treated as a "social representative", a term which describes amateur clubs whose players are, or were affiliated unanimously, with the same university.

The boxes for each prefectural tournament below only shows matches of each prefecture's final tournament, omitting the preliminary rounds.

=== Hokkaido ===
10 May Semi-finals	Hokkaido Tokachi Sky Earth	3–0	Hokkaido UE Iwamizawa

10 May Semi-finals	BTOP Hokkaido	1–0	Sapporo University

11 May Final	Hokkaido Tokachi Sky Earth	1–2	BTOP Hokkaido

=== Aomori ===
9 March 1st round	Bogolle D. Tsugaru	5–1	Oirase FC

16 March 1st round	Shichinohe SC	0–2	Blancdieu Hirosaki FC

16 March 2nd round	Bogolle D. Tsugaru	0–2	Hachinohe Gakuin University

23 March 3rd round	Hachinohe Gakuin University	2–2 (5–4 p)	Blancdieu Hirosaki FC

27 April 4th round	ReinMeer Aomori	2–1	Hachinohe Gakuin University

11 May Final	Vanraure Hachinohe	0–0 (5–6 p)	ReinMeer Aomori

=== Iwate ===
9 March 1st round	Tono SC	0–3	Oshu United FC

16 March 2nd round	Ganju Iwate	7–0	Nippon Steel Kamaishi

9 March 1st round	Iwate University	10–1	Hanamaki Club

16 March 2nd round	Fuji Club	6–1	Oshu United FC

23 March 3rd round	Ganju Iwate	4–1	Iwate University

23 March 3rd round	Fuji Club	0–0 (4–5 p)	Fuji University

27 April 4th round	Ganju Iwate	1–3	Fuji University

11 May Final	Iwate Grulla Morioka	2–1	Fuji University

=== Akita ===
6 April 1st round	Akita University	0–0 (5–6 p)	Resaca Nishime

6 April 1st round	TDK Shinwakai	4–2	Akita FC Cambiare

13 April Semi-finals	Saruta Kogyo	0–1	Resaca Nishime

13 April Semi-finals	TDK Shinwakai	0–3	North Asia University

20 April Final	Resaca Nishime	0–2	North Asia University

=== Miyagi ===
24 November 2024 1st round	Sendai Sasuke FC	3–1	SSC

24 November 2024 2nd round	RICOH Industries Tohoku	2–1	Hitome Senbonzakura feat. SUFT

9 March 2025 2nd round	Sendai Sasuke FC	0–0 (8–9 p)	Tohoku University

10 November 2024 2nd round	Tohoku Gakuin University	0–2	Shichigahama SC

10 November 2024 2nd round	Miyagi University of Education	1–5	Michinoku Sendai FC

16 March 2025 3rd round	RICOH Industries Tohoku	0–4	Tohoku University

8 December 2024 3rd round	Shichigahama SC	1–5	Michinoku Sendai FC

27 April Semi-finals	Cobaltore Onagawa	3–0	Tohoku University

27 April Semi-finals	Michinoku Sendai FC	0–3	Sendai University

11 May Final	Cobaltore Onagawa	1–3	Sendai University

=== Yamagata ===
9 March 1st round	Kanai SC	1–0	Mikawa SC

16 March 1st round	Tohoku University CSS	1–2	Yamagata BB

9 March 1st round	FC Parafrente Yonezawa	5–0	Nakayama SC

16 March Quarter-finals	Oyama SC	6–0	Nagai FC

16 March Quarter-finals	Kanai SC	4–0	Nagai Club

23 March Quarter-finals	Yamagata University Faculty of Medicine	0–3	Yamagata BB

24 March Quarter-finals	FC Parafrente Yonezawa	0–0 (5–3 p)	Yamagata University

30 March Semi-finals	Oyama SC	2–1	Kanai SC

30 March Semi-finals	Yamagata BB	0–4	FC Parafrente Yonezawa

6 April Final	Oyama SC	4–2	FC Parafrente Yonezawa

=== Fukushima ===
6 April 1st round	Kitakata FC	1–2	Fukushima Medical University

6 April 1st round	Freedom	0–2	FC Alcatraz

6 April 1st round	FC Beau Belle	3–2	FC Sfidante Soma

6 April 1st round	FFC Sazanka	0–2	Kitashiba Electric

6 April 1st round	Miles	0–1	Viancone Fukushima

13 April 2nd round	Fukushima Medical University	1–1 (4–3 p)	Violet's Shinobu Dream

13 April 2nd round	Higashi Nippon International University	2–1	FC Alcatraz

13 April 2nd round	FC Beau Belle	3–1	Kitashiba Electric

13 April 2nd round	Merry	5–0	Viancone Fukushima

20 April 3rd round	FC Primeiro Fukushima	1–0	Fukushima Medical University

20 April 3rd round	Higashi Nippon International University	6–1	Iwaki Furukawa

20 April 3rd round	Fukushima University	0–1	FC Beau Belle

20 April 3rd round	Merry	0–0 (2–4 p)	Chaneaule Koriyama FC

27 April 4th round	FC Primeiro Fukushima	0–1	Higashi Nippon International University

27 April 4th round	FC Beau Belle	1–1 (5–4 p)	Chaneaule Koriyama FC

4 May 5th round	Higashi Nippon International University	3–0	FC Beau Belle

11 May Final	Fukushima United	10–0	Higashi Nippon International University

=== Ibaraki ===
23 April Quarter-finals	University of Tsukuba	2–0	FC Rowdy Moriya

23 April Quarter-finals	Ryutsu Keizai University FC	2–3	Joyful Honda Tsukuba FC

23 April Quarter-finals	Ryutsu Keizai University	9–0	Tsukuba Syukyu Club

23 April Quarter-finals	Kashima Sawayaka FC	1–2	RKD Ryugasaki

27 April Semi-finals	University of Tsukuba	2–1	Joyful Honda Tsukuba FC

27 April Semi-finals	Ryutsu Keizai University	4–0	RKD Ryugasaki

10 May Final	University of Tsukuba	1–0	Ryutsu Keizai University

=== Tochigi ===
30 March 1st round	Sakushin Gakuin University	2–3	Ashikaga University

30 March 1st round	Vertfee Yaita	1–0	Tochigi City U-25

27 April Semi-finals	Tochigi City FC	10–2	Ashikaga University

27 April Semi-finals	Vertfee Yaita	1–4	Tochigi SC

11 May Final	Tochigi City FC	0–2	Tochigi SC

=== Gunma ===
23 March 1st round	Thespa Gunma Challengers	0–4	Jobu University

23 March 1st round	Ora United	0–2	Tonan Maebashi Satellite

30 March 2nd round	Jobu University	5–0	Tonan Maebashi Satellite

27 April 3rd round	Tonan Maebashi	0–0 (4–5 p)	Jobu University

11 May Final	Thespa Gunma	6–0	Jobu University

=== Saitama ===
27 April Final	Aventura Kawaguchi	0–2	Tokyo International University

=== Chiba ===
10 May Final	Briobecca Urayasu	1–1 (a.e.t.) (4–5 p)	Juntendo University

=== Tokyo ===
26 April Semi-finals	Nankatsu SC	1–3	Meiji University

26 April Semi-finals	Tokyo 23	2–4	Hosei University

10 May Final	Meiji University	1–2	Hosei University

=== Kanagawa ===
1 March 1st round	Tokai University	8–0	Atsugi Hayabusa FC

1 March 1st round	Kanagawa University	0–1	Toho Titanium SC

2 March 1st round	Toin University of Yokohama	1–2	Onodera FC

2 March 1st round	Kanto Gakuin University	7–0	Esperanza SC

9 March 2nd round	Tokai University	1–2	Toho Titanium SC

9 March 2nd round	Onodera FC	2–0	Kanto Gakuin University

16 March 3rd round	Toho Titanium SC	1–2	Onodera FC

27 April 4th round	YSCC Yokohama	1–0	Onodera FC

11 May Final	SC Sagamihara	3–1	YSCC Yokohama

=== Yamanashi ===
9 March 1st round	Espaco Shirane	3–1	Tsuru University

9 March 1st round	Fujiyoshida Club	0–2	Yamanashi University

9 March 1st round	Fortuna SC	1–2	Chillz CF

16 March 2nd round	Nirasaki Astros	1–2	Espaco Shirane

16 March 2nd round	Yamanashi University	3–5	Chuo City Tamaho FC

17 March 2nd round	USC Nanaho	4–0	Chillz CF

17 March 2nd round	FC Rise	0–2	SK Route FC

30 March 3rd round	Espaco Shirane	1–6	Chuo City Tamaho FC

30 March 3rd round	USC Nanaho	0–0 (5–4 p)	SK Route FC

13 April Semi-finals	Yamanashi Gakuin University	2–1	Chuo City Tamaho FC

13 April Semi-finals	USC Nanaho	2–7	YGU Pegasus

27 April Final	Yamanashi Gakuin University	0–2	YGU Pegasus

=== Niigata ===
17 November 2024 1st round	CUPS Seiro	1–1 (5–3 p)	FC Clanimo

24 November 2024 1st round	Niigata University	4–1	AS Jamineiro

17 November 2024 1st round	Granscena Niigata FC	5–2	Sandai FC

17 November 2024 1st round	'09 Keidai FC	1–4	Shimami FC

24 November 2024 1st round	Niigata University of Management FC	0–0 (4–3 p)	Niigata Sangyo University

24 March 2nd round	Aoba FC	0–3	Niigata JSC

24 March 2nd round	CUPS Seiro	6–1	Niigata University

24 March 2nd round	Granscena Niigata FC	1–5	Shimami FC

24 March 2nd round	Niigata University of Management FC	1–0	Niigata University of Management

30 March Quarter-finals	Japan Soccer College	13–0	Niigata JSC

30 March Quarter-finals	CUPS Seiro	1–2	Niigata University of Health and Welfare FC

30 March Quarter-finals	NUHW FC	0–0 (1–4 p)	Shimami FC

30 March Quarter-finals	Niigata University of Management FC	0–4	Niigata University of Health and Welfare

27 April Semi-finals	Japan Soccer College	1–0	Niigata University of Health and Welfare FC

27 April Semi-finals	Shimami FC	0–4	Niigata University of Health and Welfare

10 May Final	Japan Soccer College	2–4 (a.e.t.)	Niigata University of Health and Welfare

=== Nagano ===
22 September 2024 1st round	Nagano University	3–1	Minamiminowa FC

22 September 2024 1st round	MJ's club	3−0 (W.O)	Baldio Nagano

22 September 2024 1st round	Cereja	1–2	FC Violets

22 September 2024 1st round	Azalee Iida	7–1	Gracia Mu

22 September 2024 1st round	FC Atlas	1–1 (4–1 p)	Nakano Esperanza

22 September 2024 1st round	Suzaka City FC	2–1	FC Fellows

10 October 2024 2nd round	Libertas Chikuma FC	1–0	Nagano University

10 October 2024 2nd round	MJ's club	3–2	FC Violets

10 October 2024 2nd round	Azalee Iida	2−0	FC Atlas

10 October 2024 2nd round	Suzaka City FC	0–6	FC Abies

3 November 2024 3rd round	Artista Asama	4–0	Libertas Chikuma FC

3 November 2024 3rd round	MJ's club	0–2	Antelope Shiojiri

17 November 2024 3rd round	FC Matsucelona	3–0	Azalee Iida

17 November 2024 3rd round	FC Abies	1–6	Matsumoto University

23 March 4th round	Artista Asama	2–0	Antelope Shiojiri

23 March 4th round	FC Matsucelona	2–1	Matsumoto University

31 March 5th round	Artista Asama	3–0	FC Matsucelona

27 April 6th round	AC Nagano Parceiro	1–0	Artista Asama

11 May Final	Matsumoto Yamaga FC	1–0	AC Nagano Parceiro

=== Toyama ===
22 September 2024 1st round	Toyama Prefectural Office	2–3	Hokuden Club

22 September 2024 1st round	Wings FC	1–2	FC Ban's

22 September 2024 1st round	Primavera Nyuzen	2–0	Toyama Teachers SC

10 November 2024 2nd round	Valiente Toyama	7–0	Hokuden Club

10 November 2024 2nd round	Fujikoshi	0–4	Ishin Club

10 November 2024 2nd round	Libertad FC	7–0	FC Ban's

10 November 2024 2nd round	Primavera Nyuzen	1–4	Joganji Toyama

24 March 3rd round	Valiente Toyama	4–1	Ishin Club

24 March 3rd round	Libertad FC	1–2	Joganji Toyama

30 March 4th round	N-Style	1–0	Valiente Toyama

30 March 4th round	Joganji Toyama	1–0	Toyama University

27 April 5th round	N-Style	0–2	Joganji Toyama

11 May Final	Toyama Shinjo	7–0	Joganji Toyama

=== Ishikawa ===
30 March 1st round	Kanazawa Gakuin University	3–1	FC Hokuriku

30 March 1st round	SR Komatsu	2–3	Kanazawa Seiryo University

27 April 2nd round	Kanazawa Gakuin University	2–0	Kanazawa Seiryo University

11 May Final	Zweigen Kanazawa	3–0	Kanazawa Gakuin University

=== Fukui ===
6 November 2024 1st round	Fukui University	0–3	Seleção Fukui Campione

17 November 2024 1st round	Awara Club	5–0	Fukui Prefectural University

6 November 2024 1st round	Sabae Azzurri	4–3	Atletico Fukui

17 November 2024 1st round	Fukui Prefectural Office	1–3	Fukui University Faculty of Medicine

13 November 2024 2nd round	Fascino Blu	2–0	Seleção Fukui Campione

24 November 2024 2nd round	Awara Club	1–3	Fukui KSC

13 November 2024 2nd round	SSC Katsuyama	0–2	Sabae Azzurri

24 November 2024 2nd round	Fukui University Faculty of Medicine	1–1 (4–2 p)	Origine

23 March Quarter-finals	Fukui United FC	3–0	Fascino blu

23 March Quarter-finals	Fukui KSC	0–6	Fukui University of Technology

23 March Quarter-finals	Ono FC	1–0	Sabae Azzurri

23 March Quarter-finals	Fukui University Faculty of Medicine	0–3	Sakai Phoenix

27 April Semi-finals	Fukui United FC	5–1	Fukui University of Technology

27 April Semi-finals	Ono FC	0–1	Sakai Phoenix

11 May Final	Fukui United FC	6–0	Sakai Phoenix

=== Shizuoka ===
27 April Semi-finals	Azul Claro Numazu	1–3	Gakunan F. Mosuperio

27 April Semi-finals	Honda FC	2–0	Tokoha University

11 May Final	Gakunan F. Mosuperio	1–2	Honda FC

=== Aichi ===
26 April 1st round	FC Kariya	0–1	Chukyo University

10 May Final	FC Maruyasu Okazaki	0–0 (3–4 p)	Chukyo University

=== Gifu ===
19 April 1st round	FC Gifu Second	3–0	Gifu Kyoritsu University

10 May Final	FC Gifu	3–0	FC Gifu Second

=== Mie ===
27 April Semi-finals	Veertien Mie	2–0	Yokkaichi University

27 April Semi-finals	FC Ise-Shima	2–1	Atletico Suzuka

11 May Final	Veertien Mie	4–0	FC Ise-Shima

=== Shiga ===
30 March 1st round	Rennais Gakuen SC	1–5	Viabenten Shiga

30 March 1st round	Moriyama Samurai 2000	4–0	Biwako SC Rosage

26 April Semi-finals	Biwako Seikei Sport College	2–3	Viabenten Shiga

26 April Semi-finals	Moriyama Samurai 2000	2–1	Reilac Shiga

11 May Final	Viabenten Shiga	0–1	Moriyama Samurai 2000

=== Kyoto ===
26 April Semi-finals	Doshisha University	1–5	Ococias Kyoto AC

26 April Semi-finals	AS Laranja Kyoto	1–2	Kyoto Sangyo University

11 May Final	Ococias Kyoto AC	2–3	Kyoto Sangyo University

=== Osaka ===
30 March 1st round	Kansai University	1–0	St. Andrew's FC

30 March 1st round	Hannan University	1–0	Route 11

27 April Semi-finals	FC Osaka	3–0	Kansai University

27 April Semi-finals	Hannan University	0–3	FC Tiamo Hirakata

11 May Final	FC Osaka	2–1	FC Tiamo Hirakata

=== Hyogo ===
23 March 1st round	FC Basara Hyogo	6–0	Kwangaku Club

26 April Semi-finals	Cento Cuore Harima FC	1–0	Konan University

26 April Semi-finals	FC Basara Hyogo	3–2	Kwansei Gakuin University

10 May Final	Cento Cuore Harima FC	2–2 (2–4 p)	FC Basara Hyogo

=== Nara ===
31 March 1st round	Tenri University	0–2	Porvenir Kashihara Next

26 April Semi-finals	Nara Club	3–0	Porvenir Kashihara Next

26 April Semi-finals	Velago Ikoma	1–2	Asuka FC

10 May Final	Nara Club	2–0	Asuka FC

=== Wakayama ===
16 February 1st round	Diverti Club	1–1 (5–4 p)	Daimon FC Junrelo

23 February 1st round	Kinan Mandalore	1–1 (6–5 p)	FC Azul Wakayama

16 February 1st round	FC Tricky	2–9	FC Ludique

16 February 1st round	FC Diporto	2–1	Solatiora Wakayama

23 February 1st round	Kindai University Faculty of Biophysical Engineering	1–0	Clasicos

16 February 1st round	FC Blaze Yuasa	3–4	Monkey Banana FC

23 February 1st round	Wakayama University	2–0	Wakayama Prefectural Office

16 February 1st round	Ito FC	1–1 (5–3 p)	Kainan FC

2 March 2nd round	FC Wakayama	2–2 (5–6 p)	Diverti Club

9 March 2nd round	Kinan Mandalore	0–1	FC Fortuna

2 March 2nd round	FC Ludique	8–1	FC Diporto

9 March 2nd round	Kindai University Faculty of Biophysical Engineering	0–4	Nanki Orange Sunrise FC

2 March 2nd round	Wakayama Kihoku Shukyudan	4–1	Monkey Banana FC

9 March 2nd round	Wakayama University	1–0	Ito FC

23 March 3rd round	Diverti Club	0–1	FC Fortuna

23 March 3rd round	FC Ludique	0–6	Nanki Orange Sunrise FC

23 March 3rd round	Wakayama Kihoku Shukyudan	0–0 (5–3 p)	Wakayama University

27 April Semi-finals	FC Fortuna	0–4	Nanki Orange Sunrise FC

27 April Semi-finals	Wakayama Kihoku Shukyudan	0–7	Arterivo Wakayama

11 May Final	Nanki Orange Sunrise FC	0–8	Arterivo Wakayama

=== Tottori ===
23 March 1st round	L.tatio	1–2	Zweiens

23 March 1st round	Disparate	2–0	Vermelho

30 March 2nd round	SC Tottori Dreamers	10–1	Zweiens

23 March 2nd round	Kirschen	4–1	HFC

30 March 2nd round	Disparate	1–2	Tottori University

23 March 2nd round	Tottori KFC	0–3	Kero-kai

6 April 3rd round	SC Tottori Dreamers	0–1	Kirschen

6 April 3rd round	Tottori University	1–0	Kero-kai

13 April 4th round	Banmel Tottori	3–0	Kirschen

13 April 4th round	Tottori University	1–9	Yonago Genki SC

20 April 5th round	Banmel Tottori	0–3	Yonago Genki SC

27 April Final	Gainare Tottori	4–0	Yonago Genki SC

=== Shimane ===
6 April 1st round	M.L.C	1–2	Shikou Club

6 April 1st round	SC Matsue	0–0 (5–3 p)	Mikawa Cosmos

13 April 2nd round	Shikou Club	1–0	SC Matsue

20 April Final	Belugarosso Iwami	3–0	Shikou Club

=== Okayama ===
13 April Semi-finals	Mitsubishi Mizushima FC	6–1	Okayama University of Science

13 April Semi-finals	International Pacific University FC	4–1	International Pacific University

19 April Final	Mitsubishi Mizushima FC	1–2	International Pacific University FC

=== Hiroshima ===
6 April Quarter-finals	Fukuyama City FC	4–0	Hiroshima Bunka Gakuen University

6 April Quarter-finals	SRC Hiroshima	1–0	Hiroshima Shudo University

6 April Quarter-finals	Variamore Aki	0–1	Hiroshima University

6 April Quarter-finals	Setouchi Steel FC	0–1	Hiroshima University of Economics

13 April Semi-finals	Fukuyama City FC	5–2	SRC Hiroshima

13 April Semi-finals	Hiroshima University	2–1	Hiroshima University of Economics

20 April Final	Fukuyama City FC	4–0	Hiroshima University

=== Yamaguchi ===
6 April 1st round	AC Valiente	1–0	Yamaguchi University

6 April 1st round	AC Boa Sorte Yamaguchi Ube	14–0	Oshima NCMT

13 April Semi-finals	FC Baleine Shimonoseki	3–1	AC Valiente

13 April Semi-finals	AC Boa Sorte Yamaguchi Ube	2–1	Shunan University

20 April Final	FC Baleine Shimonoseki	3–0	AC Boa Sorte Yamaguchi Ube

=== Kagawa ===
16 February 1st round	Yashima FC	2–7	Seagull FC

23 February 2nd round	Seagull FC	4–1	Kanonji Arte

23 February 2nd round	Kita FC	0–4	Kagawa University

2 March 2nd round	Blue Velho	3–2	Takasho Club

2 March 2nd round	R. Velho Takamatsu	2–1	FC Mirepoix

23 March 3rd round	Takamatsu University	8–1	Seagull FC

9 March 3rd round	Kagawa University	1–7	Tadotsu FC

23 March 3rd round	Shikoku Gakuin University	2–0	Blue Velho

9 March 3rd round	R. Velho Takamatsu	2–2 (5–4 p)	Sonio Takamatsu

30 March 4th round	Takamatsu University	0–1	Tadotsu FC

30 March 4th round	Shikoku Gakuin University	4–0	R. Velho Takamatsu

20 April 5th round	Tadotsu FC	1–0	Shikoku Gakuin University

11 May Final	Kamatamare Sanuki	3–0	Tadotsu FC

=== Tokushima ===
23 February 1st round	FC Unity	11–0	Tokushima Prefectural Office

23 February 1st round	FC Douraku	1–2	Shuyukai

23 February 1st round	FC NJ	6–2	Tokushima University

23 February 1st round	Tokushima City Lazo	1–5	Yellow Monkeys

16 March 2nd round	FC Unity	4–0	Shuyukai

16 March 2nd round	FC NJ	2–1	Yellow Monkeys

30 March 3rd round	FC Unity	1–3	FC NJ

4 May Final	FC NJ	1–7	FC Tokushima

=== Ehime ===
16 February 1st round	St. Catherine University	4–0	FDK Shudo Club

16 February 1st round	Matsuyama University	4–0	Seiyo Style Soccer

16 February 1st round	YFC Shikoku Chuo	2–0	FC Uwajima

16 February 1st round	Ehime University	1–1 (5–4 p)	Aso FC

16 March Quarter-finals	Lvnirosso NC	3–0	St. Catherine University

16 March Quarter-finals	Matsuyama University	2–0	Niihama FC

16 March Quarter-finals	FC Sakurai Beya	1–3	YFC Shikoku Chuo

16 March Quarter-finals	Ehime University	1–0	Hisaeda FC

23 March Semi-finals	Lvnirosso NC	2–1	Matsuyama University

23 March Semi-finals	YFC Shikoku Chuo	1–2	Ehime University

11 May Final	Lvnirosso NC	4–1	Ehime University

=== Kochi ===
9 March 1st round	Nakamura FC	0–5	Kochi University

9 March 1st round	Kochi University of Technology	0–5	Llamas Kochi FC

30 March 2nd round	Kochi University	3–0	Llamas Kochi FC

20 April 3rd round	Kochi University	0–1	KUFC Nankoku

11 May Final	Kochi United SC	1–0	KUFC Nankoku

=== Fukuoka ===
22 March 1st round	KMG Holdings FC	2–0	Kyushu Sangyo University

23 March 1st round	Fukuoka University	1–0	FC Hakata

30 March 2nd round	KMG Holdings FC	3–1	Fukuoka University

11 May Final	Giravanz Kitakyushu	2–1	KMG Holdings

=== Saga ===
27 April Semi-finals	Kawasoe Club	3–0	Atletico Saga

27 April Semi-finals	Saga University	0–3	Brew Saga

4 May Final	Kawasoe Club	0–1	Brew Saga

=== Nagasaki ===
27 April 1st round	Togitsu SC	1–0	Nagasaki Wesleyan University

11 May Final	Mitsubishi Nagasaki SC	4–0	Togitsu SC

=== Kumamoto ===
27 April Semi-finals	FCK Marry Gold Kumamoto	3–1	Kumamoto Gakuen University

27 April Semi-finals	Tokai University Kumamoto	1–2	Hirondelle Kumamoto FC

11 May Final	FCK Marry Gold Kumamoto	1–2	Hirondelle Kumamoto FC

=== Oita ===
26 April 1st round	J-Lease FC	6–1	Estreno FC

26 April 1st round	Nippon Bunri University	1–0	Nippon Steel Oita SC

27 April 2nd round	J-Lease FC	4–1	Nippon Bunri University

11 May Final	Verspah Oita	1–1 (5–4 p)	J-Lease FC

=== Miyazaki ===
9 March 1st round	Miyazaki Sangyo-keiei University	2–1	Takanabe OFC

9 March 1st round	MSG Sognatore FC	3–1	Kyushu University of Health and Welfare

16 March 2nd round	FC Nobeoka Agata	3–0	Miyazaki Sangyo-keiei University

16 March 2nd round	Veroskronos Tsuno	12–0	MSG Sognatore FC

23 March 3rd round	FC Nobeoka Agata	1–4	Veroskronos Tsuno

27 April 4th round	Minebea Mitsumi FC	0–1	Veroskronos Tsuno

11 May Final	Tegevajaro Miyazaki	0–2	Veroskronos Tsuno

=== Kagoshima ===
27 April 1st round	NIFS Kanoya FC	2–0	AT Cielo

27 April 1st round	Liberty FC	5–1	The International University of Kagoshima

29 April 2nd round	NIFS Kanoya FC	9–1	Liberty FC

4 May 3rd round	NIFS Kanoya FC	3–4	NIFS Kanoya

11 May Final	Kagoshima United	4–1	NIFS Kanoya

=== Okinawa ===
23 February 1st round	Meio University	1–2	FC Amawari

23 February 1st round	FC Naha	4–2	FC Yonabaru

23 February 1st round	FC King Kamehameha	6–1	Kochinda FC

23 February 1st round	Okinawa International University	4–0	Okinawa International University SC

23 February 1st round	Nago Sports FC	3–0	FC Nahacelona

23 February 1st round	Siesta Yomitan	1–2	Okinawa University

2 March 2nd round	Kaiho Bank SC	5–0	FC Amawari

2 March 2nd round	FC Naha	1–2	FC King Kamehameha

2 March 2nd round	Okinawa International University	3–0	Nago Sports FC

2 March 2nd round	Okinawa University	1–6	FC Seriole

9 March 3rd round	Kaiho Bank SC	1–0	FC King Kamehameha

9 March 3rd round	Okinawa International University	1–2	FC Seriole

16 March 4th round	Kaiho Bank SC	1–1 (10–9 p)	FC Seriole

27 April 5th round	Okinawa SV	9–0	Kaiho Bank SC

11 May Final	FC Ryukyu	0–1	Okinawa SV

== See also ==
- 2025 Emperor's Cup
