= 2024 Emperor's Cup prefectural qualifiers =

Tournament details
- Country: Japan
- Teams: 500+

The 2024 Emperor's Cup prefectural qualifiers comprised a series of tournaments in which each prefectural champion earned a place in the 2024 Emperor's Cup, Japan's premier national football cup competition. This marks the 28th occasion on which lower-ranking teams have qualified for the Emperor's Cup through prefectural tournaments. Prior to the 1996 Emperor's Cup, such teams gained entry to the competition via regional qualification rounds. For the 2024 edition, the competition continues to be restricted to Type 1 teams (composed mainly of adults), with Type 2 teams (composed of high school undergraduates) blocked from participating. J1 League and J2 League clubs did not participate in the prefectural tournaments, as those clubs are automatically qualified for the Cup.

Usually, the format of the Emperor's Cup opens 48 berths for amateur clubs, with all of them being assigned into the first round of the competition. Alongside the 47 prefectural champions, the JFA annually assigns a specially designated club to complete the roster of 48 amateur teams into the round. The specially designated clubs automatically skip the qualification stage and then, does not participate in their respective prefectural tournaments. On 2024, an exception was made due to the exclusion of Urawa Red Diamonds, who would automatically qualify into the second round of the Emperor's Cup. An extra amateur team, Meiji University, was then, given a direct entry as a second specially designated club into the first round, pushing Honda FC to the second round.

Customarily, university teams are allowed to participate in each tournament. Some university clubs have two or more affiliated teams participating, with its second-and-beyond teams composed of present and past students in that university. The first-team of each universities uses its formal name to distinguish themselves from its affiliated teams, which is most of the time done by attaching abbreviations (such as "FC", "AFC" or "SC") to the names of their respective universities.

== Prefectural champions ==
The 47 prefectural tournaments champions that qualified for the 2024 Emperor's Cup.

Prefecture	Team	League	Apps.
Hokkaido	Hokkaido Tokachi Sky Earth	Hokkaido Soccer League	2nd
Aomori	Vanraure Hachinohe	J3 League	12th
Iwate	Iwate Grulla Morioka	J3 League	12th
Miyagi	Sony Sendai	Japan Football League	25th
Akita	Saruta Kogyo	Tohoku Soccer League D2 North	3rd
Yamagata	Oyama SC	Tohoku Soccer League D2 South	3rd
Fukushima	Fukushima United	J3 League	12th
Ibaraki	University of Tsukuba	Kanto University League D1	34th
Tochigi	Tochigi City	Japan Football League	14th
Gunma	Tonan Maebashi	Kanto Soccer League D2	8th
Saitama	Omiya Ardija	J3 League	29th
Chiba	Briobecca Urayasu	Japan Football League	7th
Tokyo	Yokogawa Musashino	Japan Football League	6th
Kanagawa	SC Sagamihara	J3 League	3rd
Yamanashi	Yamanashi Gakuin University Pegasus	Yamanashi Football League	6th
Nagano	Nagano Parceiro	J3 League	12th
Niigata	Japan Soccer College	Hokushinetsu Football League D1	14th
Toyama	Kataller Toyama	J3 League	15th
Ishikawa	Zweigen Kanazawa	J3 League	20th
Fukui	Fukui United	Hokushinetsu Football League D1	16th
Shizuoka	Azul Claro Numazu	J3 League	3rd
Aichi	Chukyo University	Tokai University League D1	8th
Mie	Veertien Mie	Japan Football League	4th
Gifu	FC Gifu	J3 League	18th
Shiga	Biwako Seikei Sport College	Kansai University League D1	7th
Kyoto	Kyoto Sangyo University	Kansai University League D1	6th
Osaka	Kansai University	Kansai University League D1	19th
Hyogo	Konan University	Kansai University League D1	2nd
Nara	Nara Club	J3 League	15th
Wakayama	Arterivo Wakayama	Kansai Soccer League D1	16th
Tottori	Gainare Tottori	J3 League	26th
Shimane	Belugarosso Iwami	Chugoku Soccer League	3rd
Okayama	Mitsubishi Mizushima	Chugoku Soccer League	16th
Hiroshima	Fukuyama City	Chugoku Soccer League	4th
Yamaguchi	Baleine Shimonoseki	Chugoku Soccer League	4th
Kagawa	Kamatamare Sanuki	J3 League	24th
Tokushima	FC Tokushima	Shikoku Soccer League	9th
Ehime	Ehime FC	J3 League	14th
Kochi	Kochi United	Japan Football League	9th
Fukuoka	Giravanz Kitakyushu	J3 League	15th
Saga	Kawasoe Club	Kyushu Soccer League	4th
Nagasaki	Mitsubishi Nagasaki SC	Nagasaki Football League	11th
Kumamoto	Tokai University Kumamoto	Kyushu University League D1	5th
Oita	J-Lease FC	Kyushu Soccer League	1st
Miyazaki	Tegevajaro Miyazaki	J3 League	4th
Kagoshima	NIFS Kanoya	Kyushu University League D1	13th
Okinawa	Okinawa SV	Japan Football League	5th

== Prefectural tournaments ==
Teams playing in higher tiers usually receive a bye from the early stages of each tournament, with some automatically seeded to the prefectural final. This is the case with many J3 League teams, as the only professional clubs eligible to participate. Some prefectures holds qualification to their prefectural tournaments, splitting "social representatives" and "university representatives" into the qualifiers. This is more prone to occur when two or more clubs from the same prefecture are members of the J3 League and/or Japan Football League, as both leagues' clubs are exempt from being treated as a "social representative", a term which describes amateur clubs whose players are, or were affiliated unanimously, with the same university.

=== Hokkaido ===
11 May Semi-finals	BTOP Hokkaido	1–1 (4–5 p)	Hokkaido UE Iwamizawa

11 May Semi-finals	Hokkaido Tokachi Sky Earth	2–0	Sapporo University

12 May Final	Hokkaido UE Iwamizawa	0–1	Hokkaido Tokachi Sky Earth

=== Aomori ===
31 March 1st round	Blancdieu Hirosaki FC	13–0	FC Rokkasho

31 March 1st round	Bogolle D. Tsugaru	0–1	Shichinohe SC

7 April 2nd round	Blancdieu Hirosaki FC	19–0	Aomori Chuo Gakuin University

7 April 2nd round	Shichinohe SC	1–6	Hachinohe Gakuin University

14 April 3rd round	Blancdieu Hirosaki FC	1–1 (5–4 p)	Hachinohe Gakuin University

21 April 4th round	ReinMeer Aomori	1–2	Blancdieu Hirosaki FC

12 May Final	Blancdieu Hirosaki FC	0–2	Vanraure Hachinohe

=== Iwate ===
17 March 1st round	Hanamaki Club	0–4	Iwate University

17 March 1st round	Oshu United FC	3–0	Tono SC

24 March 2nd round	Fuji University	6–0	Nippon Steel Kamaishi

24 March 2nd round	Iwate University	2–1	Morioka Zebra

24 March 2nd round	Fuji Club	3–0	Oshu United FC

7 April 3rd round	Fuji University	1–0	Iwate University

7 April 3rd round	Fuji Club	2–4	Ganju Iwate

21 April 4th round	Fuji University	3–0	Ganju Iwate

12 May Final	Iwate Grulla Morioka	3–0	Fuji University

=== Akita ===
31 March 1st round	Resaca Nishime	0–1	Akita FC Cambiare

31 March 1st round	Akita University	1–2	Saruta Kogyo

7 April Semi-finals	North Asia University	6–0	Akita FC Cambiare

7 April Semi-finals	Saruta Kogyo	4–2	TDK Shinwakai

14 April Final	North Asia University	0–1	Saruta Kogyo
09:30

=== Miyagi ===
5 November 2023 1st round	Sendai Ohara BICSS	0–0 (2–4 p)	SSC

26 November 2023 1st round	Shichigahama SC	8–1	RICOH Industries Tohoku

26 November 2023 1st round	Sendai Sasuke FC	0–1	Michinoku Sendai FC

12 November 2023 1st round	Tohoku University	4–1	Miyagi University of Education

26 November 2023 2nd round	Tombo FC	1–9	Tohoku Gakuin University

10 December 2023 2nd round	SSC	1–5	Shichigahama SC

10 December 2023 2nd round	Michinoku Sendai FC	3–1	Tohoku University

17 March 3rd round	Cobaltore Onagawa	1–0	Shichigahama SC

17 March 3rd round	Michinoku Sendai FC	1–1 (3–1 p)	Tohoku Gakuin University

24 March 4th round	Cobaltore Onagawa	2–1	Michinoku Sendai FC

21 April 5th round	Cobaltore Onagawa	2–0	Sendai University

12 May Final	Sony Sendai	2–1	Cobaltore Onagawa

=== Yamagata ===
10 March 1st round	Tohoku University CSS	0–7	FC Parafrente Yonezawa

3 March 1st round	Kanai SC	7–1	Chido FC

3 March 1st round	Hagino Club	0–12	Oyama SC

10 March 1st round	Hoei FC	3–5	Nagai Club

3 March 1st round	Yamagata BB	3–1	Shinjo Valiente FC

10 March 1st round	Nakayama SC	0–4	Mikawa SC

17 March Quarter-finals	Yamagata University Faculty of Medicine	6–0	FC Parafrente Yonezawa

24 March Quarter-finals	Kanai SC	0–5	Oyama SC

17 March Quarter-finals	Nagai Club	3–0	Yamagata BB

24 March Quarter-finals	Mikawa SC	1–5	Yamagata University

31 March Semi-finals	Yamagata University Faculty of Medicine	0–1	Oyama SC

31 March Semi-finals	Nagai Club	0–0 (4–5 p)	Yamagata University

7 April Final	Oyama SC	5–3	Yamagata University

=== Fukushima ===
7 April 1st round	FFC Matsushita	1–1 (3–4 p)	FC Sfidante Soma

7 April 1st round	Shirakawa FC	0–3	Fukushima Medical University

7 April 1st round	FC Scheinen Fukushima	4–0	Viancone Fukushima

14 April 2nd round	FC Sfidante Soma	1–1 (1–4 p)	Iwaki Furukawa FC

14 April 2nd round	Kitakata FC	2–1	Miles

14 April 2nd round	Fukushima Medical University	3–0	Violet's Nobuo Dream

14 April 2nd round	Merry	0–1	FC Scheinen Fukushima

21 April 3rd round	Higashi Nippon International University	2–2 (1–4 p)	Iwaki Furukawa FC

21 April 3rd round	Kitakata FC	1–3	FC Primeiro Fukushima

21 April 3rd round	Chaneaule Koriyama FC	1–0	Fukushima Medical University

21 April 3rd round	FC Scheinen Fukushima	1–3	Fukushima University

28 April 4th round	Iwaki Furukawa FC	1–2	FC Primeiro Fukushima

28 April 4th round	Chaneaule Koriyama FC	1–0	Fukushima University

5 May 5th round	FC Primeiro Fukushima	3–2	Chaneaule Koriyama FC

12 May Final	Fukushima United	7–0	FC Primeiro Fukushima

=== Ibaraki ===
17 April 1st round	Ryutsu Keizai University	3–0	Joyful Honda Tsukuba

17 April 1st round	Sakai Trinitas	2–1	FC Rowdy Moriya

21 April Semi-finals	University of Tsukuba	3–1	Ryutsu Keizai University

21 April Semi-finals	Sakai Trinitas	1–3	RKU Dragons

12 May Final	University of Tsukuba	2–1	RKU Dragons

=== Tochigi ===
21 April Semi-finals	Tochigi City FC	2–0	FC Casa Fortuna Oyama

21 April Semi-finals	Sakushin Gakuin University	0–2	Vertfee Yaita

12 May Final	Tochigi City FC	0–0 (10–9 p)	Vertfee Yaita

=== Gunma ===
24 March 1st round	Tonan Maebashi Satellite	0–2	Thespa Gunma Challengers

21 April 2nd round	Jobu University	5–2	Thespa Gunma Challengers

12 May Final	Tonan Maebashi	2–1	Jobu University

=== Saitama ===
20 April 1st round	Tokyo International University FC	1–1 (4–3 p)	Tokyo International University

11 May Final	Omiya Ardija	1–0	Tokyo International University FC

=== Chiba ===
25 February 1st round	Ichikawa SC	2–3	Josai International University

25 February 1st round	Chiba University of Commerce	0–4	Nagareyama FC

3 March 1st round	IBU FC	1–2	HCS FC

3 March 2nd round	Vonds Ichihara	4–1	Josai International University

3 March 2nd round	Nagareyama FC	0–0 (2–4 p)	Chuo Gakuin University

10 March 2nd round	International Budo University	2–1	Teikyo Heisei University

10 March 2nd round	HCS FC	0–2	Juntendo University

17 March 3rd round	Vonds Ichihara	2–0	Chuo Gakuin University

17 March 3rd round	International Budo University	0–3	Juntendo University

31 March 4th round	Vonds Ichihara	3–0	Juntendo University

20 April Final	Briobecca Urayasu	1–0	Vonds Ichihara

=== Tokyo ===
21 April Semi-finals	Yokogawa Musashino FC	3–1	Waseda University

21 April Semi-finals	Aries Tokyo FC	2–3	Nihon University

11 May Final	Yokogawa Musashino FC	1–1 (5–4 p)	Nihon University

=== Kanagawa ===
2 March 1st round	Tokai University	4–3	Atsugi Hayabusa FC

2 March 1st round	Kanagawa University	0–1	Toho Titanium SC

3 March 1st round	Toin University of Yokohama	2–1	Onodera FC

3 March 1st round	Senshu University	5–0	Toin University of Yokohama FC

10 March 2nd round	Tokai University	1–1 (5–6 p)	Toho Titanium SC

10 March 2nd round	Toin University of Yokohama	2–1	Senshu University

21 April Semi-finals	SC Sagamihara	2–0	Toho Titanium SC

12 May Semi-finals	Toin University of Yokohama	3–1	YSCC Yokohama

12 May Final	SC Sagamihara	5–0	Toin University of Yokohama

=== Yamanashi ===
10 March 1st round	Tamaho FC	7–0	FC Rise

10 March 1st round	SK Route FC	2–0	FC Silvertina

10 March 1st round	Fujiyoshida Club	4–6	FC Progress Chizuka

17 March Quarter-finals	Nirasaki Astros	6–0	Espaco Shirane

17 March Quarter-finals	Tamaho SC	3–3 (6–7 p)	Fortuna SC

24 March Quarter-finals	USC Nanaho	2–2 (10–9 p)	SK Route FC

24 March Quarter-finals	FC Progress Chizuka	4–6	YGU Pegasus

14 April Semi-finals	Nirasaki Astros	2–1	Fortuna SC

14 April Semi-finals	USC Nanaho	0–1	YGU Pegasus

5 May Final	Nirasaki Astros	2–3	YGU Pegasus

=== Niigata ===
12 November 2023 1st round	Shimami FC	7–0	Suicide Squad

26 November 2023 1st round	NUHW FC	5–0	Tsubamesanjo City FC

3 December 2023 1st round	'09 Keidai FC	1–0	Niigata JSC

26 November 2023 1st round	Niigata Sangyo University	5–0	Aoba FC

12 November 2023 1st round	CUPS Seiro	2–2 (4–5 p)	Sandai FC

26 November 2023 1st round	05' Kamo FC	7–1	Nagaoka Estilo

24 March 2nd round	Niigata University	1–7	Shimami FC

24 March 2nd round	NUHW FC	7–1	'09 Keidai FC

24 March 2nd round	Niigata Sangyo University	3–0	Sandai FC

24 March 2nd round	05' Kamo FC	2–1	FC Schale

31 March Quarter-finals	Niigata University HW	8–1	Shimami FC

31 March Quarter-finals	NUHW FC	3–2	Niigata University of Management

31 March Quarter-finals	Japan Soccer College	6–0	Niigata Sangyo University

31 March Quarter-finals	05' Kamo FC	1–1 (4–5 p)	Niigata University HW FC

21 April Semi-finals	Niigata University of Health and Welfare	4–0	NUHW FC

21 April Semi-finals	Japan Soccer College	2–1	05' Kamo FC

5 May Final	Niigata University of Health and Welfare	1–2	Japan Soccer College

=== Nagano ===
24 September 2023 1st round	Iijima FC	2–1	FC Matsumoto

24 September 2023 1st round	FC Violet's	3–0	Nagano University

24 September 2023 1st round	Cereja	0−3 (W.O)	MJ's club

24 September 2023 1st round	Nakano Esperanza	4–0	Top Stone

24 September 2023 1st round	YS Estrela	0–5	FC Abies

24 September 2023 1st round	Suzaka City FC	1–0	FC Atlas

24 September 2023 1st round	FC Arkas	0–4	Azalee Iida

22 October 2023 2nd round	Libertas Chikuma FC	1–1 (7–8 p)	Iijima FC

22 October 2023 2nd round	FC Violet's	3–0	MJ's club

22 October 2023 2nd round	Nakano Esperanza	0−3 (W.O)	FC Abies

22 October 2023 2nd round	Suzaka City FC	0–1	Azalee Iida

12 November 2023 3rd round	Artista Asama	3–0	Iijima FC

12 November 2023 3rd round	FC Violet's	1–4	FC Matsucelona

12 November 2023 3rd round	Antelope Shiojiri	9–1	FC Abies

12 November 2023 3rd round	Azalee Iida	0–8	Matsumoto University

24 March 4th round	Artista Asama	4–0	FC Matsucelona

24 March 4th round	Antelope Shiojiri	2–2 (4–2 p)	Matsumoto University

31 March 5h round	Artista Asama	1–0	Antelope Shiojiri

21 April 6th round	AC Nagano Parceiro	3–1	Artista Asama

12 May Final	AC Nagano Parceiro	1–1 (4–3 p)	Matsumoto Yamaga FC

=== Toyama ===
10 September 2023 1st round	Oyabe FC	3–1	FC Ban's

17 September 2023 1st round	Valiente Toyama	3–0	Fujikoshi

10 September 2023 1st round	Toyama Club	5–2	FC Southern

17 September 2023 1st round	Toyama Teachers SC	1–1 (7–8 p)	Hokuden Club

17 September 2023 1st round	Joganji Toyama	0–1	Giocatore Takaoka

17 September 2023 1st round	Toyama Phoenix FC	2–2 (3–5 p)	Ishin Club

24 September 2023 2nd round	Libertad FC	7–0	Oyabe FC

24 September 2023 2nd round	Valiente Toyama	7–0	Toyama Club

24 September 2023 2nd round	Hokuden Club	0–0 (4–5 p)	Toyama Prefectural Office

24 September 2023 2nd round	Giocatore Takaoka	1–3	Ishin Club

24 March 3rd round	N-Style	3–1	Toyama Prefectural Office

24 March 3rd round	Ishin Club	0–6	Toyama University

24 March 3rd round	Libertad FC	1–1 (7–6 p)	Valiente Toyama

31 March 4th round	N-Style	1–1 (3–4 p)	Toyama University

31 March 4th round	Libertad FC	0–2	Toyama Shinjo

21 April 5th round	Toyama University	1–6	Toyama Shinjo

12 May Final	Kataller Toyama	2–0	Toyama Shinjo

=== Fukui ===
29 October 2023 1st round	Club Okuetsu	1–7	Sabae Azzurri FC

19 November 2023 1st round	Fukui KSC	0–2	Fukui University Faculty of Medicine

29 October 2023 1st round	CC Boys	1–7	Seleção Fukui Campione

12 November 2023 1st round	Awara Club	5–1	Patliare Sabae

15 October 2023 1st round	Fukui Prefectural Office	0–4	Takefu Club

12 November 2023 1st round	Nanjo Club	2–2 (4–3 p)	Geomix Maruoka

12 November 2023 1st round	Patliare Sabae Forza	0–15	Fukui University

26 November 2023 2nd round	Sabae Azzurri	2–2 (3–4 p)	Fukui University Faculty of Medicine

19 November 2023 2nd round	Fascino Blu	1–8	Seleção Fukui Campione

19 November 2023 2nd round	Awara Club	4–3	Takefu Club

26 November 2023 2nd round	Nanjo Club	0–10	Fukui University

31 March Quarter-finals	Fukui United FC	20–0	Fukui University Faculty of Medicine

31 March Quarter-finals	Seleção Fukui Campione	0–2	Ono FC

31 March Quarter-finals	Fukui University of Technology	3–0	Awara Club

31 March Quarter-finals	Fukui University	1–4	Sakai Phoenix

21 April Semi-finals	Fukui United FC	9–0	Ono FC

21 April Semi-finals	Fukui University of Technology	1–2	Sakai Phoenix

12 May Final	Fukui United FC	5–0	Sakai Phoenix

=== Shizuoka ===
12 May Final	Azul Claro Numazu	2–0	Tokoha University

=== Aichi ===
20 April 1st round	FC Kariya	1–2	Chukyo University

11 May Final	FC Maruyasu Okazaki	2–3	Chukyo University

=== Gifu ===
20 April 1st round	Gifu Shotoku Gakuen University	0–0 (4–5 p)	FC Bombonera

11 May Final	FC Gifu	5–0	FC Bombonera

=== Mie ===
21 April Semi-finals	Atletico Suzuka	1–0	Yokkaichi University

21 April Semi-finals	Veertien Mie	3–0	FC Ise-Shima

12 May Final	Atletico Suzuka Club	1–3	Veertien Mie

=== Shiga ===
31 March 1st round	Moriyama Samurai 2000	2–0	Viabenten Shiga

31 March 1st round	Rennais Gakuen SC	0–2	Biwako Seikei Sport College

21 April Semi-finals	Reilac Shiga	2–0	Moriyama Samurai 2000

21 April Semi-finals	Biwako Seikei Sport College	2–1	Lagend Shiga FC

11 May Final	Reilac Shiga	1–2	Biwako Seikei Sport College

=== Kyoto ===
20 April Semi-finals	Ococias Kyoto AC	3–1	Ritsumeikan University

20 April Semi-finals	Kyoto Sangyo University	2–1	AS Laranja Kyoto

12 May Final	Ococias Kyoto AC	0–4	Kyoto Sangyo University

=== Osaka ===
31 March 1st round	Momoyama Gakuin University	3–2	Hannan University Club

31 March 1st round	Kansai University	3–0	AC Middlerange

20 April Semi-finals	FC Osaka	2–3	Momoyama Gakuin University

20 April Semi-finals	Kansai University	3–2	FC Tiamo Hirakata

12 May Final	Momoyama Gakuin University	1–2	Kansai University

=== Hyogo ===
24 March 1st round	FC Basara Hyogo	4–2	FC Crescent

21 April Semi-finals	Cento Cuore Harima FC	0–2	Konan University

21 April Semi-finals	FC Basara Hyogo	0–2	Kwansei Gakuin University

12 May Final	Konan University	2–2 (8–7 p)	Kwansei Gakuin University

=== Nara ===
31 March 1st round	Porvenir Kashihara Next	0–1	Tenri University

21 April 2nd round	Tenri University	0–2	Asuka FC

12 May Final	Nara Club	1–0	Asuka FC

=== Wakayama ===
11 February 1st round	Daimon FC	1–1 (4–5 p)	Monkey Banana FC

11 February 1st round	Nanki Orange Sunrise FC	2–1	Kinan Mandalore

11 February 1st round	FC Blaze Yuasa	0–0 (4–3 p)	FC Tricky

11 February 1st round	FC Azul Wakayama	0–1	Classicos

11 February 1st round	Solatiora Wakayama	1–2	Wakayama Prefectural Office

11 February 1st round	FC Ludique	4–1	Kindai University Faculty of Biophysical Engineering

10 March 2nd round	Wakayama Kihoku Shukyudan	6–0	Monkey Banana FC

10 March 2nd round	Nanki Orange Sunrise FC	0–0 (6–5 p)	Wakayama University

10 March 2nd round	Kainan FC	2–1	FC Blaze Yuasa

10 March 2nd round	Classicos	2–6	Club Diverti

10 March 2nd round	Ito FC	1–1 (4–2 p)	Wakayama Prefectural Office

10 March 2nd round	FC Ludique	3–3 (4–5 p)	FC Wakayama

17 March 3rd round	Wakayama Kihoku Shukyudan	3–0	Nanki Orange Sunrise FC

17 March 3rd round	Kainan FC	2–2 (3–5 p)	Club Diverti

17 March 3rd round	Ito FC	1–2	FC Wakayama

21 April Semi-finals	Wakayama Kihoku Shukyudan	3–2	Club Diverti

21 April Semi-finals	FC Wakayama	0–2	Arterivo Wakayama

12 May Final	Wakayama Kihoku Shukyudan	0–9	Arterivo Wakayama

=== Tottori ===
17 March 1st round	L.tatio	2–0	Zweiens

17 March 1st round	Vermelho	1–1 (3–1 p)	HFC

17 March 1st round	Tottori KFC	0–1	Kirschen

24 March 2nd round	Tottori University	1–3	L.tatio

24 March 2nd round	SC Tottori Dreamers	0–4	Kero-kai

24 March 2nd round	Vermelho	1–6	Disparate

31 March 3rd round	L.tatio	0–3	Kero-kai

31 March 3rd round	Disparate	2–1	Kirschen

7 April 4th round	Banmel Tottori	7–0	Kero-kai

7 April 4th round	Disparate	0–11	Yonago Genki SC

14 April 4th round	Disparate	0–1	Yonago Genki SC

21 April Final	Gainare Tottori	3–2	Yonago Genki SC

=== Shimane ===
7 April 1st round	SC Matsue	3–1	M.L.C

7 April 1st round	Shikou Club	0–1	Hikawa Cosmos

14 April 2nd round	SC Matsue	2–1	Hikawa Cosmos

21 April Final	Belugarosso Iwami	3–0	SC Matsue

=== Okayama ===
7 April Semi-finals	Mitsubishi Mizushima FC	8–0	Okayama University of Science

7 April Semi-finals	ENEOS Mizushima	0–1	International Pacific University

21 April Final	Mitsubishi Mizushima FC	2–1	International Pacific University

=== Hiroshima ===
7 April Quarter-finals	SRC Hiroshima	0–1	Hiroshima University of Economics

7 April Quarter-finals	Hatsukaichi FC	0–2	Hiroshima Bunka Gakuen University

7 April Quarter-finals	Fujifilm BIJ Hiroshima FC	0–2	Hiroshima University

7 April Quarter-finals	Fukuyama City FC	9–0	Hiroshima Shudo University

14 April Semi-finals	Hiroshima University of Economics	3–2	Hiroshima Bunka Gakuen University

14 April Semi-finals	Hiroshima University	0–3	Fukuyama City FC

21 April Final	Hiroshima University of Economics	0–4	Fukuyama City FC

=== Yamaguchi ===
7 April 1st round	Onoda SC	1–8	Yamagata University

7 April 1st round	Indigo FC Yamaguchi	5–0	Oshima NCMT

14 April Semi-finals	FC Baleine Shimonoseki	7–0	Yamaguchi University

14 April Semi-finals	Indigo FC Yamaguchi	1–4	Shunan University

21 April Final	FC Baleine Shimonoseki	3–0	Shunan University

=== Kagawa ===
11 February 1st round	Takasho Club	1–1 (5–4 p)	FC Mirepoix

25 February 2nd round	Takasho Club	0–2	Kanonji Arte

25 February 2nd round	Sonio Toamatsu	4–0	Kita FC

3 March 2nd round	Yashima FC	3–1	Kagawa University

3 March 2nd round	Blue Velho	2–0	Seagull FC

24 March 3rd round	Takamatsu University	9–0	Kanonji Arte

10 March 3rd round	Sonio Takamatsu	0–3	R.Velho Takamatsu

24 March 3rd round	Shikoku Gakuin University	4–0	Yashima FC

10 March 3rd round	Blue Velho	0–1	Tadotsu FC

31 March 4th round	Takamatsu University	5–1	R. Velho Takamatsu

31 March 4th round	Shikoku Gakuin University	1–1 (3–0 p)	Tadotsu FC

21 April 5th round	Takamatsu University	1–0	Shikoku Gakuin University

12 May Final	Kamatamare Sanuki	3–2	Takamatsu University

=== Tokushima ===
18 February 1st round	FC Unity	2–0	Shuyukai

18 February 1st round	Tokushima University	3–3 (4–5 p)	Yellow Monkeys

18 February 1st round	FC Douraku	6–2	Tokushima Prefectural Office

18 February 1st round	Tokushima City Lazo	0–6	FC NJ

17 March 2nd round	FC Unity	2–3	Yellow Monkeys

17 March 2nd round	FC Douraku	1–5	FC NJ

31 March 3rd round	Yellow Monkeys	2–3	FC NJ

12 May Final	FC NJ	0–4	FC Tokushima

=== Ehime ===
18 February 1st round	FDK Shudo Club	2–3	Hisaeda FC

25 February 2nd round	Ehime University	2–1	St. Catherine University

25 February 2nd round	Hisaeda FC	0–4	Matsuyama University

25 February 2nd round	FC Sakurai Beya	0–8	Aso FC

25 February 2nd round	Yamaji FC	1–2	Lvnirosso NC

17 March 3rd round	Ehime University	2–4	Matsuyama University

17 March 3rd round	Aso FC	0–0 (1–4 p)	Lvnirosso NC

24 March 4th round	Matsuyama University	1–2	Lvnirosso NC

12 May Final	FC Imabari	6–1	Lvnirosso NC

=== Kochi ===
3 March 1st round	Kochi University of Technology	1–1 (9–8 p)	Nakamura FC

3 March 1st round	FC RSG	1–3	Llamas Kochi FC

10 March 2nd round	KUFC Nankoku	2–0	Kochi University of Technology

10 March 2nd round	Llamas Kochi FC	0–0 (7–8 p)	Kochi University

29 April 3rd round	KUFC Nankoku	2–0	Kochi University

12 May Final	Kochi United SC	5–0	KUFC Nankoku

=== Fukuoka ===
23 March 1st round	KMG Holdings FC	1–0	Kyushu Sangyo University

24 March 1st round	Fukuoka University	2–1	Itazuke FC

31 March 2nd round	KMG Holdings FC	0–4	Fukuoka University

12 May Final	Giravanz Kitakyushu	4–0	Fukuoka University

=== Saga ===
17 March 1st round	Atletico Saga	3–0	FC Alegre Caminho

17 March 1st round	Saga University	2–0	FC Tosu

21 April Semi-finals	Kawasoe Club	2–1	Atletico Saga

21 April Semi-finals	Saga University	0–4	Brew Kashima

12 May Final	Kawasoe Club	0–0 (4–3 p)	Brew Kashima

=== Nagasaki ===
21 April 1st round	Togitsu SC	0–0 (4–5 p)	Nagasaki Wesleyan University

11 May Final	Mitsubishi Nagasaki SC	1–0	Nagasaki Wesleyan University

=== Kumamoto ===
21 April Semi-finals	Kumamoto Gakuen University	1–0	FCK Marry Gold Kumamoto

21 April Semi-finals	Shimazu Motors SC	0–1	Tokai University Kumamoto

12 May Final	Kumamoto Gakuen University	1–1 (2–4 p)	Tokai University Kumamoto

=== Oita ===
10 March 1st round	Nippon Bunri University	4–1	FC Nakatsu

10 March 1st round	Nippon Steel Oita SC	1–1 (5–6 p)	Kyushu Sogo Sports College

20 April 2nd round	Nippon Bunri University	2–0	Kyushu Sogo Sports College

21 April 3rd round	J-Lease FC	3–1	Nippon Bunri University

12 May Final	Verspah Oita	0–2	J-Lease FC

=== Miyazaki ===
3 March 1st round	Miyazaki Sangyo-keiei University	10–0	Takanabe OFC

3 March 1st round	Nexus Miyako FC	2–1	Kyushu University HW

10 March 2nd round	FC Nobeoka Agata	3–1	Miyazaki Sangyo-keiei University

10 March 2nd round	Veroskronos Tsuno	1–0	Nexus Miyako FC

24 March 3rd round	FC Nobeoka Agata	0–2	Veroskronos Tsuno

21 April 4th round	Minebea Mitsumi FC	2–4	Veroskronos Tsuno

12 May Final	Tegevajaro Miyazaki	2–0	Veroskronos Tsuno

=== Kagoshima ===
21 April 1st round	NIFS Kanoya FC	1–0	Kirishima Reds

21 April 1st round	Re.chu	1–0	The International University of Kagoshima

3 May 2nd round	NIFS Kanoya FC	2–1	Re.chu

5 May Final	NIFS Kanoya	6–0	NIFS Kanoya FC

=== Okinawa ===
18 February 1st round	Okidai Chuo SC	0–8	FC Seriole

18 February 1st round	FC King Kamehameha	3–1	Okinawa University

18 February 1st round	Nago Sports FC	1–1 (4–5 p)	Meio University

10 March 1st round	Enagic FC Naha	2–0	FC Amawari

10 March 1st round	Okinawa International University SC	2–1	Siesta Yomitan

17 March 2nd round	Okinawa International University	1–2	FC Seriole

17 March 2nd round	FC King Kamehameha	2–3	Meio University

17 March 2nd round	Enagic FC Naha	8–0	Okinawa International University SC

10 March 2nd round	FC Superiore	1–4	Kaiho Bank SC

24 March 3rd round	FC Seriole	2–1	Meio University

24 March 3rd round	Enagic FC Naha	0–0 (7–6 p)	Kaiho Bank SC

31 March 4th round	FC Seriole	1–1 (4–5 p)	Enagic FC Naha

21 April 5th round	Okinawa SV	7–0	Enagic FC Naha

12 May Final	FC Ryukyu	0–1	Okinawa SV

== See also ==
- 2024 Emperor's Cup
