= Kazuya Niwa =

Japanese footballer

Personal information
- Date of birth: 25 June 1998 (age 28)
- Place of birth: Aichi, Japan
- Height: 1.71 m (5 ft 7 in)
- Position: Midfielder

Team information
- Current team: Vanraure Hachinohe
- Number: 27

Youth career
- –2020: Niigata University of Management

Senior career*
| Years | Team | Apps | (Gls) |
| 2021– | Vanraure Hachinohe | 66 | (0) |
- * Club domestic league appearances and goals as of 02:11, 29 August 2023 (UTC)

Kazuya Niwa (丹羽 一陽, Niwa Kazuya; born 25 June 1998) is a Japanese footballer currently playing as a midfielder for Vanraure Hachinohe.

== Career statistics ==
=== Club ===
As of 14 March 2021.

| Club | Season | League | | | National Cup | | League Cup | | Other | | Total | |
| Club | Season | Division | Apps | Goals | Apps | Goals | Apps | Goals | Apps | Goals | Apps | Goals |
|---|---|---|---|---|---|---|---|---|---|---|---|---|
| Vanraure Hachinohe | 2021 | J3 League | 1 | 0 | 0 | 0 | – | | 0 | 0 | 1 | 0 |
| Career total | | | 1 | 0 | 0 | 0 | 0 | 0 | 0 | 0 | 1 | 0 |
