= Ashikaga Institute of Technology =

Coordinates: 36°21′11.5″N 139°23′49.4″E

Ashikaga University
- 足利大学
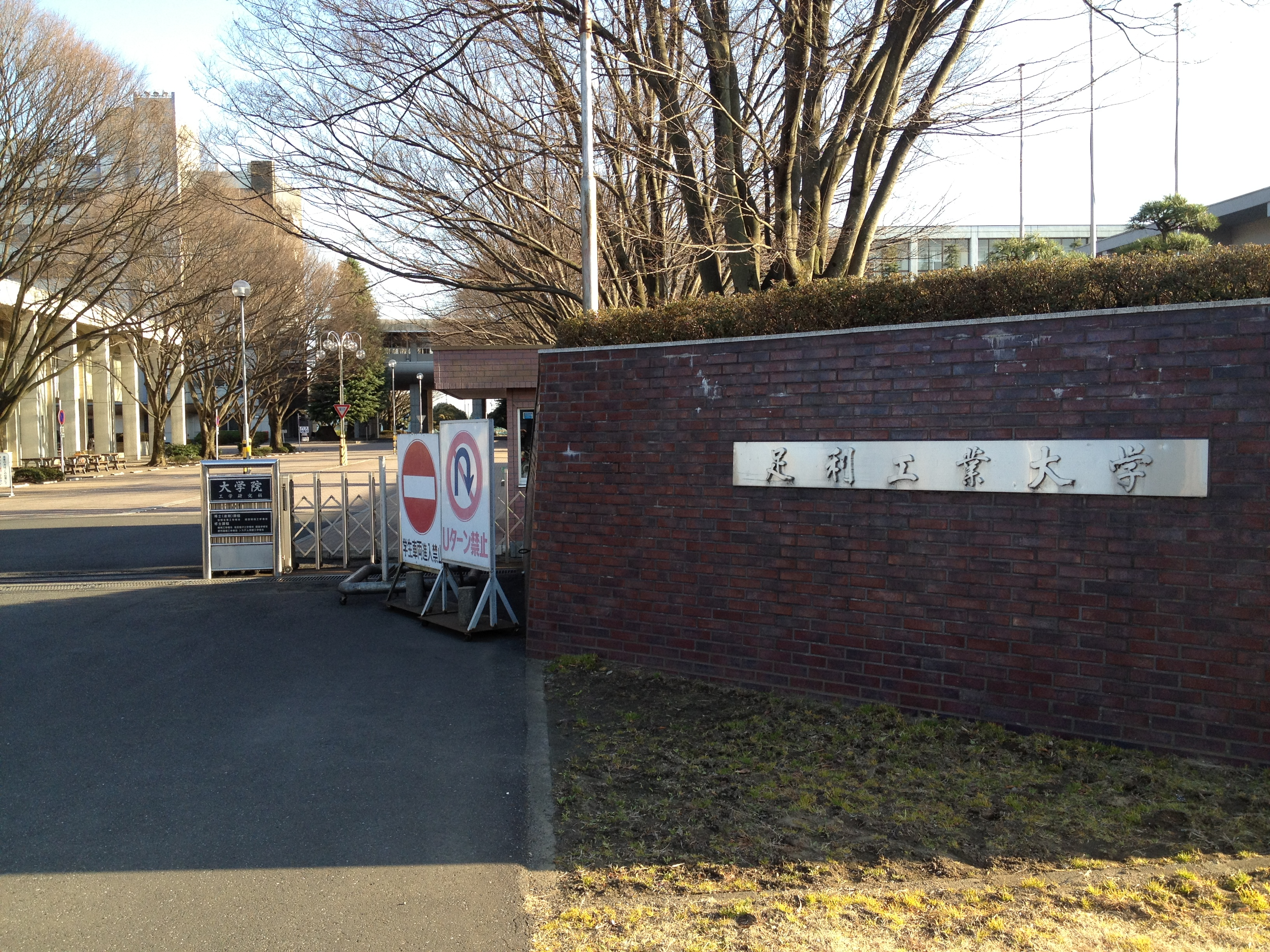
- Ashikaga University
- Type: Private
- Established: 1967
- President: Yoshitaka Suetake
- Location: Ashikaga, Tochigi, Japan
- Website: http://www.ashitech.ac.jp/

Ashikaga University (足利大学, Ashikaga daigaku) is a private university in Ashikaga, Tochigi, Japan, established in 1967.
