= Hachinohe Gakuin University =

Private university in Aomori Prefecture, Japan

Coordinates: 40°29′05″N 141°35′22″E

- 八戸学院大学
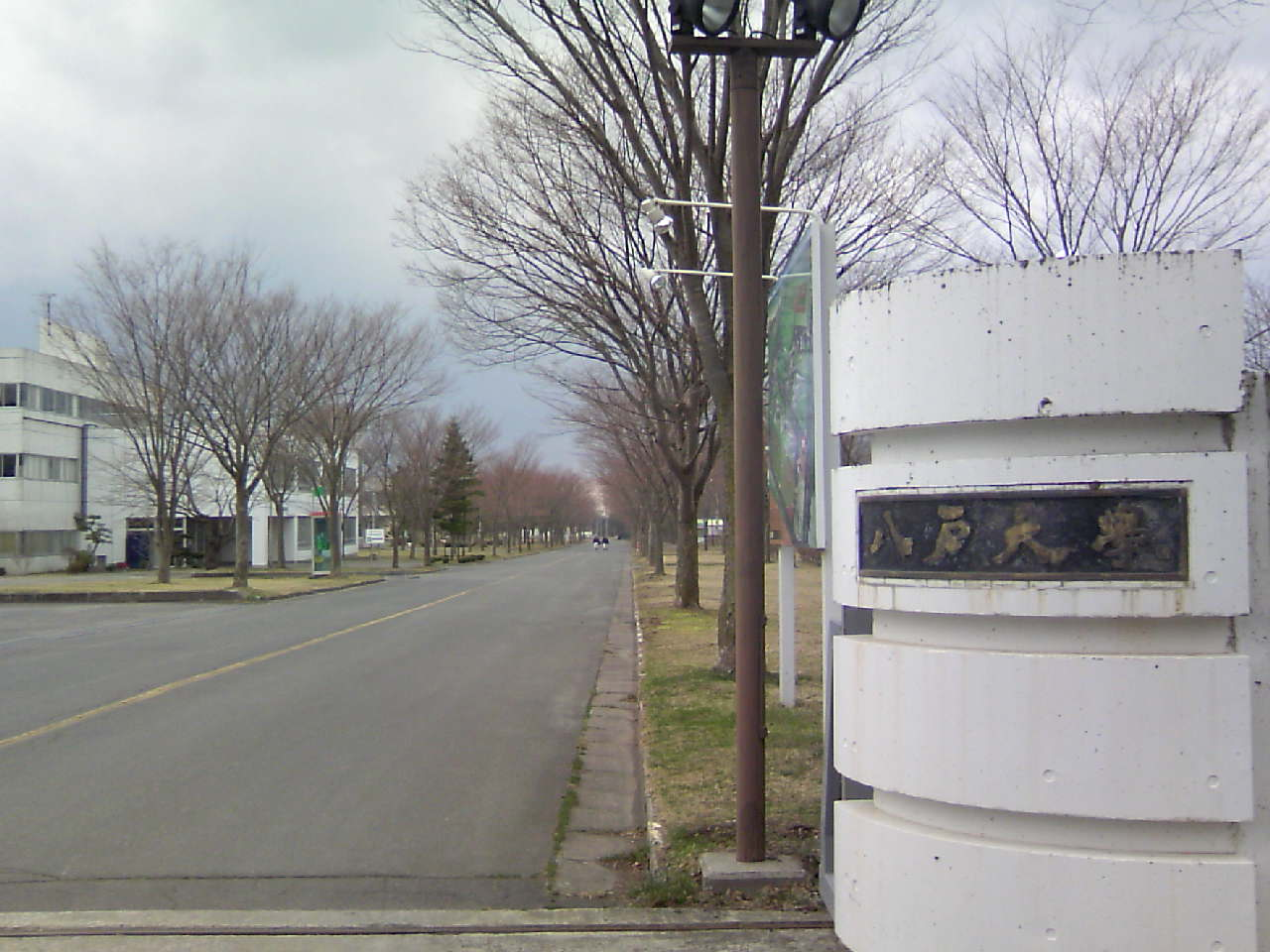
- The main gate of Hachinohe Gakuin University
- Type: Private
- Established: 1981
- President: Masaki Ōtani
- Location: Hachinohe, Aomori, Japan
- Website: Official website

Hachinohe Gakuin University (八戸学院大学, Hachinohe gakuin daigaku) is a private university in Hachinohe, Aomori Prefecture, Japan, established in 1981. The university consists of two schools: the Business Faculty and the Health Care Faculty. The Business Faculty is made up of the Management Course and the Community Course, while the Health Care Faculty is divided into the Human Health Department and the Nursing Department.

== Notable alumni ==
- Shogo Akiyama - baseball player
- Junki Nozato [it] - basketball player
