= Nagano University =

Public university in Ueda, Nagano, Japan

Coordinates: 36°22′8.9″N 138°13′23.2″E

- 長野大学, Nagano Daigaku
- Type: Public University
- Established: 1966
- Location: Ueda, Nagano, Japan
- Website: www.nagano.ac.jp

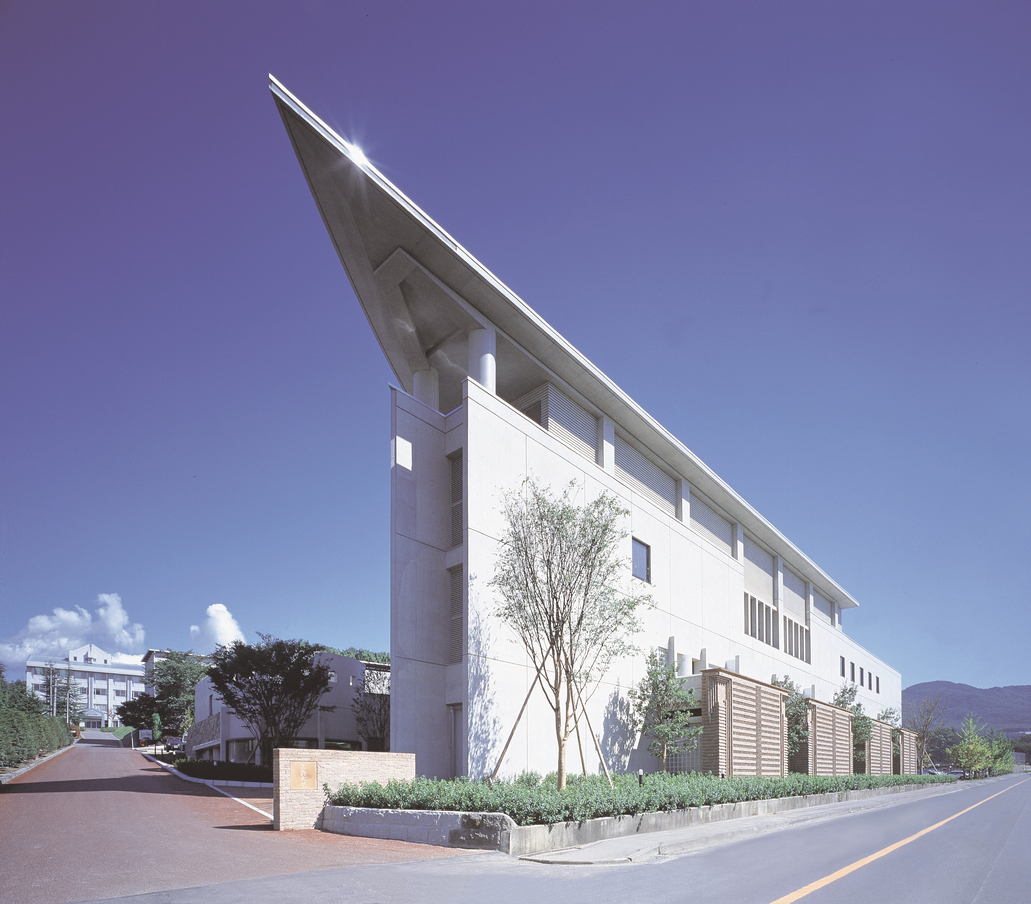
Nagano University

Nagano University (長野大学, Nagano daigaku) is a public university in Ueda, Nagano, Japan, established in 1966. A private university when founded, it became a public university in 2017.
