= Kyushu University of Health and Welfare =

University in Japan

Coordinates: 32°34′06″N 131°36′49″E

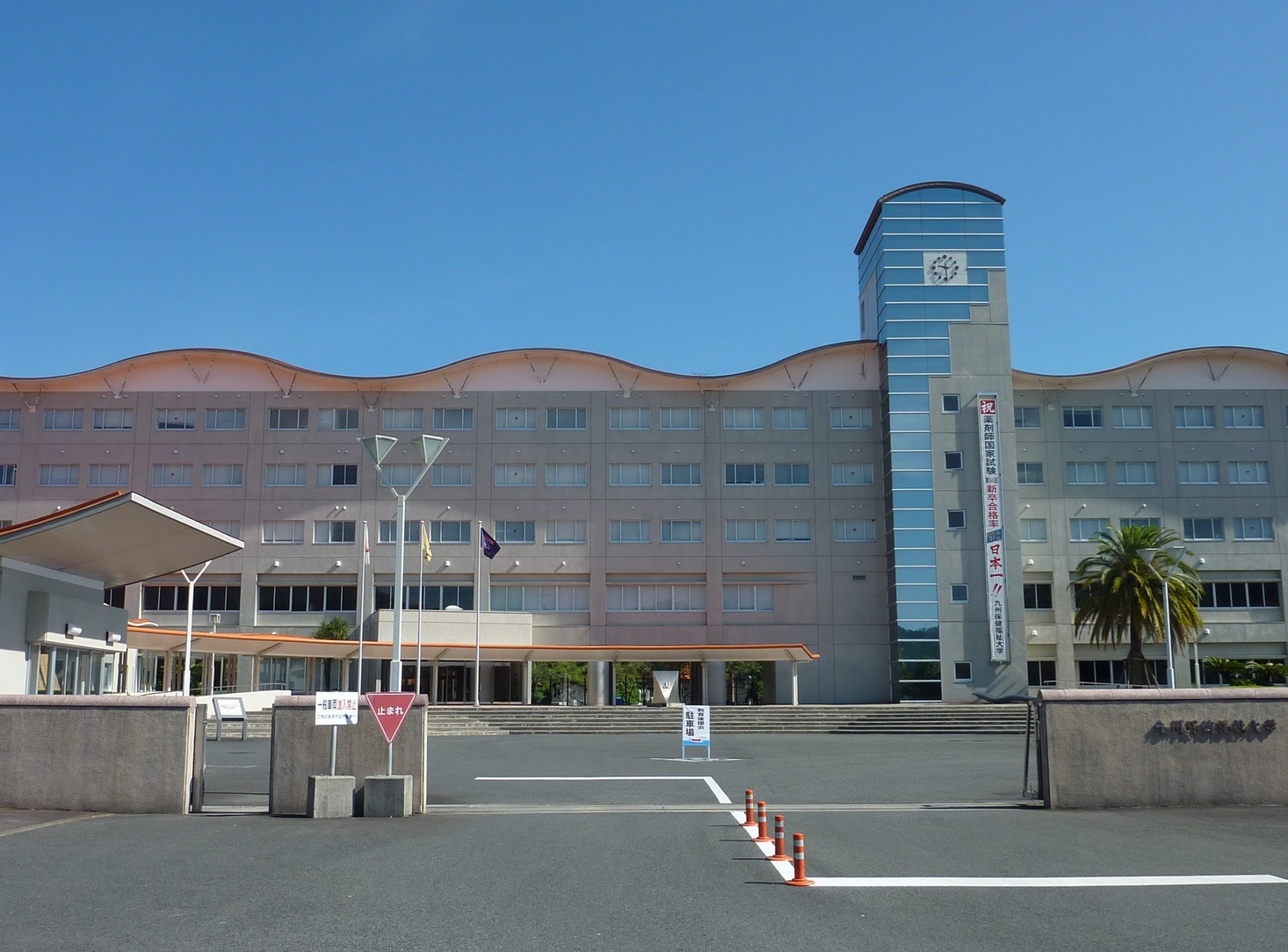

Kyushu University of Health and Welfare (九州保健福祉大学, Kyūshū hoken fukushi daigaku) is a private university in Nobeoka, Miyazaki, Japan, established in 1999.

== History ==
- January 1967 ( Showa 42) -- Authority for the establishment of Takaryo Gakuen School Corporation
