= The International University of Kagoshima =

Coordinates: 31°29′41″N 130°29′45″E

- 鹿児島国際大学
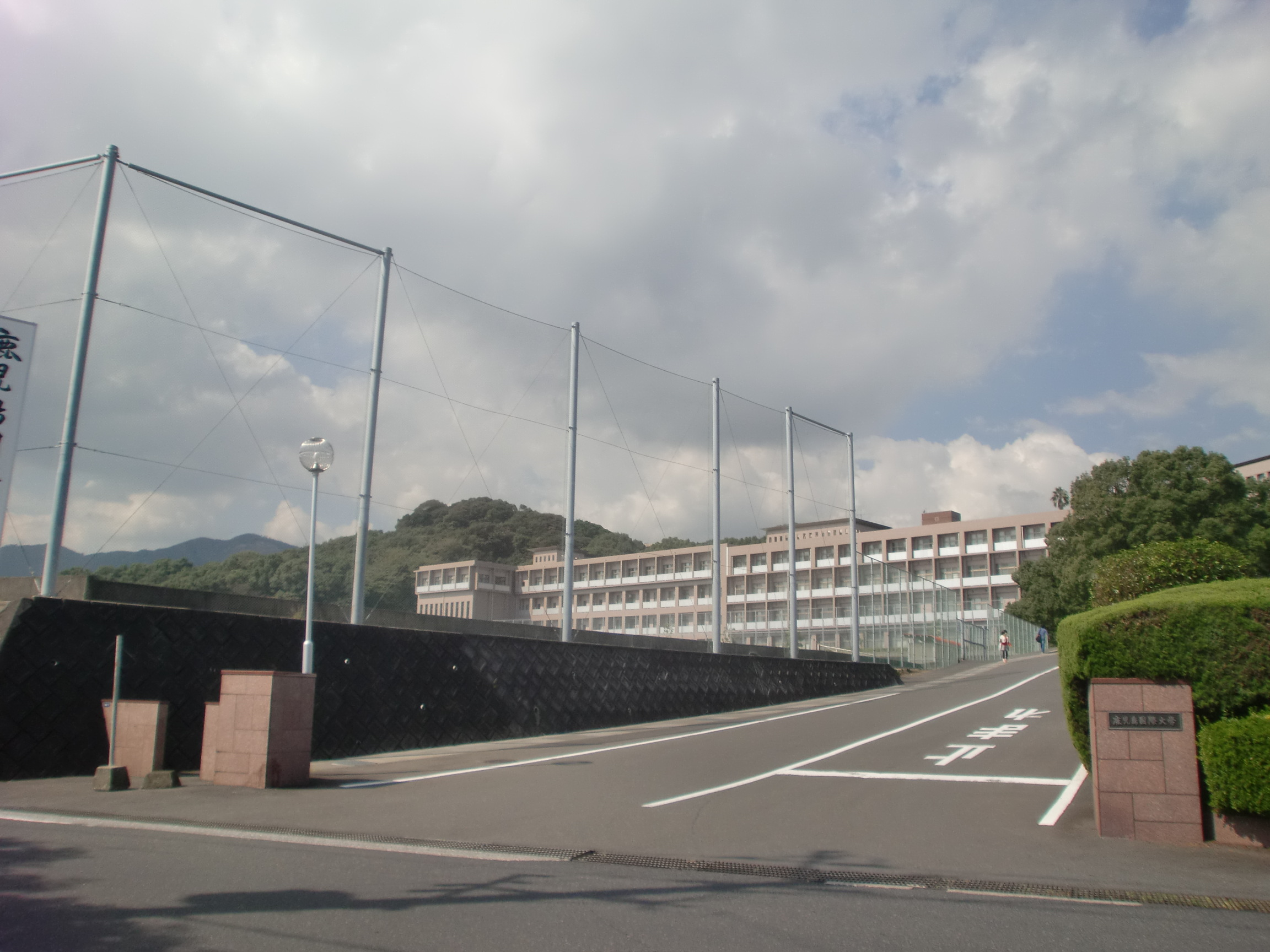
- Type: Private
- Established: 1960
- President: Satoshi Sechiyama
- Students: 3,964
- Location: Kagoshima, Kagoshima, Japan
- Campus: Sakanoue
- Website: Official website

The International University of Kagoshima (鹿児島国際大学, Kagoshima kokusai daigaku) is a private university in Kagoshima, Kagoshima, Japan. The predecessor of the school was founded in 1932, and it was chartered as a junior university in 1950. In 1960, it became a four-year college.
