= Kumamoto Gakuen University =

Private University in Kunamoto, Japan

Coordinates: 32°48′N 130°43′E

- 熊本学園大学
- Motto: 師弟同行 Shitei dōkō (Teachers and students working together)
- Type: Private
- Established: 1954
- President: Ryoichi Koda
- Academic staff: 148 full-time
- Undergraduates: 7,437
- Postgraduates: 115
- Location: Kumamoto, Kumamoto Prefecture, Japan
- Website: www.kumagaku.ac.jp (in English)

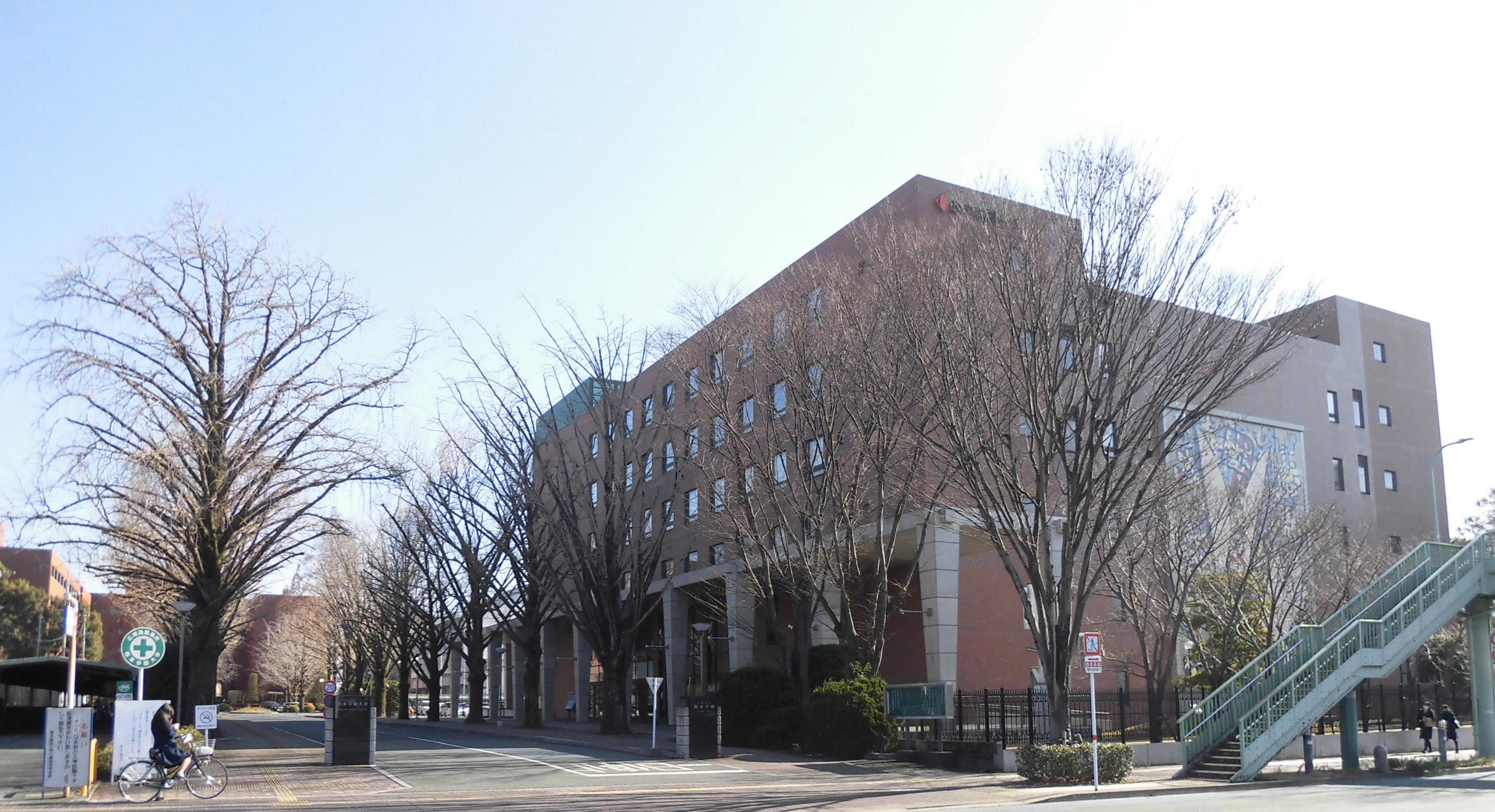
Kumamoto Gakuen University

Kumamoto Gakuen University (熊本学園大学, Kumamoto Gakuen daigaku) called Gakuendai (学園大) or Shōdai (商大), is a private Japanese university in Kumamoto, Japan. It was established in 1942, at which time Eastern Language Vocational College (東洋語学専門学校 Tōyō Gengo Senmon Gakkō) was subsumed into it. It was renamed Kumamoto Language Vocational College (熊本言語専門学校 Kumamoto Gengo Senmon Gakkō) in 1945, and was made into Kumamoto Commerce University (熊本商科大学 Kumamoto shōka daigaku) in 1954. It acquired its current name, Kumamoto Gakuen University, in 1994. At present, the university has 4 faculties with 11 departments.

The university also has an affiliated senior high school, located immediately adjacent to the campus. While the high school is recognized as one of the best in the prefecture, the reputation of the university itself is as a second-rank institution.

== Faculties and graduate schools ==
=== Faculties ===
- the Faculty of Commercial Science(in English)
  - Commercial Science (main)
  - Business
  - Hospitality Management
  - Commercial Science (minor)
- the Faculty of Economics(in English)
  - Economics
  - International Economics
  - Legal Economics
- the Faculty of Foreign Languages(in English)
  - English
  - East Asian Studies
- the Faculty of Social Welfare(in English)
  - Social Welfare (main)
  - Social Work and Environmental Design
  - Child welfare environmental subject
  - Social Welfare (minor)

=== Graduate schools ===
- Commercial Science(in Japanese)
  - Commercial Science
- Business Management(in Japanese)
  - Business Management
- Economics(in Japanese)
  - Economics
- International Culture(in Japanese)
  - majoring International Culture
- Social Welfare(in Japanese)
  - Social Welfare
  - Social Work and Environmental Design

== Points of interest ==
The Open Research Center for Minamata Studies: this center carries out research into Minamata disease. Masazumi Harada is the head of this center.

== Partner institutions ==
Partner Institutions KGU has signed agreements with 18 different partner institutions in the 9 countries listed below.

=== United States ===
- Montana State University home page is here
- The University of Montana
- Carroll College (Montana)
- University of the Incarnate Word
- University of Wisconsin–Eau Claire

=== United Kingdom ===
- Liverpool John Moores University
- University of Central Lancashire

=== New Zealand ===
- Unitec New Zealand

=== Australia ===
- La Trobe University

=== Canada ===
- Saint Mary's University
- Carleton University

=== Republic of Korea ===
- Daejeon University

=== People's Republic of China ===
- Shenzhen University
- Renmin University of China (Beijing)
- Beijing International Studies University
- Guangxi Normal University (Guilin)
- Beijing Language and Culture University

=== Kingdom of Thailand ===
- Chulalongkorn University

=== Socialist Republic of Viet Nam ===
- Vietnam National University Hanoi

== Famous alumni ==
- Yoku Hata Japanese comedian
- Eiji Ezaki Japanese pro wrestler
- Mr. Gannosuke Japanese pro wrestler from Nagasaki, member of IWA.
- Hoseki Miyata Former president of the Miyazaki Taiyo bank
- Midori Asai Kumamoto TV announcer.
- Akihiro Tanaka Economist and president of Ushio Inc.
- Yasuo Matsuoka Economist and former president LAWSON. INC.
