= University of Fukui =

National university in Fukui Prefecture, Japan

Coordinates: 36°04′37″N 136°12′43″E

- 福井大学
- Type: Public (National)
- Established: 1949
- President: Takanori Ueda
- Administrative staff: 1,798 (as of 2016)
- Undergraduates: 4,083 (as of 2016)
- Postgraduates: 994 (as of 2016)
- Location: Fukui, Fukui, Japan
- Mascot: None

The University of Fukui (福井大学, Fukui Daigaku; abbreviated to 福大 Fukudai) is a national university of Japan located in the city of Fukui, Fukui, Japan.

== History ==
University of Fukui was established in 1949 by integrating three national colleges in Fukui Prefecture: Fukui Normal School (福井師範学校, Fukui shihan gakkō; founded in 1873), Fukui Normal School for Youth (福井青年師範学校, Fukui seinen shihan gakkō; founded in 1944) and Fukui Technical College (福井工業専門学校, Fukui kōgyō semmon gakkō; founded in 1923).

The university at first had two faculties: Faculty of Liberal Arts and Faculty of Engineering.

- 1966: The Faculty of Liberal Arts was renamed Faculty of Education.
- 1983: Fukui University of Medical Science Hospital was established.
- 1999: The Faculty of Education was renamed Faculty of Education and Regional Studies.
- 2003: Fukui University of Medical Science (福井医科大学, Fukui Ika Daigaku) was merged with University of Fukui to constitute Faculty of Medical Sciences, and then Fukui University of Medical Science Hospital was renamed University of Fukui Hospital.

== Schools and graduate schools ==
University of Fukui has four undergraduate schools (学部) and three graduate schools (大学院研究科).

=== Undergraduate schools ===
- School of Education (教育学部)
- School of Engineering (工学部)
- School of Global and Community Studies (国際地域学部)
- School of Medical Sciences (医学部)

=== Graduate schools ===
- Graduate School of Education (大学院教育学研究科)
- Graduate School of Engineering (大学院工学研究科)
- Graduate School of Medical Sciences (大学院医学系研究科)

== Campuses ==
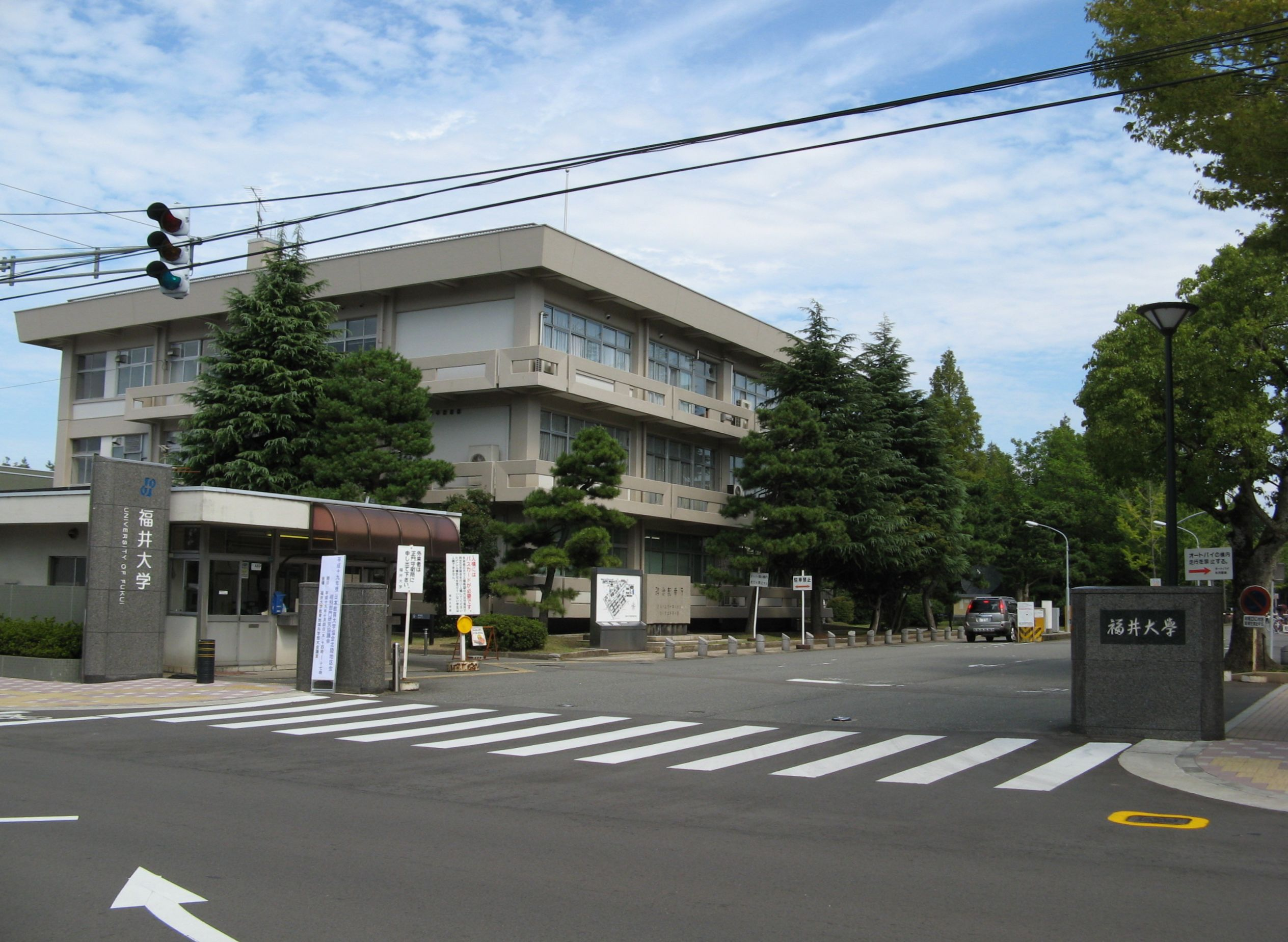
University of Fukui Entrance Gate

- Bunkyo (文京, Bunkyō) Campus

Education, Engineering, Global and Community Studies

- Matsuoka (松岡, Matsuoka) Campus

Medical Sciences

- Tsuruga (敦賀, Tsuruga) Campus

Research Institute of Nuclear Engineering
