= Jobu University =

Private university in Isesaki, Gunma, Japan

Coordinates: 36°16′44″N 139°10′39″E

Jōbu University
- 上武大学
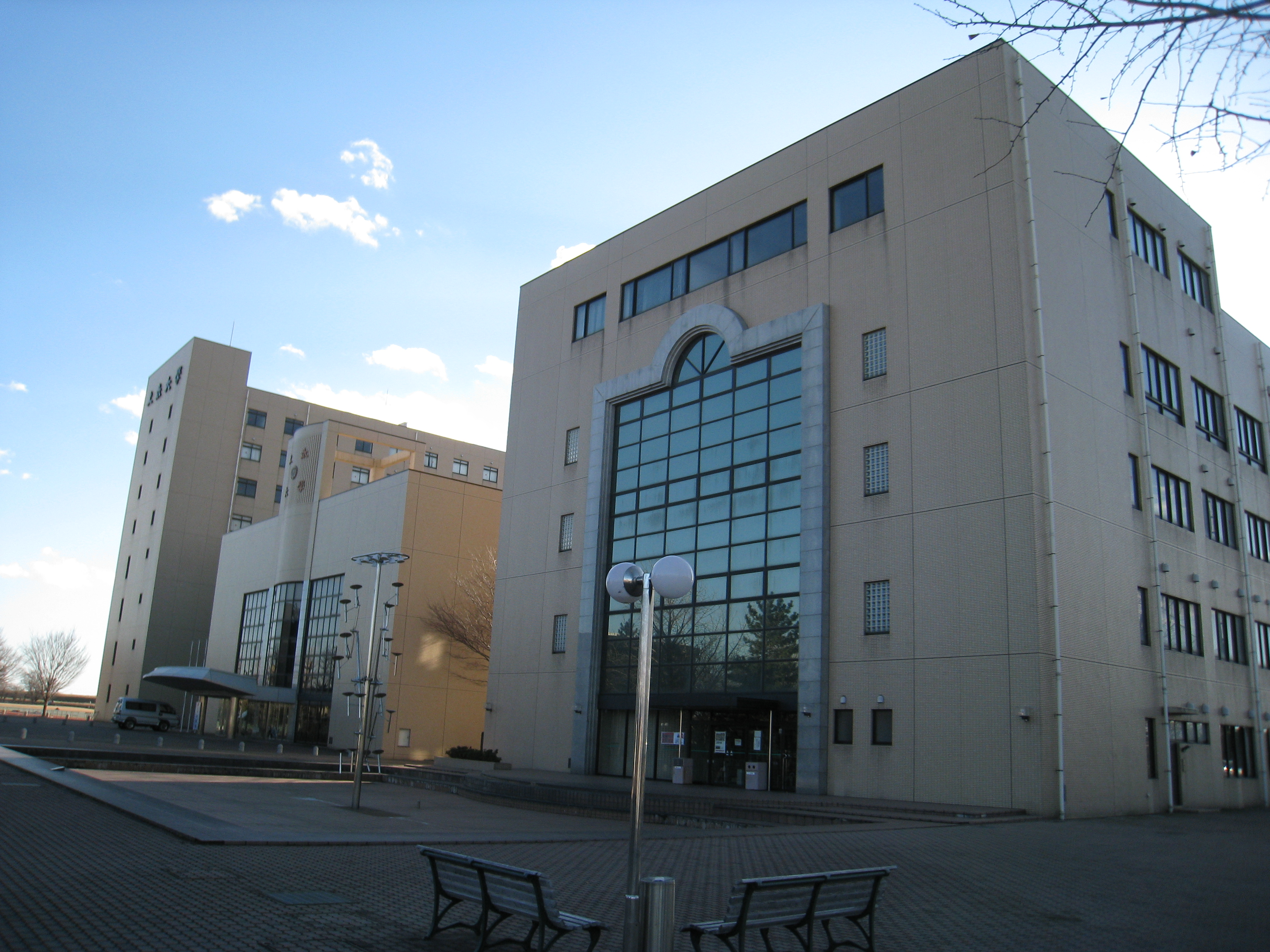
- Type: Private
- Established: Founded 1952; Chartered 1957
- President: Mr. Masashi Shibuya
- Undergraduates: 757 (as of 2014)
- Postgraduates: 41 (as of 2014)
- Location: Isesaki, Gunma, Japan
- Website: Official website

Jobu University (上武大学, Jōbu daigaku) is a private university in Isesaki, Gunma, Japan, established in 1968. The predecessor of the school was founded in 1950. The university has a secondary campus in the city of Takasaki, Gunma.

== History ==
- 1968: Jobu University was established (with Department of Commercial Science). Shinmachi High School and Shinmachi Kindergarten were annexed to Jobu University and were renamed to Jobu University High School and Jobu University Kindergarten, respectively.
- 1986: School of Business, Department of Business Management and Information was established.
- 1997: Graduate School of Management and Administration was established.
- 2002: Department of Commercial Science was renamed to School of Business Information, International Business Department.
- 2004: Shinmachi Campus (current Takasaki Campus) opened. The School of Nursing was established.
- 2008: Takasaki Media Center opened.
- 2012: School of Business Information, International Business Department and School of Business, Department of Business Management and Information were merged and renamed to School of Business Information, Department of Sports and Health Management.

== Organization ==
=== Undergraduate ===
- School of Business Information
  - Department of Sports and Health Management (244 students as of 2014)
  - Department of International Business (123 students as of 2014)
- School of Nursing
  - Department of Nursing (390 students as of 2014)

=== Graduate ===
- School of Management and Administration (41 students as of 2014)
  - Management and Administration Track
  - Accounting System Track
  - Management and Information System Track
  - Marketing Distribution and Economics Track
  - Sports and Health Management Track

== Student life ==
=== Sports ===
- Baseball
- Long-distance relay road race
  - Jobu University has participated in Hakone Ekiden since 2009 for seven consecutive years.

=== Handwriting Culture Lab ===
Headed by Mr. Kunio Koike, a leading artist and educator in Etegami (Drawing Letter), the Handwriting Culture Lab was established in 2014 to study hand-writing and hand-drawing as part of indispensable part of humanities. The Lab consists of five faculty members and Ms. Tomoko Shibuya, Chairperson of the Board of Trustees of Jobu University, as an advisor.

== Facilities ==
=== Campus ===
- Isesaki Campus (634-1 Toyazukamachi, Isesaki, Gunma 3728588)
  - School of Business Information
  - Baseball and football fields
- Takasaki Campus (270-1 Shinmachi, Takasaki, Gunma 3701393)
  - School of Nursing and Graduate School of Management and Administration
