= Hiroshima Bunka Gakuen University =

Coordinates: 34°17′19″N 132°38′13″E

Hiroshima Bunka Gakuen University (広島文化学園大学, Hiroshima bunka gakuen daigaku) is a private university in Kure, Hiroshima, Japan. The school first opened as a junior women's college in 1986 and became a four-year college in 1995. It features annual festivals and performances as events to promote the university.
