= Meio University =

University in Okinawa Prefecture, Japan

- 名桜大学; Meiō Daigaku
- Motto: Peace, Freedom, Progress
- Type: Public
- Established: 1994
- President: Katsunori Yamazato
- Students: 2095
- Undergraduates: 2063
- Postgraduates: 32
- Location: Nago, Okinawa Prefecture, Japan; 26.625°N 127.975°E
- Website: www.meio-u.ac.jp

Meio University (名桜大学, Meiō Daigaku) is a public university in Nago, Okinawa Prefecture, Japan. Meio was established as a private university in 1994 and was reorganized as a public university in 2010.

== History ==
The university established the Liberal Arts Center in 2011, which was renamed as the "University Center for Liberal Arts Education" in 2015. The university also has several student support facilities that include the Language Learning Center, the Mathematics and Sciences Learning Center, and the Writing Center. The Graduate School of International Cultural Studies was established in 2001.

== Undergraduate and Graduate School Programs ==
- College of International Studies
  - International Culture
  - Language Education
  - Management
  - Information Systems
  - Health Information Management
  - Tourism Industry
- Faculty of Human Health Sciences
  - Sports and Health Sciences
  - Nursing
- Graduate School
  - Graduate School of International Cultural Studies
  - Graduate School of Nursing

Meio University has established international academic exchange programs with 23 universities in 14 countries. In addition, the university also offers many short-term study abroad programs. Japanese language courses from basic to advanced levels are offered. Exchange programs are offered with the following schools:

- Brock University
- Chung Chou University of Science and Technology
- University of Malaya
- George Fox University
- Hasanuddin University
- Hunan Agricultural University
- Beijing Union University
- Jeju National University
- Kainan University
- Keimyung University
- Long Island University
- Mae Fah Luang University
- Manila University
- Myongji University
- National Autonomous University of Mexico
- National University of Kaohsiung
- Niagara University
- San Martin de Porres
- Shandong University
- Siam University
- Southeast Missouri State University
- Springfield College
- State University of Londrina
- Tajen University
- Universidad de Ciencias Empresariales y Sociales
- Universidad del Pacifico
- University of Central Lancashire
- University of Guam
- University of Hawaiʻi at Hilo
- University of Hawaiʻi at West Oʻahu
- University of Lethbridge
- University of Wollongong
- Vietnam National University
