= Fukui University of Technology =

Coordinates: 36.069085°N 136.19607°E

- 福井工業大学; Fukui Kōgyō Daigaku
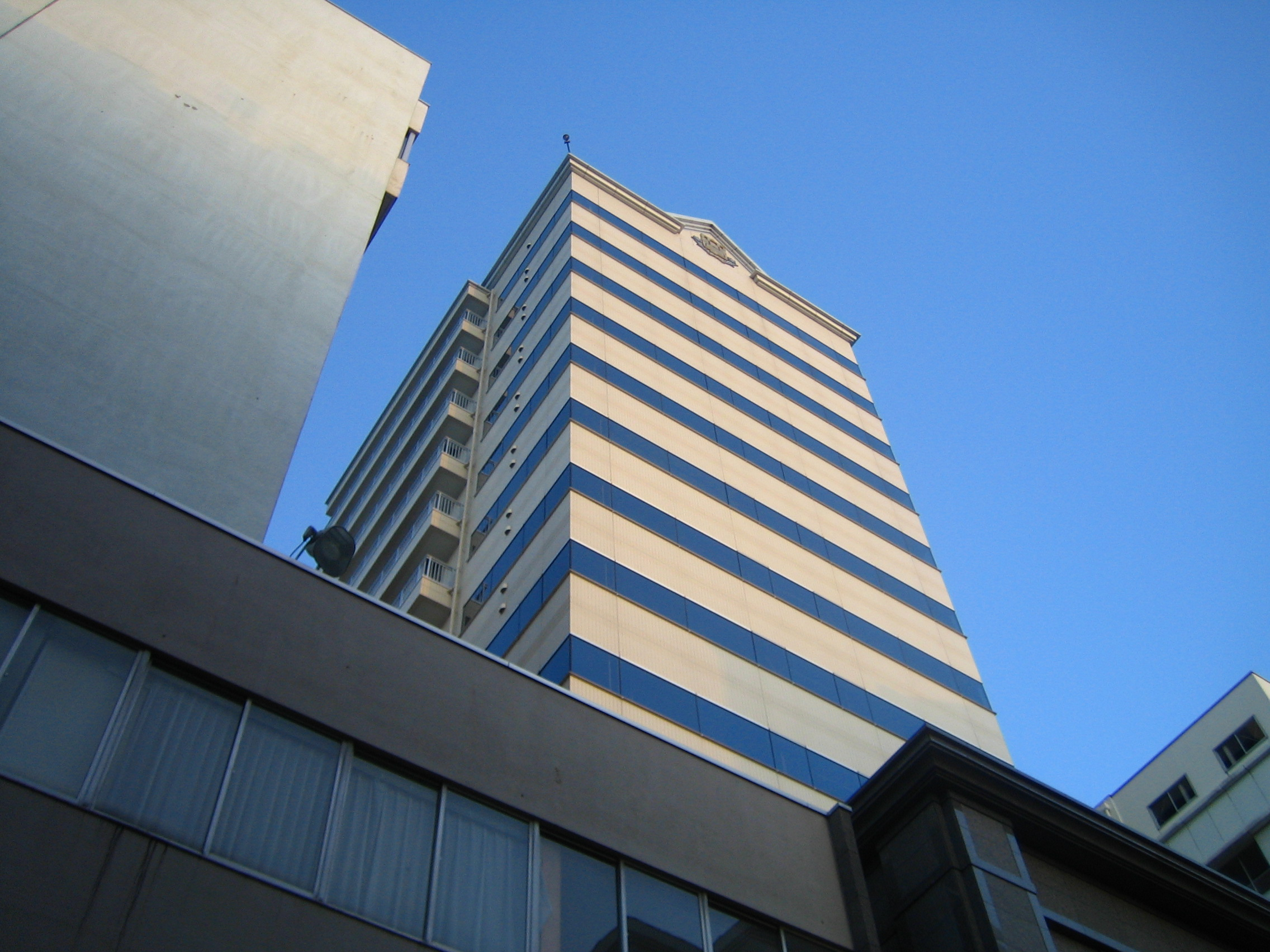
- Type: Private
- Established: 1950
- President: Yōtarō Morishima
- Undergraduates: 2,274 (2016)
- Postgraduates: 39 (2016)
- Location: Fukui, Fukui, Japan
- Website: Official website

The Fukui University of Technology (福井工業大学, Fukui Kōgyō Daigaku) is a private university founded in 1950 and located in Fukui, Fukui Prefecture, Japan. The university has undergraduate faculties in engineering, environmental and information sciences, and sports and health sciences, as well as a graduate department for applied science and engineering.
