= Matsuyama University =

Coordinates: 33.8558°N 132.767°E

- 松山大学
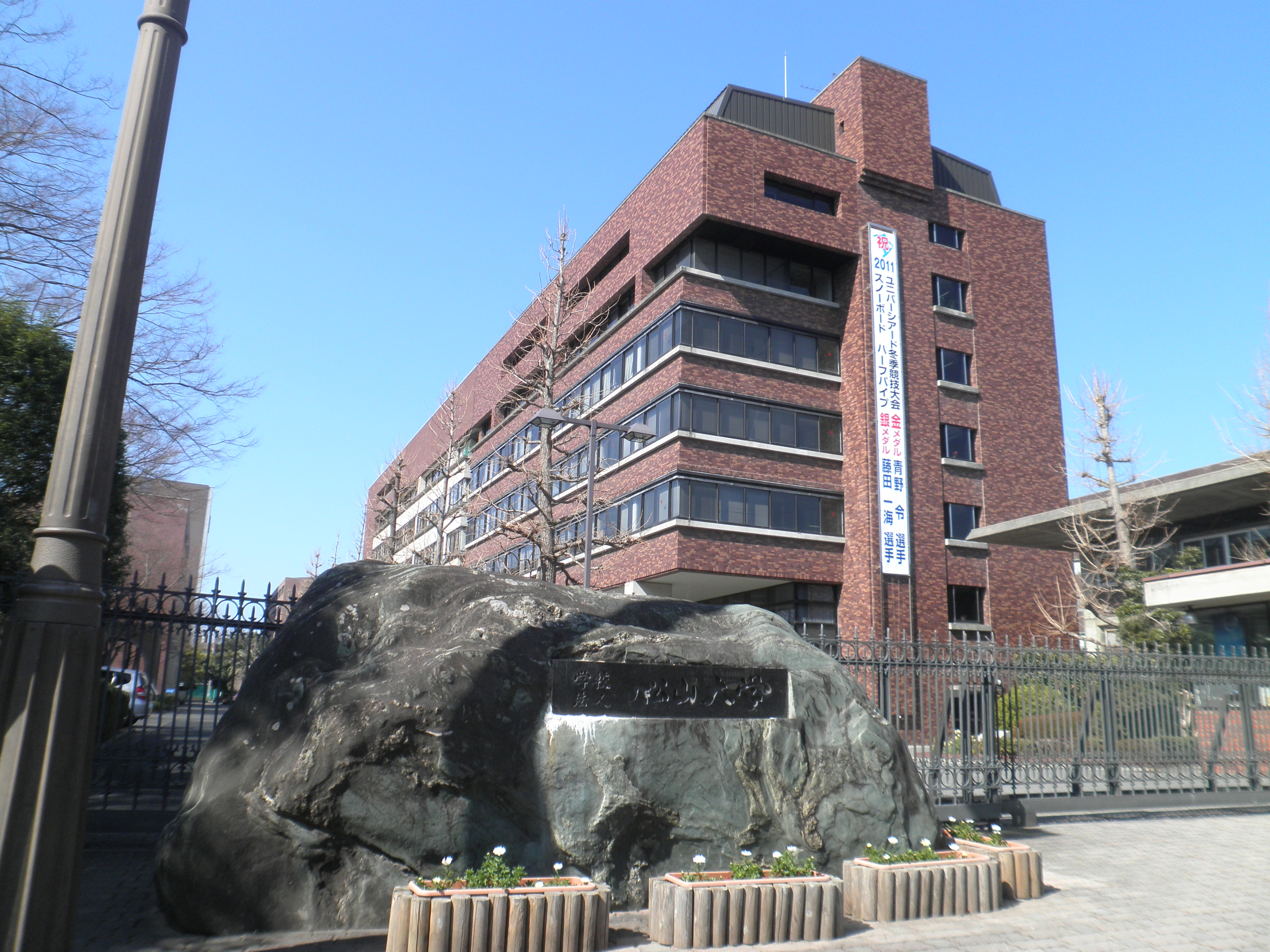
- Type: Private
- Established: 1949
- President: Hideo Arai
- Location: Matsuyama, Ehime, Japan
- Website: Official website

Matsuyama University (松山大学, Matsuyama daigaku) is a private university in Matsuyama, Ehime Prefecture, Japan. The predecessor of the school was founded in 1923, and it was chartered as a university in 1949. The present name was adopted in 1989.

== Organization ==
=== Faculties ===
- Economics
- Business Administration
- Humanities
  - English Department
  - Sociology Department
- Law

=== Graduate courses ===
- Economics
- Business Administration
- Language Communication
- Sociology
- Law
- Clinical Pharmacy

Matsuyama University also offers a six-year program through College of Pharmaceutical Sciences. In addition, evening classes are taught through Matsuyama Junior College's Commercial Department.
