= Niigata Sangyo University =

Private university in Kashiwazaki, Niigata, Japan

Coordinates: 37°20′4.2″N 138°35′34.5″E

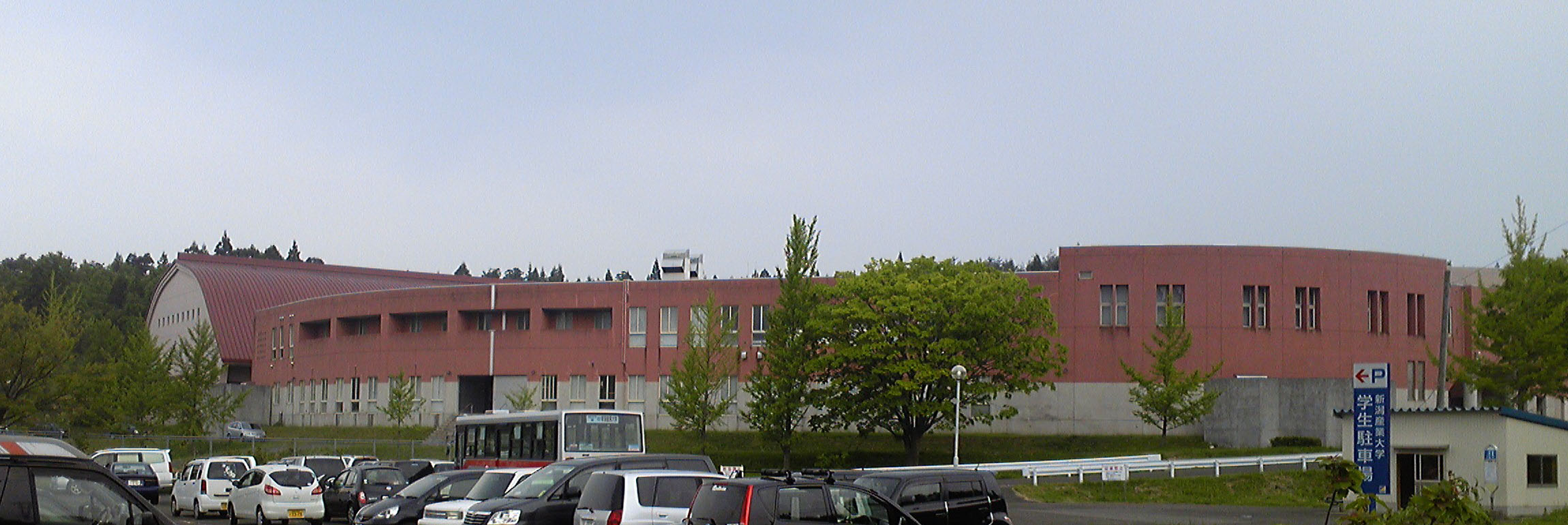
Niigata Sangyo University

Niigata Sangyo University (新潟産業大学, Niigata sangyō daigaku) is a private university in Kashiwazaki, Niigata, Japan. The predecessor of the school was founded in 1947. It was chartered as a junior college in 1950 and became a four-year college in 1988.
