= Oshima National College of Maritime Technology =

- Type: Public
- Established: 1897
- President: -
- Administrative staff: full-time, part-time
- Location: Oshima, Yamaguchi, Japan; 33°56′15″N 132°11′26″E
- Website: http://www.oshima-k.ac.jp/

Oshima National College of Maritime Technology (大島商船高等専門学校, Ōshima Shōsen Kōtō Senmon Gakkō) is one of five maritime colleges in Japan. At this college students can acquire licenses as a mariner of deck or an engineer.
