= Nakano Esperanza =

Japanese football club

Nakano Esperanza 中野エスペランサ
- Full name: Football Club Nakano Esperanza
- Founded: 16 August 1971; 53 years ago As Nakano Football Club
- Ground: Nakano-shi Multipurpose Soccer Field; Nakano, Nagano
- Capacity: 480
- Chairman: Yutaka Sakai
- Manager: Yutaka Sakai
- League: Nagano Prefectural League (Div. 1)
- 2022: 2nd of 8

Nakano Esperanza (中野エスペランサ, Nakano Esuperansa) is a football (soccer) club based in Nakano, which is located in Nagano Prefecture in Japan. As of 2022, it plays in the Nagano Prefectural League 1st Division.

== History ==
Nakano Football Club was founded in 1971: this name lasted for 29 years, before changing it again to Nagano Esperanza FC in 2001. The current denomination - Football Club Nakano Esperanza - came only in 2007, with the Spanish "Esperanza" standing for "hope" in English. The club's first logo also features Common kestrel, a type of bird that can be easily seen on Nagano Prefecture. They reached the second division of Hokushinetsu Football League in 2015, and got relegated on 2018, back to the first division of the Nakano Prefectural League. The club still hope to be in professional football on a long-term program.

On 16 August 2022, the club's 51st anniversary. Nakano Esperanza unveiled its new logo. The crest was produced and designed by Millions Co. Ltd. The rose represents the flower of Nakano City. Red-coloured, it's designed to match the club's color. The designers' intention was to make the logo simple and timeless, under the era of modern and simple logos commonly replacing older, and more detailed ones.

== Past Logos ==
used until 15 August 2022

Nakano Esperanza old logo

== League record ==
Champions	Runners-up	Third place	Promoted	Relegated

Season	League	Pos.	P	W	D	L	Pts
2008	Nagano Prefectural; League (Div. 1)	4th	9	4	2	3	14
2009	Nagano Prefectural; League (Div. 1)	3rd	9	5	3	1	18
2010	Nagano Prefectural; League (Div. 1)	3rd	9	7	0	2	21
2011	Nagano Prefectural; League (Div. 1)	2nd	9	6	2	1	20
2012	Nagano Prefectural; League (Div. 1)	6th	9	3	0	6	9
2013	Nagano Prefectural; League (Div. 1)	1st	9	9	0	0	27
2014	Nagano Prefectural; League (Div. 1)	1st	10	9	0	1	27
2015	Hokushinetsu Football; League (Div. 2)	4th	14	4	4	6	16
2016	Hokushinetsu Football; League (Div. 2)	3rd	14	8	1	5	25
2017	Hokushinetsu Football; League (Div. 2)	4th	14	7	1	6	22
2018	Hokushinetsu Football; League (Div. 2)	7th	14	3	2	9	11
2019	Nagano Prefectural; League (Div. 1)	2nd	10	5	2	3	17
2020	Nagano Prefectural; League (Div. 1)	2nd	5	4	0	1	12
2021	Nagano Prefectural; League (Div. 1)	5th	7	3	0	4	9
2022	Nagano Prefectural; League (Div. 1)	2nd	7	5	0	2	15

== Current squad ==
As of 8 October 2022.

Note: Flags indicate national team as defined under FIFA eligibility rules; some limited exceptions apply. Players may hold more than one non-FIFA nationality.

No.	Pos.	Nation	Player
1	GK	(Japan) JPN	Kairu Yamazaki
2	DF	(Japan) JPN	Yuki Tatuno
4	DF	(Japan) JPN	Takahiro Ato
5	DF	(Japan) JPN	Takuya Tanaka
6	DF	(Japan) JPN	Masaaki Yamagishi
7	MF	(Japan) JPN	Hiroki Kabaya
8	MF	(Japan) JPN	Tsukasa Maruyama
9	FW	(Japan) JPN	Daiki Sato
10	FW	(Japan) JPN	Takuya Tokutake
11	MF	(Japan) JPN	Takuma Wada

No.	Pos.	Nation	Player
14	FW	(Japan) JPN	Natsuki Takekoshi
16	MF	(Japan) JPN	Yasutaka Yoshiura
18	GK	(Japan) JPN	Kei Takizawa
19	MF	(Japan) JPN	Ryo Ito
20	DF	(Japan) JPN	Yukimi Kishida
21	DF	(Japan) JPN	Masaki Kohara
22	FW	(Japan) JPN	Yuki Tondokoro
23	GK	(Japan) JPN	Shinji Hirose
24	DF	(Japan) JPN	Yuki Takahashi (captain)
26	FW	(Japan) JPN	Kaito Azegami
