= Higashi Nippon International University =

Coordinates: 37°03′27″N 140°54′27″E

- 東日本国際大学
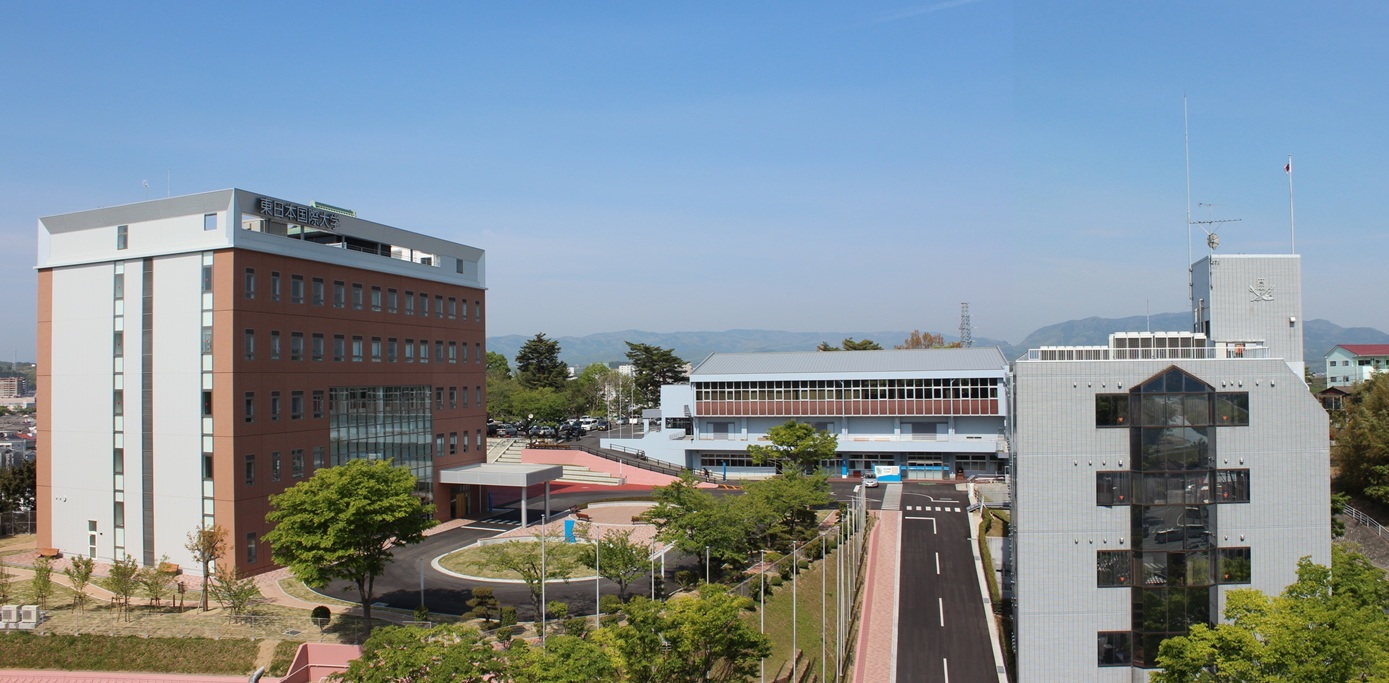
- Type: Private
- Established: 1903
- Location: Iwaki, Fukushima, Japan
- Website: http://www.shk-ac.jp/eng

Higashi Nippon International University (東日本国際大学, Higashi Nippon Kokusai Daigaku) is a private university, located in the city of Iwaki, Fukushima, Japan.

== History ==
Higashi Nippon International University was established in 1995. The predecessor of the school was founded in 1903 as the Iwaki Junior College.

== Faculties & Courses ==
- Faculty of Economic Informatics
  - Department of Economic Information Science
- School of Social & Environmental Service
  - Department of Social Welfare
- Intensive Japanese Language Course for Overseas Students
