= Nagasaki Wesleyan University =

Private university in Isahaya, Nagasaki, Japan

- 鎮西学院大学
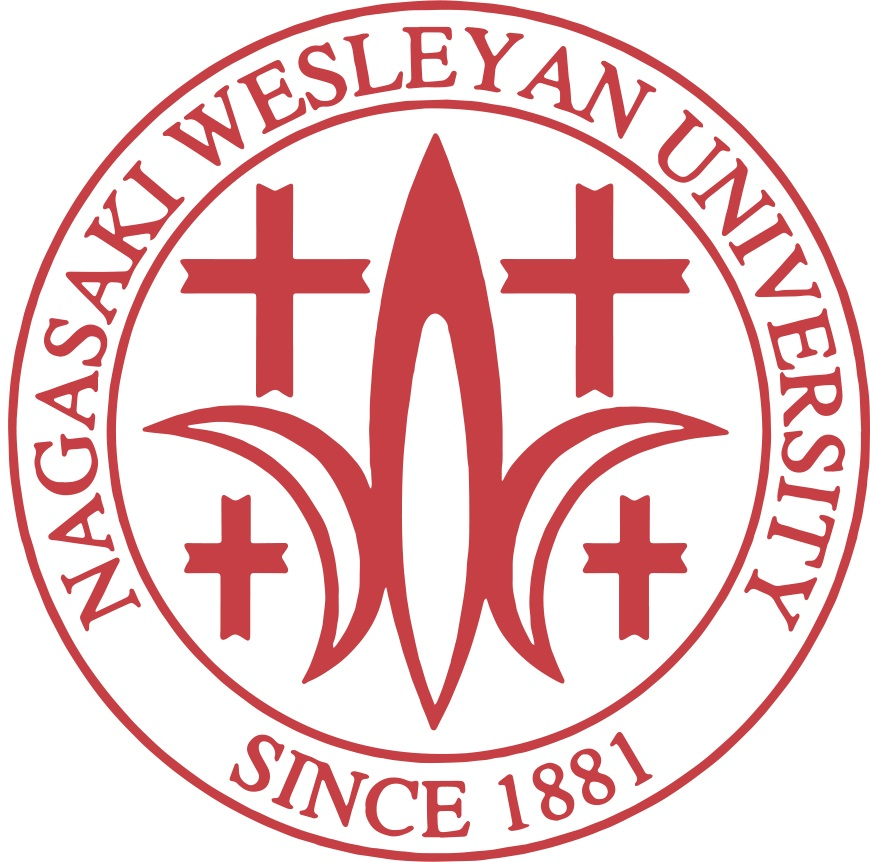
- Type: Private
- Established: 1881 (chartered 2002)
- Affiliations: Chinzei Gakuen Academy
- President: Sang-jung Kang
- Location: Isahaya, Nagasaki, Japan; 32°51′37″N 130°01′47″E
- Campus: Urban
- Website: English: Japanese:

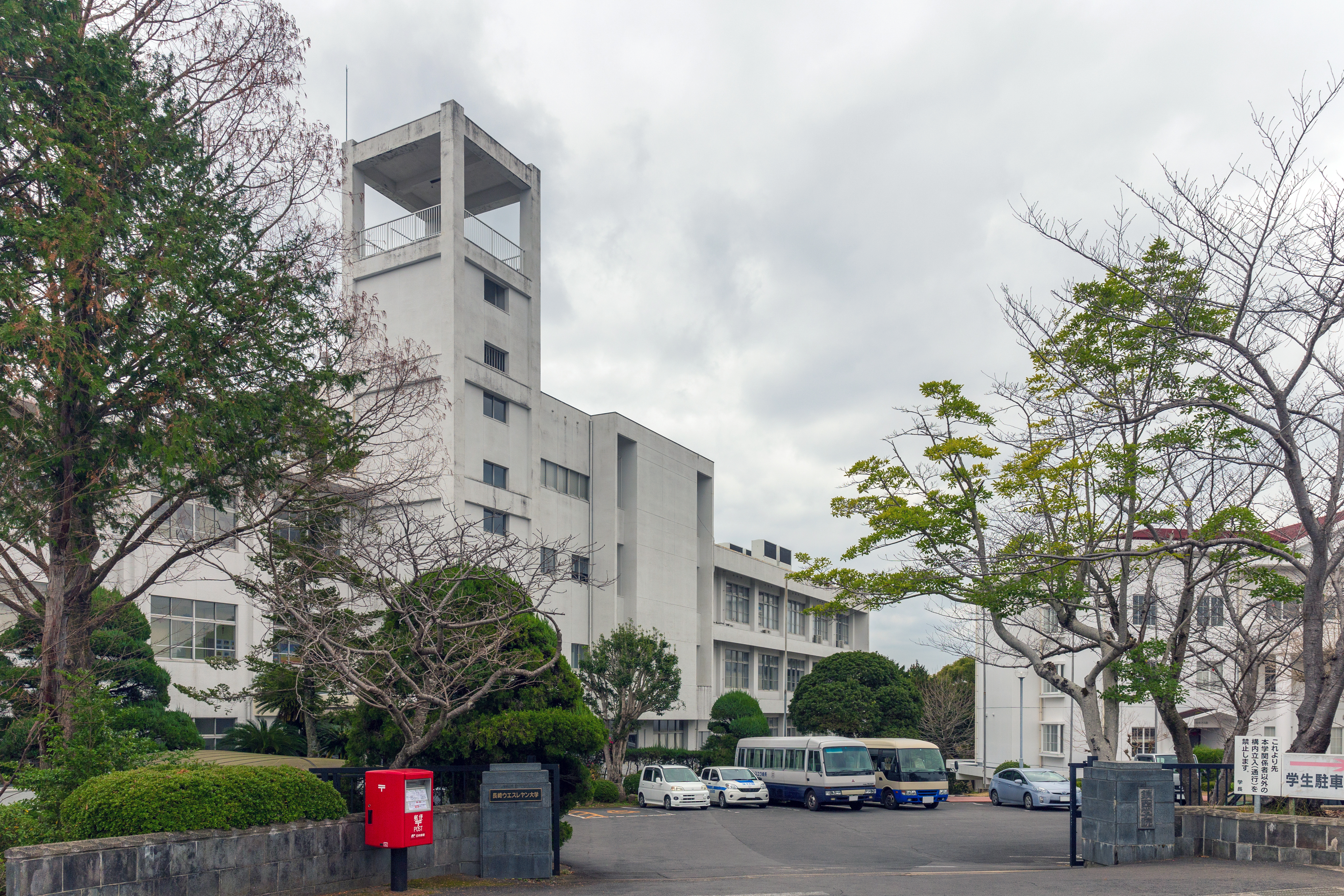
Nagasaki Wesleyan University

Nagasaki Wesleyan University (鎮西学院大学, Chinzei Gakuin daigaku) is a private university in Isahaya, Nagasaki, Japan. The predecessor of the school was the Cobleigh Seminary School founded in 1881 at Higashi-yamate in Nagasaki, which was founded as a missionary project of the Methodist Church. In 1906 the institution was renamed Chinzei Gakuin, and the institution was chartered as a junior college in 1966. In 2002 it became a four-year college. The vision that Methodist minister Dr. C.S. Long had when he began the Chinzei Academy in Nagasaki and how Methodist clergyman Dr. Chiba endeavored to rebuild the academy in Isahaya city after the academy, only 500 meters from the hypocenter, was destroyed in the bombing of Nagasaki speaks to the rich heritage of the university. The history of Nagasaki Wesleyan University and the Chinzei Academy embodies the human spirit and motivation needed for rebuilding the institute after World War II. The funding of the academy is celebrated each year in November in a festival known as the “Two-Dollar Festival”. This annual event commemorates the $2 pledge by Mollie V. Cobleigh, the widowed wife of Dr. Nelson E. Cobleigh who initiated funding for the institute. This donation of two dollars has been a commemoration honored by celebration as Nagasaki Wesleyan University calls its school festival the “Two-Dollar Festival.” In response to the spirit of Ms. Mollie V. Cobleigh’s two-dollar donation, Nagasaki Wesleyan University is active in promoting volunteer activities for young people to serve others in the community and around the world.

== International Outlook ==
The university has a distinctive international outlook. When still a junior college in the early 1980s, several teachers at the school contacted colleges and universities in the United States, the Philippines, Thailand and other countries in an effort to establish sister-school ties and promote student and faculty exchanges. A network of such ties was established, and over the years from roughly 1983 to 1999, several hundred Japanese students from Wesleyan studied abroad for a full year, while hundreds of other students transferred to foreign institutions to complete a baccalaureate degree. This transfer program was dropped when Wesleyan became a four-year institution, but still many students go abroad for exchange study, while hundreds of foreigners come to Nagasaki Wesleyan to study Japanese language and culture. Nagasaki Wesleyan University has a distinctive international outlook. A network of ties have been established with institutes around the world including the United States, Canada, the Philippines, Thailand, India, China, Malaysia, South Korea, and Brazil. Such sister-school ties promote student and faculty exchanges. Nagasaki Wesleyan University is an active participant in the Asian University Union (AU+) and has sister institute relationships with oversea partner universities. Nagasaki Wesleyan University is partners with institutes including Berjaya University College of Hospitality in Malaysia, Shandong Foreign Languages Vocational College in China, Induk University in South Korea, Kun Shan University in Taiwan, and the Don Bosco School of Management in India.
