= Okinawa University =

Private university in Naha, Okinawa, Japan

Coordinates: 26°12′03″N 127°42′00″E

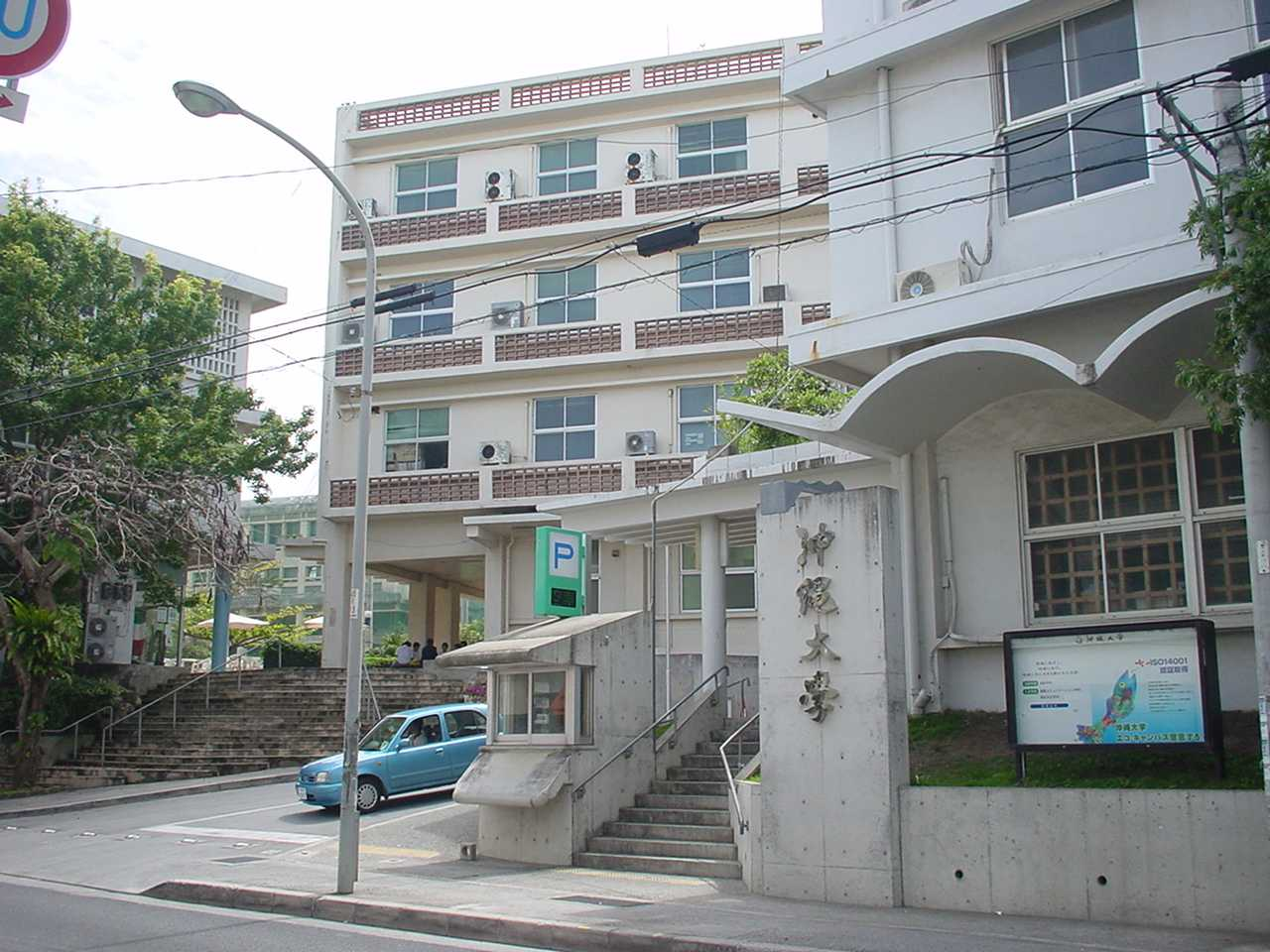
- Type: Private
- Established: 1961 (under Government of the Ryukyu Islands); 1974 (under Government of Japan)
- Location: Naha, Japan
- Website: www.okinawa-u.ac.jp

Okinawa University (沖縄大学, Okinawa daigaku) is a private university in Naha, Okinawa, Japan. The predecessor of the school was founded in 1961, and it was chartered as a university in 1974.
