= Takamatsu University =

Private university in Takamatsu, Japan

Coordinates: 34°19′45″N 134°05′14″E

- 高松大学
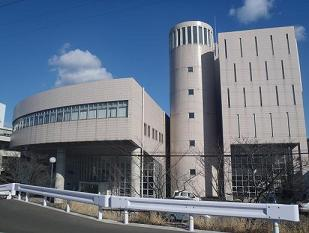
- Entrance of the Takamatsu university
- Type: Private
- Established: 1996
- Location: Takamatsu, Kagawa, Japan
- Website: Official website

Takamatsu University (高松大学, Takamatsu daigaku) is a private university in Takamatsu, Kagawa Prefecture, Japan, established in 1996. The operator of the school also runs Takamatsu Junior College.
