= Shikoku Gakuin University =

Japanese university

Coordinates: 34°13′34″N 133°46′57″E

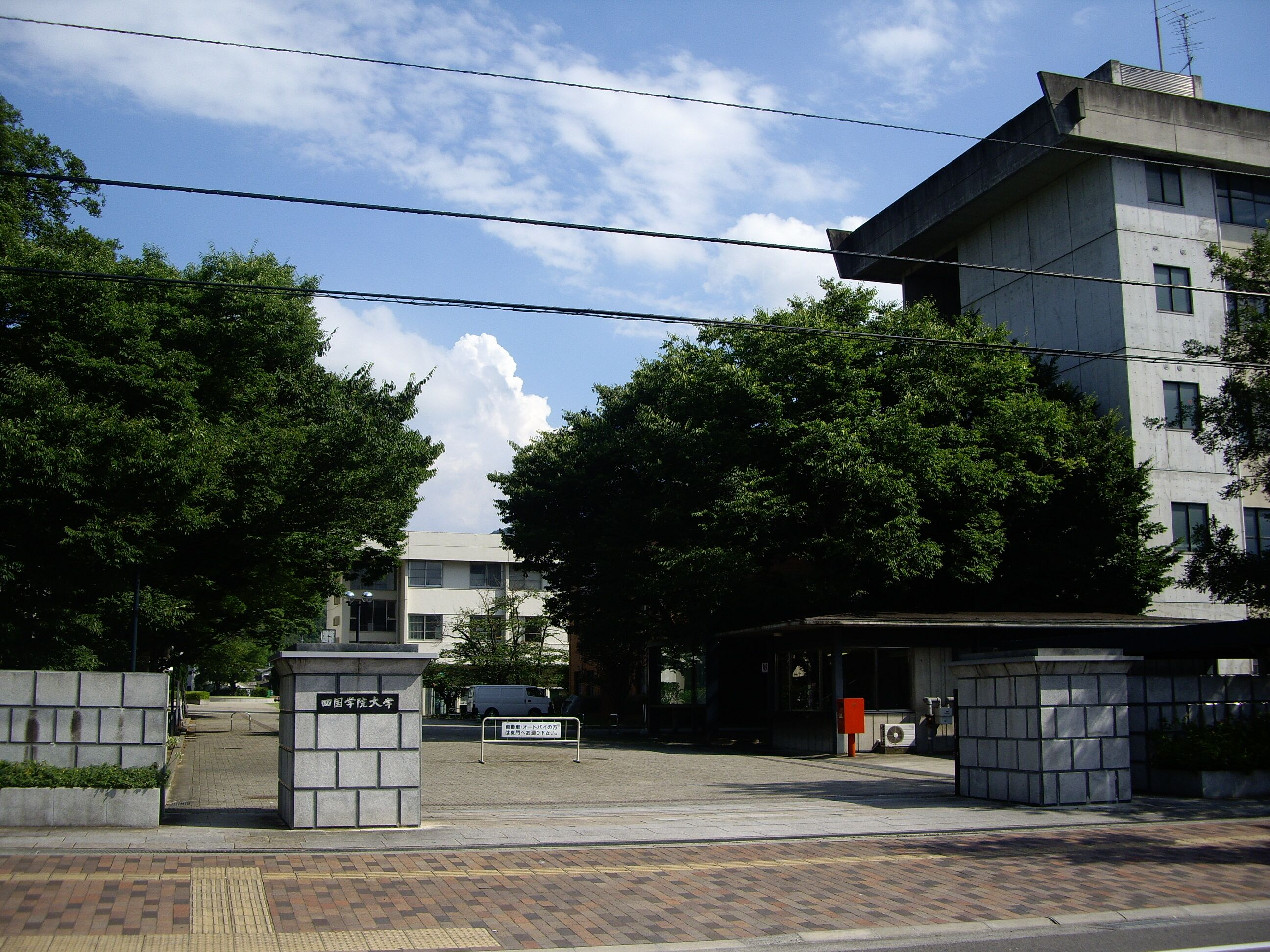
Shikoku Gakuin University

Shikoku Gakuin University (四国学院大学, Shikoku gakuin daigaku) is a private university in Zentsūji, Kagawa, Japan. The predecessor of the school was founded in 1949.
