= Matsumoto University =

Coordinates: 36°13′13.4″N 137°54′41.2″E

- 松本大学
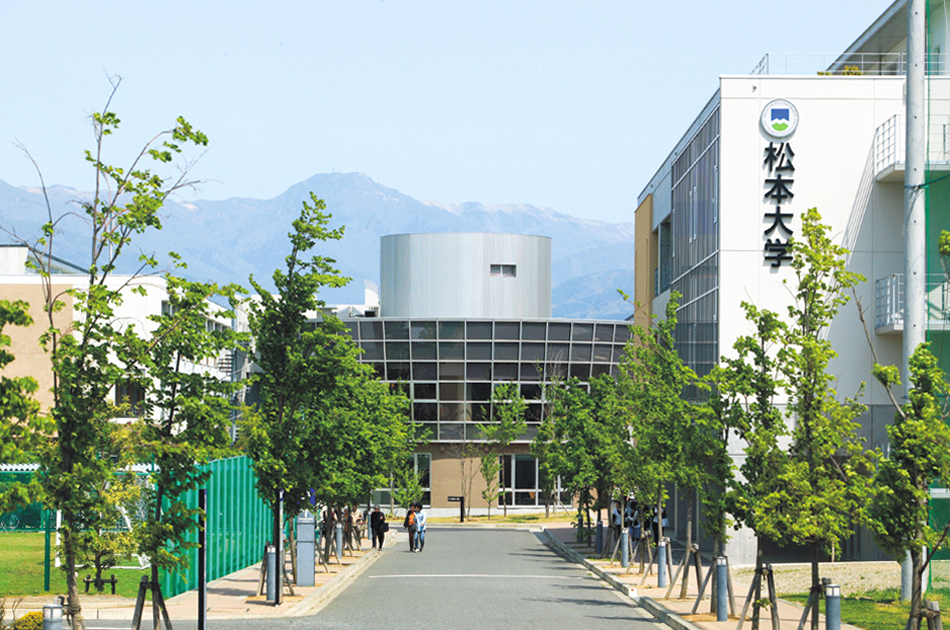
- Type: Private
- Established: 2002
- President: Hiroyuki Sumiyoshi
- Location: Matsumoto, Nagano, Japan
- Website: Official website

Matsumoto University (松本大学, Matsumoto daigaku) is a private university in Matsumoto, Nagano Prefecture, Japan, established in 2002.

== Matsusho Gakuen Junior College ==
Matsusho Gakuen Junior College (松本大学松商短期大学部, Matsumoto Daigaku Matsushō Tanki Daigakubu) is a private junior college in Matsumoto, Nagano, Japan. The junior college opened in April 1953, but the predecessor of the school was founded in 1898. It has been affiliated with Matsumoto University since 2002. It offers courses in Commerce and Management information.
