= Fukushima Medical University =

Coordinates: 37°41′21.35″N 140°28′13.41″E

- 福島県立医科大学
- Fukushima Medical University
- Type: Public
- Established: 1944
- President: Shin-ichi Kikuchi
- Location: Fukushima, Fukushima, Japan
- Website: http://www.fmu.ac.jp/ Fukushima Medical University

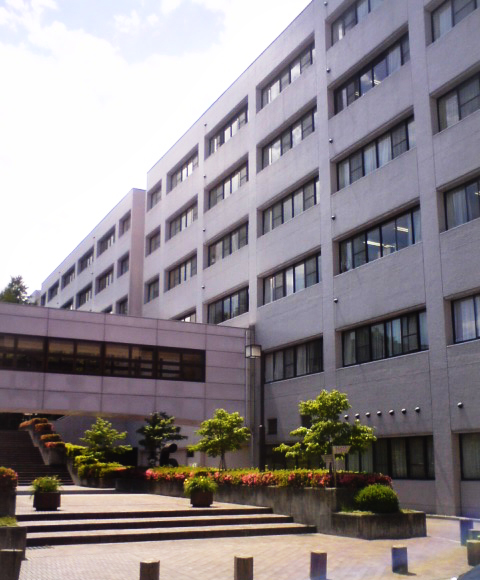
Fukushima Medical University

Fukushima Medical University (福島県立医科大学, Fukushima kenritsu ika daigaku) is a public university, located in the city of Fukushima, Japan.

== History ==
The predecessor of the school was Fukushima Woman's Medical School and was established in 1944. It was chartered as a university in 1950.

== Academic Departments and Facilities ==
- School of Medicine - offers undergraduate medical education.
- School of Nursing - founded in 1988 to offer undergraduate nursing education (BSN).
- School of Graduate Education - graduate programs in medicine and nursing.
- Fukushima Medical University Hospital - 778-bed acute care hospital.
- Radiation Medical Science Center - Founded in 2011 after Great East Japan Earthquake and subsequent Fukushima Daiichi nuclear plant accident.
