= Niigata University of Management =

Private university in Japan

Coordinates: 37°40′18.9″N 139°3′53.8″E

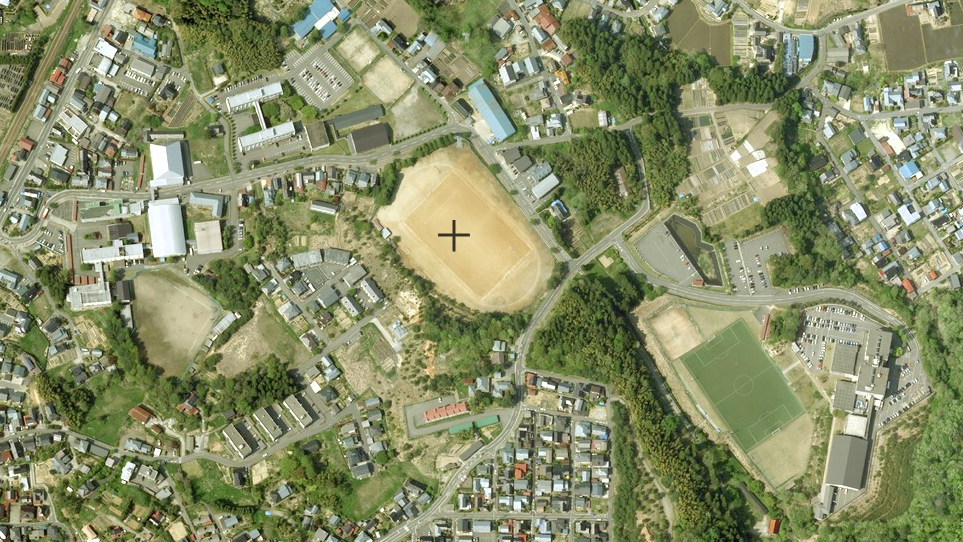
Niigata University of Management

Niigata University of Management (新潟経営大学, Niigata keiei daigaku) is a private university in Kamo, Niigata, Japan. It was established in 1994.
