= List of universities in Japan =

List on the Wikimedia project

The following is a comprehensive list of universities in Japan, categorized by prefecture.

The list contains only universities that still exist today and are classified as "schools" according to Article 1 of the School Education Law. (See Daigakkō for universities that are not considered "schools".) Also, each university or college is listed in the prefecture in which its headquarters is located, not the location of their satellite campuses, etc. or that of some of its departments or divisions. For the list of universities that existed in the past or merged into another school, see List of historical universities in Japan.

== By prefecture ==
List is sourced from the Ministry of Education, Culture, Sports, Science and Technology's website.

=== Aichi ===
- Aichi Bunkyo University
- Aichi Gakuin University
- Aichi Gakusen University
- Aichi Institute of Technology
- Aichi Medical University
- Aichi Mizuho College
- Aichi Prefectural University
- Aichi Sangyo University
- Aichi Shukutoku University
- Aichi Toho University
- Aichi University
- Aichi University of Education
- Aichi University of Technology
- Aichi University of The Arts
- Chubu University
- Chukyo University
- Daido University
- Doho University
- Fujita Health University
- Ichinomiya Kenshin College
- International Professional University of Technology in Nagoya
- Japanese Red Cross Toyota College of Nursing
- Kinjo Gakuin University
- Meijo University
- Nagoya Bunri University
- Nagoya City University
- Nagoya College of Music
- Nagoya Gakuin University
- Nagoya Institute of Technology
- Nagoya Ryujo Women's University
- Nagoya Sangyo University
- Nagoya University
- Nagoya University of Arts and Sciences
- Nagoya University of Commerce & Business
- Nagoya University of Economics
- Nagoya University of Foreign Studies
- Nagoya University of The Arts
- Nagoya Women's University
- Nagoya Zokei University of Art & Design
- Nanzan University
- Nihon Fukushi University
- Ohkagakuen University
- Okazaki Women's University
- Seijoh University
- Shigakkan University
- Shubun University
- Sugiyama Jogakuen University
- Tokai Gakuen University
- Toyohashi Sozo University
- Toyohashi University of Technology
- Toyota Technological Institute
- University of Human Environments

=== Akita ===
- Akita International University
- Akita Prefectural University
- Akita University
- Akita University of Art
- Akita University of Nursing and Welfare
- Japanese Red Cross Tohoku College of Nursing
- North Asia University

=== Aomori ===
- Aomori Chuo Gakuin University
- Aomori Public University
- Aomori University
- Aomori University of Health and Welfare
- Hachinohe Gakuin University
- Hachinohe Institute of Technology
- Hirosaki Gakuin University
- Hirosaki University
- Hirosaki University of Health and Welfare
- Shibata Gakuen University

=== Chiba ===
- Aikoku Gakuen University
- Chiba Institute of Science
- Chiba Institute of Technology
- Chiba Keizai University
- Chiba Prefectural University of Health Sciences
- Chiba University
- Chiba University of Commerce
- Chuo Gakuin University
- Edogawa University
- International Budo University
- Josai International University
- Kaichi International University
- Kameda University of Health Sciences
- Kanda University of International Studies
- Kawamura Gakuen Woman's University
- Keiai University
- Reitaku University
- Ryotokuji University
- Saniku Gakuin College
- Seitoku University
- Seiwa University
- Shukutoku University
- Shumei University
- Tokyo Christian University
- Tokyo University of Information Sciences
- Uekusa Gakuen University
- Wayo Women's University

=== Ehime ===
- Ehime Prefectural University of Health Sciences
- Ehime University
- Matsuyama Shinonome College
- Matsuyama University
- St.Catherine University

=== Fukui ===
- Fukui Health Science University
- Fukui Prefectural University
- Fukui University of Technology
- Jin-ai University
- Tsuruga Nursing University
- University of Fukui

=== Fukuoka ===
- Chikushi Jogakuen University
- College of Healthcare Management
- Cyber University
- Daiichi University of Pharmacy
- Fukuoka Dental College
- Fukuoka Institute of Technology
- Fukuoka International University of Health and Welfare
- Fukuoka Jo Gakuin Nursing University
- Fukuoka Jo Gakuin University
- Fukuoka Nursing College
- Fukuoka Prefectural University
- Fukuoka University
- Fukuoka Women's University
- Japan University of Economics
- Japanese Red Cross Kyushu International College of Nursing
- Junshin Gakuen University
- Kurume Institute of Technology
- Kurume University
- Kyushu Dental University
- Kyushu Institute of Information Sciences
- Kyushu Institute of Technology
- Kyushu International University
- Kyushu Kyoritsu University
- Kyushu Nutrition Welfare University
- Kyushu Sangyo University
- Kyushu University
- Kyushu Women's University
- Nakamura Gakuen University
- Nishinippon Institute of Technology
- Seinan Gakuin University
- Seinan Jo Gakuin University
- St. Mary’s College
- The University of Kitakyushu
- University of Occupational and Environmental Health, Japan
- University of Teacher Education Fukuoka

=== Fukushima ===
- Fukushima College
- Fukushima Medical University
- Fukushima University
- Higashi Nippon International University
- Iryo Sosei University
- Koriyama Women's University
- Ohu University
- The University of Aizu

=== Gifu ===
- Asahi University
- Chubu Gakuin University
- Chukyo Gakuin University
- Gifu College of Nursing
- Gifu Kyoritsu University
- Gifu Pharmaceutical University
- Gifu Shotoku Gakuen University
- Gifu University
- Gifu University of Health Sciences
- Gifu University of Medical Science
- Gifu Women's University
- Institute of Advanced Media Arts and Sciences
- Tokai Gakuin University

=== Gunma ===
- Gunma Paz University
- Gunma Prefectural College of Health Sciences
- Gunma Prefectural Women's University
- Gunma University
- Gunma University of Health and Welfare
- Ikuei University
- Jobu University
- Kanto Gakuen University
- Kiryu University
- Kyoai Gakuen University
- Maebashi Institute of Technology
- Takasaki City University of Economics
- Takasaki University of Commerce
- Takasaki University of Health and Welfare
- Tokyo University of Social Welfare

=== Hiroshima ===
- Eikei University of Hiroshima
- Elisabeth University of Music
- Fukuyama City University
- Fukuyama Heisei University
- Fukuyama University
- Hijiyama University
- Hiroshima Bunka Gakuen University
- Hiroshima Bunkyo University
- Hiroshima City University
- Hiroshima Cosmopolitan University
- Hiroshima Institute of Technology
- Hiroshima International University
- Hiroshima Jogakuin University
- Hiroshima Kokusai Gakuin University
- Hiroshima Shudo University
- Hiroshima University
- Hiroshima University of Economics
- Japanese Red Cross Hiroshima College of Nursing
- Onomichi City University
- Prefectural University of Hiroshima
- Yasuda Women's University

=== Hokkaido ===
- Asahikawa City University
- Asahikawa Medical University
- Chitose Institute of Science and Technology
- Fuji Women's University
- Future University Hakodate
- Hakodate University
- Health Sciences University of Hokkaido
- Hokkai-Gakuen University
- Hokkai School of Commerce
- Hokkaido Bunkyo University
- Hokkaido Chitose College of Rehabilitation
- Hokkaido Information University
- Hokkaido University
- Hokkaido University of Education
- Hokkaido University of Science
- Hokusei Gakuen University
- Hokusho University
- Hokuyo University
- Japan Health Care College
- Japanese Red Cross Hokkaido College of Nursing
- Kitami Institute of Technology
- Kushiro Public University of Economics
- Muroran Institute of Technology
- Nayoro City University
- Obihiro University of Agriculture and Veterinary Medicine
- Otaru University of Commerce
- Rakuno Gakuen University
- Sapporo City University
- Sapporo Gakuin University
- Sapporo International University
- Sapporo Medical University
- Sapporo Otani University
- Sapporo University
- Sapporo University of Health Sciences
- Seisa Dohto University
- Tenshi College
- Wakkanai Hokusei Gakuen University

=== Hyogo ===
- Ashiya University
- Himeji Dokkyo University
- Himeji University
- Hyogo College of Medicine
- Hyogo University
- Hyogo University of Health Sciences
- Hyogo University of Teacher Education
- Kansai University of International Studies
- Kansai University of Nursing and Health Sciences
- Kansai University of Social Welfare
- Kobe City College of Nursing
- Kobe City University of Foreign Studies
- Kobe College
- Kobe Design University
- Kobe Gakuin University
- Kobe Institute of Computing
- Kobe International University
- Kobe Kaisei College
- Kobe Pharmaceutical University
- Kobe Shinwa Women's University
- Kobe Shoin Women's University
- Kobe Tokiwa University
- Kobe University
- Kobe University of Welfare
- Kobe Women's University
- Konan University
- Konan Women's University
- Koshien University
- Kwansei Gakuin University
- Mukogawa Women's University
- Otemae University
- Professional College of Arts and Tourism
- Sonoda Women's University
- Takarazuka University of Medical and Health Care
- University of Hyogo
- University of Marketing and Distribution Sciences

=== Ibaraki ===
- Ibaraki Christian University
- Ibaraki Prefectural University of Health Sciences
- Ibaraki University
- Nihon Wellness Sports University
- Ryutsu Keizai University
- Tokiwa University
- Tsukuba Gakuin University
- Tsukuba International University
- Tsukuba University of Technology
- University of Tsukuba

=== Ishikawa ===
- Hokuriku University
- Hokuriku Gakuin University
- Ishikawa Prefectural Nursing University
- Ishikawa Prefectural University
- Japan Advanced Institute of Science And Technology
- Kanazawa College of Art
- Kanazawa Gakuin University
- Kanazawa Institute of Technology
- Kanazawa Medical University
- Kanazawa Professional University of Food Management
- Kanazawa Seiryo University
- Kanazawa University
- Kinjo University
- Komatsu University

=== Iwate ===
- Fuji University
- Iwate Medical University
- Iwate Prefectural University
- Iwate University
- Iwate University of Health and Medical Sciences
- Morioka University

=== Kagawa ===
- Kagawa Prefectural University of Health Sciences
- Kagawa University
- Shikoku Gakuin University
- Takamatsu University

=== Kagoshima ===
- Daiichi Institute of Technology
- Kagoshima Immaculate Heart University
- Kagoshima University
- National Institute of Fitness and Sports in Kanoya
- Shigakukan University
- The International University of Kagoshima

=== Kanagawa ===
- Azabu University
- Den-en Chofu University
- Ferris University
- Institute of Information Security
- Japan Institute of the Moving Image
- Kamakura Women's University
- Kanagawa Dental University
- Kanagawa Institute of Technology
- Kanagawa University
- Kanagawa University of Human Services
- Kanto Gakuin University
- Sagami Women's University
- Seisa University
- Senzoku Gakuen College of Music
- Shoin University
- Shonan Institute of Technology
- Shonan Kamakura University of Medical Sciences
- Shonan University of Medical Sciences
- Showa University of Music
- St. Marianna University School of Medicine
- The Graduate University for Advanced Studies, SOKENDAI
- Toin University of Yokohama
- Tokai University
- Toyo Eiwa University
- Tsurumi University
- Yashima Gakuen University
- Yokohama City University
- Yokohama College of Commerce
- Yokohama National University
- Yokohama Soei University
- Yokohama University of Art and Design
- Yokohama University of Pharmacy

=== Kochi ===
- Kochi Gakuen University
- Kochi Professional University of Rehabilitation
- Kochi University
- Kochi University of Technology
- University of Kochi

=== Kumamoto ===
- Heisei College of Music
- Kumamoto Gakuen University
- Kumamoto Health Science University
- Kumamoto University
- Kyushu Lutheran College
- Kyushu University of Nursing and Social Welfare
- Prefectural University of Kumamoto
- Shokei University
- Sojo University

=== Kyoto ===
- Bukkyo University
- Doshisha University
- Doshisha Women's College of Liberal Arts
- Hanazono University
- Heian Jogakuin (St. Agnes') University
- Kyoto Pharmaceutical University
- Kyoto Arts and Crafts University
- Kyoto Bunkyo University
- Kyoto City University of Arts
- Kyoto College of Medical Science
- Kyoto College of Nursing
- Kyoto Institute of Technology
- Kyoto Kacho University
- Kyoto Koka Women's University
- Kyoto Notre Dame University
- Kyoto Prefectural University
- Kyoto Prefectural University of Medicine
- Kyoto Saga University of Arts
- Kyoto Sangyo University
- Kyoto Seika University
- Kyoto Tachibana University
- Kyoto University
- Kyoto University of Advanced Science
- Kyoto University of Education
- Kyoto University of Foreign Studies
- Kyoto University of the Arts
- Kyoto Women's University
- Meiji University of Integrative Medicine
- Otani University
- Ritsumeikan University
- Ryukoku University
- Shuchiin University
- The Kyoto College of Graduate Studies for Informatics
- The University of Fukuchiyama

=== Mie ===
- Kogakkan University
- Mie Prefectural College of Nursing
- Mie University
- Suzuka University
- Suzuka University of Medical Science
- Yokkaichi Nursing and Medical Care University
- Yokkaichi University

=== Miyagi ===
- Ishinomaki Senshu University
- Miyagi Akita Prefectural University
- Miyagi Gakuin Women's University
- Miyagi University of Education
- Sendai Shirayuri Women's College
- Sendai University
- Shokei Gakuin University
- Tohoku Bunka Gakuen University
- Tohoku Fukushi University
- Tohoku Gakuin University
- Tohoku Institute of Technology
- Tohoku Medical and Pharmaceutical University
- Tohoku Seikatsu Bunka University
- Tohoku University

=== Miyazaki ===
- Kyushu University of Health and Welfare
- Minami Kyushu University
- Miyazaki International College
- Miyazaki Municipal University
- Miyazaki Prefectural Nursing University
- Miyazaki Sangyo-keiei University
- University of Miyazaki

=== Nagano ===
- Matsumoto College of Nursing
- Matsumoto Dental University
- Matsumoto University
- Nagano College of Nursing
- Nagano University
- Nagano University of Health and Medicine
- Saku University
- Seisen Jogakuin College
- Shinshu University
- Suwa University of Science
- The University of Nagano

=== Nagasaki ===
- Kwassui Women's University
- Nagasaki Institute of Applied Science
- Nagasaki International University
- Nagasaki Junshin Catholic University
- Nagasaki University
- Nagasaki University of Foreign Studies
- Nagasaki Wesleyan University
- University of Nagasaki

=== Nara ===
- Kio University
- Nara Institute of Science and Technology
- Nara Medical University
- Nara Prefectural University
- Nara University
- Nara University of Education
- Nara Women's University
- Naragakuen University
- Tenri Health Care University
- Tenri University
- Tezukayama University

=== Niigata ===
- Graduate Institute for Entrepreneurial Studies
- International University of Japan
- Joetsu University of Education
- Kaishi Professional University
- Keiwa College
- Nagaoka Institute of Design
- Nagaoka Sutoku University
- Nagaoka University
- Nagaoka University of Technology
- Niigata Agro-Food University
- Niigata College of Nursing
- Niigata Institute of Technology
- Niigata Sangyo University
- Niigata Seiryo University
- Niigata University
- Niigata University of Health and Welfare
- Niigata University of International and Information Studies
- Niigata University of Management
- Niigata University of Pharmacy and Applied Life Sciences
- Niigata University of Rehabilitation
- Sanjo City University
- University of Niigata Prefecture

=== Oita ===
- Beppu University
- Nippon Bunri University
- Oita University
- Oita University of Nursing and Health Sciences
- Ritsumeikan Asia Pacific University

=== Okayama ===
- Chugoku Gakuen University
- International Pacific University
- Kawasaki Medical School
- Kawasaki University of Medical Welfare
- Kibi International University
- Kurashiki Sakuyo University
- Kurashiki University of Science and the Arts
- Mimasaka University
- Niimi University
- Notre Dame Seishin University
- Okayama Gakuin University
- Okayama Healthcare Professional University
- Okayama Prefectural University
- Okayama Shoka University
- Okayama University
- Okayama University of Science
- Sanyo Gakuen University
- Shujitsu University

=== Okinawa ===
- Meio University
- Okinawa Christian University
- Okinawa Institute of Science and Technology Graduate University
- Okinawa International University
- Okinawa Prefectural College of Nursing
- Okinawa Prefectural University of Arts
- Okinawa University
- University of the Ryukyus

=== Osaka ===
- Aino University
- Baika Women's University
- Butsuryo College of Osaka
- Hagoromo University of International Studies
- Hannan University
- Higashiosaka College
- International Professional University of Technology in Osaka
- Jikei University of Health Care Sciences
- Kansai Gaidai University
- Kansai Medical University
- Kansai University
- Kansai University of Health Sciences
- Kansai University of Welfare Sciences
- Kindai University
- Momoyama Gakuin University
- Momoyama Gakuin University of Education
- Morinomiya University of Medical Sciences
- Osaka Aoyama University
- Osaka City University
- Osaka College of Music
- Osaka Dental University
- Osaka Electro-Communication University
- Osaka Gakuin University
- Osaka Health Science University
- Osaka Institute of Technology
- Osaka International University
- Osaka Jogakuin University
- Osaka Kawasaki Rehabilitation University
- Osaka Kyoiku University
- Osaka Medical and Pharmaceutical University
- Osaka Ohtani University
- Osaka Prefecture University
- Osaka Sangyo University
- Osaka Seikei University
- Osaka Shoin Women's University
- Osaka University
- Osaka University of Arts
- Osaka University of Commerce
- Osaka University of Comprehensive Children Education
- Osaka University of Economics
- Osaka University of Economics and Law
- Osaka University of Health and Sport Sciences
- Osaka University of Human Sciences
- Osaka University of Tourism
- Osaka Yukioka College of Health Science
- Otemon Gakuin University
- Senri Kinran University
- Setsunan University
- Shijonawate Gakuen University
- Shitennoji University
- Soai University
- Taisei Gakuin University
- Takarazuka University
- Tezukayama Gakuin University
- Tokiwakai Gakuen University
- Yamato University

=== Saga ===
- Nishikyushu University
- Saga University

=== Saitama ===
- Bunri University of Hospitality
- Dokkyo University
- Heisei International University
- Institute of Technologists
- Japan University of Health Sciences
- Josai University
- Jumonji University
- Kagawa Nutrition University
- Kyoei University
- Meikai University
- Musashino Gakuin University
- Nihon Institute of Medical Science
- Nihon Pharmaceutical University
- Nippon Institute of Technology
- Saitama Gakuen University
- Saitama Institute of Technology
- Saitama Medical University
- Saitama Prefectural University
- Saitama University
- Seigakuin University
- Shobi University
- Surugadai University
- Toho College of Music
- Tohto University
- Tokyo International University
- University of Human Arts and Sciences
- Urawa University

=== Shiga ===
- Biwako Professional University of Rehabilitation
- Biwako Seikei Sport College
- Biwako-Gakuin University
- Nagahama Institute of Bio-Science and Technology
- Seian University of Art And Design
- Seisen University
- Shiga University
- Shiga University of Medical Science
- The University of Shiga Prefecture

=== Shimane ===
- Shimane University
- The University of Shimane

=== Shizuoka ===
- Hamamatsu Gakuin University
- Hamamatsu University School of Medicine
- Seirei Christopher University
- Shizuoka Eiwa Gakuin University
- Shizuoka Graduate University of Public Health
- Shizuoka Institute of Science and Technology
- Shizuoka Professional University of Agriculture
- Shizuoka Sangyo University
- Shizuoka University
- Shizuoka University of Art and Culture
- Shizuoka University of Welfare
- The Graduate School for the Creation of New Photonics Industries
- Tokoha University
- University of Shizuoka

=== Tochigi ===
- Ashikaga University
- Bunsei University of Art
- Dokkyo Medical University
- Hakuoh University
- International University of Health And Welfare
- Jichi Medical University
- Sakushin Gakuin University
- Utsunomiya Kyowa University
- Utsunomiya University

=== Tokushima ===
- Naruto University of Education
- Shikoku University
- Tokushima Bunri University
- Tokushima University

=== Tokyo ===
- Advanced Institute of Industrial Technology
- Aoyama Gakuin University
- Asia University
- Atomi University
- Bunka Fashion Graduate University
- Bunka Gakuen University
- Bunkyo Gakuin University
- Bunkyo University
- Business Breakthrough University
- Chuo University
- Daito Bunka University
- Digital Hollywood University
- Gakushuin University
- Gakushuin Women's College
- Graduate School of Leadership and Innovation, Shizenkan University
- Graduate School of Management, GLOBIS University
- Hitotsubashi University
- Hollywood Graduate School of Beauty Business
- Hosei University
- Hosen College of Childhood Education
- Hoshi University
- Institute of Science Tokyo (former: Tokyo Institute of Technology and Tokyo Medical and Dental University)
- International Christian University
- International College for Postgraduate Buddhist Studies
- International Professional University of Technology in Tokyo
- J. F. Oberlin University
- Japan College of Social Work
- Japan Lutheran College
- Japan Women's College of Physical Education
- Japan Women's University
- Japanese Red Cross College of Nursing
- Jissen Women's University
- Joshibi University of Art and Design
- Juntendo University
- Kaetsu University
- Keio University
- Keisen University
- Kitasato University
- Kogakuin University
- Kokugakuin University
- Kokushikan University
- Komazawa University
- Komazawa Women's University
- Kunitachi College of Music
- Kyorin University
- Kyoritsu Women's University
- LEC Graduate University
- Meiji Gakuin University
- Meiji Pharmaceutical University
- Meiji University
- Meisei University
- Mejiro University
- Musashi University
- Musashino Academia Musicae
- Musashino Art University
- Musashino University
- National Graduate Institute for Policy Studies
- Nihon Bunka University
- Nihon University
- Nippon Medical School
- Nippon Sport Science University
- Nippon Veterinary and Life Science University
- Nishogakusha University
- Ochanomizu University
- Ohara Graduate School of Accounting
- Otsuma Women's University
- Professional Institute of International Fashion
- Professional University of Information and Management for Innovation
- Rikkyo University
- Rissho University
- Sanno University
- SBI Graduate School
- Seijo University
- Seikei University
- Seisen University
- Senshu University
- Shibaura Institute of Technology
- Shiraume Gakuen University
- Shirayuri University
- Showa Pharmaceutical University
- Showa University
- Showa Women’s University
- Soka University
- Sophia University
- St. Luke's International University
- Sugino Fashion College
- Taisho University
- Takachiho University
- Takushoku University
- Tama Art University
- Tama University
- Tamagawa University
- Temple University, Japan Campus
- Teikyo Heisei University
- Teikyo University
- Teikyo University of Science
- The Graduate School of Project Design
- The Graduate School of Social Design
- The Jikei University School of Medicine
- The Nippon Dental University
- The University of Electro-Communications
- The University of Tokyo
- Toho Gakuen School of Music
- Toho University
- Tokyo Ariake University of Medical and Health Sciences
- Tokyo City University
- Tokyo College of Music
- Tokyo Denki University
- Tokyo Dental College
- Tokyo Fuji University
- Tokyo Future University
- Tokyo Gakugei University
- Tokyo Healthcare University
- Tokyo Junshin University
- Tokyo Kasei Gakuin University
- Tokyo Kasei University
- Tokyo Keizai University
- Tokyo Medical University
- Tokyo Metropolitan University
- Tokyo Online University
- Tokyo Polytechnic University
- Tokyo Professional University of Health Sciences
- Tokyo Seiei College
- Tokyo Seitoku University
- Tokyo Union Theological Seminary
- Tokyo University of Agriculture
- Tokyo University of Agriculture and Technology
- Tokyo University of Foreign Studies
- Tokyo University of Marine Science and Technology
- Tokyo University of Pharmacy and Life Sciences
- Tokyo University of Science
- Tokyo University of Technology
- Tokyo University of the Arts
- Tokyo Woman's Christian University
- Tokyo Women's College of Physical Education
- Tokyo Women's Medical University
- Tokyo Zokei University
- Toyo Gakuen University
- Toyo University
- Tsuda University
- Ueno Gakuen University
- University of The Sacred Heart, Tokyo
- University of Tokyo Health Sciences
- Wako University
- Waseda University
- Yamazaki University of Animal Health Technology

=== Tottori ===
- Tottori College of Nursing
- Tottori University
- Tottori University of Environmental Studies

=== Toyama ===
- Takaoka University of Law
- Toho Gakuen Graduate School
- Toyama Prefectural University
- Toyama University of International Studies
- University of Toyama

=== Wakayama ===
- Koyasan University
- Wakayama Medical University
- Wakayama Professional University of Rehabilitation
- Wakayama Shin-ai University
- Wakayama University

=== Yamagata ===
- Tohoku Bunkyo College
- Tohoku University of Art & Design
- Tohoku University of Community Service and Science
- Yamagata Prefectural University of Health Sciences
- Yamagata Prefectural Yonezawa University of Nutrition Sciences
- Yamagata University

=== Yamaguchi ===
- Baiko Gakuin University
- Sanyo-Onoda City University
- Shimonoseki City University
- Shiseikan University
- The University of East Asia
- Tokuyama University
- Ube Frontier University
- Yamaguchi Gakugei University
- Yamaguchi Prefectural University
- Yamaguchi University

=== Yamanashi ===
- Health Science University
- Minobusan University
- Tsuru University
- University of Yamanashi
- Yamanashi Eiwa College
- Yamanashi Gakuin University
- Yamanashi Prefectural University

== See also ==
- Higher education in Japan
- List of current and historical women's universities and colleges in Japan
- List of junior colleges in Japan
- List of national universities in Japan
- List of public universities in Japan
- Lists of universities and colleges
- Lists of universities and colleges by country
- National University Corporation
- National Seven Universities
