= List of historical universities in Japan =

The following is a comprehensive list of universities in Japan that existed in the past. For the list of universities that still exist today, see list of universities in Japan.

- Fuji Phoenix College
- Kanagawa Prefectural College Nursing Medical Technology Public Health
- Kanagawa Prefectural Junior College of Nutrition
- Kanto Gakuin Women's Junior College
- Kobe University of Mercantile Marine
- Kugayama University
- Kyoto College of Art, now part of Kyoto Gakuen University
- Nagano Prefectural College, now part of The University of Nagano
- Saga Art College, now part of Kyoto Saga University of Arts
- Seian College of Art and Design, now part of Osaka Seikei University
- Showa University College of Medical Sciences
