= Nagadai =

Nagadai may refer to:

- Nagano University
- Nagaoka University
