= Minami-Kokura Station =

Railway station in Kitakyushu, Japan

JF 03 JI 03 Minami-Kokura Station 南小倉駅
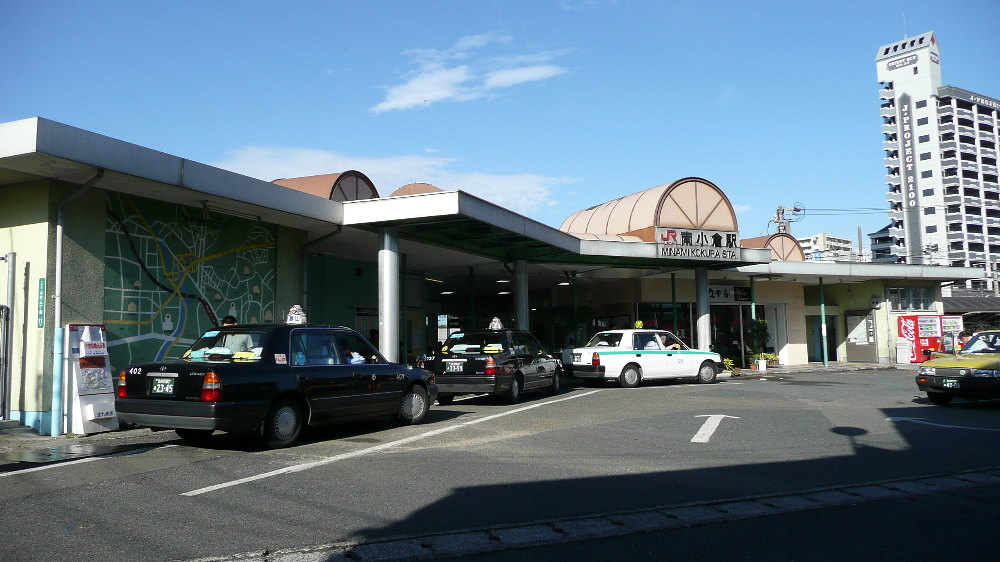
- Minami-Kokura Station in August 2007

General information
- Location: 3-11-1 Kimachi, Kokurakita-ku, Kitakyushu-shi, Fukuoka-ken 803-0851; Japan
- Coordinates: 33°52′12″N 130°51′53″E
- Operator: JR Kyushu
- Lines: JF Nippō Main Line; JI Hitahikosan Line
- Distance: 3.5 km from Kokura
- Platforms: 1 island platform
- Tracks: 2

Construction
- Structure type: At grade

Other information
- Status: Staffed (Midori no Madoguchi)
- Station code: JF03; JI03
- Website: Official website

History
- Opened: 1 December 1944; 81 years ago

Passengers
- 2020: 4,168 daily (boarding only)

Services
Preceding station	JR Kyushu	Following station
Jōno JF 05 towards Kagoshima	Nippō Main Line	Nishi-Kokura JF 03 towards Kokura
Location
- Location within Fukuoka Prefecture Location within Kyushu Location within Japan

Minami-Kokura Station (南小倉駅, Minami-kokura-eki) is a junction passenger railway station located in Kokuraminami-ku, Kitakyushu, Fukuoka Prefecture, Japan. It is operated by JR Kyushu.

== Lines ==
Minami-Kokura Station is served by the Nippō Main Line and is located 3.5 km from the starting point of the line at Kokura. It is also served by trains of Hitahikosan Line, which continue past the nominal terminus of the line at Jōno to terminate at Kokura.

== Layout ==
The station consists of one island platform with an elevated station building. The station has a Midori no Madoguchi staffed ticket office.

=== Platforms ===
1	■ JF Nippō Main Line	for Yukuhashi and Nakatsu
	■ JI Hitahikosan Line	for Tagawa-Gotōji and Soeda
2	■ JF Nippō Main Line	for Kokura
	■ JI Hitahikosan Line	for Kokura

== History ==
Minami-Kokura Station was established as a signal station on 20 August 1941 at the junction of a freight spur line to the Yamada Ammunition Depot. On 1 October 1943 it was elevated to a passenger station. With the privatization of the JNR on 1 April 1987, the station came under the control of JR Kyushu.

== Passenger statistics ==
In fiscal 2020, there was a daily average of 4169 boarding passengers at this station.。

== Surrounding area ==
- Kokura Rehabilitation Hospital
- Shinozaki Hachiman Shrine
- Kyushu Dental University
- Kyushu Nutrition Welfare University
- Seinan Jogakuin University
- Higashi Chikushi Junior College
- Seinan Jogakuin Junior College

Fukuoka Prefectural Kokura Nishi High School Fukuoka Prefectural Kokura Technical High School

== See also ==
- List of railway stations in Japan
