= Katsumi Ogawa =

Japanese politician

- 小川 克巳
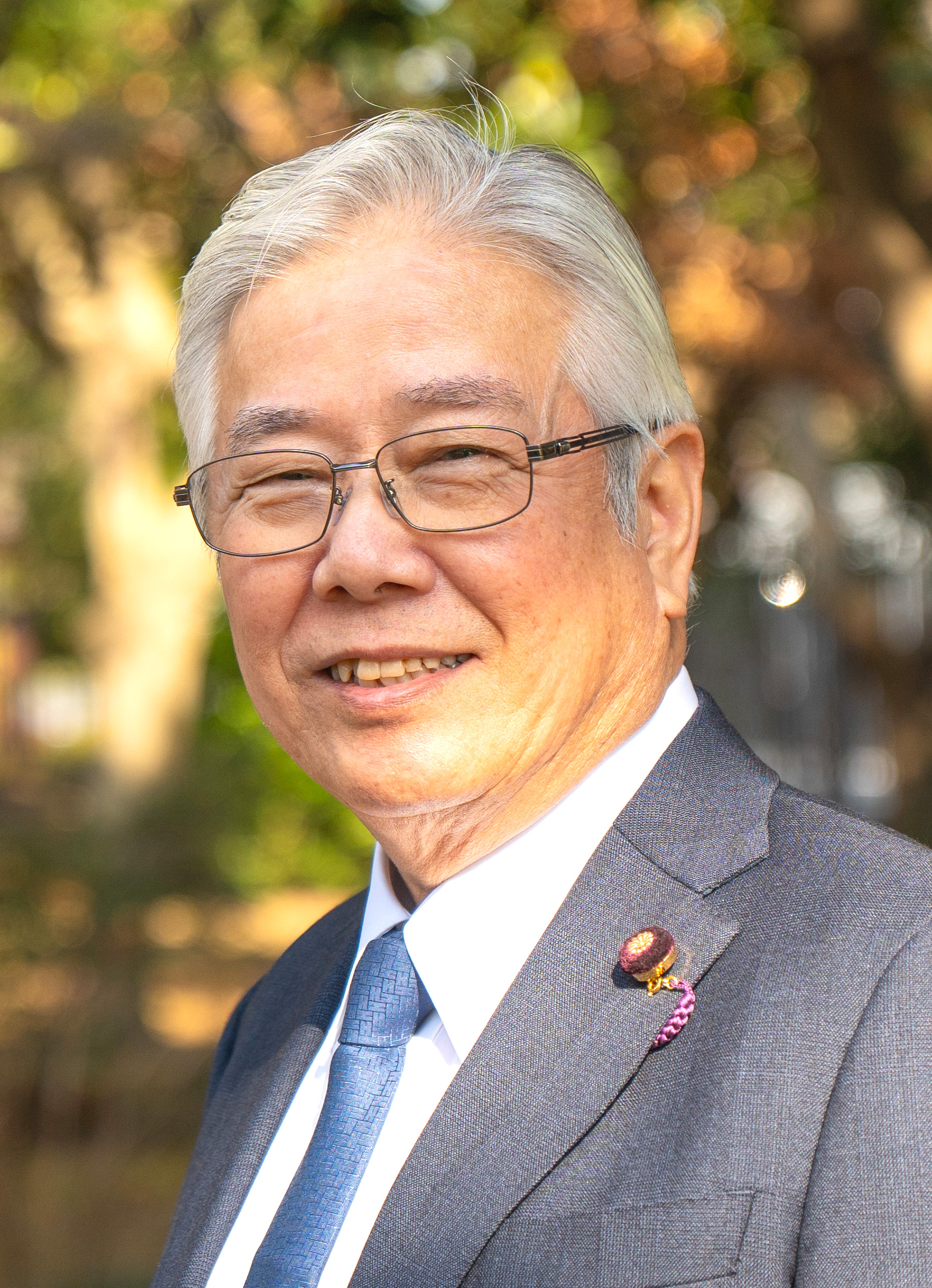
- Ogawa in 2025

Member of the House of Councillors
- Incumbent
- Assumed office 20 January 2025
- Preceded by: Toshiyuki Adachi
- Constituency: National PR
- In office 26 July 2016 – 25 July 2022
- Constituency: National PR

Personal details
- Born: 31 August 1951 (age 75) Kitakyushu, Fukuoka, Japan
- Party: Liberal Democratic
- Education: Kyushu Nutrition Welfare University; Kumamoto Gakuen University

Katsumi Ogawa is a Japanese politician who was a member of the House of Councillors of Japan from 2016 to 2022.

== Career ==
Ogawa was elected in 2016 and served until 2022.
