= Nishi-Kokura Station =

Railway station in Kitakyushu, Japan

JA 27 JF 02 JI 02 Nishi-Kokura Station 西小倉駅
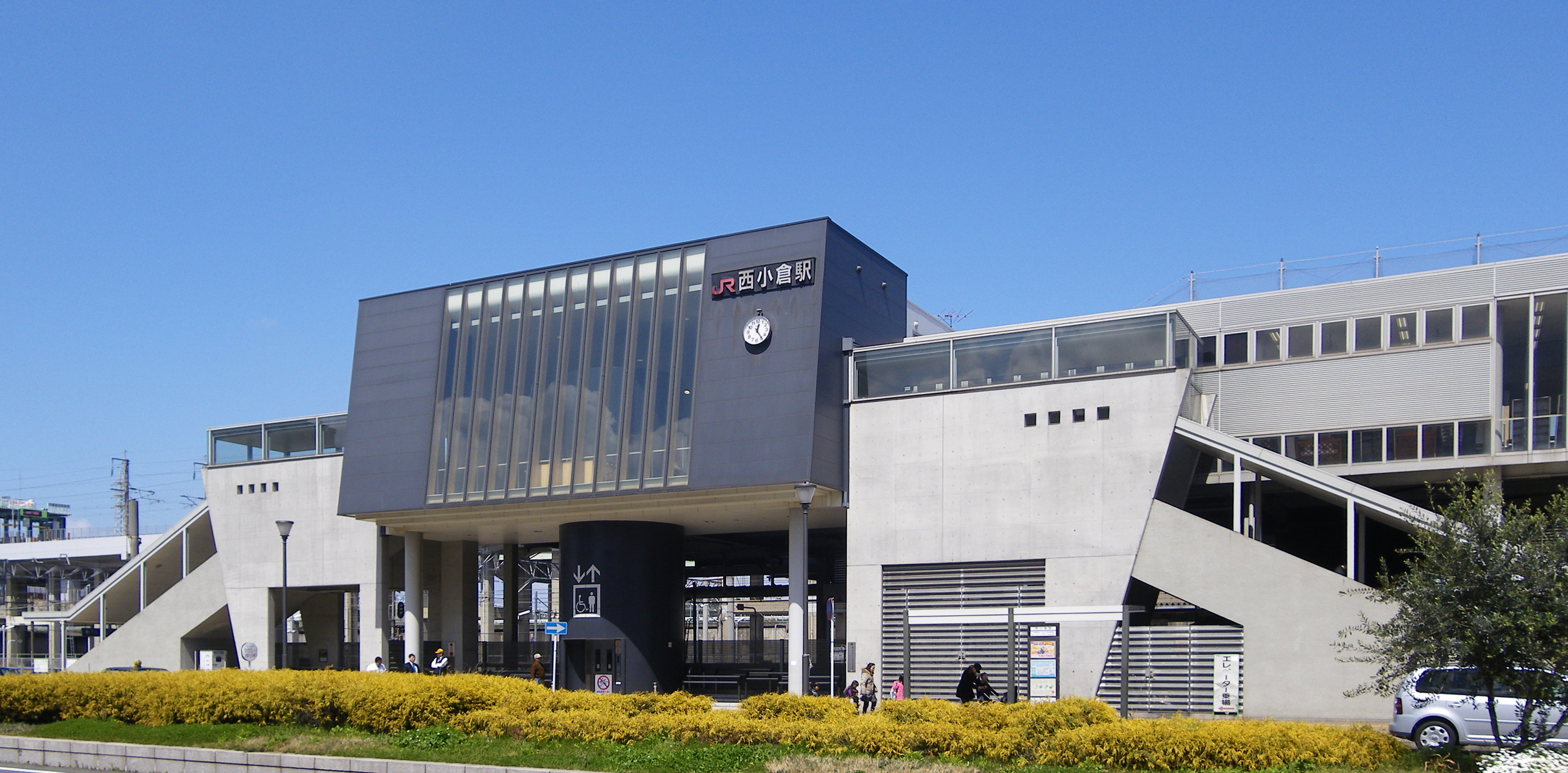
- Nishi-Kokura Station in March 2010

General information
- Location: 3-chōme-2 Muromachi, Kokurakita-ku, Kitakyushu-shi, Fukuoka-ken 803-0812; Japan
- Coordinates: 33°53′19″N 130°52′27″E
- Operator: JR Kyushu
- Lines: JA Kagoshima Main Line; JF Nippō Main Line; JI Hitahikosan Line
- Distance: 0.8 km from Kokura
- Platforms: 2 island + 1 side platform
- Tracks: 5

Construction
- Structure type: At grade

Other information
- Status: Staffed (Midori no Madoguchi)
- Station code: JA27; JF02; JI02
- Website: Official website

History
- Opened: 14 December 1974

Passengers
- FY2021: 4313 daily (boarding only)

Services
Preceding station	JR Kyushu	Following station
Minami-Kokura towards Kagoshima	Nippō Main Line Local	Kokura Terminus
Minami-Kokura towards Yoake	Hitahikosan Line Local	Kokura Terminus
Hama-Kokura towards Kagoshima	Kagoshima Main Line Local	Kokura towards Mojikō
Location
- Location within Fukuoka Prefecture Location within Kyushu Location within Japan

Nishi-Kokura Station (西小倉駅, Nishi-Kokura-eki) is a junctuion passenger railway station located in Kokurakita-ku, Kitakyushu, Fukuoka Prefecture, Japan. It is operated by JR Kyushu.

== Lines ==
Nishi-Kokura Station is served by the Kagoshima Main Line and is located 6.1 km from the starting point of the line at Mojikō. It is also served by the Nippō Main Line and is located 0.8 km from the starting point of that line at Kokura. Trains of the Hitahikosan Line also use the tracks of the Nippō Main Line past the nominal terminus of that line at Jōno to terminate at Kokura.

== Layout ==
The station consists of one side platform and two island platforms, connected by an elevated station building. The station has a Midori no Madoguchi staffed ticket office.

=== Platforms ===
1	■ JF Nippō Main Line	for Yukuhashi and Nakatsu
	■ JI Hitahikosan Line	for Tagawa-Gotōji and Soeda
2, 3	■ JF Nippō Main Line	for Kokura
4	■ JA Kagoshima Main Line	for Kurosaki and Hakata
5	■ JA Kagoshima Main Line	for Kokura and Mojikō

== History ==
Nishi-Kokura Station was established as Kokura Station (小倉駅) on 1 April 1915. On 1 March 1958 Kokura Station moved to its current location and the former station was closed. It was reopened as Nishi-Kokura Station on 14 December 1974. With the privatization of the JNR on 1 April 1987, the station came under the control of JR Kyushu. The current station building was completed in March 2013.

== Passenger statistics ==
In fiscal 2021, there was a daily average of 4,313 boarding passengers at this station.

== See also ==
- List of railway stations in Japan
