= Toshiyuki Adachi =

Japanese politician (1954–2024)

- 足立 敏之
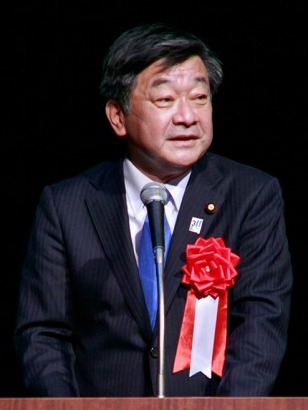
- Adachi in 2021

Member of the House of Councillors
- In office 26 July 2016 – 27 December 2024
- Preceded by: Multi-member district
- Succeeded by: Katsumi Ogawa
- Constituency: National PR

Personal details
- Born: 20 May 1954 Nishinomiya, Hyōgo, Japan
- Died: 27 December 2024 (aged 70) Maldives
- Party: Liberal Democratic
- Education: Kyoto University

Toshiyuki Adachi (Japanese: 足立 敏之; May 20, 1954 – December 27, 2024) was a Japanese politician who served as a Liberal Democratic Party member of the House of Councillors of Japan from 2016, after serving as vice minister for engineering affairs. He represented the National proportional representation block. At the time of his death, he was serving on the following committees:

- Committee on Land and Transport (Director)
- Special Committee on Disasters (Director)
- Research Committee on National Life and Economy
- Committee on Audit

== Early life ==
Adachi was born on May 20, 1954, in the Nishinomiya, Hyōgo Prefecture of Japan. He graduated from Kyoto University in 1977 with a degree in engineering, and earned a graduate degree in engineering from that same university in 1979.

== Career ==
Prior to his election to the House of Councillors, Adachi worked in the Ministry of Construction (now called Ministry of Land, Infrastructure, Transport and Tourism or MLIT). A summary of his career is presented below:

- 1979–2002: Engineer in MLIT
- 2002–2003: Counsellor for emergency national security and emergency legislation in the Cabinet.
- 2003–2006: Director of Planning Department of the Kinki (Kansai) branch of MLIT.
- 2006–2009: Director of River Planning Division of the River Bureau of MLIT.
- 2009–2011: Director of the Shikoku branch of MLIT.
- 2011–2012: Director of the Chubu branch of MLIT.
- 2012–2013: Director of the Water and Disaster Management Bureau of MLIT.
- 2013–2016: Vice-Minister for Engineering Affairs of MLIT

In 2016, he was elected to the House of Councillors. He died in a maritime accident on December 27, 2024.

== Death ==
While on vacation at a resort in Lhaviyani Atoll, Maldives, Adachi was snorkeling at sea when he was later found to be unresponsive. He was later pronounced dead by Maldives Police Service on December 27, 2024.
