= Hiroshima International University =

Private university in East Hiroshima, Japan

- 広島国際大学
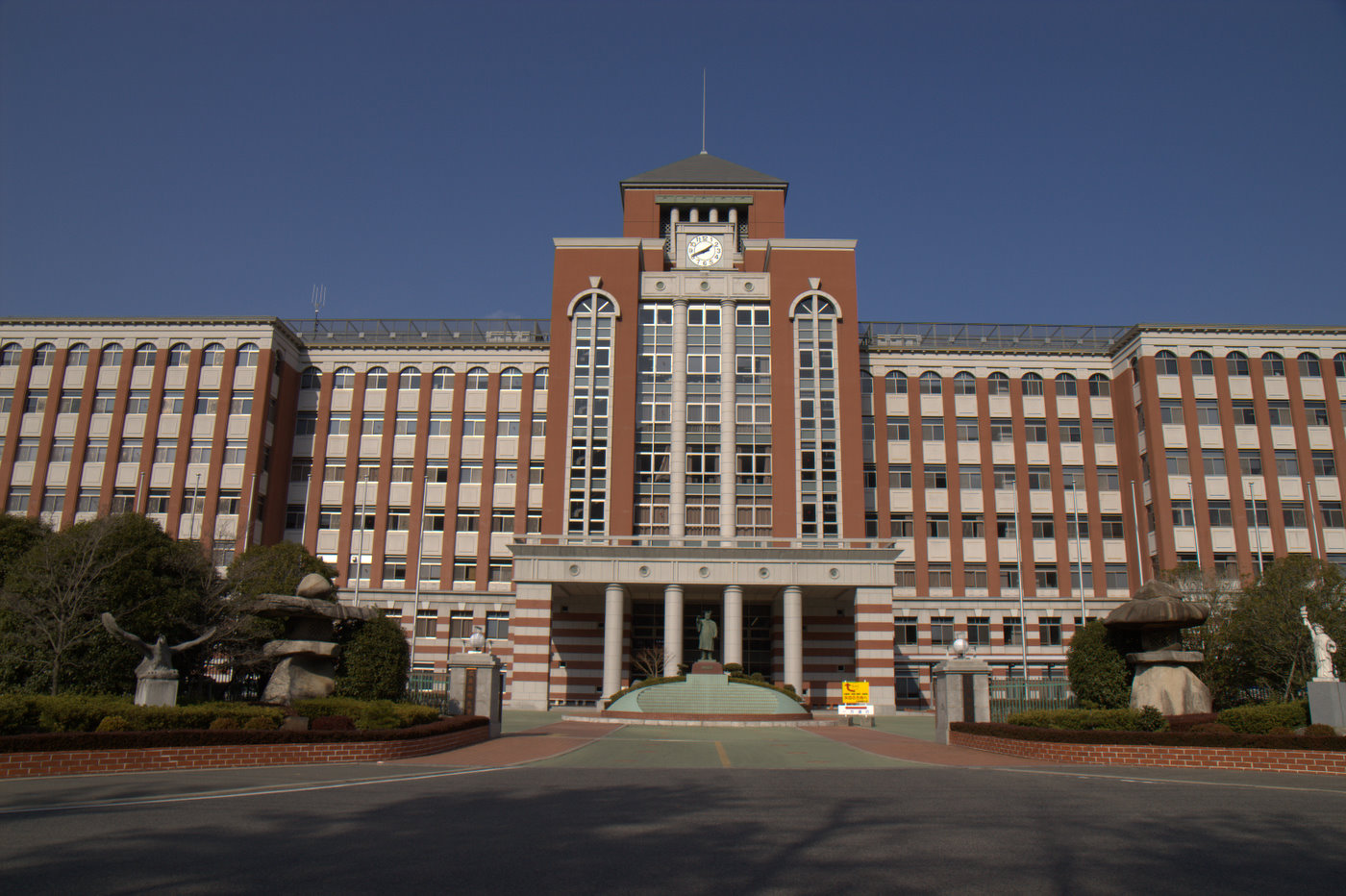
- Type: Private
- Established: 1998
- President: Masuhide Yakihiro
- Students: 4,500
- Location: Hiroshima city, Hiroshima Prefecture, Japan; 34°18′48.1″N 132°41′12.6″E
- Website: www.hirokoku-u.ac.jp/english/index.html

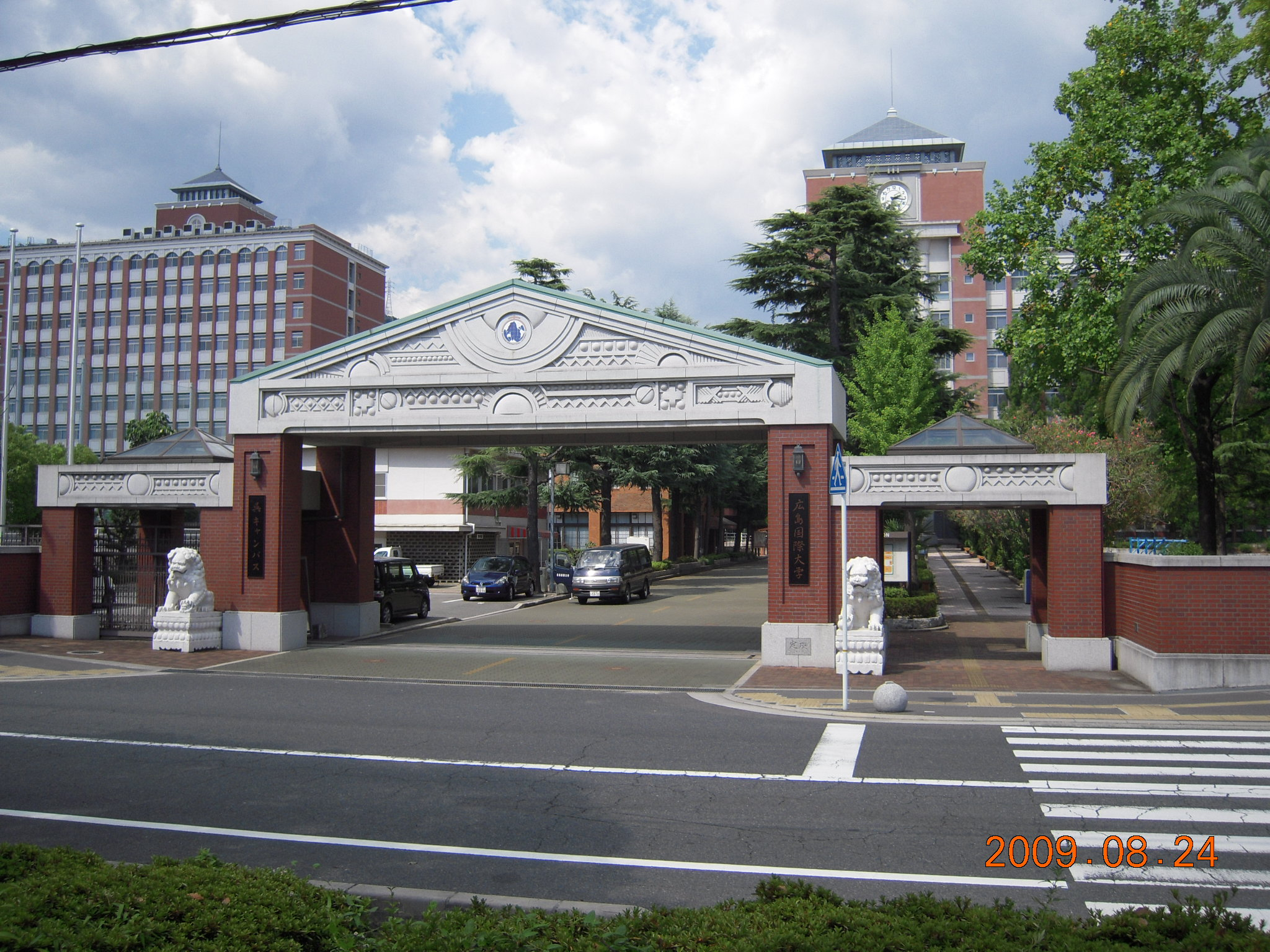
Main gate of the Kure campus.

Hiroshima International University (広島国際大学, Hiroshima Kokusai Daigaku) is a private university in East Hiroshima city, Japan. It was established by Josho Gakuen Educational Corporation, first opened in 1922 as a Kansai Engineering College, and became a four-year university in 1998, to its present name. The university has 6 faculties: Faculty of Health and Medical Sciences, Faculty of Comprehensive Rehabilitation, Faculty of Health and Sports, Faculty of Health Sciences, Faculty of Nursing, and Faculty of Pharmacy with total capacity of 1,060 entrance students and 17 international students (out of 4132 students body).

The university is offering 10 undergraduate majors with rank of 201+ (in Japan University Rankings in 2023) based on Times Higher Education (out of more than 750 universities in 2013), and it has exchange program with Semey Medical University, Republic of Kazakhstan. The University is part of the Hiroshima Research and Educational Institutes Network for Peace in conjunction with the United Nations Institute for Training and Research.

== Sister universities ==
- Taiwan
  - National Formosa University

== See also ==
- List of universities in Japan
