= Kobe Tokiwa College =

Co-ed private junior college in Kobe, Hyōgo, Japan

Coordinates: 34°39′55.66″N 135°08′28.86″E

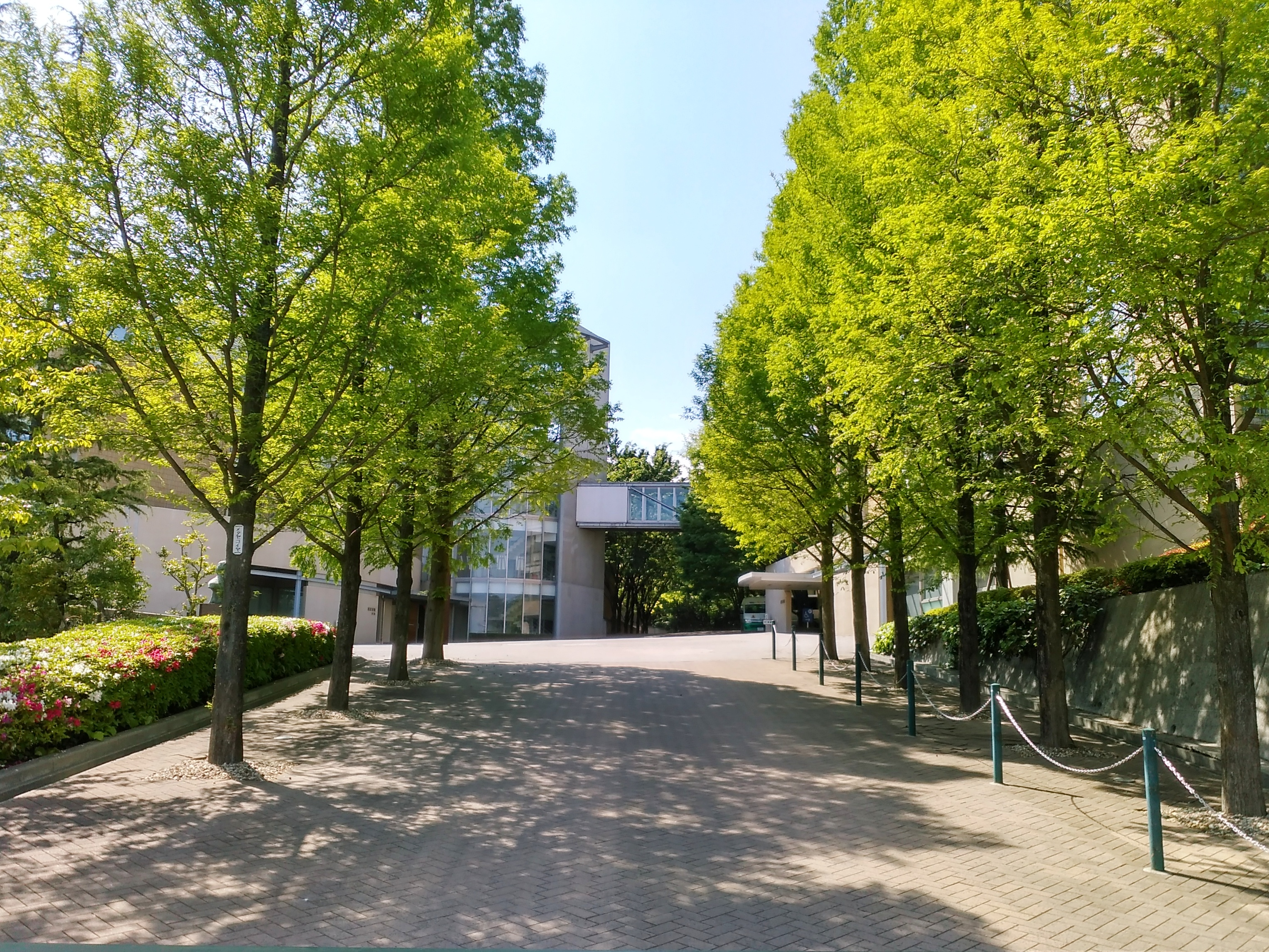
Kobe Tokiwa College

Kobe Tokiwa College (神戸常盤大学短期大学部, Kobe Tokiwa Daigaku Tankidaigakubu) is a co-ed private junior college in Kobe, Hyōgo, Japan, established in 1967.

In 2008 the school corporation (Tamada Educational Institution) established Kobe Tokiwa University by reorganizing two departments (medical technology and nursing) of the college.
