= Kanai Yoshiko =

- 金井淑子
- Born: 1944 (age 81–82); Yokosuka, Kanagawa Prefecture, Japan
- Other name: Yoshiko Kanai
- Occupation: academic
- Years active: 1971–2015

Kanai Yoshiko (Japanese: 金井淑子, born 1944) is a Japanese academic and feminist theorist. She explored the complexities of the feminist movements in Japan and the difficulty in launching women's studies in a society bound by dualistic definitions of gender. Coining the phrase "housewife feminism", she addressed how Japanese society had attempted to appease women without addressing the underlying systemic problems that continued to foster inequality.

== Early life ==
Kanai Yoshiko was born in 1944 in Yokosuka, Kanagawa Prefecture, Japan. She graduated from the University of Tokyo (UT) with a degree in literature and philosophy in 1967 and went on to further her education at UT, earning a master's degree education and ethics.

== Career ==
Kanai began her career at the newly established Nagaoka Women's Junior College in 1971. She was one of the first academics in Japan to focus on women's studies. She remained at Nagaoka Junior College until 1999, when she accepted a position at Yokohama National University in the Human Sciences Department. She reached the university's mandatory retirement barrier in 2010 and took a post in the philosophy and letters department at Rissho University, from which she retired in 2015.

Kanai was most known as a specialist in gender studies and ethics, writing numerous books analyzing the feminist movement in Japan and its limitations. She coined the phrase "housewife feminism" to refer to a particular type of issues-based feminism, where the official response establishes quotas and training to counteract imbalances, but does nothing to address the underlying systemic biases. She argued that rather than giving women real power for their own development, the focus of identity politics on nationalist and traditional aims provided pacifiers, such as men taking on more household duties, and led to continued co-opting of women's ability to define themselves and direct policies which affected them. In turn, she found that no radical feminist movement developed in Japan, because women readily accepted a binary gender model and succumbed to pressure to define themselves in the role of wife. By accepting traditional roles, Japanese motherhood is glorified and a one-size-fits-all approach is used to address issues. She has noted that the failure to grasp that "…equality of sexual power [is] a human right of women and sexual violence against women [is] a violation of human rights" was a stumbling block to women's empowerment.

== Selected works ==
- 転機に立つフェミニズム [Feminism at a turning point] (in Japanese). Tokyo, Japan: 每日新聞社. 1985. OCLC 568172176.
- ポストモダン・フェミニズム: 差異と女性 [Postmodern feminism—Differences and women] (in Japanese) (Dai 1-han. ed.). Tōkyō: Keisō Shobō. 1989. ISBN 978-4-326-65111-5.
- 女性学の練習問題: "Hanako"と"婦人" のはざまで [The practice of women's studies: "Hanako" and "Lady"] (in Japanese). Tokyo, Japan: 明石書店. 1991. OCLC 959640730.
- フェミニズム問題の転換 [The transformation of the feminist problem] (in Japanese) (Dai 1-han. ed.). Tokyo, Japan: Keisō Shobō. 1992. ISBN 978-4-326-65142-9.
- 女性学の挑戦: 家父長制・ジェンダー・身体性へ [The challenge of women's studies—patriarchy, gender and physicality] (in Japanese). Tokyo, Japan: Akashi Shoten. 1997. ISBN 978-4-750-30926-2.
- 身体のエシックス/ポリティクス―倫理学とフェミニズムの交叉 [The Ethics of the Body: The crossover between ethics and feminism] (in Japanese). Kyoto, Japan: Nakanishiya shuppan. 2002. ISBN 978-4-888-48723-8. (coauthor: Makoto Hosoya)
- ファミリー・トラブル―近代家族/ジェンダーのゆくえ [Family trouble—Modern family / Gender's future] (in Japanese) (Shohan. ed.). Tokyo, Japan: Akashi Shoten. 2006. ISBN 978-4-750-32444-9.
- 異なっていられる社会を―女性学／ジェンダー研究の視座 [Different societies: Women's Studies/Gender research Perspectives] (in Japanese) (Shohan. ed.). Tokyo, Japan: Akashi Shoten. 2008. ISBN 978-4-750-32724-2.
- 身体とアイデンティティ・トラブル―ジェンダー/セックスの二元論を超えて [Body and Identity Troubles-gender/sex beyond dualism] (in Japanese) (Shohan. ed.). Tokyo, Japan: Akashi Shoten. 2008. ISBN 978-4-750-32769-3.
- 依存と自立の倫理: 女/母〉の身体性から [Ethics of Dependence and Independence: From the physical nature of woman/mother] (in Japanese) (Shohan. ed.). Kyoto, Japan: Nakanishiya Shuppan. 2011. ISBN 978-4-779-50498-3.
- 倫理学とフェミニズム: ジェンダー、身体、他者をめぐるジレンマ [Ethics and Feminism: Gender, Body, Dilemma of Others] (in Japanese). Kyoto, Japan: Nakanishiya Shuppan. 2013. ISBN 978-4-779-50741-0.
- AMPO Japan-Asia Quarterly Review, ed. (2015). "Issues for Japanese Feminism". Voices from the Japanese Women's Movement (2nd ed.). London, England: Routledge. pp. 3–22. ISBN 978-1-317-45251-5.
