= Toyohashi Sozo College =

Toyohashi SOZO University
- 豊橋創造大学
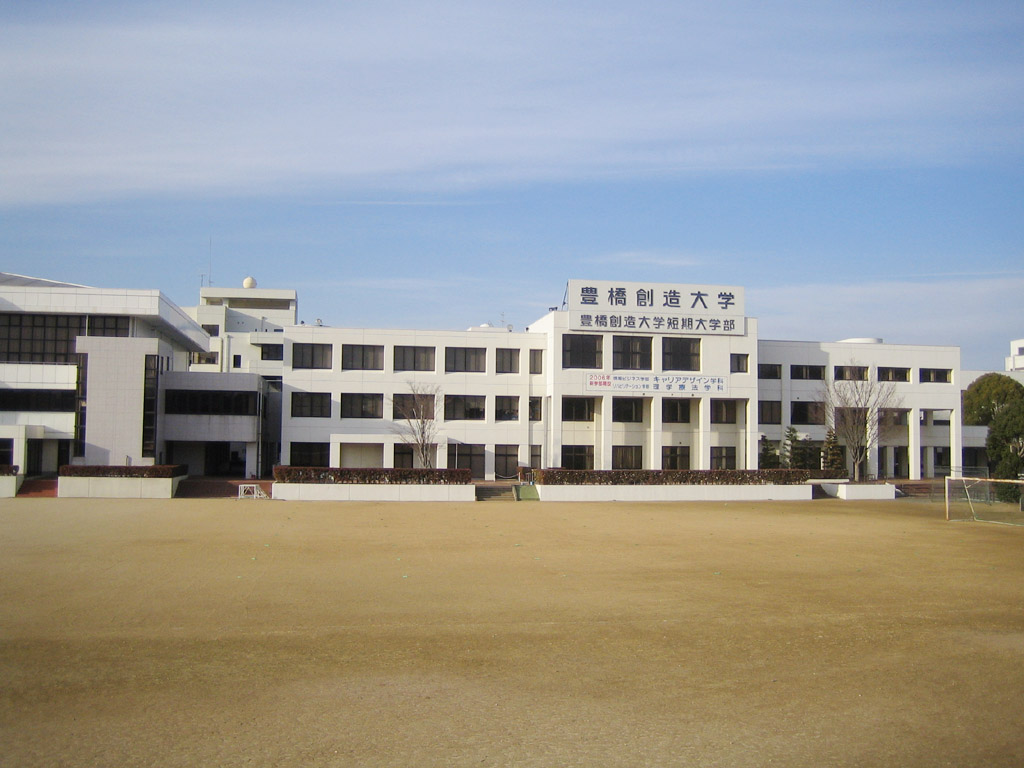
- Toyohashi SOZO University
- Type: Private
- Established: 1996
- Location: Toyohashi, Aichi, Japan; 34.7762°N 137.4088°E
- Website: www.sozo.ac.jp (in Japanese)

Toyohashi SOZO University (豊橋創造大学, Toyohashi sōzō daigaku) is a private university in Toyohashi, Aichi, Japan. The predecessor of the school, Toyohashi Junior College, was founded in 1983. In 1996, Toyohashi Sozo College was established as a single-faculty institution and later expanded into a university with multiple faculties in 2006.

== Toyohashi SOZO Junior College ==
Toyohashi SOZO Junior College
- 豊橋創造大学短期大学部
- Type: Private Junior college
- Established: 1983
- President: Haruyasu Ito
- Students: 194(As of May 1, 2022)
- Other students: 1^{a}(As of May 1, 2022)
- Location: 20-1, Matsushita, Ushikawa-cho, Toyohashi, Aichi, 440-8512, Japan
- Campus: rural
- Colors: Orange, gray and black
- Website: www.sozo.ac.jp (in Japanese)
- ^{a} Short-term course.

Toyohashi SOZO Junior College (豊橋創造大学短期大学部, Toyohashi Sōzō Daigaku Tanki Daigakubu) is a private junior college located in Toyohashi, Aichi, Japan. Situated beside Toyo-gawa River, it is the second junior college established in the eastern Mikawa. The college has two departments and one short-term course.

Founded in 1983 as Toyohashi Junior College (豊橋短期大学, Toyohashi Tankidaigaku), it was originally a women's college established by Fujinohana gakuen, currently the Department of Preschool Education and the short-term Course for Civil Service Exam Preparation (Department of Public Officials) are coeducational, and the Department of Life and Career Planning is for women.

In 1996, Fujinohana Gakuen established the four-year Toyohashi SOZO College (current Toyohashi SOZO University) on the same campus. Toyohashi Junior College continues to operate at its current site under the new name of Toyohashi SOZO Junior College.

In 2023, it became 40 years since Toyohashi Junior College was founded.

=== Departments ===
- Department of Preschool Education
- Department of Life and Career Planning
- Department of Public Officials (one-year short-term course)

The Department of Preschool Education and Department of Life and Career Planning offer two-year associate degrees.
