= Japanese Red Cross Tohoku Junior College of Care and Welfare =

Coordinates: 39.6858°N 140.1548°E

- 日本赤十字東北看護大学介護福祉短期大学部
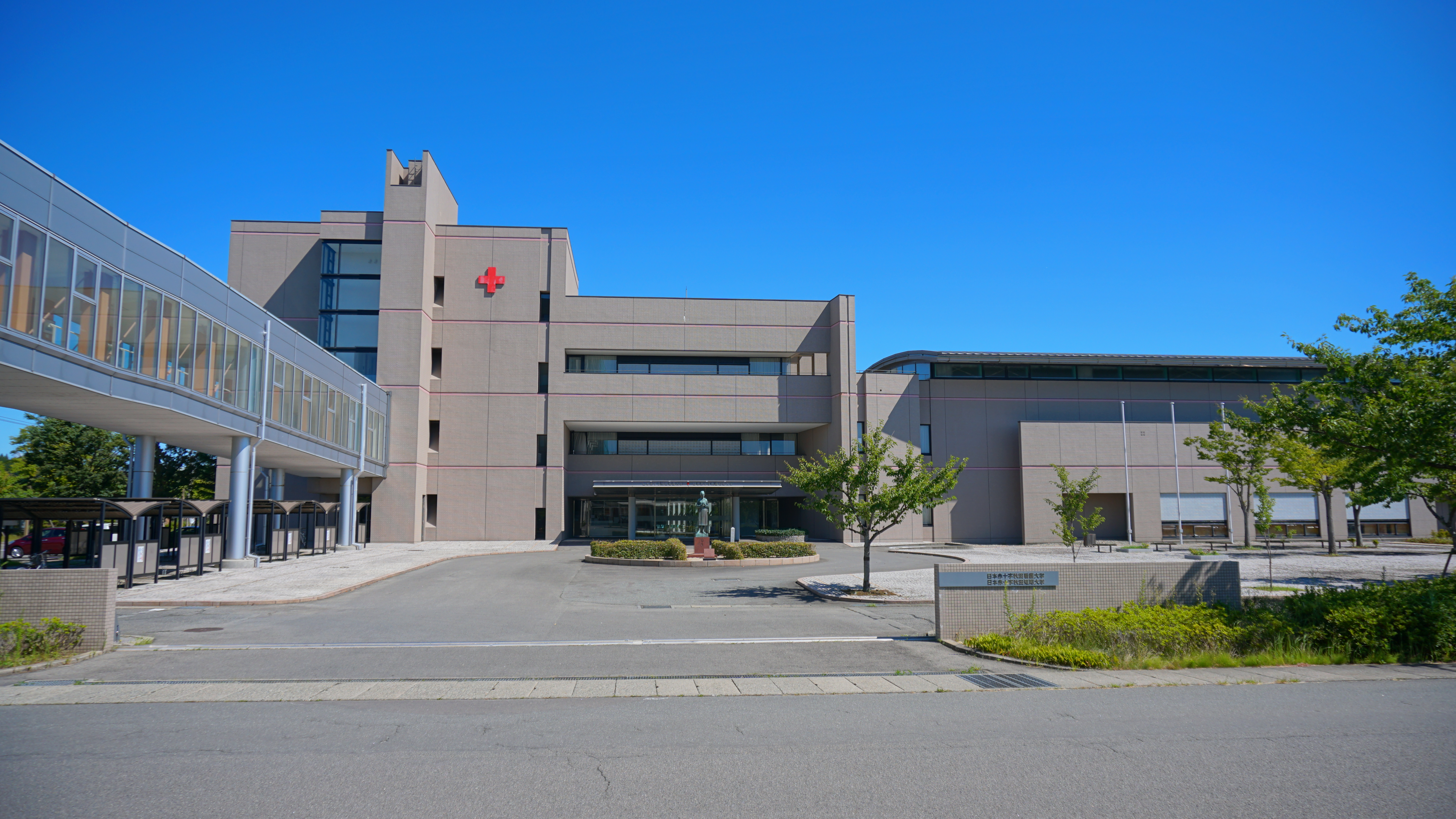
- Type: Private junior college
- Established: 1996
- Academic staff: Nursing, Certified care work
- Location: Akita, Akita, Japan
- Website: https://www.rctohoku.ac.jp/department/

Japanese Red Cross Tohoku Junior College of Care and Welfare (日本赤十字東北看護大学介護福祉短期大学部, Nihon Sekijūji Tōhoku Kango Daigaku Kaigo Fukushi Tanki Daigakubu) is a private junior college in Akita, Akita, Japan.

== History ==
The junior college opened in April 1996 with two academic departments: nursing and care work, but the predecessor of the school was founded in 1896. The name was changed to its current name on April 1, 2025.

== Courses offered ==
- Certified care work
- Nursing

== See also ==
- Japanese Red Cross Tohoku College of Nursing
- List of junior colleges in Japan
