= Toyokawa Bridge =

Coordinates: 34°46′34″N 137°19′58″E

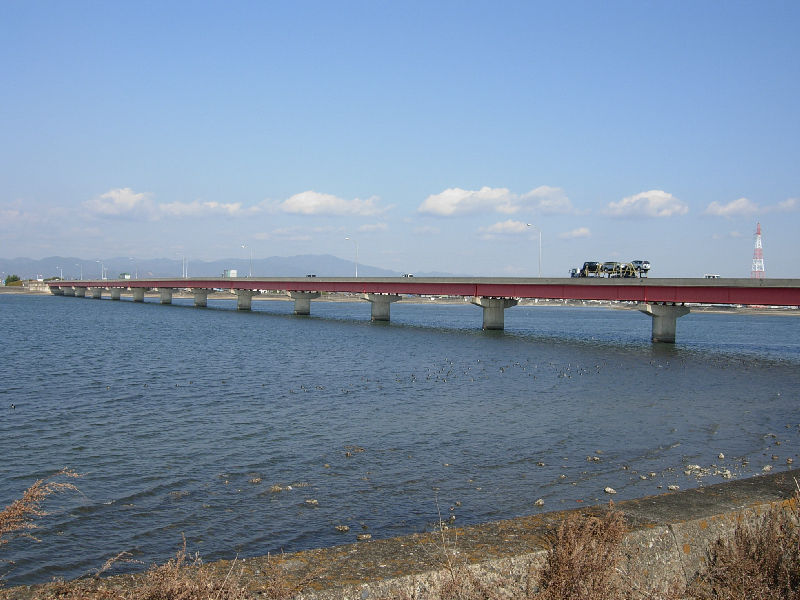
The Toyokawa Bridge

The Toyokawa Bridge (豊川橋, Toyogawa-hashi) is a bridge over the Toyo River (Toyo-gawa) in Japan. It connects the cities of Toyohashi and Toyokawa in Aichi Prefecture. The bridge carries Route 23 across the river.

== Overview ==
Completed in 1982, the bridge was originally a toll road managed by the Japan Highway Public Corporation, charging 200 yen for general vehicles. It was bought in 2005 and became a national highway, with no toll. When it was a toll bridge, traffic volume was not so heavy since many vehicles used the free Wattsu and Maeshiba bridges upstream. However, after it became free, the traffic volume increased dramatically on Toyokawa Bridge, often leading to congestion at the intersections on both ends. Therefore, the bridge went through several improvements, including a multi-level intersection, and became a four-lane bridge on June 16, 2013.
