= Hamamatsu Gakuin University =

Coordinates: 34.720803°N 137.713118°E

- 浜松学院大学
- Type: private
- Established: 1933, university from 2004
- Location: Hamamatsu, Shizuoka, Japan

Hamamatsu Gakuin University (浜松学院大学, Hamamatsu Gakuin Daigaku) is a private university in Hamamatsu City, Shizuoka Prefecture Japan.

The predecessor of the school was founded in 1933, and it was chartered as a junior college in 1951. It became a four-year college 2004. It specializes in modern communications studies.
