= Kinjo University =

Coordinates: 36°30′34.8″N 136°31′42.7″E

- 金城大学
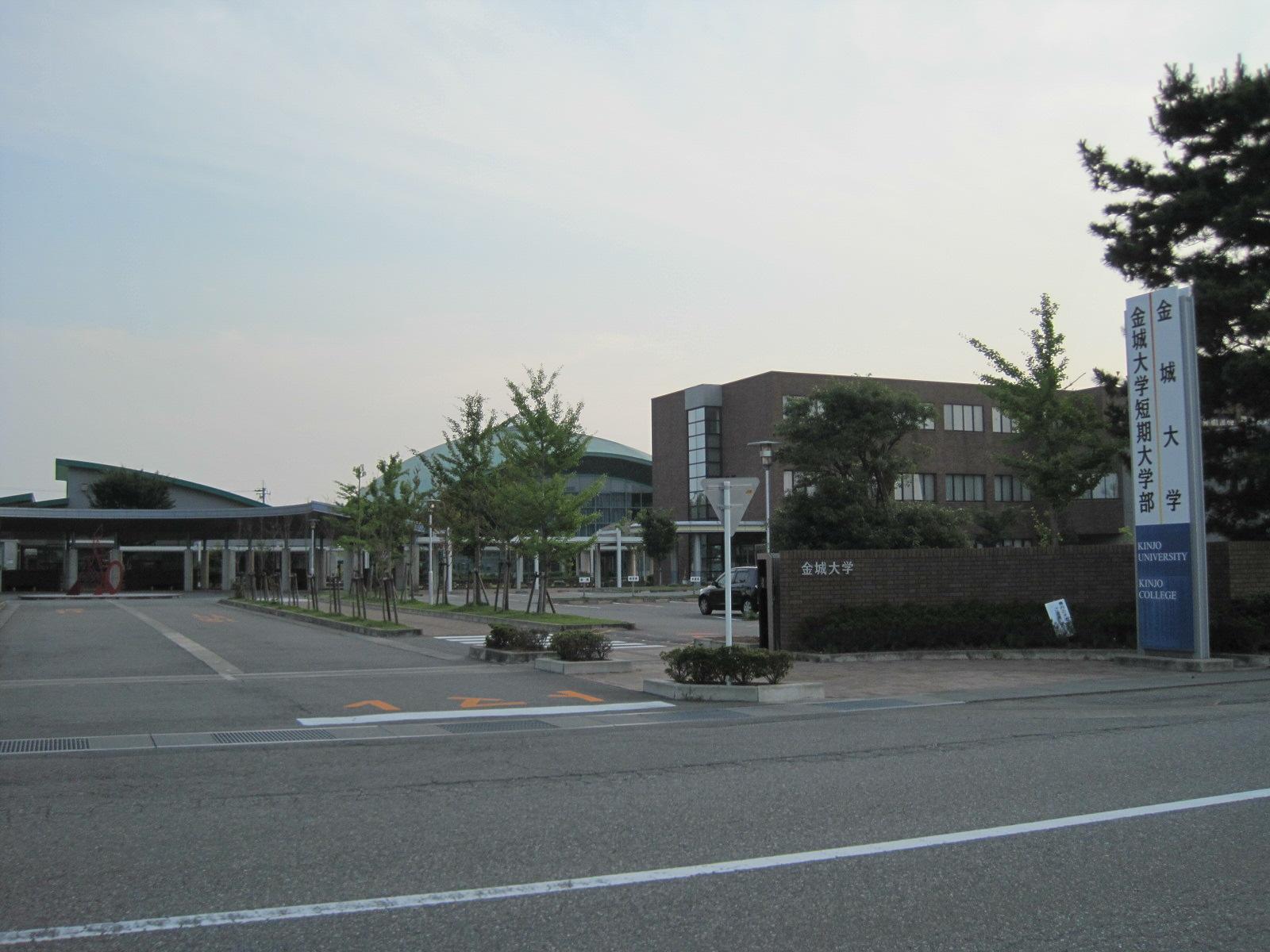
- Entrance to Kinjo University
- Type: Private
- Location: Hakusan, Ishikawa, Japan
- Website: www.kinjo.ac.jp/ku/ (in Japanese)

Kinjo University (金城大学, Kinjō daigaku) is a private university in Hakusan, Ishikawa, Japan. The predecessor of the school was founded in 1904, and it was chartered as a university in 2000.

The university is named after Kanazawa Castle, which has historically been also called Kinjō (金城 "Golden Castle").
