= Osaka University of Comprehensive Children Education =

Coordinates: 34°36′28.8″N 135°32′20.9″E

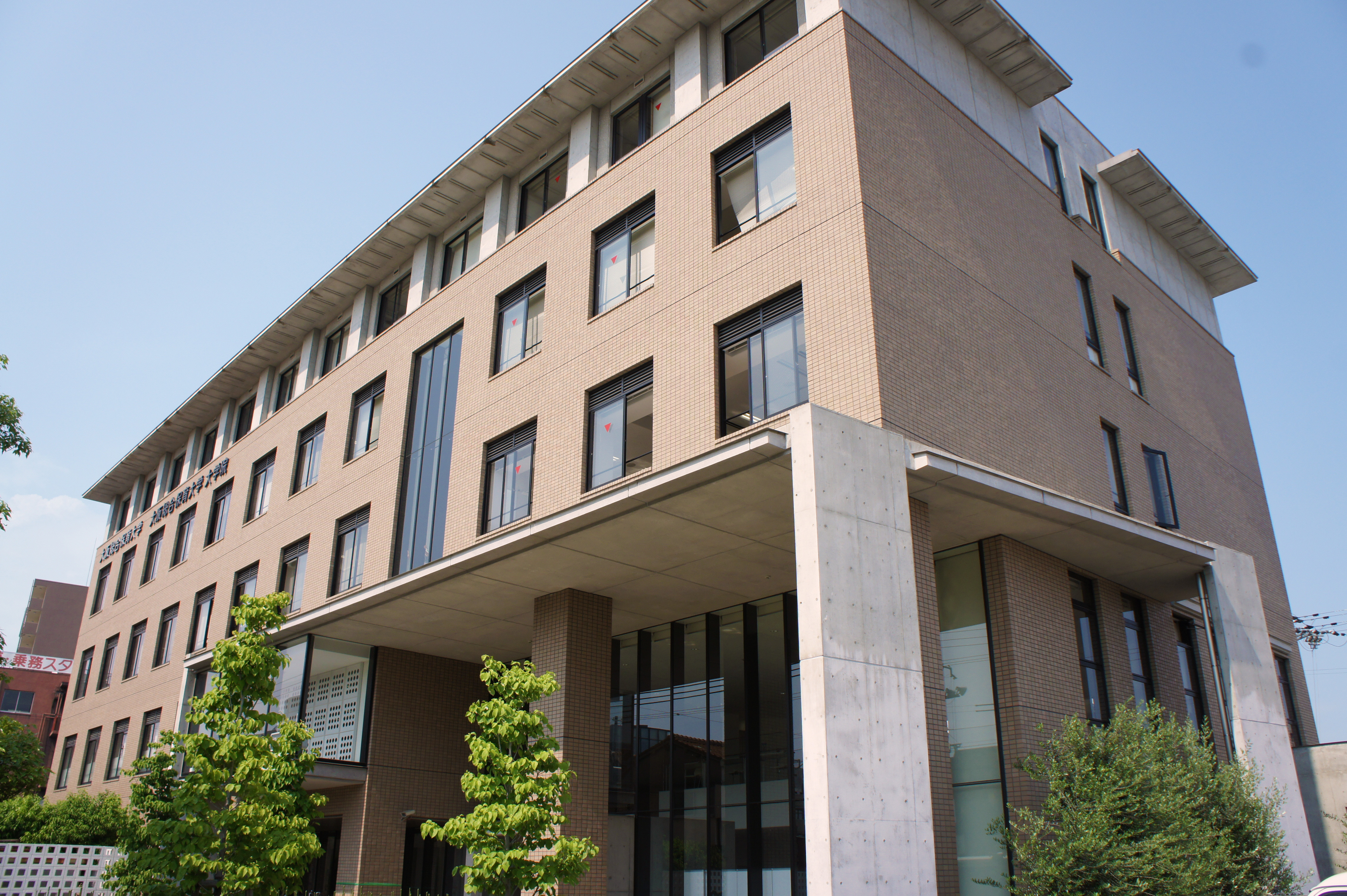
Osaka University of Comprehensive Children Education

Osaka University of Comprehensive Children Education (大阪総合保育大学, Ōsaka sōgō hoiku daigaku) is a private university in Osaka, Osaka, Japan, established in 2006.
