= Health Science University (Fujikawaguchiko, Japan) =

University in Fujikawaguchiko, Japan

Coordinates: 35°27′54.53″N 138°44′43.60″E

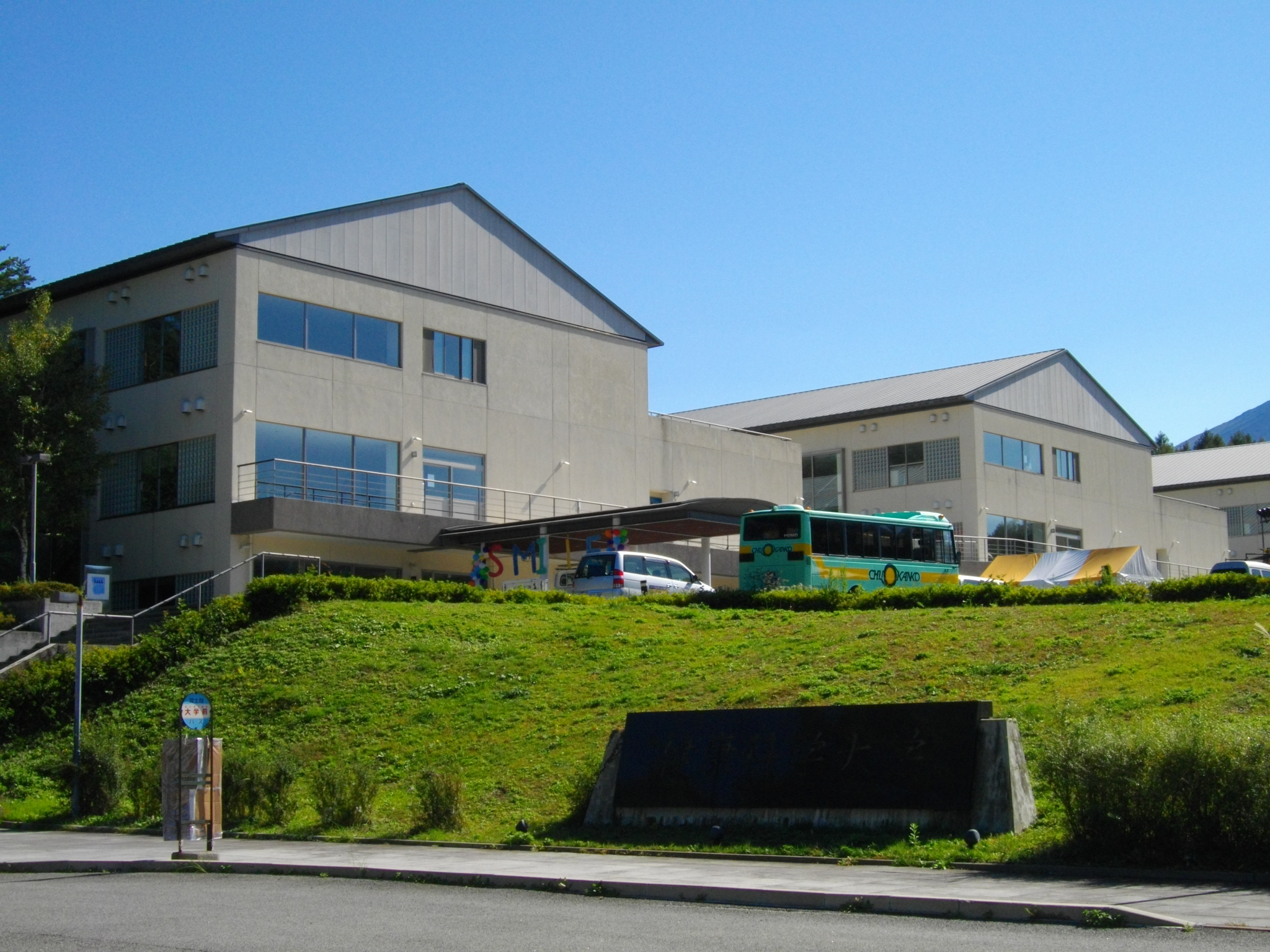
Health Science University

Health Science University (健康科学大学, Kenkō kagaku daigaku) is a private university in Fujikawaguchiko, Yamanashi Prefecture, Japan. It was established in 2003.
