= Shizuoka Eiwa Gakuin University =

Co-educational private university in Shizuoka city, Shizuoka Prefecture Japan

Coordinates: 34°58′59″N 138°26′11″E

- 静岡英和学院大学
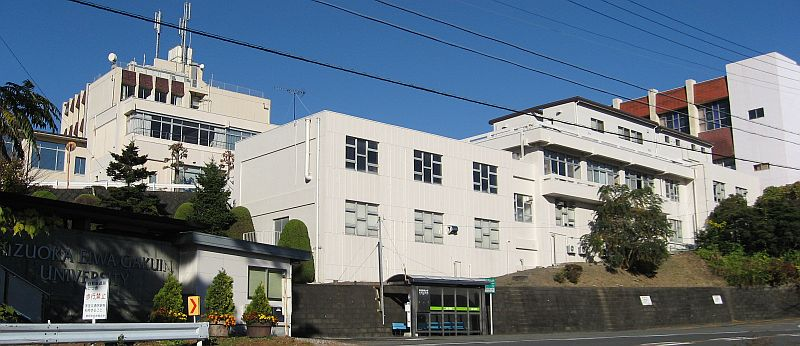
- Shizuoka Eiwa Gakuin University
- Type: Private
- Established: 1887; university from 2002
- Affiliations: Methodist Church
- Students: 1400
- Location: 1769 Ikeda, Suruga-ku, Shizuoka City 422-8545, Shizuoka, Shizuoka, Japan
- Nickname: Eiwa

Shizuoka Eiwa Gakuin University (静岡英和学院大学, Shizuoka Eiwa Gakuin Daigaku) is a co-educational private university in Shizuoka city, Shizuoka Prefecture, Japan.

== History ==
The Shizuoka Eiwa Girls’ School was founded in 1887 by missionaries from the Methodist Church of Canada (especially Martha Jane Cunningham, the school's first principal), with the support of the Shizuoka prefectural government, and continues to be affiliated with the Methodist church. It was the first institution in Shizuoka Prefecture to offer secondary education for girls.

Shizuoka Eiwa College, a two-year institution, was established in 1966. A third-year program in English language and Japanese literature was added in 1992, and it became a four-year coeducational university in 2002. Today, over 1400 students are enrolled in two- and four-year programs.

== Academic Programmes ==
- Four year programmes
  - Department Humanities and Social Sciences
    - Psychology
    - Literature
    - Culture and Tourism
    - International Inter-Disciplinary Studies
  - Department of Community and Social Welfare
    - Education
    - Social Welfare
- Two year programmes
  - Department of Contemporary Communications
    - Business management
    - Tourism
    - Health care
  - Department of Food Science
    - Food and Nutrition
