= Osaka Butsuryo University =

- 大阪物療大学
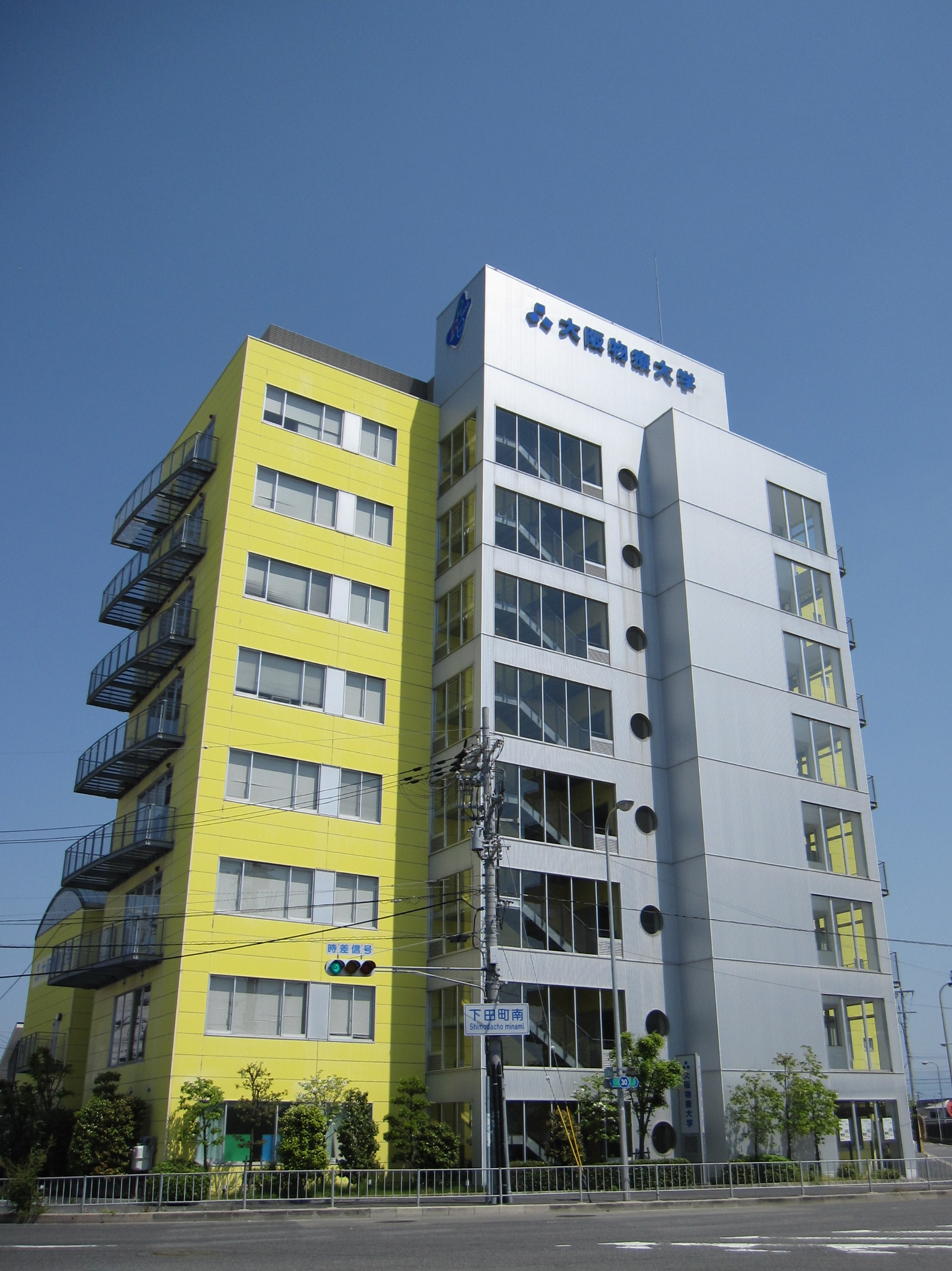
- Osaka Butsuryo University Sakai campus
- Former names: Butsuryo Gakuin
- Established: 2011
- Founders: Butsuryo Gakuen
- Chairman: Hiroshi Tanaka
- Academic staff: 39 (2021)
- Students: 346 (2021)
- Location: 4-410-5 Otorihigashimachi, Nishi-ku, Sakai, Osaka
- Campus: Buildings 1 and 2, Building No. 3 (Gakuen Headquarters), Building No. 4
- Website: http://www.butsuryo.ac.jp/

Osaka Butsuryo University (Japanese: 大阪物療大学, Ōsaka Butsuryō Daigaku) is a private university in Sakai, Osaka, Japan. It was founded in 1933 as Butsuryo Gakuin, and established as a university in 2011.

== History ==
The university was founded as Butsuryo Gakuin (物療学院) in 1933.

It was renamed as Osaka Butsuryo Specialized Training College (大阪物療専門学校) in 1955. The training college became a part of educational corporation Butsuryo Gakuen (学校法人物療学園) in 1985. In 1988 the college moved to the Sakai building (current campus).

Osaka Butsuryo University was established in 2011. Osaka Butsuryo Specialized Training College was closed in 2013.

== Faculties and research ==
=== Faculties ===
- Faculty of Health Sciences
  - Department of Radiological Technology
  - Clinical Skills Education Program

=== Affiliated school ===
- Osaka Butsuryo Specialized Training College
