= Okayama Gakuin University =

Higher education institution in Okayama Prefecture, Japan

Coordinates: 34°34′22″N 133°47′56″E

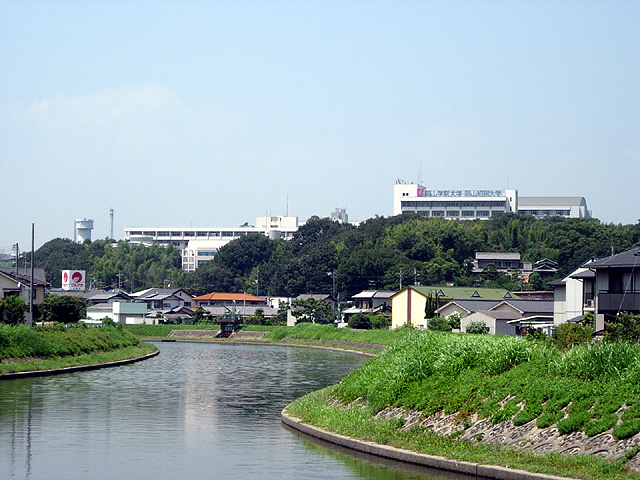
Okayama Gakuin University

Okayama Gakuin University (岡山学院大学, Okayama gakuin daigaku) is a private university in Kurashiki, Okayama, Japan. The predecessor of the school, junior women's college, was founded in 1951, and it became a co-ed four-year college in 2002.
