= Kumamoto Health Science University =

Coordinates: 32°51′13″N 130°41′51″E

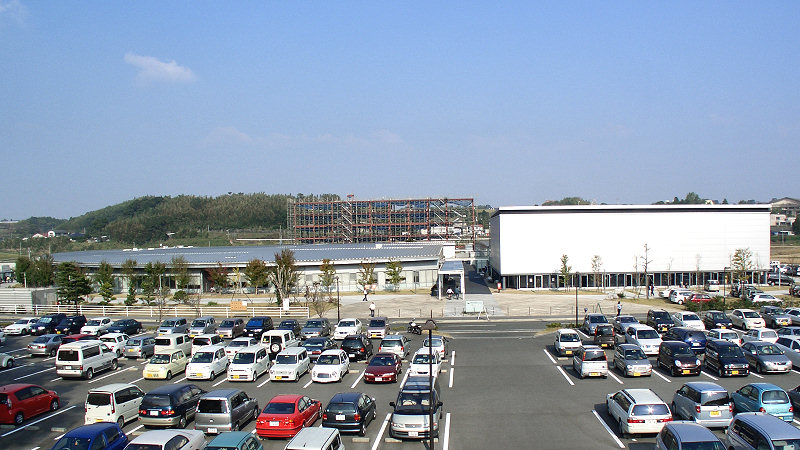
Kumamoto Health Science University

Kumamoto Health Science University (熊本保健科学大学, Kumamoto hoken kagaku daigaku) is a private university in Kumamoto, Kumamoto, Japan, established in 2003.
