= Kobe Tokiwa University =

Co-educational private university in Nagata-ku, Kobe, Hyōgo, Japan

Coordinates: 34°39′55.66″N 135°08′28.86″E

- 神戸常盤大学
- Type: Private
- Established: 2008
- President: Kunihiro Ueda
- Academic staff: 54 (May 2011)
- Students: 684 (May 2011)
- Location: Kobe, Hyōgo, Japan
- Campus: Urban
- Website: www.kobe-tokiwa.ac.jp

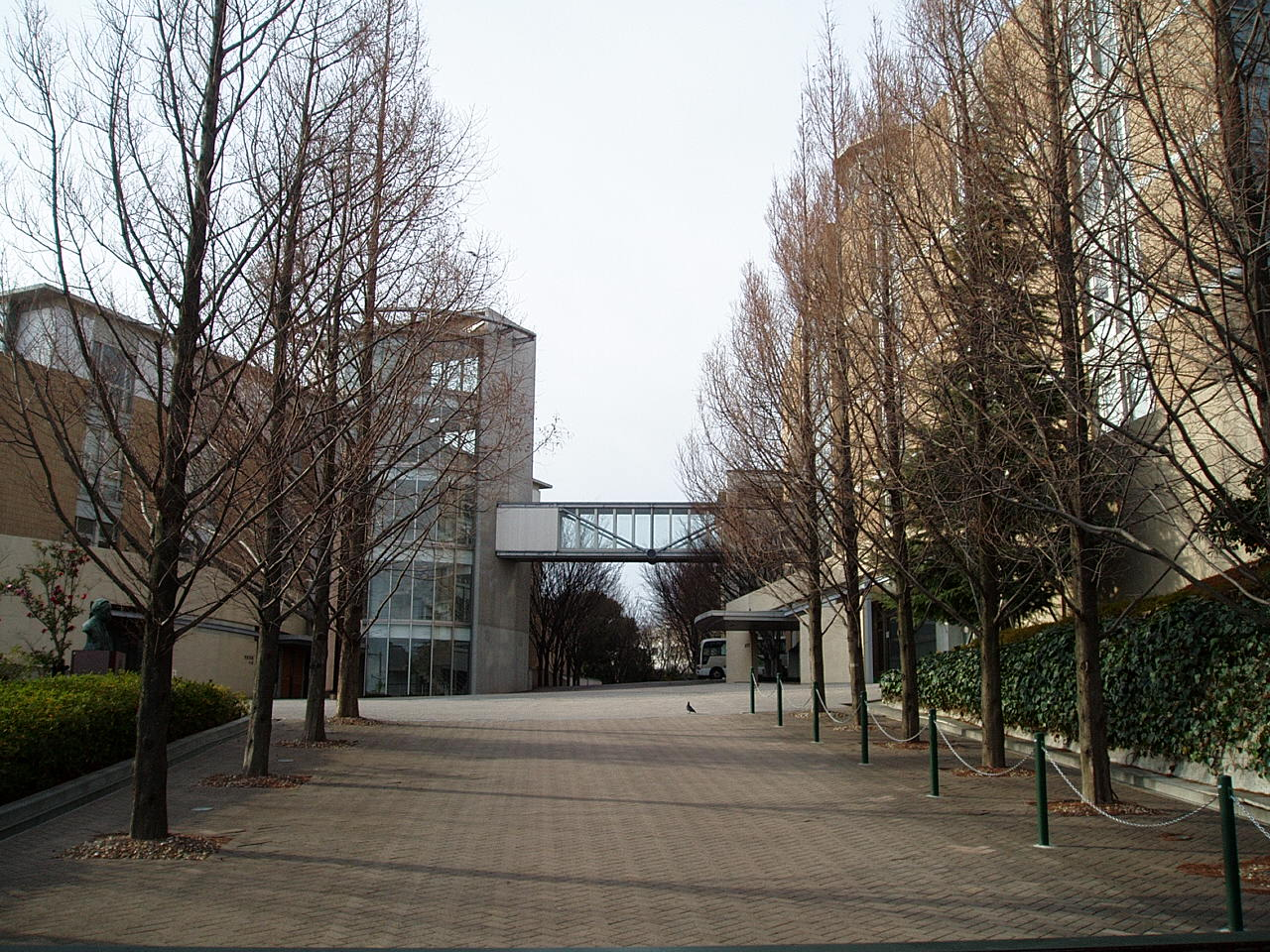
Kobe Tokiwa University

Kobe Tokiwa University (神戸常盤大学, Kōbe tokiwa daigaku) is a co-educational private university in Nagata-ku, Kobe, Hyōgo, Japan.

The university was established in 2008 by reorganizing two departments (medical technology and nursing) of Kobe Tokiwa College. In 2012 the Department of Pedagogy (child education) of the college will be merged into the university to constitute the Faculty of Education.

== Organization ==
The university has no graduate schools yet (as of October 2011).

=== Undergraduate schools ===
- Faculty of Health Sciences
  - Department of Medical Technology
  - Department of Nursing

=== Affiliated schools ===
- Kobe Tokiwa College (junior college)
- Kobe Tokiwa Girls' High School
- Kindergarten
