= Japanese Red Cross Tohoku College of Nursing =

Coordinates: 39°41′8.8″N 140°9′17.3″E

The Japanese Red Cross Tohoku College of Nursing
- 日本赤十字東北看護大学
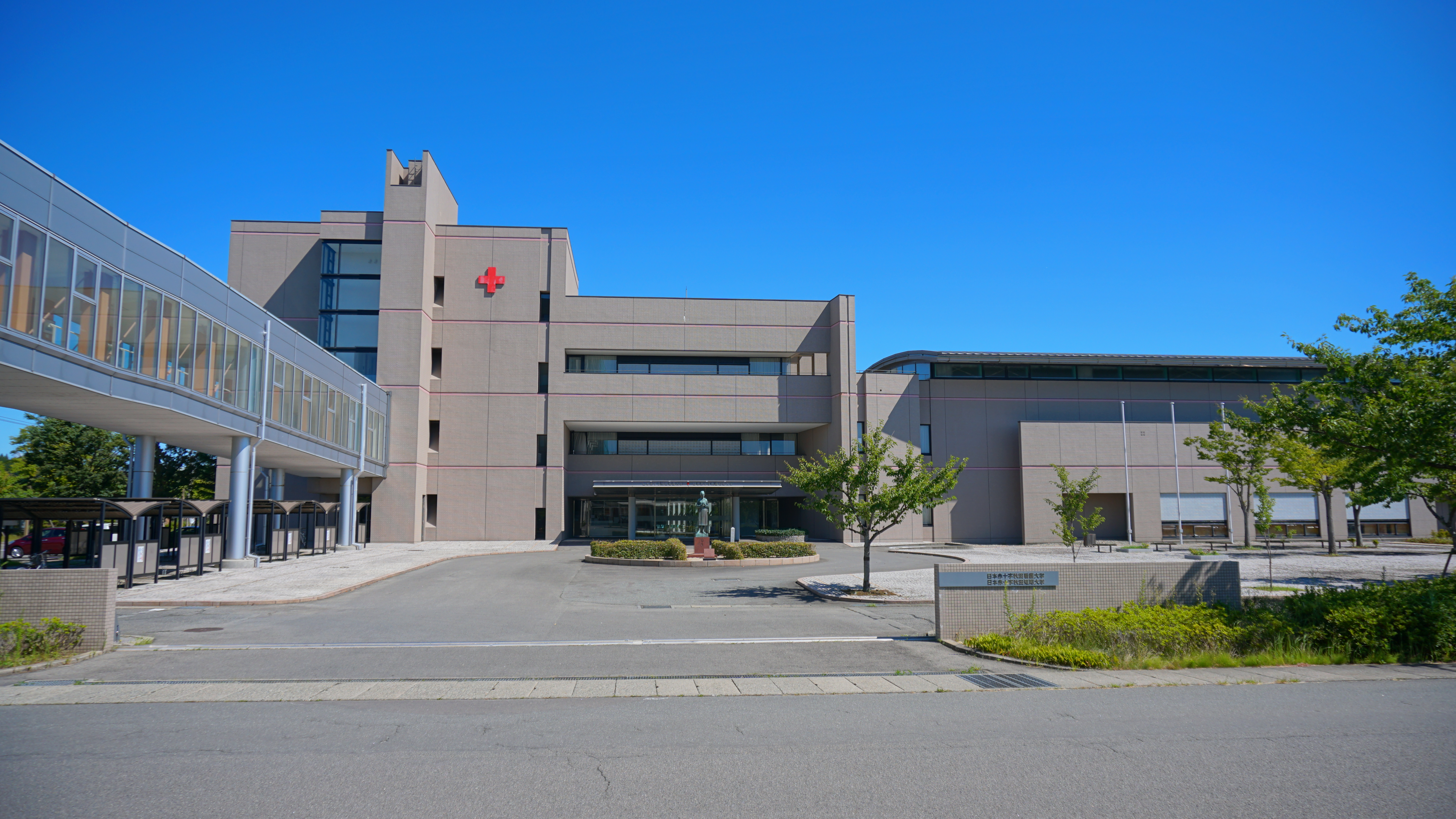
- Type: Private
- Established: 2009
- Affiliations: Japanese Red Cross
- Location: Akita, Akita Prefecture, Japan
- Website: www.rctohoku.ac.jp

The Japanese Red Cross Tohoku College of Nursing (日本赤十字東北看護大学, Nippon Sekijūji Tōhoku Kango Daigaku) is a private university located in the city of Akita, Akita Prefecture, Japan.

== Facilities ==
=== Undergraduate ===
- School of Nursing
  - Department of Nursing

=== Graduate ===
- Graduate School of Nursing

== History ==
The Akita branch of the Japanese Red Cross was established in 1896, with a hospital and nurse training school in 1914. It was renamed the Akita Red Cross Nursing School in 1976. The Japanese Red Cross Junior College of Akita was opened in 1996, but the four-year college was closed in March 1998. However, the four-year school reopened in April 2009 as the Japanese Red Cross Akita College of Nursing. A graduate program was established in 2011. The name was changed to its current name on April 1, 2025.
