= Niigata University of International and Information Studies =

Private university in Niigata, Niigata, Japan

Coordinates: 37°48′59.8″N 138°53′59.7″E

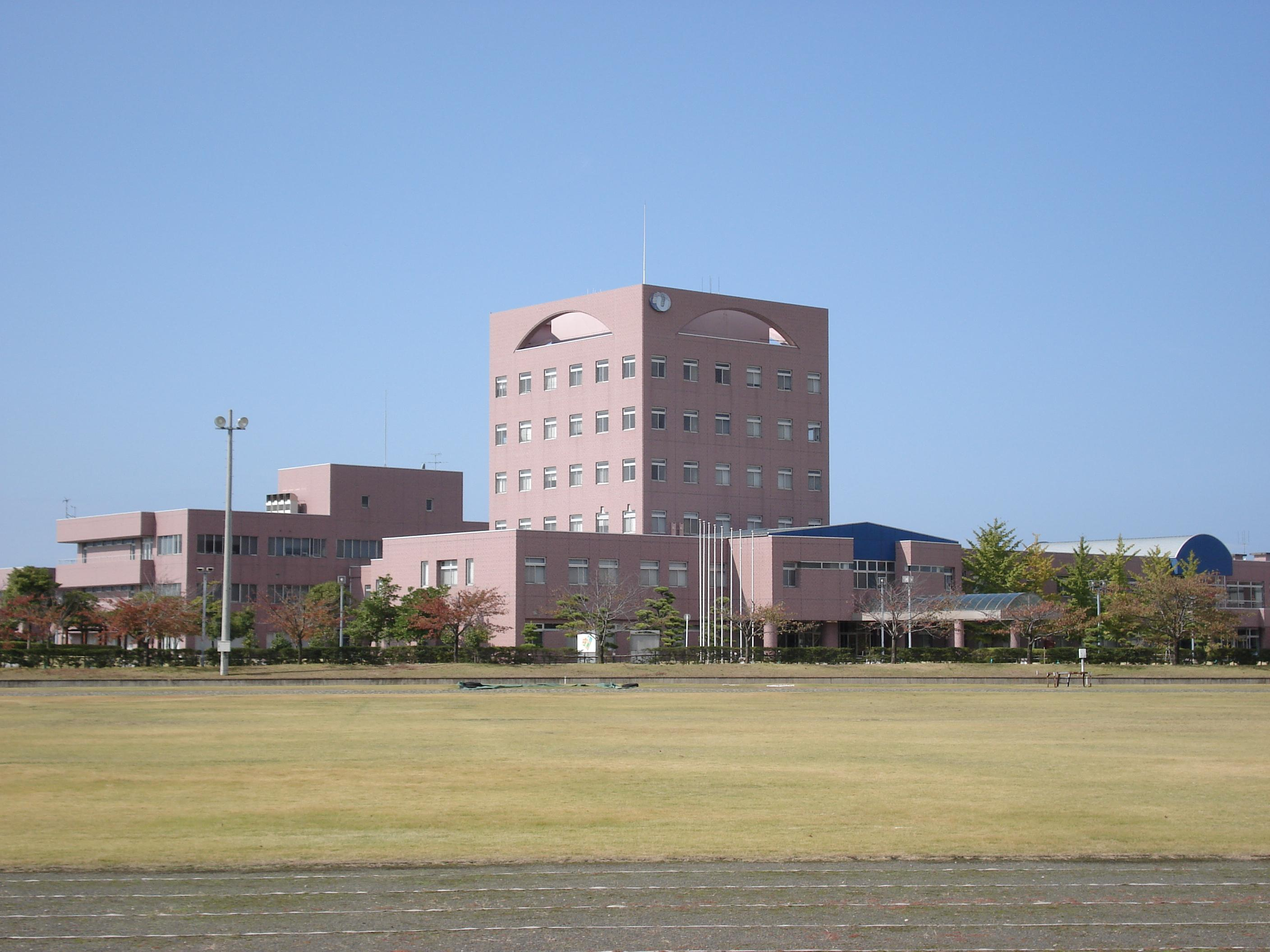
Niigata University of International and Information Studies

Niigata University of International and Information Studies (新潟国際情報大学, Niigata kokusai jōhō daigaku) is a private university in Niigata, Niigata, Japan. It was established in 1994.
