= Toyo River =

Toyo River 豊川
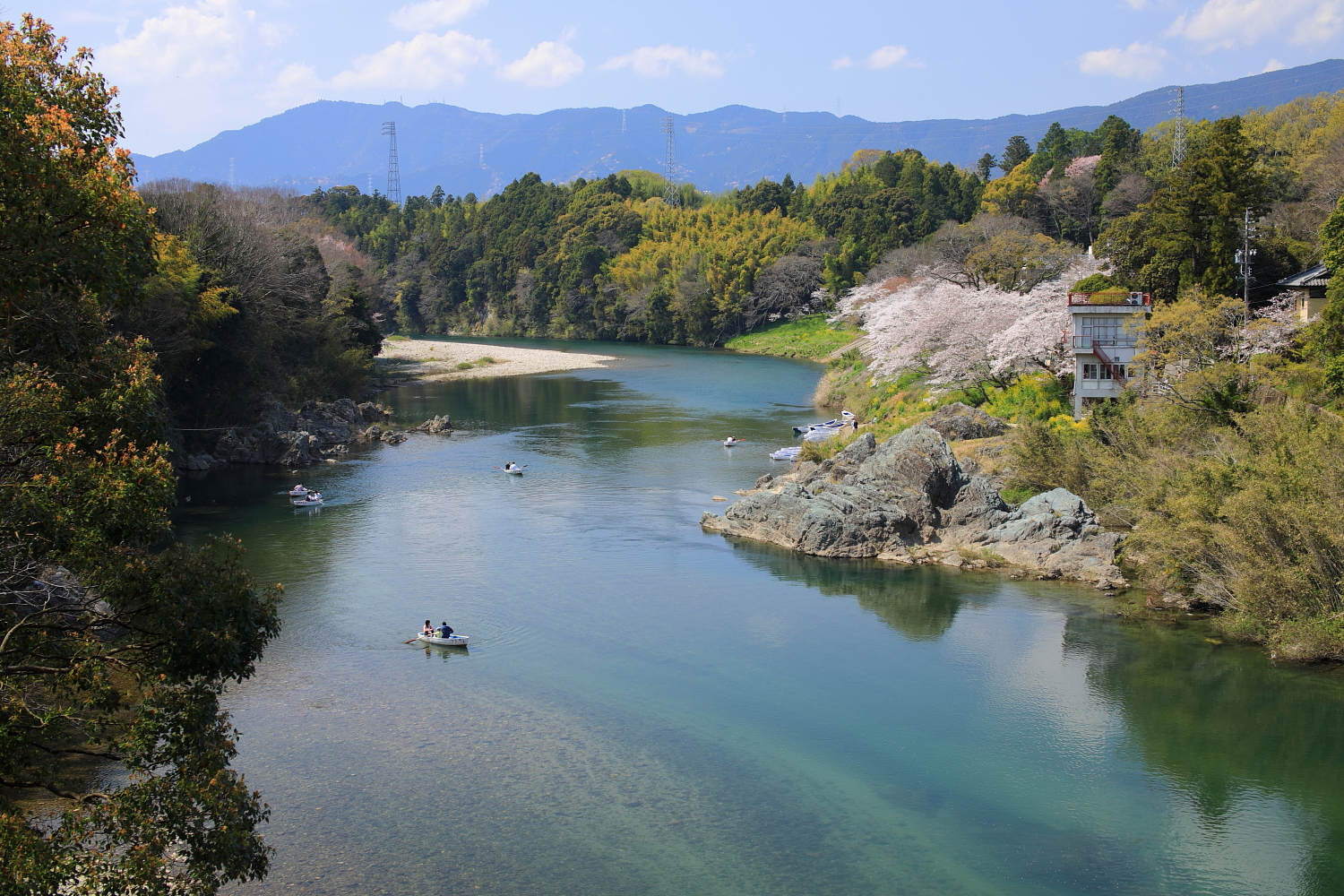
- Toyo River in 2019

Location
- Country: Japan
- State: Honshu
- Region: Aichi

Physical characteristics
- Source: Mount Takanosu (Kitashitara District, Aichi)
  - elevation: 1,152 m (3,780 ft)
- Mouth: Mikawa Bay
  - coordinates: 34°46′31″N 137°19′14″E
- Length: 77 km (48 mi)
- Basin size: 724 km^{2} (280 sq mi)

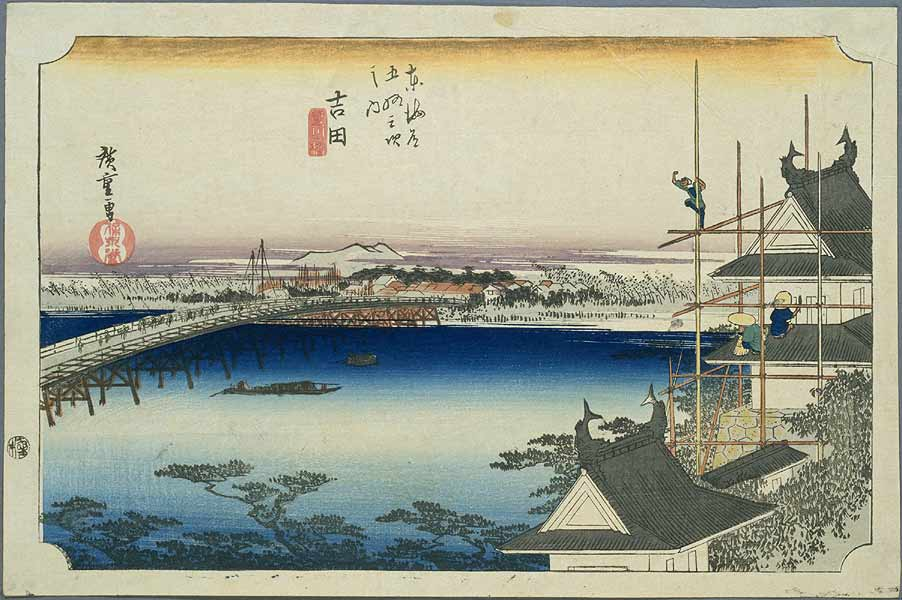
Hiroshige

The Toyo River is an A class river in Aichi Prefecture, Japan. It flows into the Pacific Ocean.

== See also ==
- Toyokawa Bridge
