= Chugoku Gakuen University =

Private university in Okayama, Japan

Coordinates: 34°39′05″N 133°50′59″E

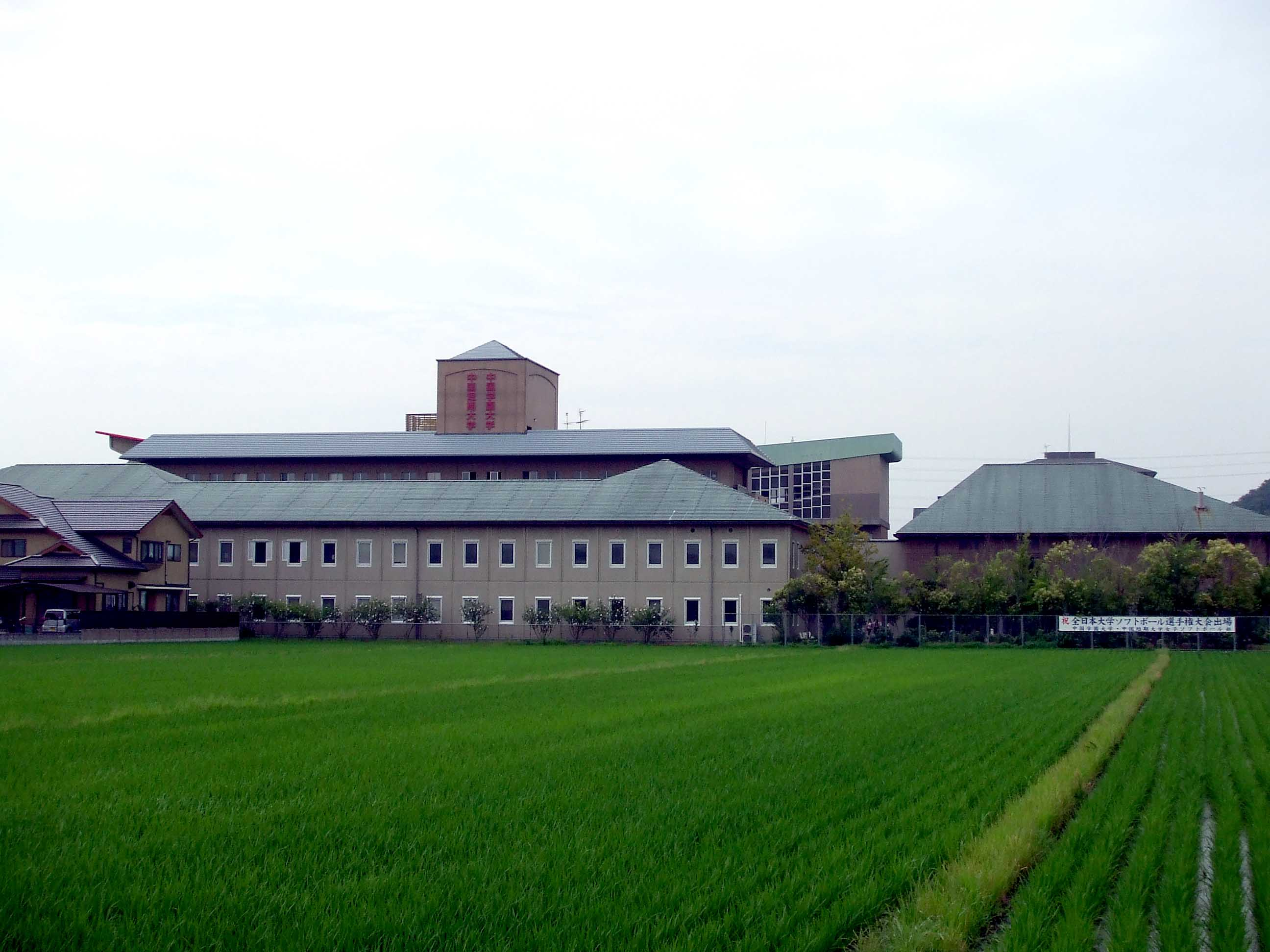
Chugoku Gakuen University

Chugoku Gakuen University (中国学園大学, Chūgoku gakuen daigaku) is a private university in Okayama, Okayama, Japan. The school first opened as Chugoku Junior College in 1962 and became a four-year college in 2002. It offers education in English and Japan language. Offered Faculties are: Education, Law, Business and Commercial, Engineering, Arts, Music, Medicine and Health Sciences, Sciences and Agriculture. It accepts both local and international students. the institution has a selective admission policy based on entrance examinations and students' past academic records and grades. It also provides several academic and non-academic facilities and services to students including a library, as well as administrative services.
