= Seirei Christopher University =

Private university in Hamamatsu City, Shizuoka

Coordinates: 34°47′35″N 137°41′31″E

- 聖隷クリストファー大学
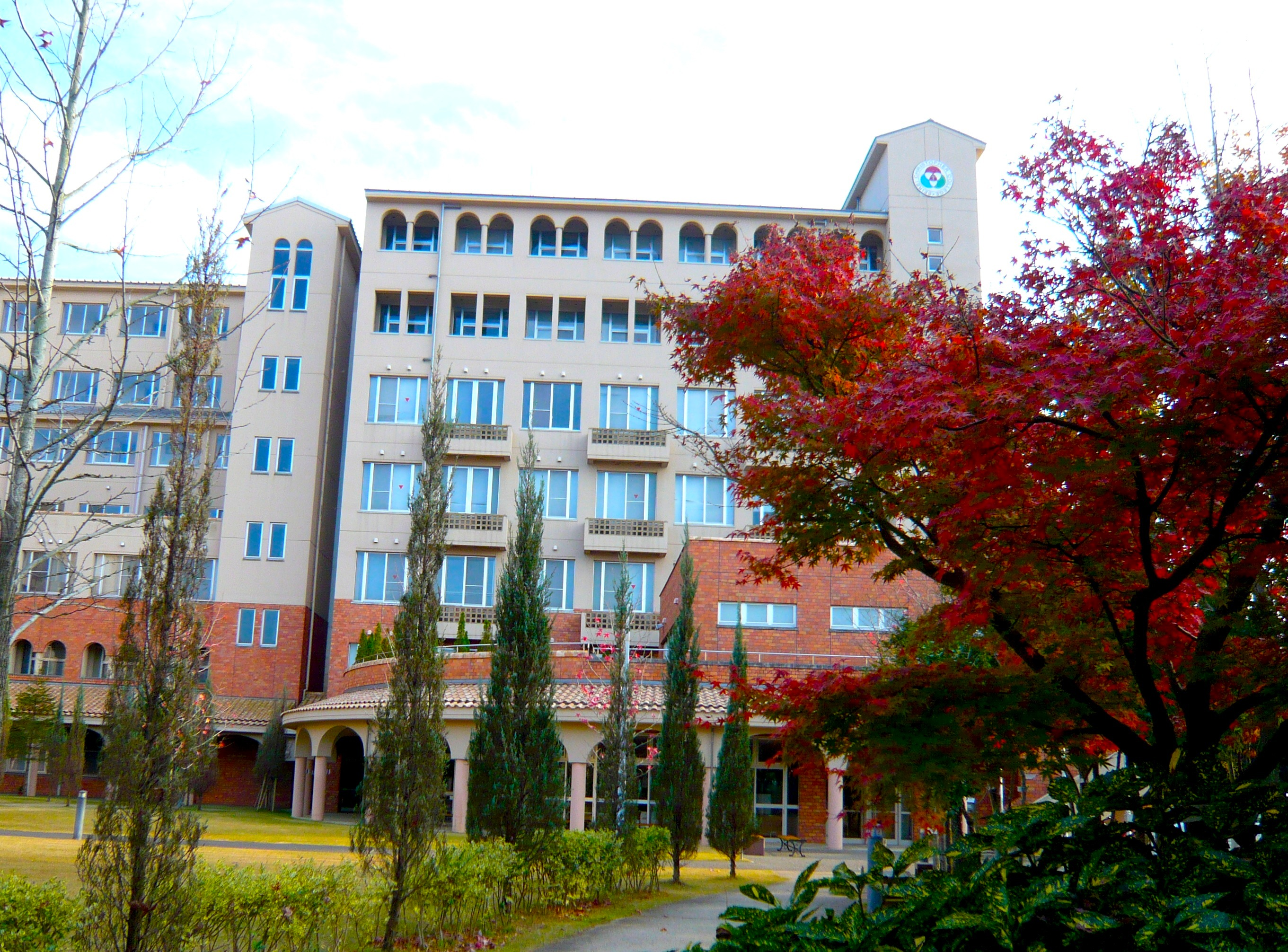
- Seirei Christopher University
- Type: Private
- Established: 1887; university from 2002
- Affiliations: Protestant
- Faculty: 293
- Students: 1359
- Undergraduates: 1314
- Postgraduates: 45
- Location: 3453 Mikatagahara, Chuo-ku, Hamamatsu City 422-8545, Hamamatsu, Shizuoka, Japan

Seirei Christopher University (聖隷クリストファー大学, Seirei Kurisutofa Daigaku) is a co-educational private university in Hamamatsu city, Shizuoka Prefecture Japan.

== History ==
Seirei Christopher University began as the “Bethel Home”, a private tuberculosis sanatorium established in 1932 by local Japanese Christians in Hamamatsu. From the beginning, the sanatorium faced difficulties with finances and hostility from its neighbors due to prejudices against tuberculosis sufferers and followers of Christianity. Although the sanatorium raised funds to acquire land outside of the city by 1937, it continued to experience problems due to the increasingly totalitarian attitude of the pre-war Japanese government. An unexpected donation on Christmas Day, 1939, directly from Emperor Hirohito, resolved both its financial issues and problems with the local government.

In the immediate postwar period, the sanatorium expanded into education by forming the “Enshū School of Christ”, the forerunner of both "Seirei Christopher High School" and "Seirei Christopher University" in 1949. Seeing the need for increased medical services in postwar Japan, the sanatorium created the "Seirei Vocational School for Practical Nurses" in 1952; it changed its name in 1969 to the "Seirei Gakuen Junior College of Nursing". In 1992, with the financial help of three billion yen from the Tokio Marine & Nichido Fire Insurance Company, a four-year "Seirei Christopher College of Nursing" was founded.

Seirei Christopher College of Nursing changed its name to "Seirei Christopher College" when the School of Social Work was established in 2002. The School of Social Work started a graduate studies program in April 2004. Also in 2004, the School of Rehabilitation Sciences was founded. In 2023, the School of International Education was established.

== Academic Programmes ==
- School of Nursing
  - Department of Nursing
    - Department of Nursing
    - Department of Public Health
    - Department of Midwifery
  - Graduate Programs of Nursing
- School of Rehabilitation Sciences
  - Department of Rehabilitation Sciences
    - Division of Physical Therapy
    - Division of Occupational Therapy
    - Division of Speech Therapy
  - Graduate Programs of Rehabilitation Sciences
- School of Social Work
  - Department of Social Work
    - Division of Care Work
    - Division of Social Work
  - Graduate Programs of Social Work
- School of International Education
  - Department of Child Education
