= Fuji Phoenix College =

Higher education institution in Shizuoka Prefecture, Japan

- 富士フェニックス短期大学
- Type: private
- Active: 1992–2001
- Location: Gotemba, Shizuoka, Shizuoka, Japan; 35.339732°N 138.885695°E
- Website: http://camp.ff.tku.ac.jp/YAMADA-P/labour/c-fujiphoenix.html

Fuji Phoenix College (富士フェニックス短期大学, Fuji Phoenix Tanki Daigaku) was a private junior college in Japan. It was located in Gotemba, Shizuoka. It was abolished in 2001.

== Department and Graduate Course ==
=== Departments ===
- Department of Japanese language and Japanese Literature
- Department of English and American literature

=== Advanced course ===
- None
