= Kyoto Saga University of Arts =

Coordinates: 35°0′46.2″N 135°41′17″E

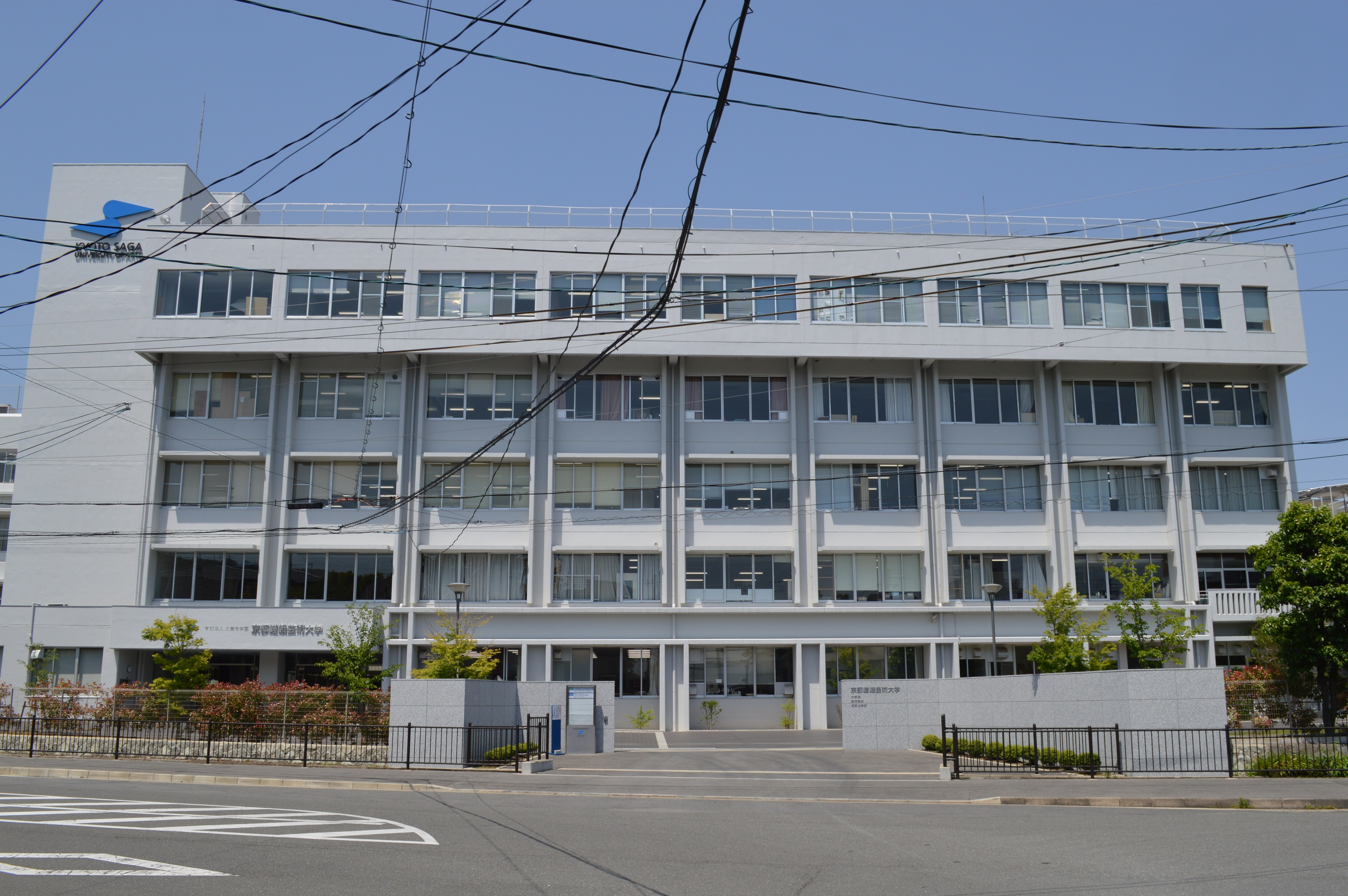
- Type: Private university
- Established: 2001
- Chancellor: Seison Hattori
- President: Takeshi Morimoto
- Location: Ukyō-ku, Kyoto, Kyoto, Japan
- Website: www.kyoto-saga.ac.jp

Kyoto Saga University of Arts (京都嵯峨芸術大学, Kyoto saga geijutsu daigaku) is a private university in Ukyo-ku, Kyoto, Kyoto, Japan. The school first opened as a junior college in 1971 and became a four-year college in 2001.
