= Nagaoka University =

Coordinates: 37°25′50″N 138°52′45″E

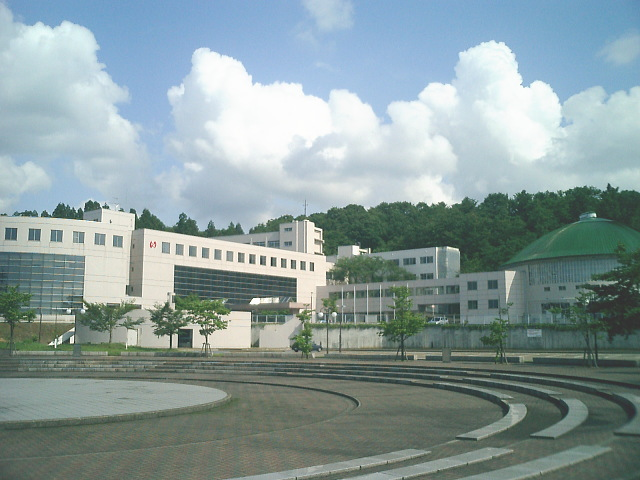
Nagaoka University

Nagaoka University (長岡大学, Nagaoka daigaku) is a private university in Nagaoka, Niigata, Japan. The predecessor of the school was founded in 1905. In 1971, the institution was reorganized as the Nagaoka Women's Junior College and in 1973 was chartered as a coeducational junior college. One of the first teachers of the Women's College was Kanai Yoshiko. In 2001 it became a four-year college.
