= Kyushu Nutrition Welfare University =

Private university in Kitakyushu, Fukuoka Prefecture, Japan

- 九州栄養福祉大学
- Type: Private, Research
- Established: 2001
- Accreditation: JIHEE
- President: Hirokazu Muroi
- Location: 5 Chome-1-1 Shimoitozu, Kokurakita Ward, Kitakyushu, Fukuoka 803-0846, Japan, Kitakyushu, Fukuoka, Japan; 33.876312°N 130.857562°E
- Campus: Urban
- Website: www.knwu.ac.jp

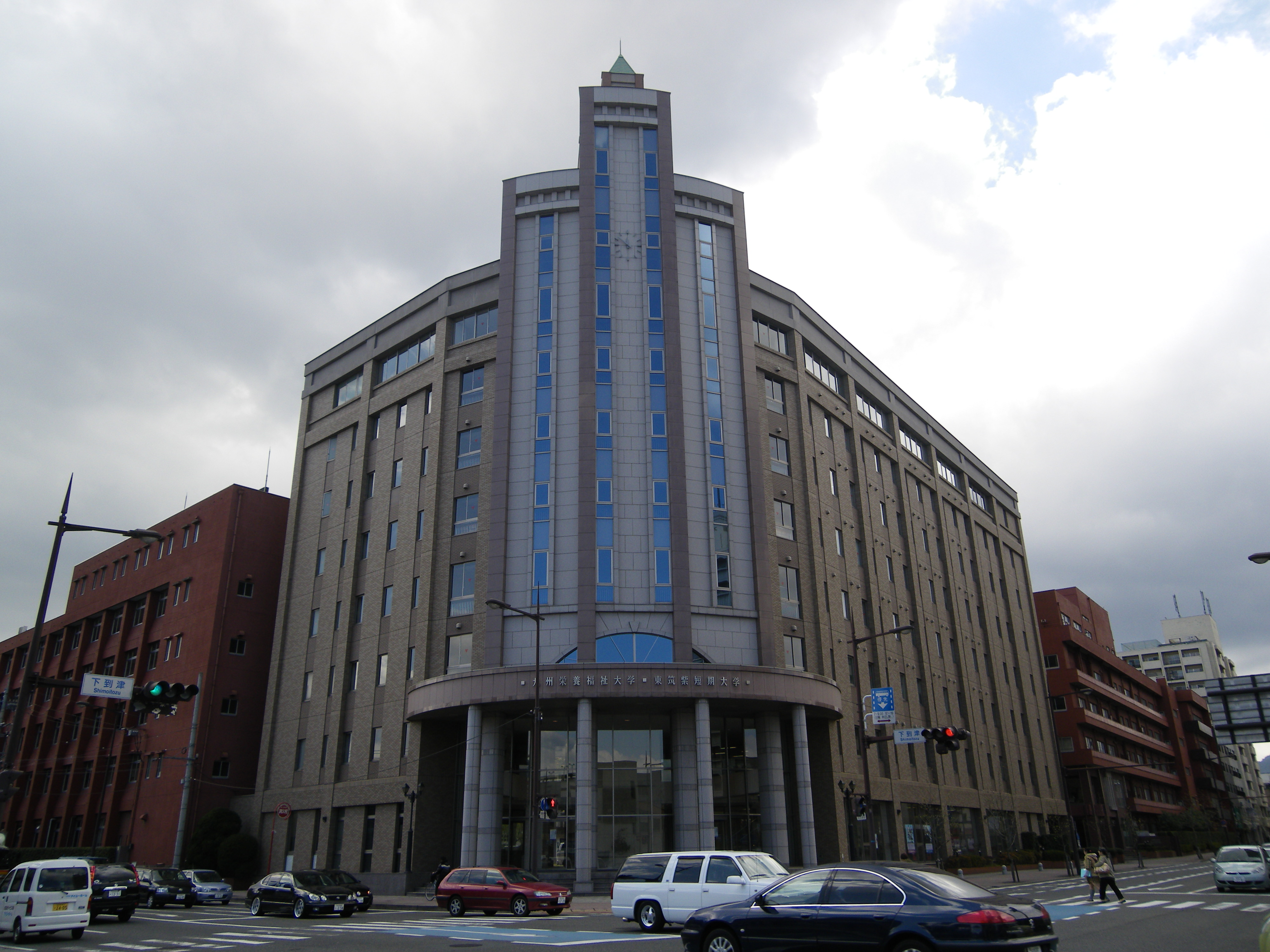
Kyushu Nutrition Welfare University

Kyushu Nutrition Welfare University (九州栄養福祉大学, Kyūshū eiyou fukushi daigaku) is a private university in Kitakyushu, Fukuoka, Japan, established in 2001.

== Academics ==
The university has three major academic departments:

- Department of Food and Nutrition
- Department of Physical Therapy
- Department of Occupational Therapy
