= Concho Valley =

Coordinates: 31.4032°N 100.4356°W

- Region
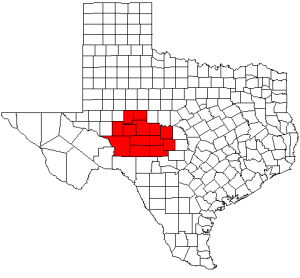
- Texas Counties in the Concho Valley
- Country: United States
- State: Texas
- Region: West Texas

Area
  - Total: 16,376 sq mi (42,410 km^{2})

Population
  - Total: 157,721
  - Density: 9.6312/sq mi (3.7186/km^{2})
- Area code: 325

The Concho Valley is a region in West Texas. The region takes its name from the Concho River ("shell" in Spanish), named due to its abundance of freshwater mussels in the river.

== Counties ==
There are variations of the region, but according to the Concho Valley Council of Governments, the Concho Valley consists of 13 counties encompassing an area of 16,376 square miles (42,414 km^{2}).

- Coke
- Concho
- Crockett
- Irion
- Kimble
- Mason
- McCulloch
- Menard
- Reagan
- Schleicher
- Sterling
- Sutton
- Tom Green

== Cities ==
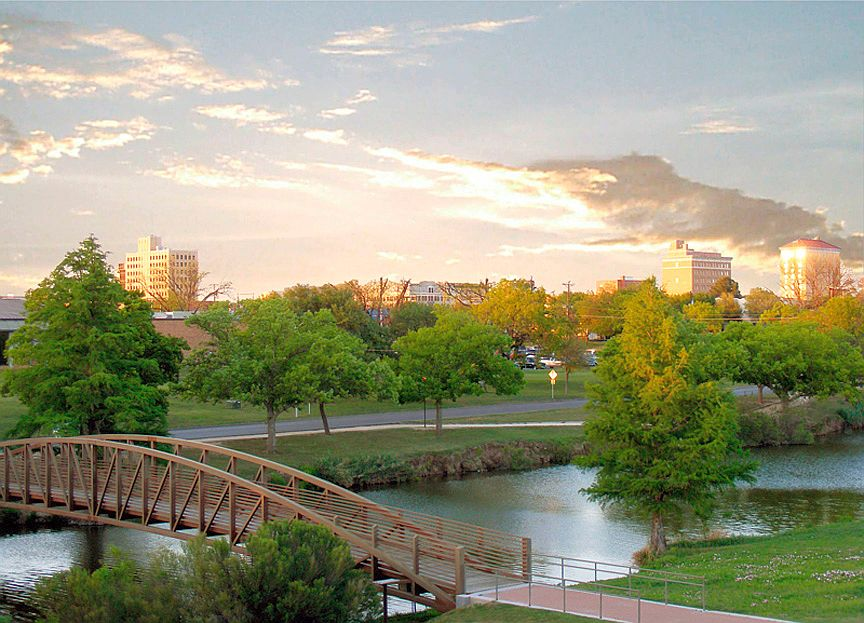
The Concho River running through a park in San Angelo.

With an estimated population of 97,492 in 2014, San Angelo is the principal city and center of the San Angelo metropolitan area.

== Geography ==
The Concho Valley is located in West Texas in an area from the southwestern reaches of the Edwards Plateau and the northeastern edge of the Chihuahuan desert. The North Concho River and South Concho River merge to form the Concho River in San Angelo.

== Identity ==
Many businesses and organizations use the term "Concho" or "Concho Valley", helping to form a regional identity in the area surrounding the Concho River. Some include the Boy Scouts of America Concho Valley Council, Concho Valley Council of Governments, Concho Valley Electric Cooperative, etc. The oldest is Fort Concho, built in 1867.

== See also ==
- List of geographical regions in Texas
- Edwards Plateau
- West Texas
