= O. C. Fisher =

American politician (1903–1994)

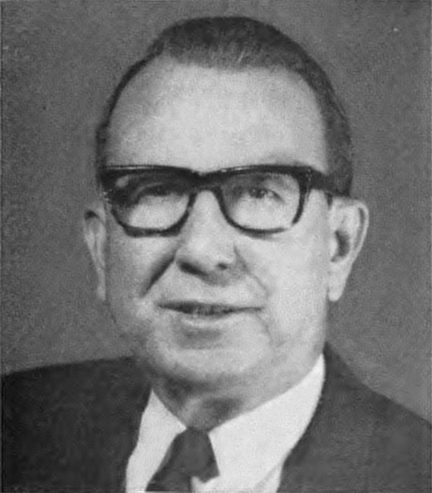

Member of the U.S. House of Representatives from Texas's 21st district
- In office January 3, 1943 – December 31, 1974
- Preceded by: Charles L. South
- Succeeded by: Bob Krueger

District attorney Texas 51st Judicial District
- In office 1937–1943

Member Texas House of Representatives 53rd District
- In office 1935–1937

County Attorney Tom Green County
- In office 1931–1935

Personal details
- Born: Ovie Clark Fisher; November 22, 1903 Junction, Texas, U.S.
- Died: December 9, 1994 (aged 91) Junction, Texas, U.S.
- Resting place: Junction Cemetery; Junction, Texas
- Party: Democratic
- Spouse: Marian E. De Walsh
- Children: Rhoda
- Education: University of Texas at Austin Baylor Law School
- Profession: Attorney

Ovie Clark Fisher (November 22, 1903 – December 9, 1994) was an attorney and non-academic historian who served for 32 years as the U.S. representative for Texas's 21st congressional district.

== Early life ==
Fisher was born in Junction in Kimble County, Texas to Jobe Bazilee and Rhoda Catherine Clark Fisher. He married Marian E. De Walsh on September 11, 1927. A daughter named Rhoda was the couple's only child.

Fisher attended University of Texas at Austin, University of Colorado at Boulder, and Baylor University at Waco, from which he received his LL.B. He was admitted to the bar in 1929.

== Career ==
Fisher practiced law in San Angelo in West Texas for two years. In 1931, he was elected county attorney for Tom Green County.

Fisher represented the 53rd District of Texas in the Texas House of Representatives from 1935 to 1937. From 1937 to 1943, Fisher was District Attorney for the 51st Judicial District of Texas.

In 1942, he was elected to the United States House of Representatives as a Democrat and served in the 78th Congress to the 93rd Congress. He was reelected 14 times, only facing nominal opposition the first 13 times.

In 1972, however, Republican Doug Harlan held Fisher to 57 percent of the general election vote despite spending almost no money. Paul Burka of Texas Monthly said Harlan's success was "one of the first indications that the dominance of the rural conservative Democrats in Texas politics could not be sustained." With Harlan priming for a rematch in 1974, Fisher opted against a 16th term.

Fisher was one of five U.S. representatives from Texas to sign the "Southern Manifesto" in protest of the US Supreme Court's decision in Brown v. Board of Education. Fisher voted against the Civil Rights Acts of 1957, the Civil Rights Acts of 1960, the Civil Rights Acts of 1964, and the Civil Rights Acts of 1968 as well as the 24th Amendment to the U.S. Constitution and the Voting Rights Act of 1965.

After heart surgery in 1973, Fisher announced that he would not be stand for re-election in 1974. His party nominated Robert Krueger as his successor, who defeated Harlan, who made his second and last race for Congress.

Fisher died on December 9, 1994.

== Legacy ==
Baylor University is the repository for the O.C. Fisher Papers.

In 1975, San Angelo Lake, a reservoir managed by the United States Army Corps of Engineers was renamed O.C. Fisher Reservoir in his honor. San Angelo State Park is on the shores of the reservoir.

== Fraternal memberships ==
Fisher had membership in the following organizations:

- Freemasons
- Order of the Eastern Star
- Knights of Pythias
- Rotary International
- Acacia fraternity

== Works ==
- Fisher, O.C. (1937). It Occurred in Kimble The Story of a Texas County. Anson Jones Press. ASIN: B001KCW7DU.
- Members of the Potomac Corral of the Westerners, (O.C. Fisher) (1960). Great Western Indian Fights. University of Nebraska Press. ISBN 0-585-32514-6.
- Fisher, O.C. (1963). The Texas Heritage of the Fishers and the Clarks. Anson Jones Press. ASIN: B0007E8BS2.
- Fisher, O.C.; Dykes, J.C. (1967). King Fisher: His Life and Times. University of Oklahoma Press. ISBN 0-8061-0711-1.
- Fisher, O.C. (1978). Cactus Jack : A Biography of John Nance Garner. Texian Press. ISBN 978-0-87244-066-1.
- Fisher, O.C. (1980). From New Deal to Watergate. Texian Press. ASIN: B0006XMO1O.
- Fisher, O.C. (1980). Political Miscellany. Texian Press. ASIN: B0006E26IO.
- Fisher, O.C.; Pope, Jack; Anderson, Gertrude; Gillman, Geneva (1988). John Berry and His Children. Jack Pope. ISBN 978-0-9621053-0-2.
- O.C., Fisher (1985). The Speaker of Nubbin Ridge: The Story of the Modern Angora Goat. Talley Press. ASIN: B000712VUO.

== Sources ==
- United States Congress. "O. C. Fisher (id: F000152)". Biographical Directory of the United States Congress.

U.S. House of Representatives
| Preceded by Charles L. South | Member of the U.S. House of Representatives from Texas's 21st congressional district January 3, 1943 - December 31, 1974 | Succeeded by Bob Krueger |
