= San Angelo metropolitan area =

- Metropolitan Statistical Area
- San Angelo, TX MSA
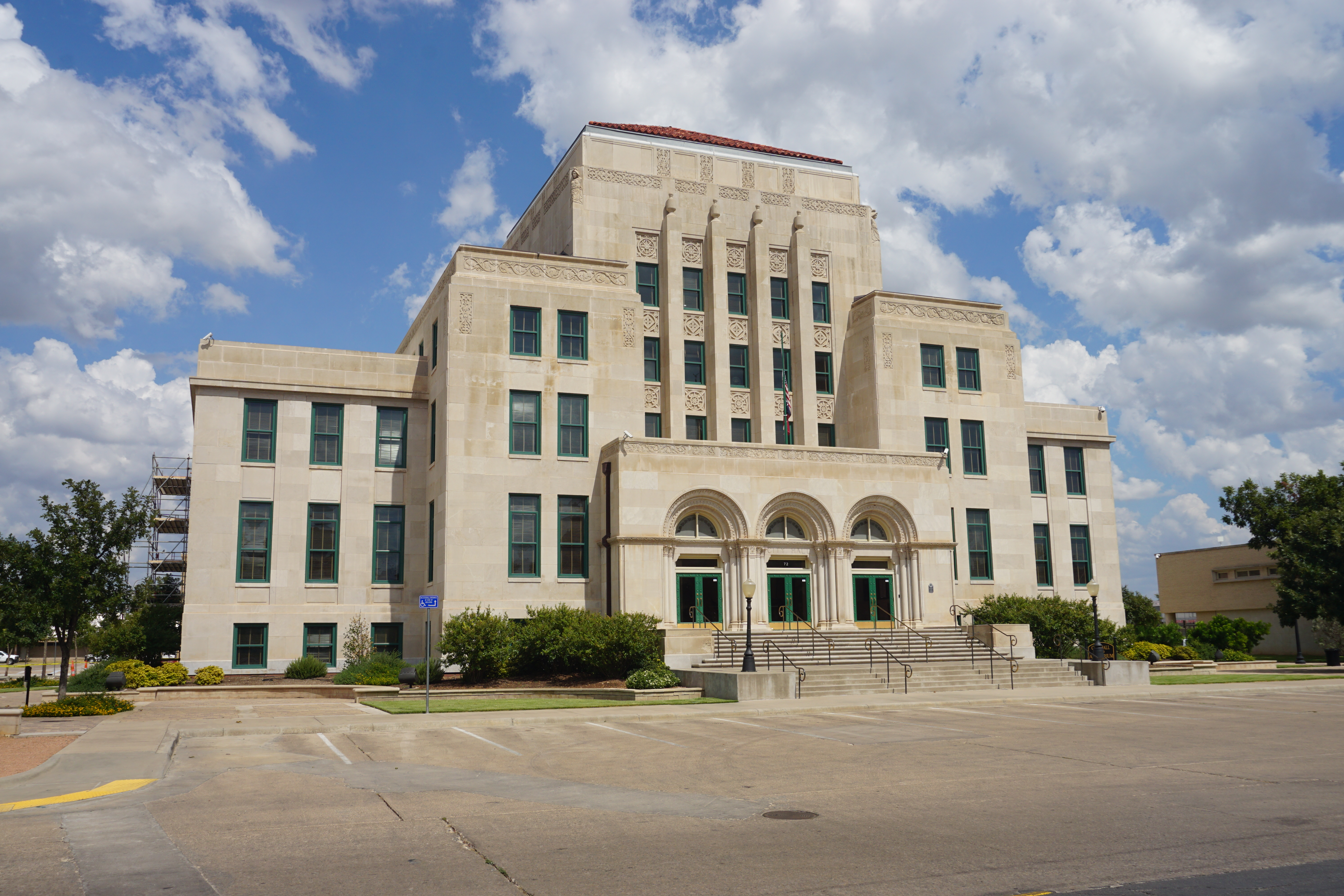
- San Angelo City Hall
Interactive Map of San Angelo, TX CSA
City of San Angelo
San Angelo, TX MSA
- Country: United States
- State: Texas
- Largest city: San Angelo
- Time zone: UTC-6 (CST)
  - Summer (DST): UTC-5 (CDT)

The San Angelo metropolitan statistical area (MSA) is a metropolitan area in West Texas that covers two counties - Tom Green and Irion. As of the 2010 census, the MSA had a population of 111,823, with a 2014 estimate of 118,182.

== Counties ==
- Irion
- Tom Green

== Communities ==
=== Cities ===
- San Angelo (principal city)
- Mertzon

=== Census-designated places ===
- Christoval
- Grape Creek

=== Unincorporated places ===
- Barnhart
- Carlsbad
- Knickerbocker
- Sherwood
- Tankersley
- Vancourt
- Veribest
- Wall
- Water Valley

== Demographics ==
As of the census of 2020, 122,888 people, 47,794 households, and 28,198 families were residing within the MSA. The racial makeup of the MSA was 65.8% White (non-Hispanic White 52.4%), 3.7% African American, 0.9% Native American, 1.5% Asian, and 17.6% from other races. Hispanics or Latinos of any race were 38.9% of the population.

== See also ==
- List of cities in Texas
- List of museums in West Texas
- Texas census statistical areas
- List of Texas metropolitan areas
