= Concho Valley Council of Governments =

- Logo

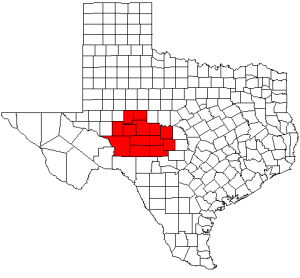
- Map of Texas highlighting counties served by the Concho Valley Council of Governments
- Formation: May 1967
- Type: Voluntary association of governments
- Region served: 16,376 sq mi (42,410 km^{2})
- Members: 14 counties

Historical population
| Year | Pop. | ±% |
|---|---|---|
| 2000 | 148,212 | — |
| 2010 | 154,192 | +4.0% |
| 2020 | 159,613 | +3.5% |

The Concho Valley Council of Governments (CVCOG) is a voluntary association of cities, counties and special districts in West Texas, United States.

Based in San Angelo, the Concho Valley Council of Governments is a member of the Texas Association of Regional Councils.

State Representative Andrew Murr of Junction is the former chairman of the CVCOG executive committee.

== Counties served ==
- Coke
- Concho
- Crockett
- Edwards
- Irion
- Kimble
- Mason
- McCulloch
- Menard
- Reagan
- Schleicher
- Sterling
- Sutton
- Tom Green

== Largest cities in the region ==
- San Angelo
- Brady
- Big Lake
- Junction
- Mason
- Sonora
