= Harriett, Texas =

Harriett
- Unincorporated community
- Location within the state of Texas Harriett (the United States)
- Coordinates: 31°32′50″N 100°19′7″W
- Country: United States
- State: Texas
- County: Tom Green
- Time zone: UTC-6 (Central (CST))
  - Summer (DST): UTC-5 (CDT)
- GNIS feature ID: 1379899

Harriett, is an unincorporated community in northeastern Tom Green County in the U.S. state of Texas. It is part of the San Angelo, Texas Metropolitan Statistical Area and is situated next to U.S. Highway 67.

A post office was established in 1909 in what would later be Harriett, with Charles P. Lovelace as postmaster. A month later, the post office changed its name from Harriet to Harriett and continued to serve the area until it was moved to San Angelo in 1927. The community reported a population of 12 and two businesses in 1936, and county maps of the 1950s showed a church and several buildings there. Harriett was shown on the 1984 county highway map with a railroad station and, two miles to the northeast, a cemetery.
