= KSJT =

KSJT may refer to:

- KSJT-FM, a radio station (107.5 FM) licensed to San Angelo, Texas, United States
- San Angelo Regional Airport (ICAO code KSJT)
