= Knickerbocker, Texas =

Unincorporated community in Tom Green County, Texas, United States

Knickerbocker
- Unincorporated community
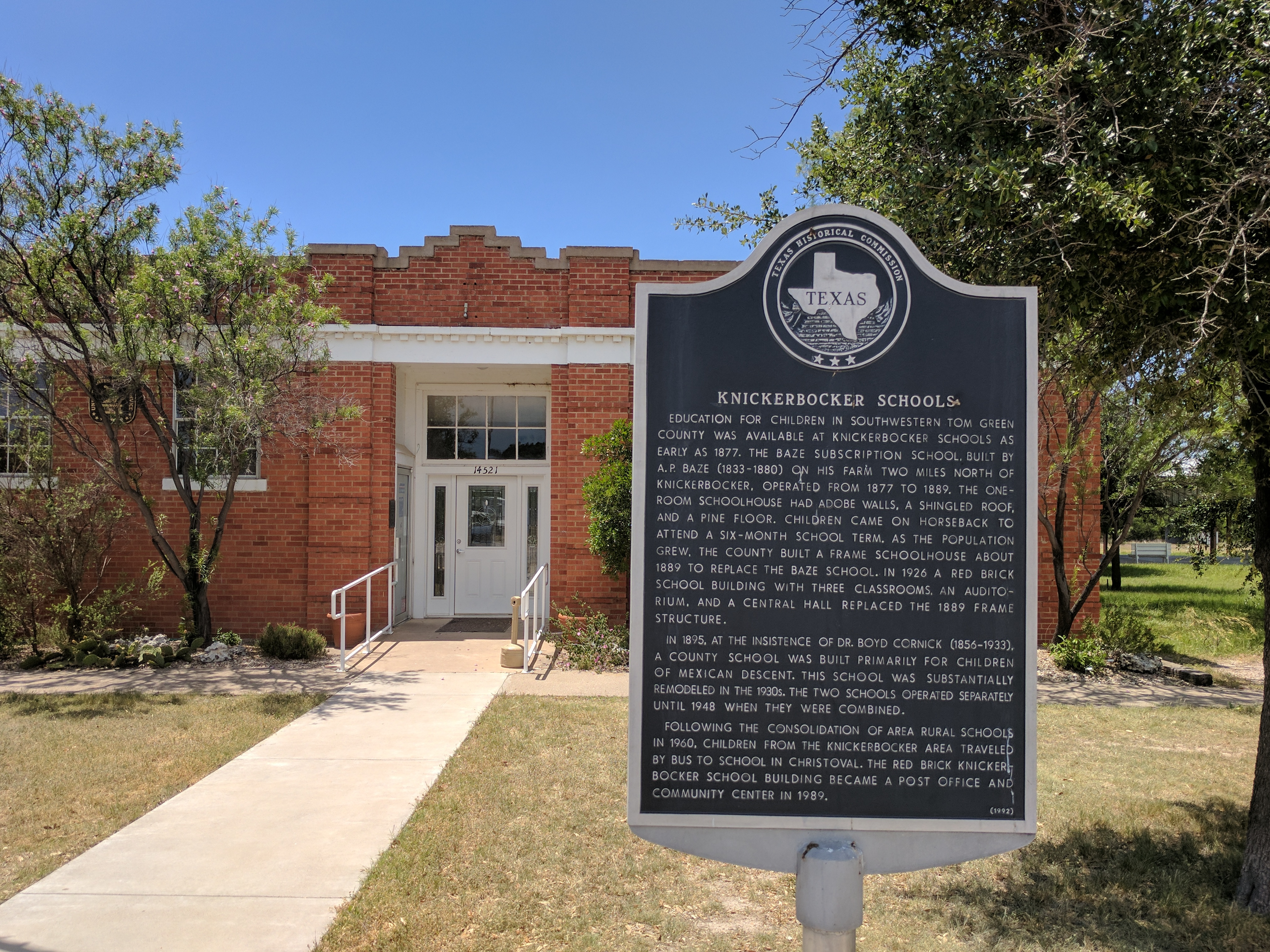
- Knickerbocker Community Center, May 2017

- Location within the state of Texas Knickerbocker (the United States)
- Coordinates: 31°16′0″N 100°37′23″W
- Country: United States
- State: Texas
- County: Tom Green
- Elevation: 2,051 ft (625 m)
- Time zone: UTC-6 (Central (CST))
  - Summer (DST): UTC-5 (CDT)
- ZIP codes: 76939
- GNIS feature ID: 1360716

Knickerbocker is an unincorporated community in southwestern Tom Green County, Texas, United States. It lies along Farm to Market Road 2335, southwest of the city of San Angelo, the county seat of Tom Green County. Its elevation is 2,051 feet (625 m). Although Knickerbocker is unincorporated, it has a post office, with the ZIP code of 76939.

== History ==
Named for Washington Irving's character Diedrich Knickerbocker by early settlers related to Irving, the community quickly became significant, being the most important community in the county aside from San Angelo. Agriculture was long the community's mainstay, between grain farming and sheep ranching.

Knickerbocker Ranch was established in 1877 when Joseph Tweedy, E. Morgan Grinnell, Lawrence Leslie Grinnell, and Joel Barlow Reynolds drove Mexican sheep into the valley from their camp near Fort Clark. The first townsite was established along Dove Creek, about one kilometer east of the Dove Creek Battlefield. In 1882, at the invitation of George Ward Holdrege, Joel Barlow Reynolds (father of Samuel W Reynolds) moved to Nebraska to help expand the Burlington and Missouri River Railroad Company throughout the northern Great Plains states.

Knickerbocker's post office was established in 1881 and rebuilt in 1896 and 1936. The community was moved in 1889 around a nearby hill to have better access to water. Local children were able to attend school in Knickerbocker starting in 1889, but the school was closed and merged into Christoval's system in 1956.

== Notable person ==
- Laura Bullion (1876 – 1961) was an outlaw of the Old West and a member of Butch Cassidy's Wild Bunch
