= Kickapoo Creek =

Kickapoo Creek may refer to:

- Kickapoo Creek (Texas)
- Kickapoo Creek (Peoria County, Illinois)
- Kickapoo Creek (McLean County, Illinois)
