= Vancourt =

Vancourt may refer to:

- Randy Vancourt, Canadian composer and musician
- Vancourt, Texas, unincorporated community in the United States
