= Aebersold =

Aebersold is a surname of German and Swiss origin. People with this surname include:

- Christian Aebersold (born 1962), Swiss orienteer
- Jamey Aebersold (born 1939), American jazz saxophonist
- Jane Ford Aebersold (born 1941), American ceramist
- Niki Aebersold (born 1972), Swiss cyclist
- Ruedi Aebersold (born 1954), Swiss biologist
- Simona Aebersold (born 1998), Swiss orienteer
