= Cristina Martínez =

Cristina Martínez may refer to:

- Cristina Martínez (canoeist) (born 1972), Spanish canoeist
- Cristina Martínez (cyclist) (born 1996), Spanish cyclist
- Cristina Martinez (singer), vocalist for Boss Hog
- Cristina E. Martinez, LGBT activist in Texas
- Cristina Martinez (chef), chef in Philadelphia
- Cristina Martínez (gymnast), Spanish rhythmic gymnast
