= Veribest, Texas =

Veribest
- Unincorporated community
- Location within the state of Texas Veribest (the United States)
- Coordinates: 31°28′36″N 100°15′34″W
- Country: United States
- State: Texas
- County: Tom Green
- Time zone: UTC-6 (Central)
  - Summer (DST): UTC-5 (CDT)
- GNIS feature ID: 1370620

Veribest is an unincorporated community in Tom Green County, Texas, United States. According to the Handbook of Texas, the community had an estimated population of 40 in 2000. It is part of the San Angelo, Texas, Metropolitan Statistical Area.

== Geography ==
Veribest was founded by Brody Caldwell and is situated 11 miles east of San Angelo along FM 380 in eastern Tom Green County.

=== Climate ===
The climate in this area is characterized by hot, humid summers and generally mild to cool winters. According to the Köppen climate classification system, Veribest has a humid subtropical climate, Cfa on climate maps.

== History ==
The area was initially settled by Isaac "Ike" Mullins some time before 1875, although a community did not begin to form until the early 1900s. The settlement was first known as Mullins, but the name was changed to Veribest when the locals requested a post office in 1926. The name change was needed because another community in the state already had a similar name – Mullin in Mills County. The name "Veribest" was chosen by a young woman named Sue Rister, who was asked by the mayor, in a grocery store, to choose the town's new name. She saw a jar of Veribest mayonnaise and thought it would be a good name for a town. Veribest was a brand name used by Armour & Company for canned meats and preserves.

Veribest grew during the 1930s and 1940s, with around 1,000 people living in the community. The population began to decline after World War II as residents left to seek greater employment opportunities elsewhere. During the latter half of the 20th century, the number of people living in the Veribest area remained steady at 40.

As of 2026, Veribest was home to two churches (United Methodist and Baptist), several businesses, a post office (zip code: 76886), and a PK-12 school.

== Education ==
Public education in the community of Veribest is provided by the Veribest Independent School District.
