= Kickapoo Creek (Texas) =

Location
- Country: United States
- State: Texas

Physical characteristics
- Source
  - location: Schleicher County
  - coordinates: 31°04′53″N 100°17′00″W
  - elevation: 2,220 ft (680 m)
- Mouth
  - location: Concho County
  - coordinates: 31°30′47″N 99°57′37″W
  - elevation: 1,594 ft (486 m)

Kickapoo Creek is a stream in Schleicher, Tom Green, and Concho Counties in west-central Texas. It is a tributary of the Concho River.

== See also ==
- List of rivers of Texas
