= Carlsbad, Texas =

Carlsbad
- Unincorporated community and census-designated place
- Location within the state of Texas Carlsbad (the United States)
- Coordinates: 31°36′41″N 100°38′26″W
- Country: United States
- State: Texas
- County: Tom Green

Area
  - Total: 1.6 sq mi (4.1 km^{2})
  - Land: 1.6 sq mi (4.1 km^{2})
  - Water: 0 sq mi (0.0 km^{2})
- Elevation: 2,024 ft (617 m)

Population (2010)
  - Total: 719
  - Density: 450/sq mi (180/km^{2})
- Time zone: UTC-6 (Central (CST))
  - Summer (DST): UTC-5 (CDT)
- ZIP codes: 76934
- FIPS code: 48-12892
- GNIS feature ID: 1353826

Carlsbad is a census-designated place and unincorporated community in northwestern Tom Green County, Texas, United States. It lies along U.S. Route 87, northwest of the city of San Angelo, the county seat of Tom Green County. Its elevation is 2,024 feet (617 m). Although Carlsbad is unincorporated, it has a post office, with the ZIP code of 76934.

This was a new CDP for the 2010 census. As of the 2020 census, Carlsbad had a population of 622.

Located along the North Concho River, Carlsbad was founded in 1907 under the name of Hughes. When the Post Office required the community to be renamed, residents chose the name of the spa town of Karlsbad in Bohemia, after local wells were discovered to yield mineral water.

== Geography ==
Carlsbad is located at 31°36′41″N 100°38′26″W (31.611248, -100.640647). The CDP has a total area of 1.6 square miles (4.1 km^{2}), all land.

== Demographics ==
Historical population
Census	Pop.	Note	%±
2010	719		—
2020	622		−13.5%
U.S. Decennial Census; 1850–1900 1910; 1920 1930 1940; 1950 1960 1970; 1980 1990 2000; 2010 2020

Carlsbad first appeared as a census designated place in the 2010 U.S. census.

=== 2020 census ===
Carlsbad CDP, Texas – Racial and ethnic composition Note: the US Census treats Hispanic/Latino as an ethnic category. This table excludes Latinos from the racial categories and assigns them to a separate category. Hispanics/Latinos may be of any race.
Race / Ethnicity (NH = Non-Hispanic)	Pop 2010	Pop 2020	% 2010	% 2020
White alone (NH)	520	396	72.32%	63.67%
Black or African American alone (NH)	42	39	5.84%	6.27%
Native American or Alaska Native alone (NH)	3	2	0.42%	0.32%
Asian alone (NH)	0	5	0.00%	0.80%
Native Hawaiian or Pacific Islander alone (NH)	0	0	0.00%	0.00%
Other race alone (NH)	1	1	0.14%	0.16%
Mixed race or Multiracial (NH)	32	26	4.45%	4.18%
Hispanic or Latino (any race)	121	153	16.83%	24.60%
Total	719	622	100.00%	100.00%

As of the 2020 United States census, there were 622 people, 133 households, and 75 families residing in the CDP.
