= Christoval, Texas =

- CDP
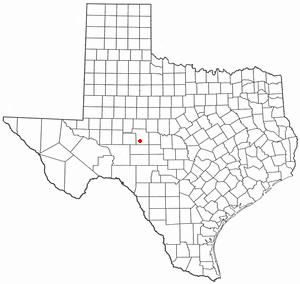
- Location of Christoval, Texas

- Coordinates: 31°11′51″N 100°29′36″W
- Country: United States
- State: Texas
- County: Tom Green

Area
  - Total: 1.3 sq mi (3.4 km^{2})
  - Land: 1.3 sq mi (3.4 km^{2})
  - Water: 0 sq mi (0.0 km^{2})
- Elevation: 2,037 ft (621 m)

Population (2020)
  - Total: 482
  - Density: 370/sq mi (140/km^{2})
- Time zone: UTC-6 (Central (CST))
  - Summer (DST): UTC-5 (CDT)
- ZIP code: 76935
- Area code: 325
- FIPS code: 48-14872
- GNIS feature ID: 1354482

Christoval is a census-designated place (CDP) in Tom Green County, Texas, United States. As of the 2020 census, Christoval had a population of 482. It is part of the San Angelo, Texas, metropolitan statistical area.

== Geography ==
Christoval is located at 31°11′51″N 100°29′36″W (31.197614, -100.493296). It is situated about 20 miles south of San Angelo in southern Tom Green County around the area of Loop 110, U.S. Highway 277, and Ranch to Market Road 2084.

According to the United States Census Bureau in 2000, the CDP has a total area of 1.2 sq mi (3.1 km^{2}), all land. Prior to the 2010 census, the CDP gained area, increasing to a total area of 1.3 sq mi (3.4 km^{2}), all land as before.

The South Concho River runs through Christoval, and serves as a water supply to the surrounding area. It was the location of a resort from the 1930s to the early 1960s, near where U.S. 277 crosses the river.

== History ==
The community, which has also been known as South Concho and Delong, is said to be named after early settler Christopher Columbus Doty. A post office was established in 1889, and a local school was operating by 1901. By 1914, Christoval had an estimated population of 200, two general stores, and a newspaper – the Christoval Observer. Through the 1930s, a Baptist encampment was held annually that attracted as many as 10,000 persons to the South Concho River area, and the mineral waters in nearby Christoval also attracted visitors and settlers.

On September 17, 1936, a devastating flood hit the South Concho River. The flood destroyed the Baptist encampment facility, and parts of Christoval. Several people were killed in the flood, as they were swept away by the rapidly rising water. Following the flood, the encampment facilities were never rebuilt, and the property eventually became a public park.

Playland Park was a popular local attraction from the 1950s through the 1980s. The park offered public access to the river, as well as boat rentals, a rope bridge, tree swings, and a concession stand. At its peak in the 1970s, the facility had amusement park rides and a small train. The facility was closed in the 1980s due to liability concerns and smaller crowds. Today, Pugh River Park and the historic, low-water river crossing on Loop 110 offer public access to the South Concho River.

The population peaked at approximately 500 in the 1930s before declining to about 400 in the mid-1950s, and 200 by the mid-1970s. The rerouting of U.S. Highway 277 in 1987 was expected to bring a further decline, but the population was not significantly impacted by the change. In 2000, 29 businesses were operating in Christoval.

== Notable people ==
Christoval is the hometown of Jack Pardee, a former American football linebacker and the only head coach to lead teams in college football, the NFL, the United States Football League, and the Canadian Football League. Pardee was inducted into the College Football Hall of Fame as a player in 1986. He was an All-American linebacker at Texas A&M University and a two-time All-Pro with the Los Angeles Rams (1963) and the Washington Redskins (1971).

Christoval is also hometown to reality TV personality Colby Donaldson, who appeared in several seasons of the CBS show Survivor.

== Local attractions ==
The South Concho River runs through Christoval, and around three-quarters of a mile of riverfront is part of a public park. The shoreline in this area is covered by large oak trees, and the trees have rope swings for visitors. This park, known as Pugh River Park, has visitors from across West Texas each weekend. Crowds over 500 people are not uncommon on the weekends in the summer.

Public access to the South Concho River is also available at the Mineral Wells crossing, about a mile north of Christoval.

Each Memorial Day weekend, the community of Christoval holds Old Toenail Trail days, which attracts visitors from around the region. Festivities include live music, parades, and food and craft vendors.

== Demographics ==
Historical population
Census	Pop.	Note	%±
2000	422		—
2010	504		19.4%
2020	482		−4.4%
U.S. Decennial Census; 1850–1900 1910; 1920 1930 1940; 1950 1960 1970; 1980 1990 2000; 2010

Christoval first appeared as a census designated place in the 2000 U.S. census.

=== 2020 census ===
Christoval CDP, Texas – Racial and ethnic composition Note: the US Census treats Hispanic/Latino as an ethnic category. This table excludes Latinos from the racial categories and assigns them to a separate category. Hispanics/Latinos may be of any race.
Race / Ethnicity (NH = Non-Hispanic)	Pop 2000	Pop 2010	Pop 2020	% 2000	% 2010	% 2020
White alone (NH)	353	403	320	83.65%	79.96%	66.39%
Black or African American alone (NH)	1	1	3	0.24%	0.20%	0.62%
Native American or Alaska Native alone (NH)	5	0	0	1.18%	0.00%	0.00%
Asian alone (NH)	0	2	0	0.00%	0.40%	0.00%
Mixed race or Multiracial (NH)	2	1	23	0.47%	0.20%	4.77%
Hispanic or Latino (any race)	61	97	136	14.45%	19.25%	28.22%
Total	422	504	482	100.00%	100.00%	100.00%

As of the 2020 United States census, 482 people, 93 households, and 55 families were residing in the CDP.

=== 2000 census ===
As of the census of 2000, 422 people, 167 households, and 124 families resided in the CDP. The population density was 348.4 people per mi^{2} (134.7/km^{2}). The 218 housing units averaged 180.0 per mi^{2} (69.6/km^{2}). The racial makeup of the CDP was 92.18% White, 0.47% African American, 1.18% Native American, 5.21% from other races, and 0.95% from two or more races. Hispanic or Latino residents of any race were 14.45% of the population.

Of the 167 households, 38.3% had children under 18 living with them, 51.5% were married couples living together, 19.8% had a female householder with no husband present, and 25.7% were not families; 22.2% of all households were made up of individuals, and 7.8% had someone living alone who was 65 or older. The average household size was 2.53, and the average family size was 2.96.

In the CDP, the population distributed as 30.6% under 18, 5.5% from 18 to 24, 25.1% from 25 to 44, 24.4% from 45 to 64, and 14.5% who were 65 or older. The median age was 40 years. For every 100 females, there were 99.1 males. For every 100 females 18 and over, there were 86.6 males.

The median income in the CDP for a household was $26,750 and for a family was $32,292. Males had a median income of $28,750 versus $24,688 for females. The per capita income for the CDP was $13,257. About 12.6% of families and 18.3% of the population were below the poverty line, including 25.4% of those under 18 and 10.2% of those 65 or over.

== Education ==
Public education in the community of Christoval is provided by the Christoval Independent School District.
