= O. C. Fisher Reservoir =

Reservoir in Texas, U.S.

O.C. Fisher Reservoir
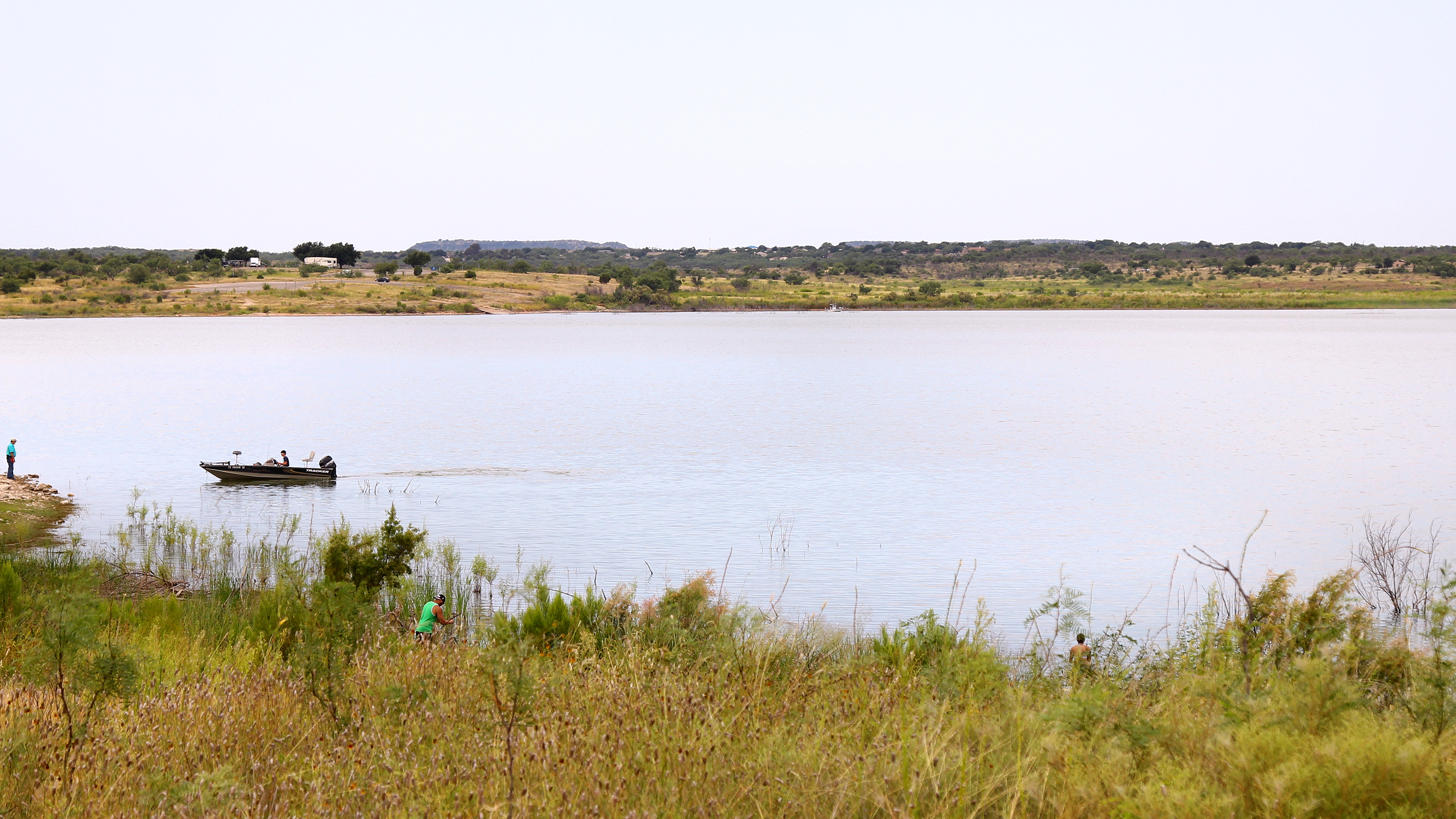
- The reservoir as seen from San Angelo State Park.

- Location within Texas
- Location: Tom Green County, west of San Angelo, Texas
- Coordinates: 31°29′0″N 100°29′0″W
- Primary inflows: North Concho River
- Primary outflows: North Concho River
- Basin countries: United States
- Max. length: 8.5 mi (13.7 km)
- Max. width: 2.5 mi (4.0 km)
- Surface area: 5,440 acres (2,200 ha)
- Max. depth: 58 ft (18 m)
- Water volume: 396,400 acre⋅ft (0.4890 km^{3})
- Surface elevation: 1,908 ft (582 m)

O. C. Fisher Reservoir (also known as O. C. Fisher Lake, formerly known as San Angelo Lake) is an artificial lake located west of the city of San Angelo, Texas. With the financial support of the Upper Colorado River Authority, construction on the dam on the North Concho River to form the reservoir was begun by the United States Army Corps of Engineers in 1947 and the lake was officially impounded in 1952. Originally named San Angelo Lake, the reservoir was renamed in 1975 for local U.S. Congressman O. C. Fisher, to honor his 23 years of service in the United States Congress.

O.C. Fisher Reservoir was established to provide flood control and a secondary drinking water source for San Angelo and the surrounding communities in Tom Green County. The lake also serves as a recreational venue for fishing, boating, and swimming. The dam and reservoir are managed by the United States Army Corps of Engineers, which leases 7,677 acres (3,107 ha) of the surrounding shoreline to Texas Parks and Wildlife, for San Angelo State Park.

Due to the 2011 drought affecting Texas, the water had taken on a reddish hue, caused by bacteria of the Chromatiaceae, which were thriving in the oxygen-deprived water. In March 2012, the reservoir was completely dry and was officially at 0% capacity. The lake remained between 0% and 1% capacity until May 2015, when near-daily heavy rains caused the lake level to rise over 22 feet to just above 13% capacity in a month.

== Fish populations ==
O. C. Fisher Reservoir had been stocked with species of fish intended to improve the utility of the reservoir for recreational fishing. Fish present in the lake include largemouth bass, white bass, catfish, and white crappie. Due to the severe drought of 2011, the reservoir completely dried up and caused the death of all remaining fish. The lake was restocked with largemouth bass in 2016.
