= Concho River =

Concho River Río Concho
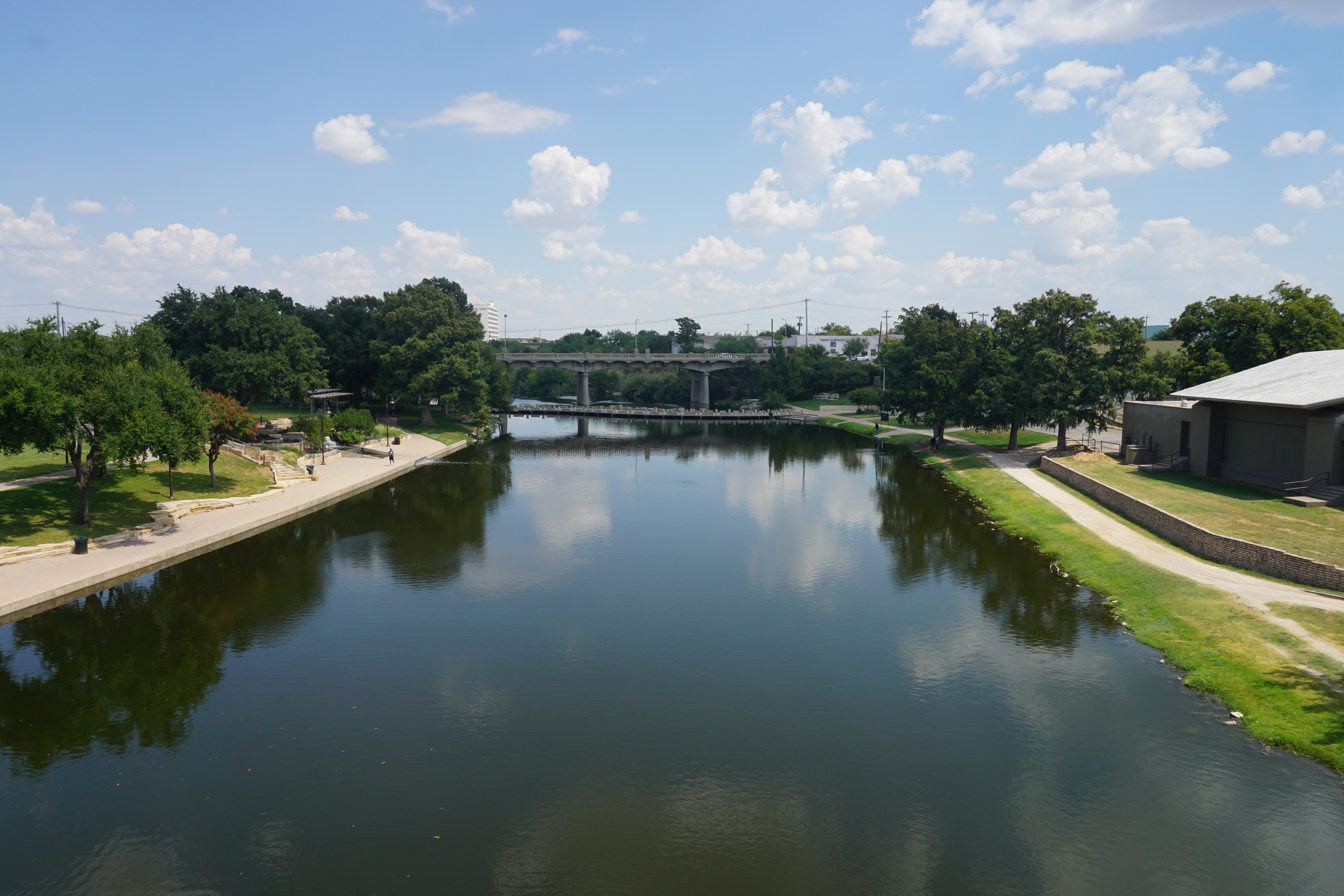
- The Concho River in San Angelo, Texas

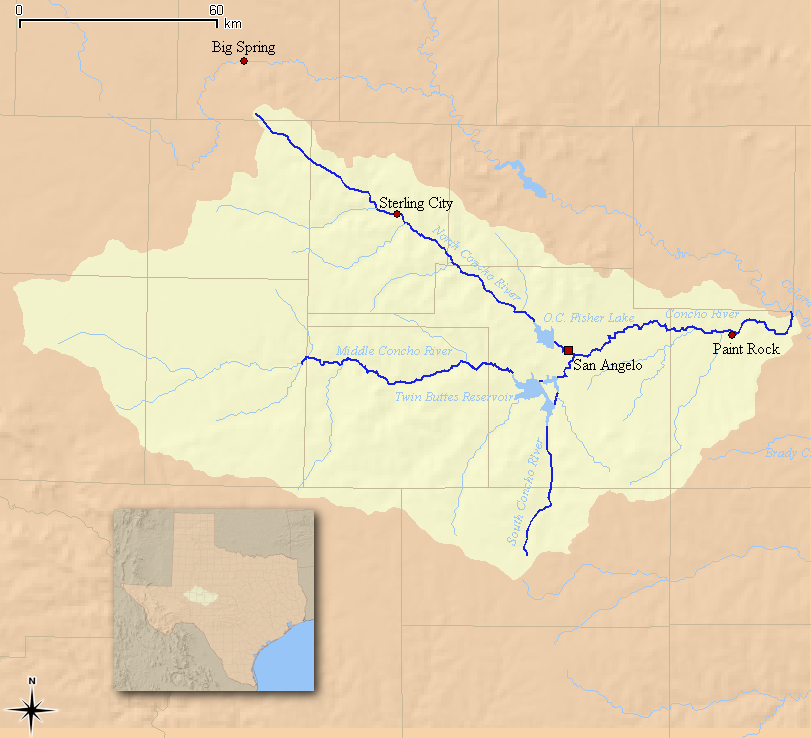
- Map of the Concho River and associated watershed

Location
- Country: United States
- State: Texas
- Counties: Concho and Tom Green

Physical characteristics
- Mouth
  - coordinates: 31°34′17″N 99°43′29″W
  - elevation: 1,480 ft (450 m)

The Concho River is a river in the U.S. state of Texas. Concho is Spanish for "shell"; the river was so named due to its abundance of freshwater mussels, such as the Tampico pearly mussel (Cyrtonaias tampicoensis).

== Geography ==
The Concho River has three primary feeds: the North, Middle, and South Concho Rivers. The North Concho River is the longest fork, starting in Howard County and traveling southeast for 88 mi (142 km) until merging with the South and Middle forks near Goodfellow Air Force Base in San Angelo, Texas. The combined branches of the river flow east about 58 mi (93 km) until it eventually empties into the Colorado River within the waters of the O.H. Ivie Lake about 12 mi (19 km) east of Paint Rock, Texas.

== History ==
Hernando de Ugarte y la Concha, Governor of New Mexico, dispatched an expedition from Santa Fe in 1650 led by Captain Diego del Castillo, to explore what is now north central Texas. The expedition reached the territory of the Tejas Indians, and reported finding pearls on the Concho River. The Diego de Guadalajara expedition was launched in 1654 to follow up on Castillo's findings. The Spanish explored the river for the gem-quality purple to pink pearls produced by that species. The mussels were systematically harvested for only a short time because they soon realized that the yield of pearls was too low for their harvest to be economically viable.

== See also ==
- List of rivers of Texas
- Concho County, Texas
- Concho Valley
