= Charles L. South =

American politician (1892–1965)

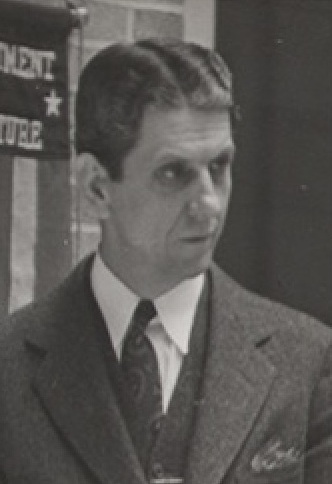

Member of the Texas House of Representatives
- In office 1947–1948

Member of the U.S. House of Representatives from Texas's 21st district
- In office January 3, 1935 – January 3, 1943
- Preceded by: District created
- Succeeded by: O. C. Fisher

Personal details
- Born: Charles Lacy South; July 22, 1892 near Damascus, Virginia, U.S.
- Died: December 20, 1965 (aged 73) Austin, Texas, U.S.
- Resting place: Coleman Cemetery, Coleman, Texas, U.S.
- Party: Democratic
- Education: Simmons College
- Profession: Politician, lawyer, judge, educator

Charles Lacy South (July 22, 1892 – December 20, 1965) was an American educator, lawyer and politician who served four terms as a U.S. representative from Texas from 1935 to 1943.

== Biography ==
Born on a farm near Damascus, Virginia. South moved with his parents to Callahan County, Texas, in 1898 and to Coleman County, Texas, in 1914. He attended the public schools and Simmons College at Abilene, Texas, in 1915 and 1916.

=== Early career ===
He taught in the Coleman County, Texas, public schools from 1914 to 1920.

He served as superintendent of schools of Coleman County from 1921 to 1925. He studied law and was admitted to the bar in 1925. He served as county judge from 1925 to 1931 and as district attorney for the thirty-fifth judicial district from 1930 to 1934.

=== Congress ===
South was elected as a Democrat to the Seventy-fourth and to the three succeeding Congresses, serving from January 3, 1935 to January 3, 1943. He was an unsuccessful candidate for renomination in the first primary in 1942 and later withdrew.

=== Later career ===
He engaged in the practice of law in Coleman, Texas. He served as member of the State house of representatives in 1947 and 1948. He was a resident of Austin, Texas, from 1948 until his death.

== Death and burial ==
He died in Austin on December 20, 1965, and was interred in Coleman Cemetery, Coleman, Texas.

== Sources ==
- United States Congress. "Charles L. South (id: S000683)". Biographical Directory of the United States Congress.

U.S. House of Representatives
Preceded by District created	Member of the U.S. House of Representatives from Texas's 21st congressional district 1935–1943	Succeeded by O. C. Fisher
