= KPTJ =

Coordinates: 31°26′19″N 100°34′19″W

- Grape Creek, Texas; United States
- Broadcast area: San Angelo, Texas
- Frequency: 104.5 MHz
- Branding: Magia 104.5

Programming
- Language: Spanish
- Format: Latin mix

Ownership
- Owner: La Unica Broadcasting Co.
- Sister stations: KSJT-FM

History
- First air date: September 2012

Technical information
- Licensing authority: FCC
- Facility ID: 164190
- Class: C3
- ERP: 25,000 watts
- HAAT: 100 meters (330 ft)

Links
- Public license information: Public file; LMS
- Webcast: Listen live
- Website: KPTJ Online

KPTJ (104.5 FM) is a radio station licensed to Grape Creek, Texas. The station began in September 2012, and broadcasts a Latin mix format and is owned by La Unica Broadcasting Co.
