= North Concho River =

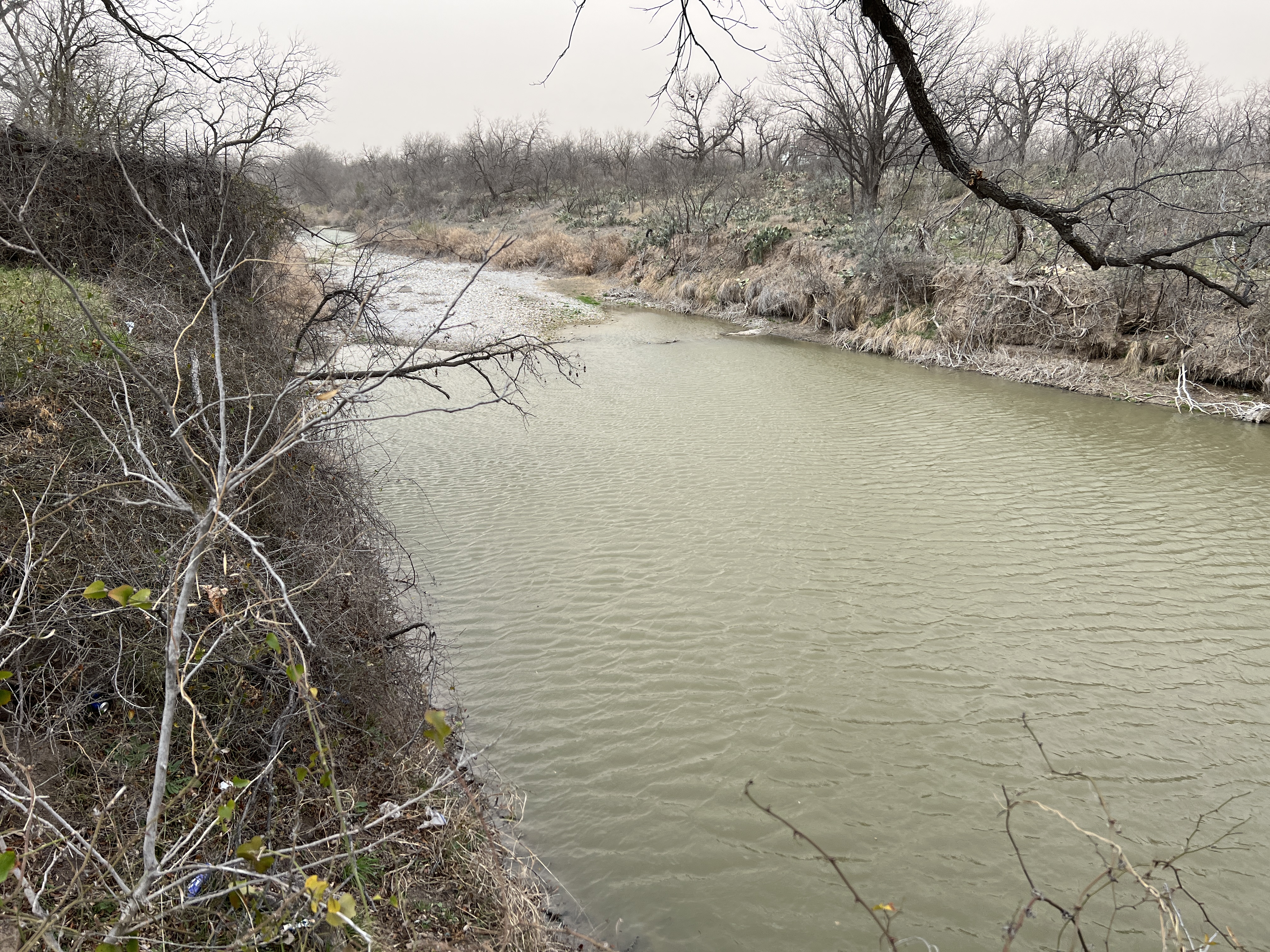

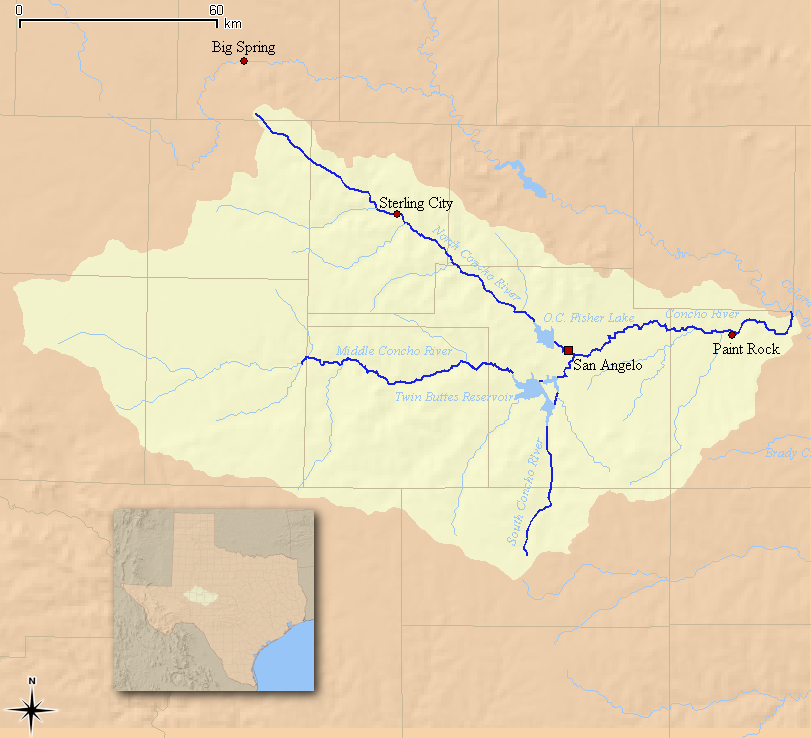
- Map of the Concho River and its tributaries

Location
- Country: United States
- State: Texas

Physical characteristics
- Source
  - location: Howard County, Texas
  - coordinates: 32°06′58″N 101°27′12″W
- Mouth: Concho River
  - location: near Goodfellow Air Force Base, Tom Green County, Texas
  - coordinates: 31°27′16″N 100°24′59″W
  - elevation: 1,798 ft (548 m)
- Length: 88 mi (142 km)

The North Concho River is a river in west-central Texas and one of three tributaries of the Concho River. The stream flows southeastward for 98 miles (158 km) to join with South Concho and Middle Concho rivers to form the Concho River. The Concho River flows into the upper Colorado River of Texas, which empties into the Gulf of Mexico (not to be confused with the Colorado that flows through Arizona and Nevada).

== Course ==
The headwaters of the North Concho River lie in southern Howard County and trends southeastward through Glasscock County, Sterling City of Sterling County, then Water Valley, Carlsbad, and Grape Creek of Tom Green County, and into O.C. Fisher Reservoir (formerly San Angelo Lake) Water released from the lake flows under 29th St. and meanders through northwest and downtown San Angelo, until it merges with the South Concho to form the main stem of the Concho River at Bell Street. Since 1980, $2 million have been spent to improve the city portion of the river, and plans are made to spend $8 million more.

== See also ==
- List of rivers of Texas
