= Tom Green County, Texas =

County in Texas, United States

- County
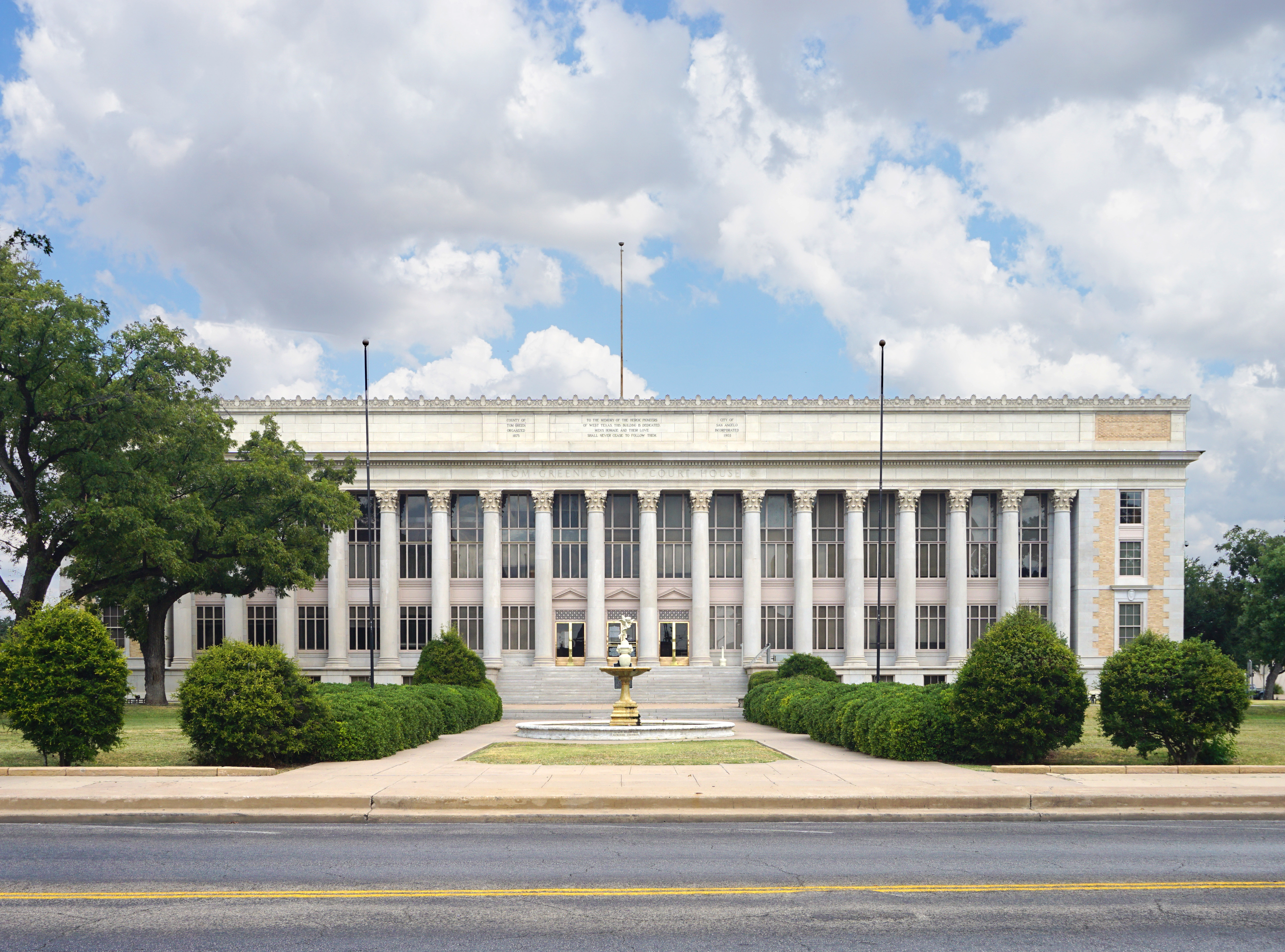
- Tom Green County Courthouse in San Angelo

- Seal

- Location within the U.S. state of Texas
- Coordinates: 31°25′N 100°28′W
- Country: United States
- State: Texas
- Founded: 1875
- Named for: General Thomas Green
- Seat: San Angelo
- Largest city: San Angelo

Area
  - Total: 1,541 sq mi (3,990 km^{2})
  - Land: 1,522 sq mi (3,940 km^{2})
  - Water: 19 sq mi (49 km^{2}) 1.2%

Population (2020)
  - Total: 120,003
  - Estimate (2025): 120,602 ▲
  - Density: 78/sq mi (30/km^{2})
- Time zone: UTC−6 (Central)
  - Summer (DST): UTC−5 (CDT)
- Congressional district: 11th
- Website: www.tomgreencountytx.gov

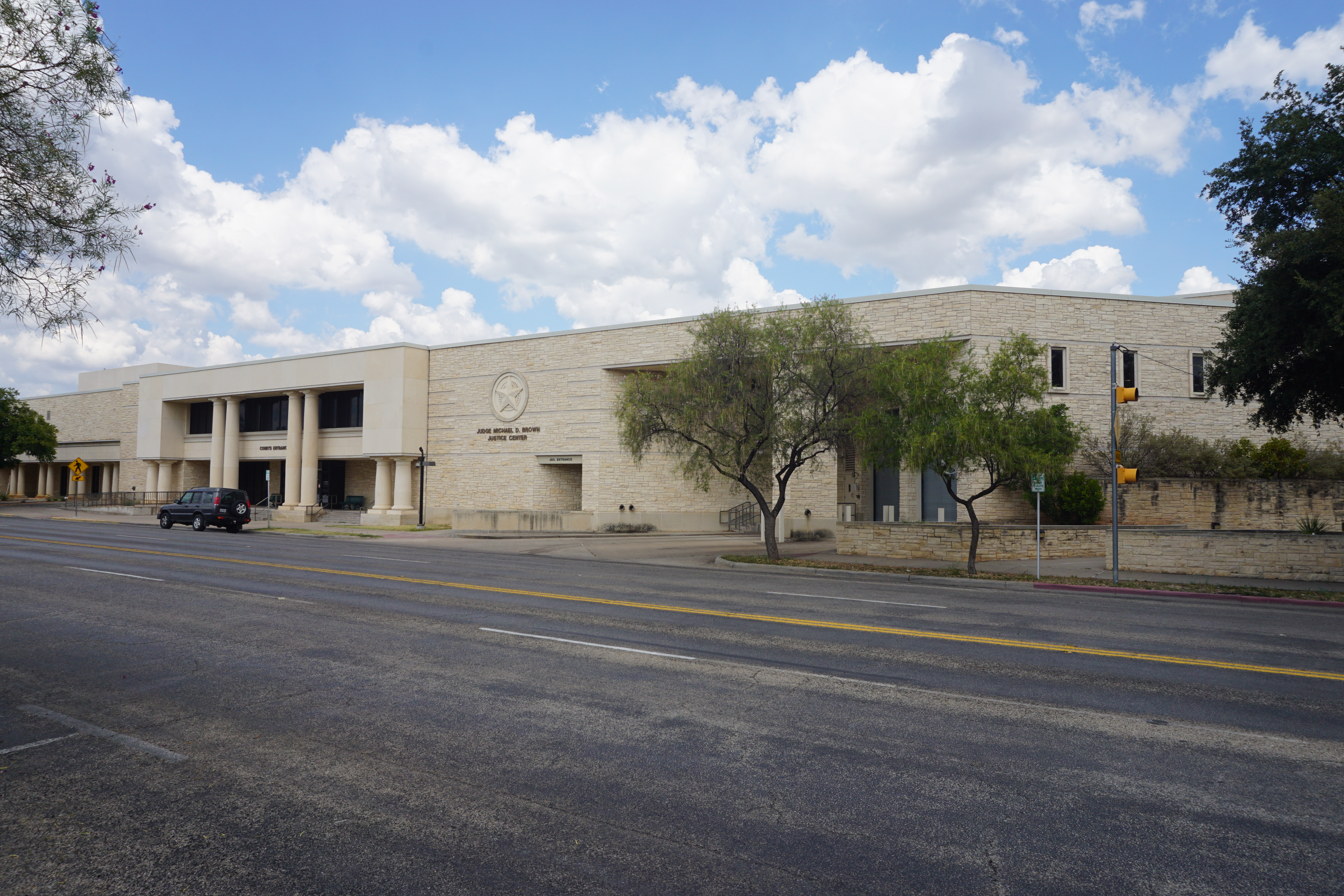
Judge Michael D. Brown Justice Center across from the Tom Green County Courthouse

Tom Green County is a county located on the Edwards Plateau in the U.S. state of Texas. As of the 2020 census, its population was 120,003. Its county seat is San Angelo. The county was created in 1874 and organized the following year. It is named for Thomas Green, who was a Texas revolutionary, Confederate soldier, and lawyer. Tom Green County is included in the San Angelo metropolitan area; the county is home to Goodfellow Air Force Base, as well as Angelo State University, part of the Texas Tech University System.

== History ==
The county was established by the state legislature on March 13, 1874, and named after Thomas Green, a Texas revolutionary and a Confederate brigadier general. It originally comprised an area over 60,000 sq mi (160,000 km^{2}).

The original county seat was the town of Ben Ficklin. In 1882, flood waters of the Concho River destroyed the town and drowned 65 people. The county seat was moved to Santa Angela. In 1883, the town's name was officially changed to San Angelo by the United States Post Office. Following completion of the Santa Fe Railway in September 1888, the county increased its cattle production to an estimated export of 3,500 to 5,000 railroad cars. In 1889, San Angelo became incorporated to a city, and Fort Concho shut down after 22 years of operation.

Tom Green County has a long, narrow strip of land extending to the west. This unusual feature is because Reagan County to the west used to be part of Tom Green County, and the state of Texas required that all counties have a contiguous land route to their county seat. The small strip of land served to connect the two main regions. In 1903, the residents of the western section voted to form Reagan County, while the same vote decided that the connecting strip would remain part of Tom Green County.

In 2021, during Winter Storm Uri, the city of San Angelo endured 152 hours at or below freezing temperatures. Hurricanes and tropical storms that have hit Tom Green include:

- Matagorda hurricane (1942)
- Tropical Storm Delia (1973)
- Hurricane Gilbert (1988)
- Tropical Storm Erin (2007)
- Tropical Storm Hermine (2010)

== Geography ==
According to the U.S. Census Bureau, the county has a total area of 1,541 sq mi (3,990 km^{2}), of which 1,522 sq mi (3,940 km^{2}) are land and 19 sq mi (49 km^{2}) (1.2%) are covered by water. The county's protected areas are Lake Nasworthy, O.C. Fisher Reservoir, Twin Buttes Reservoir, San Angelo State Park, and Heart of Texas Wildlife Trail. Tom Green County also has the Concho River, (North Concho River, South Concho River) and a small creek named Kickapoo Creek.

=== Adjacent counties ===
- Coke County (north)
- Runnels County (northeast)
- Concho County (east)
- Menard County (southeast)
- Schleicher County (south)
- Irion County (west)
- Reagan County (west)
- Sterling County (northwest)

== Demographics ==
Historical population
Census	Pop.	Note	%±
1880	3,615		—
1890	5,152		42.5%
1900	6,804		32.1%
1910	17,882		162.8%
1920	15,210		−14.9%
1930	36,033		136.9%
1940	39,302		9.1%
1950	58,929		49.9%
1960	64,630		9.7%
1970	71,047		9.9%
1980	84,784		19.3%
1990	98,458		16.1%
2000	104,010		5.6%
2010	110,224		6.0%
2020	120,003		8.9%
2025 (est.)	120,602	▲	0.5%
U.S. Decennial Census; 1850–2010 2010 2020

=== Racial and ethnic composition ===
Tom Green County, Texas – Racial and ethnic composition Note: the US Census treats Hispanic/Latino as an ethnic category. This table excludes Latinos from the racial categories and assigns them to a separate category. Hispanics/Latinos may be of any race.
Race / Ethnicity (NH = Non-Hispanic)	Pop 1980	Pop 1990	Pop 2000	Pop 2010	Pop 2020	% 1980	% 1990	% 2000	% 2010	% 2020
White alone (NH)	62,696	67,642	65,508	63,799	62,390	73.95%	68.70%	62.98%	57.88%	51.99%
Black or African American alone (NH)	3,329	3,955	4,122	3,997	4,010	3.93%	4.02%	3.96%	3.63%	3.34%
Native American or Alaska Native alone (NH)	226	280	380	406	366	0.27%	0.28%	0.37%	0.37%	0.30%
Asian alone (NH)	442	951	855	1,046	1,704	0.52%	0.97%	0.82%	0.95%	1.42%
Native Hawaiian or Pacific Islander alone (NH)	x	x	53	78	143	x	x	0.05%	0.07%	0.12%
Other race alone (NH)	138	129	88	129	369	0.16%	0.13%	0.08%	0.12%	0.31%
Mixed race or Multiracial (NH)	x	x	1,058	1,454	3,955	x	x	1.02%	1.32%	3.30%
Hispanic or Latino (any race)	17,953	25,501	31,946	39,315	47,066	21.17%	25.90%	30.71%	35.67%	39.22%
Total	84,784	98,458	104,010	110,224	120,003	100.00%	100.00%	100.00%	100.00%	100.00%

=== 2020 census ===
As of the 2020 census, the county had a population of 120,003. The median age was 36.0 years. 23.5% of residents were under the age of 18 and 16.8% of residents were 65 years of age or older. For every 100 females there were 97.2 males, and for every 100 females age 18 and over there were 95.6 males age 18 and over.

The racial makeup of the county was 65.5% White, 3.8% Black or African American, 0.9% American Indian and Alaska Native, 1.5% Asian, 0.1% Native Hawaiian and Pacific Islander, 10.5% from some other race, and 17.8% from two or more races. Hispanic or Latino residents of any race comprised 39.2% of the population.

83.3% of residents lived in urban areas, while 16.7% lived in rural areas.

There were 46,683 households in the county, of which 31.2% had children under the age of 18 living in them. Of all households, 45.1% were married-couple households, 20.4% were households with a male householder and no spouse or partner present, and 27.7% were households with a female householder and no spouse or partner present. About 28.8% of all households were made up of individuals and 11.8% had someone living alone who was 65 years of age or older.

There were 51,406 housing units, of which 9.2% were vacant. Among occupied housing units, 62.4% were owner-occupied and 37.6% were renter-occupied. The homeowner vacancy rate was 1.7% and the rental vacancy rate was 8.4%.

=== 2000 census ===
As of the 2000 census, 104,010 people, 39,503 households, and 26,783 families resided in the county. The population density was 68 people/mi^{2} (26 people/km^{2}). The 43,916 housing units averaged 29 units per square mile (11 units/km^{2}). The racial makeup of the county was 50.76% White, 5.13% African American, 0.65% Native American, 0.86% Asian, 0.07% Pacific Islander, 12.82% from other races, and 2.39% from two or more races. About 30.71% of the population were Hispanic or Latino of any race, 13.2% were of German, 10.7% American, 8.2% English, and 7.2% Irish ancestry according to Census 2000.

Of the 39,503 households, 33.00% had children under the age of 18 living with them, 52.10% were married couples living together, 11.90% had a female householder with no husband present, and 32.20% were not families. About 27.2% of all households were made up of individuals, and 10.80% had someone living alone who was 65 or older. The average household size was 2.52, and the average family size was 3.09.

In the county, the age distribution was 26.10% under 18, 12.80% from 18 to 24, 27.10% from 25 to 44, 20.60% from 45 to 64, and 13.40% who were 65 or older. The median age was 34 years. For every 100 females, there were 93.70 males. For every 100 females age 18 and over, there were 89.90 males.

The median income for a household in the county was $33,148, and for a family was $39,482. Males had a median income of $27,949 versus $20,683 for females. The per capita income for the county was $17,325. About 11.20% of families and 15.20% of the population were below the poverty line, including 20.20% of those under age 18 and 11.80% of those age 65 or over.

== Education ==
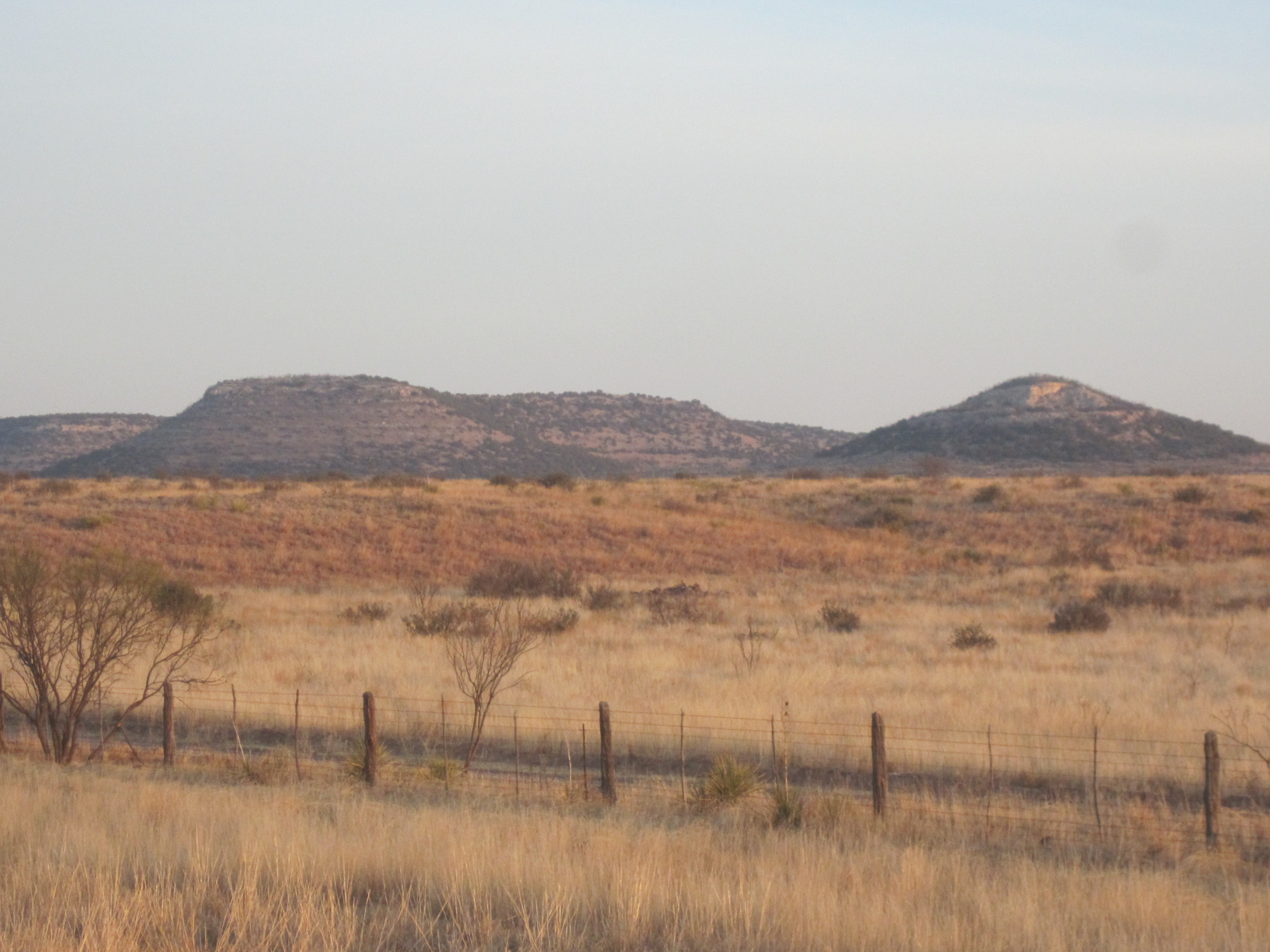
View from U.S. Highway 87 northwest of San Angelo in Tom Green County

=== Colleges ===
- Angelo State University
- Howard College

All of Tom Green County is in the service area of Howard County Junior College District.

=== Public school districts ===
School districts include:

- Christoval Independent School District
- Grape Creek Independent School District
- Miles Independent School District
- San Angelo Independent School District
- Veribest Independent School District
- Wall Independent School District
- Water Valley Independent School District

== Transportation ==
=== Major highways ===
- US 67
- US 87
- US 277
- SH 163
- SH 208
- Spur 126
- Loop 110
- Loop 306
- Loop 378
- Loop 570

== Communities ==
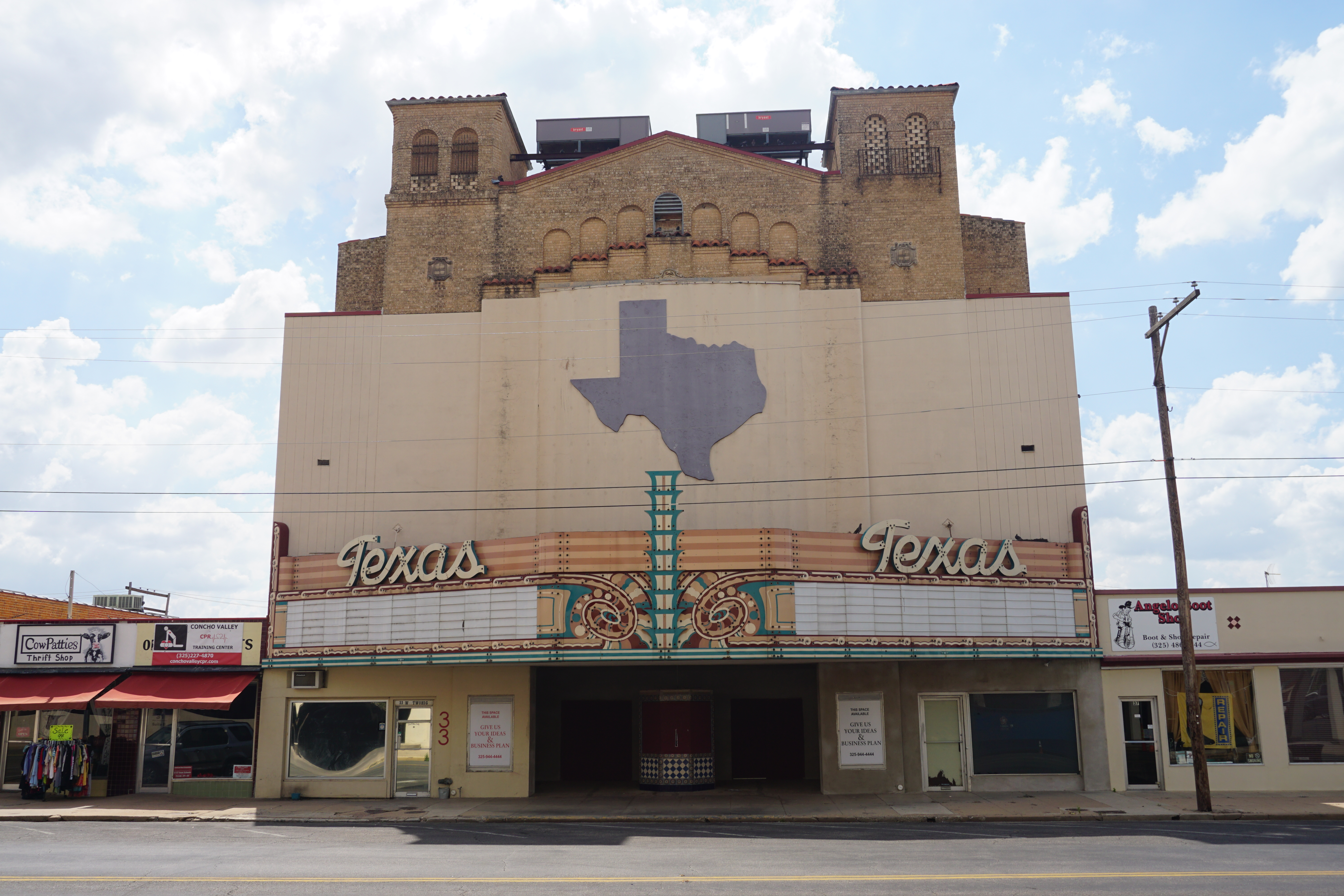
Former Texas Theater in downtown San Angelo

=== City ===
- San Angelo (county seat)

=== Census-designated places ===
- Carlsbad
- Christoval
- Grape Creek

=== Unincorporated communities ===
- Harriett
- Knickerbocker
- Mereta
- Tankersley
- Vancourt
- Veribest
- Wall
- Water Valley

=== Ghost town ===
- Ben Ficklin

=== Military base ===
- Goodfellow Air Force Base

== Politics ==
United States presidential election results for Tom Green County, Texas
Year	Republican		Democratic		Third party(ies)	
Year	No.	%	No.	%	No.	%
1912	50	4.48%	906	81.18%	160	14.34%
1916	92	6.52%	1,243	88.16%	75	5.32%
1920	256	15.52%	1,264	76.61%	130	7.88%
1924	554	19.83%	2,116	75.73%	124	4.44%
1928	2,618	63.11%	1,528	36.84%	2	0.05%
1932	739	12.93%	4,957	86.75%	18	0.32%
1936	627	11.40%	4,803	87.34%	69	1.25%
1940	1,049	13.99%	6,433	85.81%	15	0.20%
1944	1,125	13.54%	6,272	75.51%	909	10.94%
1948	1,822	19.99%	6,777	74.34%	517	5.67%
1952	9,698	62.49%	5,797	37.35%	24	0.15%
1956	9,070	64.63%	4,923	35.08%	40	0.29%
1960	8,176	53.63%	7,031	46.12%	39	0.26%
1964	6,664	40.53%	9,767	59.40%	12	0.07%
1968	9,682	49.56%	6,774	34.67%	3,080	15.77%
1972	15,784	71.87%	6,082	27.69%	95	0.43%
1976	12,316	52.29%	11,064	46.97%	174	0.74%
1980	16,555	60.71%	9,892	36.27%	824	3.02%
1984	23,847	72.46%	8,981	27.29%	82	0.25%
1988	21,463	63.10%	12,283	36.11%	266	0.78%
1992	14,989	40.80%	11,437	31.13%	10,313	28.07%
1996	18,112	55.21%	11,782	35.91%	2,914	8.88%
2000	24,733	71.43%	9,288	26.82%	605	1.75%
2004	28,185	75.33%	9,007	24.07%	225	0.60%
2008	27,362	70.41%	11,158	28.71%	341	0.88%
2012	26,878	73.20%	9,294	25.31%	548	1.49%
2016	27,494	71.45%	9,173	23.84%	1,812	4.71%
2020	32,313	71.47%	12,239	27.07%	658	1.46%
2024	33,399	73.47%	11,585	25.48%	476	1.05%

United States Senate election results for Tom Green County, Texas1
Year	Republican		Democratic		Third party(ies)	
Year	No.	%	No.	%	No.	%
2024	31,686	70.15%	12,332	27.30%	1,152	2.55%

United States Senate election results for Tom Green County, Texas2
Year	Republican		Democratic		Third party(ies)	
Year	No.	%	No.	%	No.	%
2020	32,340	72.15%	11,371	25.37%	1,112	2.48%

Texas Gubernatorial election results for Tom Green County
Year	Republican		Democratic		Third party(ies)	
Year	No.	%	No.	%	No.	%
2022	23,873	74.96%	7,516	23.60%	458	1.44%

== Notable person ==
- August Pfluger is an American politician and retired military officer, and is serving as the U.S. representative for Texas's 11th congressional district.

== See also ==
- List of museums in West Texas
- National Register of Historic Places listings in Tom Green County, Texas
- USS Tom Green County (LST-1159)
- Recorded Texas Historic Landmarks in Tom Green County
