= Christoval Independent School District =

School district in Texas

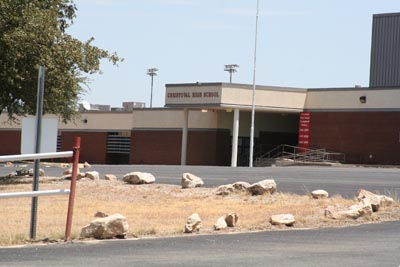
CISD High School

Christoval Independent School District is a public school district based in the community of Christoval, Texas, United States. Christoval ISD has two schools - Christoval High (grades 6–12) and Christoval Elementary (prekindergarten-grade 5). The elementary school is located on Main Street, and the high school is on Toenail Trail just outside town. Christoval's school colors are red, white, and black.

In 2009, the school district was rated "recognized" by the Texas Education Agency.

B. F. Kirk was first named superintendent in 1945. In 1949, the district had 125 students.
