= Vancourt, Texas =

Vancourt
- Unincorporated community
- Location within the state of Texas Vancourt (the United States)
- Coordinates: 31°20′35″N 100°10′37″W
- Country: United States
- State: Texas
- County: Tom Green
- Elevation: 1,867 ft (569 m)
- Time zone: UTC-6 (Central (CST))
  - Summer (DST): UTC-5 (CDT)
- ZIP codes: 76955
- GNIS feature ID: 1380708

Vancourt is an unincorporated community in eastern Tom Green County, Texas, United States. It lies along U.S. Route 87 east of the city of San Angelo, the county seat of Tom Green County. Its elevation is 1,867 feet (569 m). Although Vancourt is unincorporated, it has a post office, with the ZIP code of 76955; the ZCTA for ZIP Code 76955 had a population of 108 at the 2000 census.

Vancourt was named for the wife of the community's first postmaster, whose maiden name was Van Court. It lies in an area whose economy depends primarily on ranching.

== Climate ==
The climate in this area is characterized by hot, humid summers and generally mild to cool winters. According to the Köppen climate classification system, Vancourt has a humid subtropical climate, Cfa on climate maps.
