= San Angelo State Park =

State park in Texas, United States

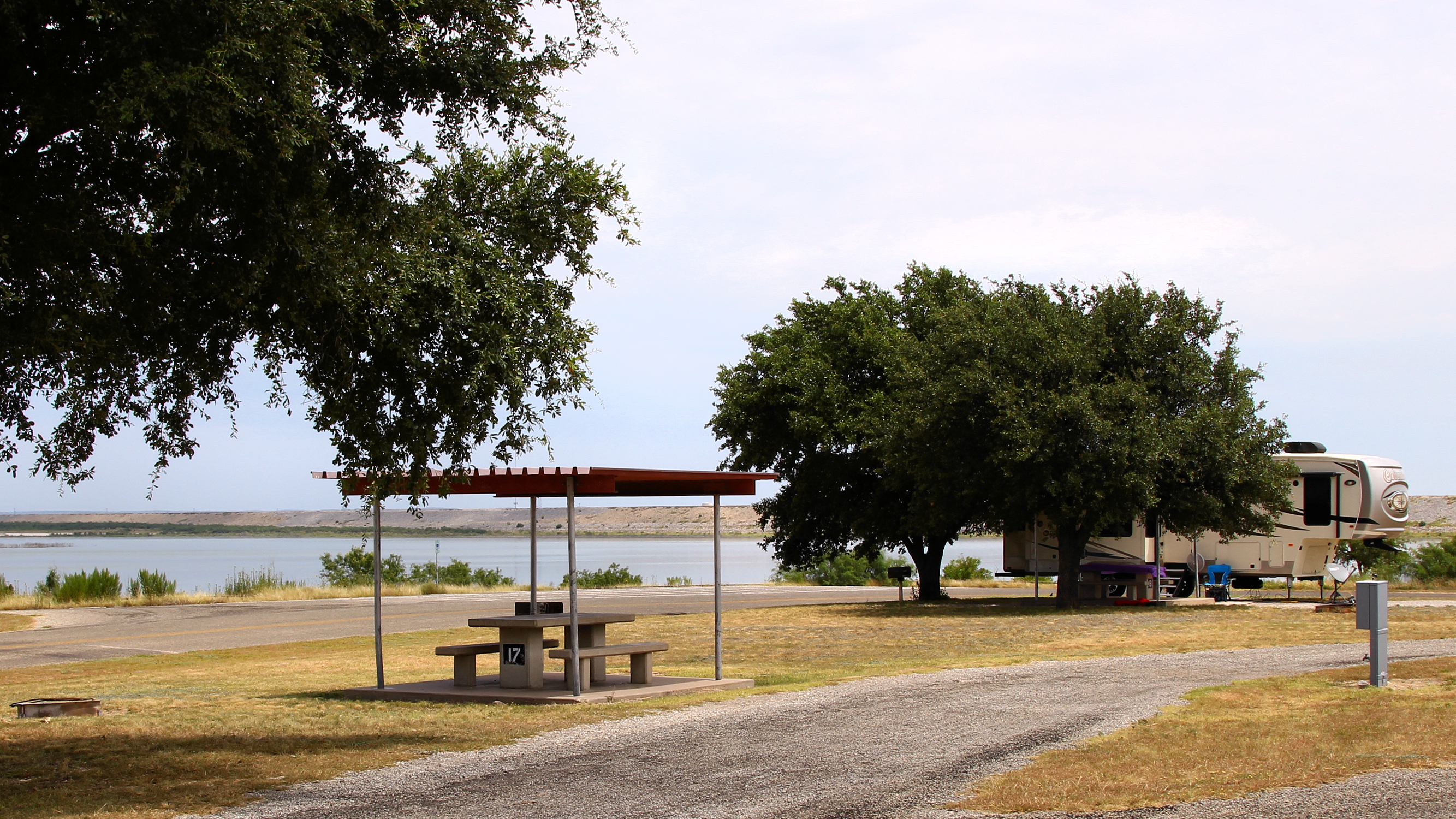
- A campground area in the park.

- Location within Texas Location within the United States
- Location: Tom Green County, Texas
- Nearest city: San Angelo
- Coordinates: 31°27′38″N 100°30′28″W
- Area: 7,677 acres (3,107 ha)
- Established: 1995
- Visitors: 59,415 (in 2025)
- Governing body: Texas Parks and Wildlife Department
- Website: Official site

San Angelo State Park is a 7,677 acres (3,107 ha) state park in Tom Green County, Texas, United States on the shores of the O.C. Fisher Reservoir near the eastern edge of San Angelo. The park is composed of two units, the north unit and south unit. The park opened in 1995 and is managed by the Texas Parks and Wildlife Department.

== History ==
Native Americans, according to archeological findings, had lived in the area for 18,000 years starting with Paleo-Indian hunters of giant ice age mammals. European Americans arrived in the early 16th century, establishing missions for the resident Jumano Indians.

The United States Army Corps of Engineers completed O.C. Fisher Reservoir in 1952 with assistance from the Upper Colorado River Authority for the purpose of flood control and to provide secondary source of drinking water for San Angelo and the surrounding communities. The land surrounding it, which now makes up the area of the park, was leased to the Texas Parks and Wildlife Department and opened as San Angelo State Park in 1995.

== Nature ==
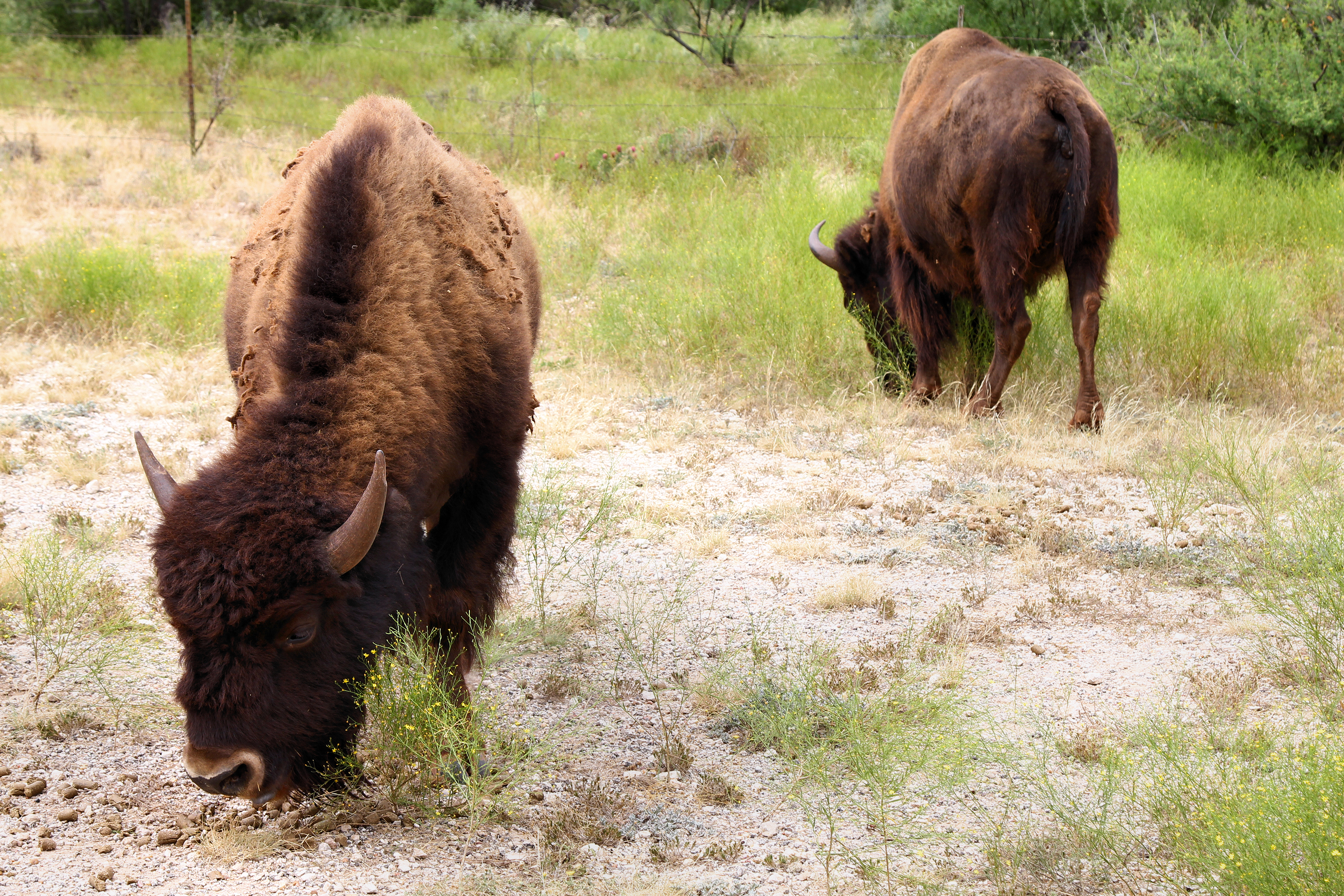
Bison grazing in San Angelo State Park

=== Animals ===
American bison that are part of the Texas State Bison Herd and Texas Longhorn that are part of the State of Texas Longhorn Herd are kept at the park. There are opportunities to see white-tailed deer, black-tailed jackrabbit, eastern cottontail, desert cottontail, North American porcupine and many species of snakes. Birds seen include pyrrhuloxia, cedar waxwing, painted bunting, blue grosbeak, spotted towhee, northern bobwhite, greater roadrunner, killdeer, red-tailed hawk golden-fronted woodpecker, ladder-backed Woodpecker and yellow-billed cuckoo.

=== Plants ===
Prickly pear cactus and Christmas cholla, honey mesquite and redberry juniper fills the park. Around the waterline are pecan, black willow, sugar hackberry, Texas live oak. The underbrush is primarily agarita, catclaw acacia, whitebrush, lotebush, little leaf sumac and some western soapberry. Plains yucca and Texas sacahuiste occur in the dryer areas. King Ranch bluestem and bristlegrass are probably the most common of the grasses.

== Activities ==
Camping facilities at the park include six enclosed, air-conditioned, and heated cabins and numerous campsites with water and electricity, picnic tables, and grills, and nearby restroom facilities. The park also has over 45 miles of developed trails suitable for hiking, mountain biking, and horseback riding. Boat ramps and a fishing pier support boating, fishing, and paddling pursuits. Swimming in the lake is permitted. With a State Park Annual Hunting Permit, deer and turkey hunting is available at scheduled times.

== See also ==
- List of Texas state parks
