= Jane Ford Aebersold =

American artist (born 1941)

- Born: 1941 (age 84–85); San Angelo, Texas, U.S.
- Education: Tulane University (BA); Alfred University (MFA)
- Occupation: Artist

Jane Ford Aebersold (born 1941) is an American artist specializing in ceramics.

== Early life and education ==
Ford was born in San Angelo, Texas. She received her Bachelor of Fine Arts from Newcomb Art School, Tulane University in 1969. In 1971, she earned an MFA from SUNY College of Ceramics at Alfred University.

== Career ==
Ford Aebersold taught at Alfred University Summer School, 1971; University of Bridgeport, 1972; Bennington College, 1972 to 1995. Her showings include Group Shows: Ceramics Invitational for the Annual Meeting of the American Ceramic Society, Chicago, Illinois, 1974; Park McCullough House, North Bennington, Vermont, 1974; Approaches: Contemporary Ceramic Education, Philadelphia, Pennsylvania. 1975; University of West Virginia, Morgantown, West Virginia, 1975; 32nd Annual Scripps Invitational, Claremont, California, 1976; Seibu Exhibition, Tokyo, Japan, 1976.

In 1986, Ford Aebersold was invited to "American Ceramics Today," a symposium held in May of the same year at the Victoria and Albert Museum in London.

Ford Aebersold's works are held in the Smithsonian, the Carnegie Museum, and Museum of Fine Arts, Houston.
