= KSJT-FM =

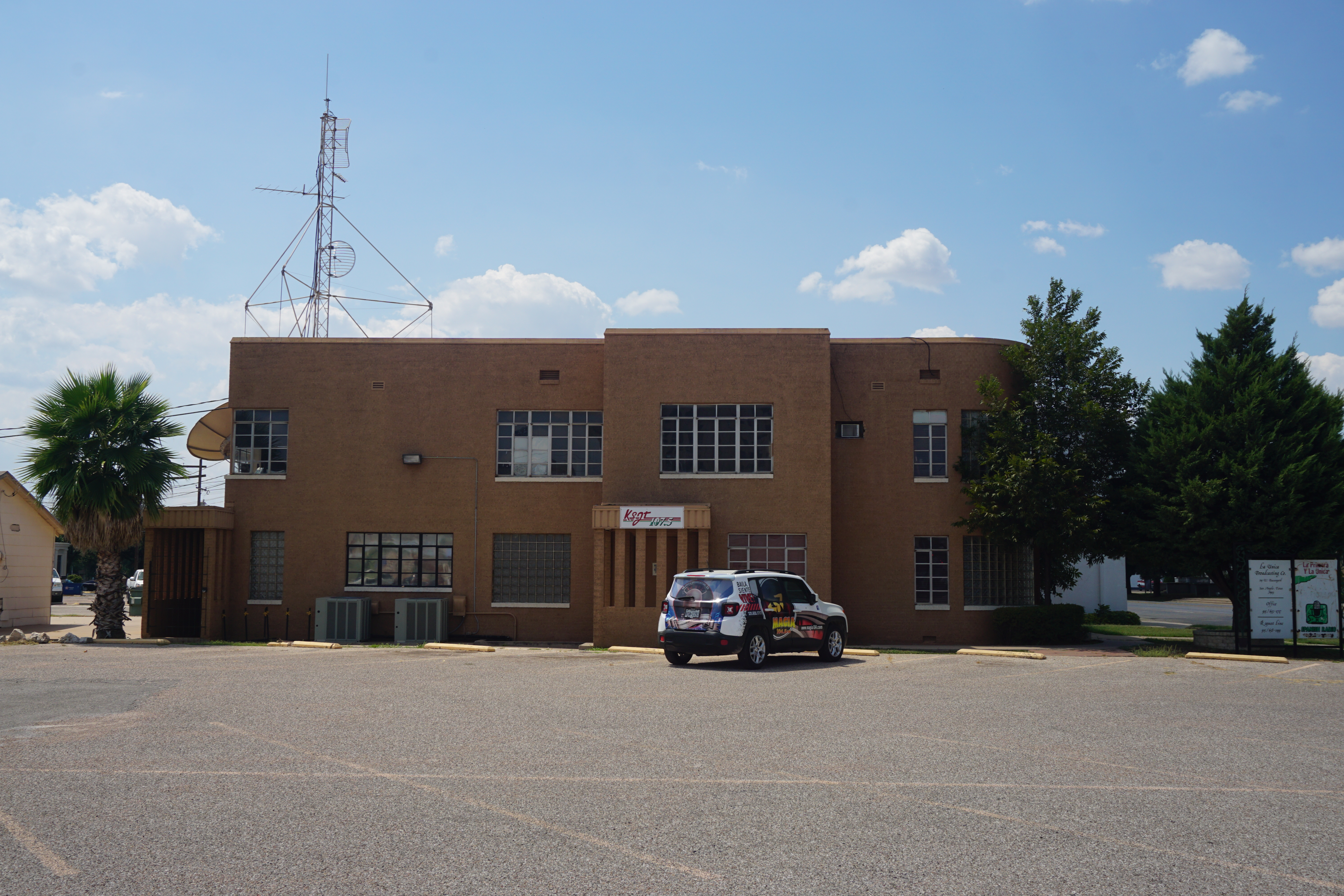
- KSJT Studios
- San Angelo, Texas; United States
- Broadcast area: San Angelo
- Frequency: 107.5 MHz
- Branding: La Grande 107.5

Programming
- Language: Spanish
- Format: Regional Mexican

Ownership
- Owner: La Unica Broadcasting Co.
- Sister stations: KPTJ

History
- Call sign meaning: K, SJT- aeronautical call sign

Technical information
- Licensing authority: FCC
- Facility ID: 36186
- Class: C1
- ERP: 100,000 watts
- HAAT: 184.0 meters (603.7 ft)
- Transmitter coordinates: 31°26′19.00″N 100°34′18.00″W

Links
- Public license information: Public file; LMS
- Webcast: Listen live
- Website: KSJT Online

KSJT-FM (107.5 FM) is a radio station broadcasting a Regional Mexican format. Currently known as "K-107 La Grande", KSJT began in 1985 at a facility on Oakes St. in San Angelo and later moved studios to the current location, 209 W. Beuaregard. Licensed to San Angelo, Texas, United States, the station serves the San Angelo area. The station is currently owned by La Unica Broadcasting Co.
