= Cristina E. Martinez =

American Latina lesbian activist

Cristina E. Martinez (born November 12, 1961, in San Angelo, Texas) is a nationally recognized community activist, business owner and non-profit volunteer and the CEO of Mad Clik, Inc., a corporation in Texas. Openly lesbian, she is the owner and publisher of Gay & Lesbian Rainbow Pages, President of "MD Marketing & Advertising", and co-owner of Rainbow Graphics, a graphic design firm whose focus is to produce effective ad campaigns that cater to and target the LGBT community.

She serves on the boards of the following organizations: UNID@S, a Latin@ GLBT non-profit national group, Houston Gay & Lesbian Chamber of Commerce, GALLO, Gay And Lesbian Latin Organization which she co-founded, Houston Black Tie Dinner, Inc., Executive and Professional Association of Houston EPAH, ICOH, Imperial Court of Houston and several other organizations in which she serves as a volunteer. She is also a member of HRC (Human Rights Campaign) as well as a Federal Club Member.

In April 2008 she founded the San Antonio LGBT Chamber of Commerce The success of her directory has made her a household name in Texas and many articles and stories have been written about her and her publications. Logo TV did a story about her on their show US of Ant regarding her decision to bring home and adopt a 16-year-old mixed race teen who found himself homeless after his family discovered he was gay. Her multiple businesses have received several awards from organizations and other businesses. Most of her awards are for her directories, Gay & Lesbian Rainbow Pages and for her contributions as a business and as an individual to several non-profit organizations in Texas. For 8 of her 10 years in business she has been named "Female Business Woman of the Year" by OutSmart Magazine readers in Houston, Texas.

In September 2008 she was nominated by the WNBA Houston Comets and State Farm Insurance as a finalist for the Houston's Most Inspiring Hispanic Woman and won the award. In December 2008 she entered a national business competition for women called Count Me In, Make Mine a Million where she was chosen as a finalist and then as the winner.

In 2015, she created Laca Agency, where she assists people with their insurance and tax needs choosing to focus on the needs of the LGBT community. In 2016 she co-founded Brighter Future Foundation, an organization that helps smaller non-profits reach their financial goals. Currently, her focus is in helping raise funds to create Houston's LGBT Museum by doing the Timeless History gala, a yearly black-tie event where the focus is on "Preserving the past for our future". Also in 2016 she founded Latino LGBTQ Gay Pride better known as Orgullo (Pride). Tired of there being no representation of Latinos in the annual gay pride event, she decided to create an organization that will produce a yearly Festival Del Orgullo (Pride Festival) for all LGBTQ Latinos and allies in the community.

== See also ==
- LGBT rights in Texas
