= Veribest Independent School District =

School district in Texas

Coordinates: 31°28′37″N 100°15′31″W

Veribest Independent School District is a public school district based in the community of Veribest, Texas (USA).

== Academic achievement ==
In 2009, the school district was rated "academically acceptable" by the Texas Education Agency.

== Schools ==
Veribest ISD has two campuses - Veribest High (Grades 9–12) and Veribest Elementary/Junior High (Grades PK-8).

== Special programs ==
=== Athletics ===
Veribest High School plays six-man football, and went to the playoffs in football in 2016 and 2017. They also have made the playoffs in basketball in 2007, 2008, and 2018.

== See also ==
- List of school districts in Texas
