= South Concho River =

Coordinates: 31.2263°N 100.5036°W

- The 2007 flood of South Concho River

Location
- Country: United States
- State: Texas

The South Concho River is one of the few rivers in Texas to run south to north for its entire length. Rising from Anson Springs some 4 miles (6.4 km) south of Christoval, Texas, in Tom Green County, it flows north through the town of Christoval, then continues north for 13 miles (21 km) before it joins the Middle Concho to form Twin Buttes Reservoir in what is now southwest San Angelo. When released, the river flows through Lake Nasworthy, and continues north to join the North Concho River at Bell St. in east San Angelo. The river is known for its cool, clear, deep water and its pecan-covered banks. Watercress grows in the shallows along the banks.

Because it is unique in the southwestern landscape, it was a landmark favored by both Indians and early Anglo travelers. An important stopover on the Comanche War Trail, the South Concho was also a welcome resting place for early Anglos heading west across Texas. Susan Peak, a unique mesa on the southern Edwards Plateau is located just southeast of Anson Springs, making the springs particularly easy for early travelers to locate.

Today, the South Concho River is a popular recreational spot for residents in the area. The public can access the water at Pugh Park or the low-water crossing in Christoval, Texas. Public access is also possible at the Mineral Wells crossing, some 2 miles north of Christoval. These parks are maintained by Tom Green County, and offer free access to the river. Overnight camping is allowed in the parks.

== See also ==
- List of rivers of Texas
