= San Angelo, Texas =

San Angelo
- City
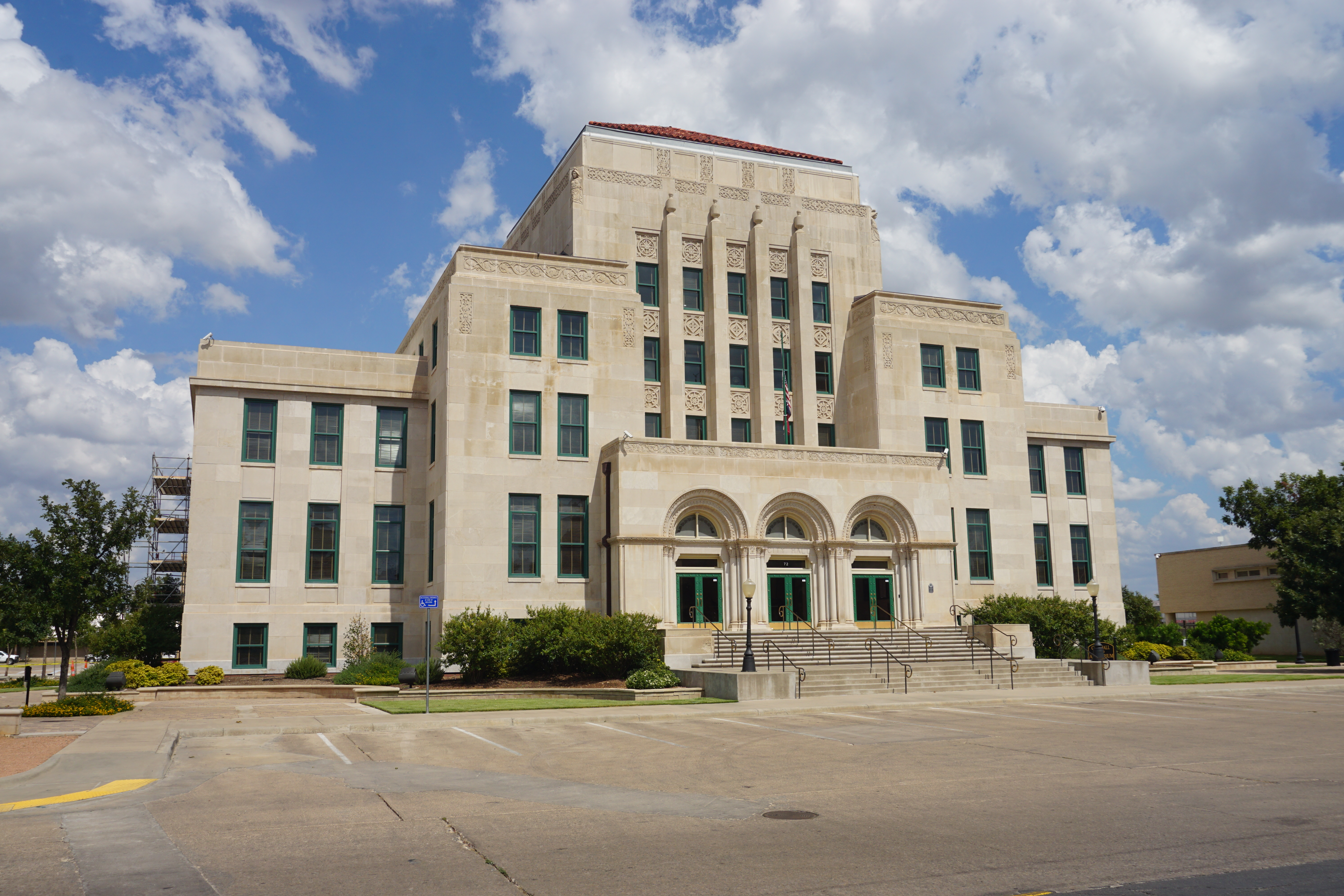
- San Angelo City Hall

- Seal

- Location in the state of Texas

- Location in the state of Texas San Angelo (the United States)
- Coordinates: 31°26′34″N 100°27′1″W
- Country: United States
- State: Texas
- County: Tom Green

Government
  - Type: Council-manager
  - City Council: Mayor Tom Thompson; Tommy Hiebert (District 1); Tom Thompson (District 2); Harry Thomas (District 3); Lucy Gonzales (District 4); Karen Hessee Smith (District 5); Larry Miller (District 6)

Area
  - City: 61.92 sq mi (160.38 km^{2})
  - Land: 59.64 sq mi (154.46 km^{2})
  - Water: 2.28 sq mi (5.91 km^{2})
- Elevation: 1,844 ft (562 m)

Population (2020)
  - City: 100,703
  - Density: 1,688.6/sq mi (651.97/km^{2})
  - Metro: 121,516
  - Demonym: San Angeloan
- Time zone: UTC−6 (CST)
  - Summer (DST): UTC−5 (CDT)
- ZIP codes: 76901-09
- Area code: 325
- FIPS code: 48-64472
- GNIS feature ID: 1375953
- Website: The City of San Angelo, Texas

San Angelo (/sæn ˈændʒəloʊ/ SAN AN-jə-loh) is a city in and the county seat of Tom Green County, Texas, United States. It is in the Concho Valley, a region of West Texas between the Permian Basin to the northwest, Chihuahuan Desert to the southwest, Osage Plains to the northeast, and Central Texas to the southeast. According to the 2020 United States Census, San Angelo had a population of 99,893. It is the principal city and center of the San Angelo metropolitan area, which had a population of 100,159.

San Angelo is home to Angelo State University, historic Fort Concho, and Goodfellow Air Force Base. It is home to the Concho Valley Baptist Association and is the seat of the Roman Catholic Diocese of San Angelo.

== History ==
In 1632, a short-lived mission of Franciscans under Spanish auspices was founded in the area to serve native people. The mission was led by the friars Juan de Salas and Juan de Ortega, with Ortega remaining for six months. The area was visited by the Castillo-Martin expedition of 1650 and the Diego de Guadalajara expedition of 1654.

During the region's development, San Angelo was at the western edge of the area called Texas, successively claimed in the 1800s by Spain, Mexico, the Republic of Texas, and finally the United States in 1846.

The city of San Angelo was founded in 1867, when the United States built Fort Concho, one of a series of forts designed to protect the frontier. The fort was home to cavalry, infantry, and the famous Black Cavalry, also known as buffalo soldiers by American Indians.

The settler Bartholomew J. DeWitt founded the village of Santa Angela outside the fort at the junction of the North and South Concho Rivers. He named the village after his wife, Carolina Angela. The name was eventually changed to San Angela. It changed again to San Angelo in 1883 on the insistence of the United States Postal Service, as "San Angela" is ungrammatical in Spanish. The town became a trade center for farmers and settlers in the area, as well as a fairly lawless cowtown filled with brothels, saloons, and gambling houses.

By the early 1880s a small number of Chinese immigrants also lived in the area; testimony in an 1884 murder case describes Chinese men growing vegetables on a farm near the town for sale in San Angelo, and a laundry in town run by a Chinese man.

After being designated as the county seat, the town grew quickly in the 1880s, aided by being on the route of newly constructed railroads. It became a central transportation hub for the region. The Santa Fe Railroad arrived in 1888 and the Kansas City, Mexico and Orient Railway in 1909. After a tuberculosis (TB) outbreak hit the U.S. in the early 1900s, many patients moved to San Angelo. At the time, doctors could only recommend rest in dry, warm climates. TB sufferers went to San Angelo for treatment, and a sanitarium was built in nearby Carlsbad.

In 1928, the city founded San Angelo College, one of the region's first institutes of higher education. The city had been passed over by the Texas State Legislature to be the home of what would become Texas Tech University. San Angelo College, one of the first municipal colleges, has grown to become Angelo State University. The military returned to San Angelo during World War II with the founding of Goodfellow Air Force Base, which was assigned to train pilots. San Angelo grew exponentially during the oil boom of the 1900s, when vast amounts of oil were found in the area, and the city became a regional hub of the oil and gas industry.

The San Angelo Independent School District is a public school district based in San Angelo, and was one of the first in Texas to integrate, doing so voluntarily in 1955.

San Angelo was famous for the Miss Wool of America Pageant, an annual event organized by the National Wool Growers Association (U.S.).

== Geography ==
According to the United States Census Bureau, the city has an area of 58.2 sq mi (150.9 km^{2}), of which 2.3 sq mi (6.1 km^{2}) (4.03%) are covered by water.

San Angelo is on the northwestern edge of the Edwards Plateau and the northeastern edge of the Chihuahuan Desert at the junction of the North and South Concho Rivers. The city has three lakes: Twin Buttes Reservoir, O.C. Fisher Reservoir, and Lake Nasworthy. The Middle Concho River joined the South Concho several miles upstream, but the confluence has been obscured by the Twin Buttes dam.

San Angelo is about 225 miles (362 km) west of Austin.

=== Climate ===
San Angelo falls near the boundary between the subtropical semiarid scrubland (Köppen BSh) and midlatitude scrubland climates (Köppen BSk). It is in the region where Central Texas meets West Texas weather. Temperatures reach 100 °F (37.8 °C) about 30.1 days per year on average. In 2011, San Angelo recorded 100 days of 100 °F (37.8 °C) or higher. The typical year has 60.3 days with lows below freezing. Snow and sleet occur a few times a year. The city has an average annual precipitation of 20.94 inches (532 mm), with the wettest calendar year being 2016, with 35.72 inches (907.3 mm), and the driest 1956, with 7.41 inches (188.2 mm).

Climate data for San Angelo, Texas, 1991–2020 normals, extremes 1907–present
Month	Jan	Feb	Mar	Apr	May	Jun	Jul	Aug	Sep	Oct	Nov	Dec	Year
Record high °F (°C)	91 (33)	97 (36)	100 (38)	107 (42)	110 (43)	114 (46)	111 (44)	112 (44)	107 (42)	102 (39)	93 (34)	91 (33)	114 (46)
Mean maximum °F (°C)	80.3 (26.8)	84.4 (29.1)	89.6 (32.0)	95.7 (35.4)	101.2 (38.4)	102.9 (39.4)	104.2 (40.1)	103.7 (39.8)	99.1 (37.3)	93.6 (34.2)	84.5 (29.2)	80.0 (26.7)	106.4 (41.3)
Mean daily maximum °F (°C)	60.0 (15.6)	64.4 (18.0)	71.7 (22.1)	80.5 (26.9)	87.5 (30.8)	93.3 (34.1)	96.0 (35.6)	95.4 (35.2)	88.2 (31.2)	79.7 (26.5)	68.3 (20.2)	60.9 (16.1)	78.8 (26.0)
Daily mean °F (°C)	45.8 (7.7)	50.2 (10.1)	57.5 (14.2)	65.7 (18.7)	74.2 (23.4)	80.9 (27.2)	83.3 (28.5)	82.9 (28.3)	76.0 (24.4)	66.2 (19.0)	54.8 (12.7)	47.2 (8.4)	65.4 (18.6)
Mean daily minimum °F (°C)	31.5 (−0.3)	36.0 (2.2)	43.2 (6.2)	51.0 (10.6)	60.8 (16.0)	68.6 (20.3)	70.6 (21.4)	70.4 (21.3)	63.7 (17.6)	52.7 (11.5)	41.4 (5.2)	33.5 (0.8)	52.0 (11.1)
Mean minimum °F (°C)	18.2 (−7.7)	21.0 (−6.1)	25.3 (−3.7)	33.6 (0.9)	45.1 (7.3)	59.6 (15.3)	65.4 (18.6)	63.1 (17.3)	49.5 (9.7)	35.2 (1.8)	24.2 (−4.3)	19.7 (−6.8)	15.5 (−9.2)
Record low °F (°C)	1 (−17)	−1 (−18)	8 (−13)	23 (−5)	35 (2)	42 (6)	54 (12)	45 (7)	35 (2)	19 (−7)	12 (−11)	−4 (−20)	−4 (−20)
Average precipitation inches (mm)	0.90 (23)	1.17 (30)	1.57 (40)	1.41 (36)	3.17 (81)	2.28 (58)	1.16 (29)	2.51 (64)	2.38 (60)	2.33 (59)	1.16 (29)	0.90 (23)	20.94 (532)
Average snowfall inches (cm)	0.5 (1.3)	0.4 (1.0)	0.0 (0.0)	0.1 (0.25)	0.0 (0.0)	0.0 (0.0)	0.0 (0.0)	0.0 (0.0)	0.0 (0.0)	0.0 (0.0)	0.0 (0.0)	0.3 (0.76)	1.3 (3.31)
Average precipitation days (≥ 0.01 in)	3.9	4.5	5.5	4.7	7.3	5.4	5.5	6.2	5.7	5.5	3.8	4.3	62.3
Average snowy days (≥ 0.1 in)	0.3	0.5	0.1	0.1	0.0	0.0	0.0	0.0	0.0	0.0	0.0	0.3	1.3
Source 1: NOAA
Source 2: National Weather Service

== Demographics ==
Historical population
Census	Pop.	Note	%±
1890	2,615		—
1910	10,321		—
1920	10,050		−2.6%
1930	25,308		151.8%
1940	25,802		2.0%
1950	52,093		101.9%
1960	58,815		12.9%
1970	63,884		8.6%
1980	73,240		14.6%
1990	84,462		15.3%
2000	88,439		4.7%
2010	93,200		5.4%
2020	99,893		7.2%
2024 (est.)	100,159		0.3%
U.S. Census Bureau Texas Almanac

=== Racial and ethnic composition ===
San Angelo city, Texas – Racial and ethnic composition Note: the US Census treats Hispanic/Latino as an ethnic category. This table excludes Latinos from the racial categories and assigns them to a separate category. Hispanics/Latinos may be of any race.
Race / Ethnicity (NH = Non-Hispanic)	Pop 2000	Pop 2010	Pop 2020	% 2000	% 2010	% 2020
White alone (NH)	52,934	50,663	48,114	59.85%	54.36%	48.17%
Black or African American alone (NH)	4,013	3,887	3,846	4.54%	4.17%	3.85%
Native American or Alaska Native alone (NH)	307	350	293	0.35%	0.38%	0.29%
Asian alone (NH)	812	989	1,639	0.92%	1.06%	1.64%
Native Hawaiian or Pacific Islander alone (NH)	50	70	135	0.06%	0.08%	0.14%
Other race alone (NH)	85	116	314	0.10%	0.12%	0.31%
Mixed race or multiracial (NH)	917	1,263	3,243	1.04%	1.36%	3.25%
Hispanic or Latino (any race)	29,321	35,862	42,039	33.15%	38.48%	42.35%
Total	88,439	93,200	99,893	100.00%	100.00%	100.00%

=== 2020 census ===
As of the 2020 census, San Angelo had a population of 99,893, with 23,026 families residing in the city. The median age was 35.1 years.

About 23.3% of residents were under 18 and 16.6% were 65 or older. For every 100 females, there were 95.8 males, and for every 100 females 18 and over, there were 94.2 males 18 and over.

About 98.7% of residents lived in urban areas, while 1.3% lived in rural areas.

Of the 39,454 households in San Angelo, 30.6% had children under 18 living in them, 41.9% were married-couple households, 21.1% were households with a male householder and no spouse or partner present, and 29.8% were households with a female householder and no spouse or partner present. About 30.6% of all households were made up of individuals, and 12.3% had someone living alone who was 65 or older.

The city had 43,316 housing units, of which 8.9% were vacant. The homeowner vacancy rate was 1.7% and the rental vacancy rate was 8.3%.

Racial composition as of the 2020 census
Race	Number	Percent
White	62,711	62.8%
Black or African American	4,355	4.4%
American Indian and Alaska Native	877	0.9%
Asian	1,728	1.7%
Native Hawaiian and other Pacific Islander	166	0.2%
Some other race	11,199	11.2%
Two or more races	18,857	18.9%

=== 2010 census ===
As of the census of 2010, 93,200 people, 36,117 households, and 22,910 families resided in the city. The population density was 1,601 people/sq mi (618/km^{2}). The racial makeup of the city was about 83.0% White, 5.4% African American, 1.4% Native American, 1.7% Asian, 11.3% from other races, and 2.6% from two or more races. Hispanics or Latinos of any race were 38.5% of the population.

Of the 36,117 households, 27.6% had children under 18 living with them, 44.2% were married couples living together, 14.2% had a female householder with no husband present, and 36.6% were not families. About 29.8% of all households were made up of individuals, and 11.2% had someone living alone who was 65 or older. The average household size was 2.45 and the average family size was 3.05.

In the city, the age distribution was 23.4% under 18 and 13.8% who were 65 or older. The median age was 32.8 years. The population was 48.7% male and 51.3% female.

The median income for a household in the city was $38,777, and for a family was $49,640. Males had a median income of $33,257 versus $26,750 for females. The per capita income for the city was $20,970. About 13.9% of families and 17.4% of the population were below the poverty line, including 25.4% of those under age 18 and 10.5% of those age 65 or over.

== Economy ==
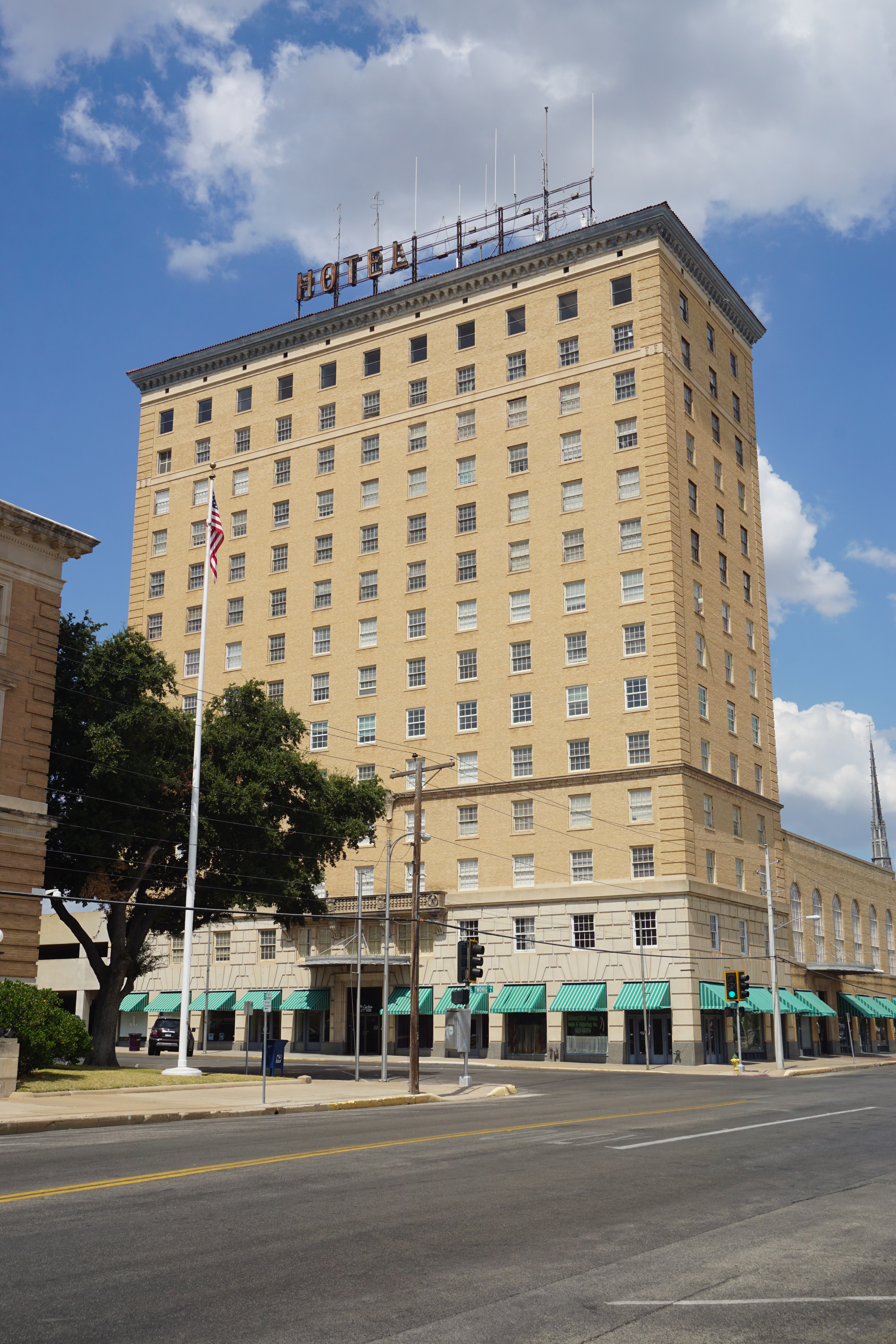
Cactus Hotel building

San Angelo has consistently been ranked by many sources as one of the best small cities for business and employment. In 2013, it ranked fourth in the nation in Forbes magazine's "Best Small Cities For Jobs" rankings. In 2010, Kiplinger's Personal Finance named San Angelo one of the "Best Cities of the Next Decade". In 2009, CNN Money ranked San Angelo as one of the best cities in which to launch a small business.

San Angelo has a diverse economy for a city of its size. Although most oil fields lie to the west, many oil-field service companies based in the city employ a large number of residents. San Angelo's agricultural industry remains strong. Producer's Livestock Auction is the nation's largest for sheep and lambs, and is among the top five in the nation for cattle auctions. Though most agricultural work is done outside the city, thousands of employees work in the cattle and lamb meat-processing industries, and many more in agriculture supporting roles in the city. Two agricultural research centers are in San Angelo: the Angelo State University Management Instruction and Research Center and the Texas A&M Texas AgriLife Research and Extension Center at San Angelo.

The telecommunication industry is a major employer in San Angelo. Sitel has a call center there. Frontier Communications, Performant Recovery Inc. (formerly DCS), a debt recovery corporation, and Blue Cross all employ over 1,000 people each locally. San Angelo serves as the regional medical center for west-central Texas. Shannon Medical Center employs over 3,000 in San Angelo and provides services to a large region of west-central Texas. The manufacturing industry has seen hits since the 1990s, but many large employers still remain, including Ethicon, a division of Johnson & Johnson, Conner Steel, and Hirschfield Steel.

San Angelo's large institutional employers include Shannon Medical Center, Angelo State University, and Goodfellow Air Force Base. The last remains the largest employer in the region, employing or providing income for over 24,000 in San Angelo.

The Sunset Mall, the area's major shopping mall, opened in 1979.

== Arts and culture ==
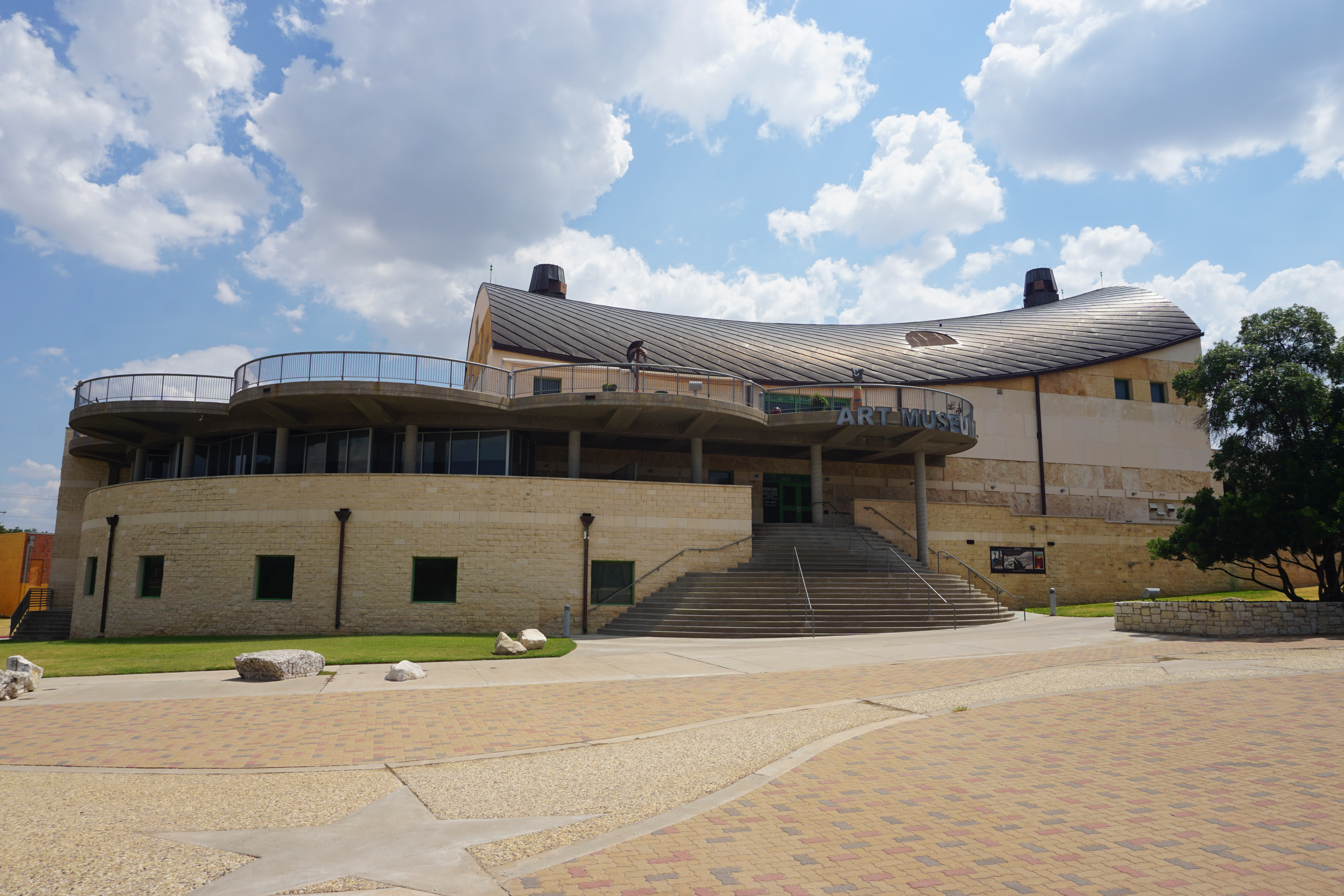
San Angelo Museum of Fine Arts

=== San Angelo Museum of Art ===
The San Angelo Museum of Fine Arts opened in 1999 in downtown San Angelo on the banks of the Concho River, built with local limestone and end-grain Texas mesquite. It attracts over 85,000 visitors a year, and is home to the National Ceramic Competition.

=== San Angelo Performing Arts Center ===
The San Angelo Performing Arts Center (SAPAC) provides access to the highest level of performing arts by presenting local, national, and international touring shows at two historic venues: the 1,350-seat 1928 Murphey Auditorium and the Stephens Performing Arts Center (formerly a Coca-Cola factory), which contains the 300-seat Brooks and Bates Theater, a black-box theater, seven ballet studios, and administrative spaces. Since its inaugural 2017–18 season, SAPAC has hosted over 100 performances annually.

=== Art galleries ===
Downtown San Angelo is home to a collection of art galleries. The San Angelo Museum of Fine Arts; Art in Uncommon Places has an outdoor Pop Art Museum and maintains Paintbrush Alley. A free trolley service is available to the public during Downtown Stroll events.

=== San Angelo Symphony ===
The San Angelo Symphony, founded in 1949, presents five concerts a year. They take place on the first Saturdays of October, November, December, and February in the Murphey Performance Hall. The last concert of the season is at Angelo State's Junell Center on the last Saturday of March.

=== Angelo Civic Theatre ===
Angelo Civic Theatre is Texas's oldest community theater. It was founded on November 21, 1885, to raise resources for a town clock at the county courthouse. Wavering economic times and two world wars paused artistic efforts in the community, but theatrical productions continued. In 1950, Angelo Civic Theatre gained nonprofit status and a sustainable form of theater was established. In 1969‚ a fire demolished the school building in which the theater was housed. The theater performed at various locations for 13 years, until purchasing the 230-seat historic Parkway Theater in 1980. Angelo Civic Theatre continues to serve San Angelo, producing six in-house plays a year.

=== Ballet San Angelo ===
Ballet San Angelo was founded in 1983 for the purpose of presenting an annual production of The Nutcracker. It offers a full season of productions, including a choreography performance and a Children's Ballet. Ballet San Angelo also offers ballet training for students, a fitness program, a scholarship, and a community outreach program.

=== Plays at Angelo State University ===
Through "The Arts at ASU", Angelo State University puts on six plays a year open to the general public. These range from dinner theater and theater-in-the-round to conventional productions, using the nation's only active modular theater. The university also presents numerous concerts and recitals and has numerous displays in the Angelo State University Art Gallery.

== Parks and recreation ==
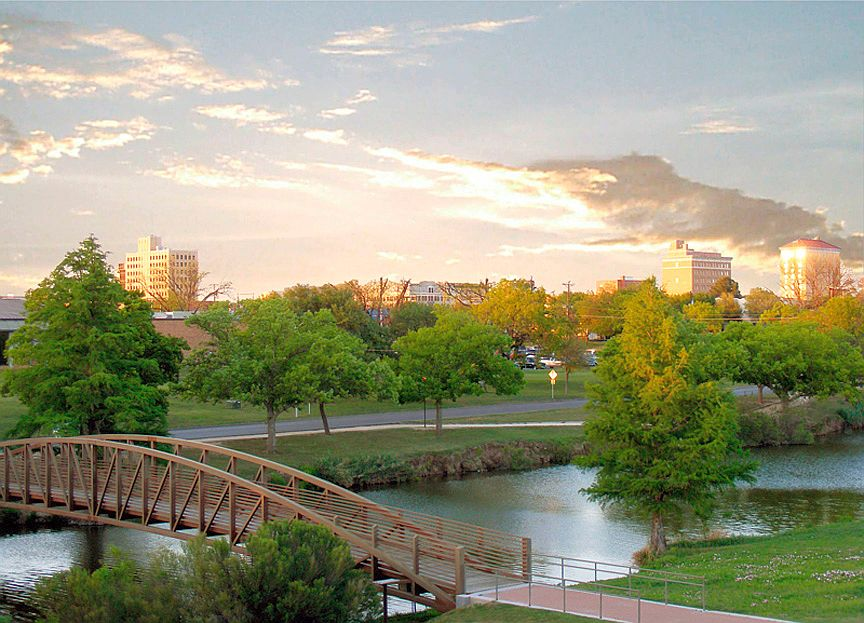
Pedestrian bridge at a park running along the Concho River

=== City park system ===
The San Angelo City Park system was created in 1903. The city has 32 parks with over 375 acres (1.52 km^{2}) of developed land. The department maintains a 33-acre municipal golf course (Santa Fe Park Golf Course) along the river, 25 playgrounds, and 25 sports practice fields.

The "crown jewels" of the parks system are the parks that make up the 10 miles (16 km) of river frontage on the Concho River winding through downtown and beyond. The parks feature many plazas, public art displays, and numerous water features. The city is home to the International Water Lily Collection. The park contains over 300 varieties of water lilies, one of the largest collections in the world.

The city also provides several municipal parks on Lake Nasworthy, one of three lakes near the city; the others are Twin Buttes Reservoir and O.C. Fisher Reservoir.

=== San Angelo State Park ===
The 7,677-acre (3,107 ha) San Angelo State Park, owned and maintained by the Texas Parks and Wildlife Department, is located on the shores of the O.C. Fisher Reservoir. Many activities are available within the park, including camping, picnicking, and swimming, as well as hiking, mountain biking, orienteering, and horseback riding on over 50 miles (80 km) of developed trails. The park is home to the official State of Texas Longhorn herd.

=== San Angelo Nature Center ===
The San Angelo Nature Center closed permanently in 2022. It was located at Lake Nasworthy. It featured many native and exotic animals, including alligators, bobcats, prairie dogs, tortoises, and 85 different species of reptiles, including 22 different species of rattlesnakes. The center included the Spring Creek Wetland, which had 260 acres (110 ha) being developed by the Federal Bureau of Reclamation, including a 7-mile (11 km) trail; its terrain varied from a semiarid environment to a freshwater marsh. It also maintained the one-mile (1.6-km) nature trail off Spillway Road.

=== Fort Concho ===
Historic Fort Concho, a National Historic Landmark maintained by the city of San Angelo, was founded in 1867 by the United States Army to protect settlers and maintain vital trade routes. The restored site is home to several museums, and is open to visitors Tuesday through Sunday. Fort Concho is one of nine forts along the Texas Forts Trail.

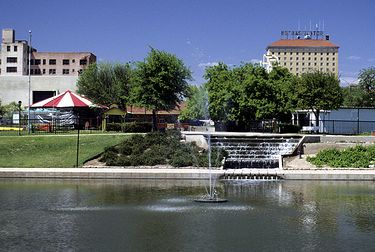
Fountains on the Concho River

=== San Angelo Stock Show and Rodeo ===
The San Angelo Stock Show and Rodeo is held annually. It began in 1932, making it one of the longest-running rodeos in the world. It is nationally renowned within the rodeo circuit, bringing in the top contestants and ranking as one of top-10 rodeos in the nation for monetary prizes awarded to contestants. It includes a parade, carnival, and concerts, and many other events in addition to the main stock show and rodeo.

== Education ==
=== Higher education ===
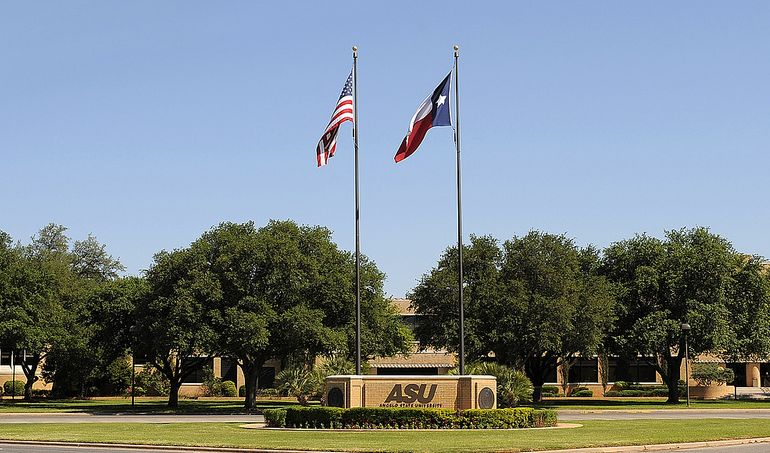
Main entrance at Angelo State University

San Angelo is home to Angelo State University. Founded in 1928, it enrolls about 10,000 students, who come from almost every county in Texas, 40 states, and 24 countries. One of the nation's premier regional universities, it was featured in the Princeton Review Best 373. The only other two listed from the state were Texas A&M University and the University of Texas at Austin.

Angelo State offers almost 100 different undergraduate programs and 23 graduate programs, including three doctoral programs. The university is divided into six colleges: Business, Education, Liberal and Fine Arts, Nursing and Allied Health, Sciences, and Graduate Studies. It has been a member of the Texas Tech University System since 2007.

San Angelo has a branch of Howard College, which is based in Big Spring, Texas. The two-year school prepares students academically for transfer to a four-year university, and concentrates in technical and occupational fields of study that lead to certificates and/or associate in applied science degrees.

A branch of Park University is on the Goodfellow Air Force Base. The Goodfellow Campus Center has been providing higher education to the Concho Valley area since 1989. Park University's main campus was established in 1875 in Parkville, Missouri.

San Angelo is also home to a branch of American Commercial College, a private for-profit career college. It offers seven career certificate programs.

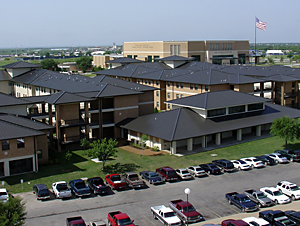
Texan Hall on Angelo State University Campus

=== Public primary and secondary education ===
Almost all of San Angelo is in the San Angelo Independent School District. Small parts are within the Wall Independent School District (southeast San Angelo), the Grape Creek Independent School District (northwest San Angelo), and the Veribest Independent School District. The two main high schools are Central and Lake View (of San Angelo ISD). Three middle schools and 15 elementary schools are within San Angelo city limits.

=== Private and alternative education ===
Eight private schools operate in the city, certified through the 12th grade, which include Ambleside School of San Angelo (a member of Ambleside Schools International), San Angelo Christian Academy, the Angelo Catholic School (only up to eighth grade), Cornerstone Christian School, Gateway Christian Academy, Trinity Lutheran School, Potter's Hand Christian School, Premier High School (a charter school), and Texas Leadership Charter Academy (a charter school).

== Media ==
=== Newspapers ===
- San Angelo Standard-Times (print)
- GoSanAngelo (digital)

=== Television ===
Channel	Call letters	Network
3	KSAN	NBC
6	KIDY	Fox; MyNetworkTV (DT2)
8	KLST	CBS
31	KANG-LD	UniMás
38	KTXE-LD	ABC; The CW Plus (DT2)
41	KEUS-LP	Univision

=== Radio ===
==== AM stations ====
Frequency	Call letters	Format
960	KGKL (AM)	News/Talk
1260	KKSA	News/Talk
1400	KRUN (AM)	Traditional Country

==== FM stations ====
Frequency	Call letters	Format
88.5	KLRW	Christian Contemporary
89.3	KNAR	Christian Contemporary
90.1	KNCH	Public Radio
90.5	K213EW	Christian Contemporary
90.9	KLTP	Christian Contemporary
91.5	KPDE	Religious
91.9	KMEO	Religious
92.9	KDCD	Country
93.9	KSAO	Christian Contemporary
94.7	KIXY	Top 40
95.5	KMLS	Classic Rock
96.5	KNRX	Active Rock
97.1	KCSA-LP	Variety
97.5	KGKL-FM	Country
98.7	KELI-FM	Top 40 CHR
99.5	KQTC	Tejano
100.1	KCLL	Classic Hits
101.9	KWFR	Classic Rock
103.1	KKCN	Texas Country
104.5	KPTJ	Spanish
106.1	KMDX	Urban
107.5	KSJT-FM	Spanish

== Infrastructure ==
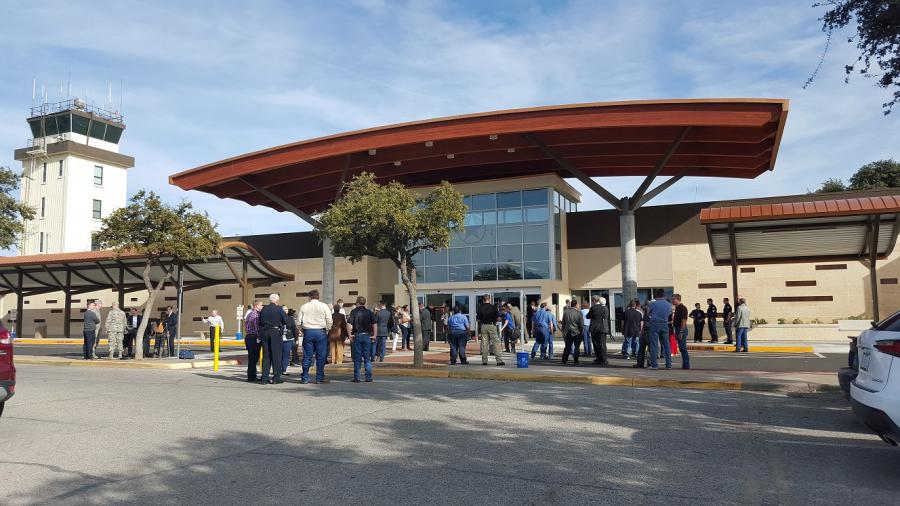
San Angelo Regional Airport

=== Transportation ===
San Angelo is served by the San Angelo Regional Airport, which offers daily flights through Envoy Air to the Dallas Fort Worth International Airport. Intrastate and interstate bus service is provided by Greyhound, with regularly scheduled service to major cities in Texas and nationwide. Intracity public transportation is provided by the Concho Valley Transit District, with five fixed bus routes and transfers provided at the Santa Fe station. The bus service runs from 6:30 am to 6:30 pm, Monday through Saturday. Taxi service is available throughout the city by Red Ball Taxi and Shuttle, Checker Cab, All American Cab, and Yellow Cab.

The Texas Pacifico provides freight service to the city along a TxDOT-owned rail line.

== Notable people ==
- Jane Ford Aebersold (born 1941), artist
- Jay Presson Allen (1922–2006), screenwriter and playwright
- Robert Nason Beck (1928–2008), pioneer researcher of uses of radioactive materials, such as technetium-99, for medical imaging using positron emission tomography, was born and has family in San Angelo
- John Boles (1895–1969), American actor in silent movies through the 1950s, spent his retirement in San Angelo
- Frank "Bring'em Back Alive" Buck (1884–1950), lived in San Angelo in 1940s and 1950s
- Gary Lee Conner, former Screaming Trees guitarist, resides in San Angelo
- Paula DeAnda (born 1989), singer, was born in San Angelo
- Colby Donaldson (born 1974), Survivor contestant and actor, was born just outside San Angelo and lived in the city
- Jeff Drost (born 1964), former NFL player, was born in San Angelo
- Felicia Elizondo (1946–2021), LGBT activist and trans woman, was born in San Angelo
- Joe Feagin (born 1938), Texas A&M University professor, was born in San Angelo
- Sterlin Gilbert (born 1978), football coach
- James Gill (born 1934), pop artist
- Crawford Goldsby, also known as "Cherokee Bill" (1876–1896), was born in Fort Concho (across the Concho River from San Angelo)
- Paul Roderick Gregory (born 1941), economist and specialist in the Kennedy assassination and Soviet planned administration
- Dorsey B. Hardeman (1902–1992), mayor of San Angelo, 1936–1938, served 26 years in both houses of the Texas State Legislature; he was an advocate of water expansion in West Texas
- Pierce Holt, College Football Hall of Fame member, attended Angelo State University; he played for the San Francisco 49ers and Atlanta Falcons in 1990s, and was a two-time Pro Bowl selection
- David Hulse (born 1968), former Major Leaguer, attended Central High School; he played for the Texas Rangers and Milwaukee Brewers in the 1990s
- Elmer Kelton (1926–2009), award-winning western writer, journalist, and novelist; lived in San Angelo
- Steve Kemp (born 1954), former Major League Baseball outfielder, was born in San Angelo
- Colleen R. LaRose, indicted in March 2010 after trying to recruit Islamic terrorists to wage jihad and murder a Swedish artist
- Los Lonely Boys, Grammy-winning musical group from San Angelo
- Greg Maddux (born 1966), four-time Cy Young Award-winning baseball pitcher and Hall of Fame inductee, was born in San Angelo
- Cristina E. Martinez (born 1961), nationally recognized community activist, business owner and non-profit volunteer; born in San Angelo
- Bill McGill (1939–2014), professional basketball player, and top pick of the 1962 NBA draft, was born in San Angelo
- Marc Menchaca (born 1975), actor; born in San Angelo
- John H. Miller (1925–2025), Marine Lieutenant general; born in San Angelo
- Shea Morenz, graduate of San Angelo Central and former Texas Longhorns quarterback, was drafted by the New York Yankees
- Fess Parker (1924–2010), actor; grew up on a ranch near San Angelo
- August Pfluger (born December 28, 1978), US Representative for Texas's 11th congressional district and Air Force Reserve Lieutenant Colonel; graduated from San Angelo Central
- Cliff Richey (born 1946), professional tennis player, won 45 career singles titles, is the 1970 World Grand Prix champion, a two-time Davis Cup champion, the number-one ranked U.S. player in 1970, and co-author of Acing Depression: A Tennis Champion's Toughest Match; he was born in San Angelo and resides there
- Nancy Richey (born 1942), professional tennis player, won six Grand Slam titles, and was inducted into International Tennis Hall of Fame 2003; she was born in San Angelo and resides there
- Lucy A. Snyder, Bram Stoker Award winner and novelist, grew up in San Angelo; she used a fictional version of the city as a setting in some of her work
- Jack Teagarden (1905–1964), jazz trombonist and vocalist
- Steve Trash, illusionist, was born in San Angelo
- Ernest Tubb (1914–1984), musician and member of the Country Music Hall of Fame, worked for several years in San Angelo, and had a daily live music show on a local radio station prior to going to Nashville
- Akash Vukoti (born 2009), Spelling prodigy and TV personality
- Clayton Weishuhn (1959–2022), professional football player
- Max Lucado (born 1955), best-selling Christian author
- Joe Yonan, journalist, cookbook author and the Food and Dining Editor for The Washington Post

== See also ==
- List of museums in West Texas
- Texas Forts Trail
