= List of tornadoes in the May 1995 tornado outbreak sequence =

The May 1995 tornado outbreak sequence produced 279 tornadoes between May 6 and May 19, 1995, across the Midwestern, Southern and Mid-Atlantic region of the United States. There were three particular outbreaks during that period: those of May 7 to May 9 across the southern Great Plains, May 13–14 across the Ohio and Mississippi Valleys and on May 18—the most intense outbreak—across the Tennessee Valley. Additional tornadoes touched down in the Southeast, the Middle Atlantic and the Central Plains during that period. A total of 13 people were killed during the entire outbreak sequence.

This is the list of confirmed tornadoes during the outbreak from May 6 to May 31, 1995.

== Confirmed tornadoes ==
Confirmed tornadoes by Fujita rating
FU	F0	F1	F2	F3	F4	F5	Total
0	206	107	47	15	8	0	383

=== May 6 event ===
List of confirmed tornadoes – Saturday, May 6, 1995 (Note: All dates are based on the local time zone where the tornado touched down; however, all times are in Coordinated Universal Time for consistency.)
EF#	Location	County / parish	State	Start coord.	Time (UTC)	Path length	Max. width
F0	N of Fort Collins	Larimer	CO	40.67°N 105.08°W	13:15–13:21	0.13 mi (0.21 km)	50 yd (46 m)
F0	A tornado occurred in an open field.						

=== May 7 event ===
List of confirmed tornadoes - May 7, 1995
F#	Location	County	Time (UTC)	Path length	Damage
Texas
F2	W of Amarillo	Randall	0640	12 miles (19.2 km)	1 death – This tornado touched down west of Canyon and lifted three miles southwest of Amarillo, Texas. About twenty homes were destroyed and twelve people were injured. The tornado killed a man who was standing outside his mobile home and was tossed 130 feet (39.6 m). The tornado destroyed the mobile home in whose bathroom his wife and four children were sheltering, but they survived with only minor injuries.
F0	SE of Spearman	Hansford	1305	0.2 miles (0.32 km)	Weak tornado with no damage.
F0	NW of Windthorst	Archer	1805	0.1 miles (0.16 km)	
F0	WNW of Runaway Bay	Jack	2017	0.1 miles (0.16 km)	Weak tornado with no damage.
F0	W of Bridgeport	Wise	2025	0.5 miles (0.8 km)	A maintenance yard was damaged and a few trees were uprooted.
F3	SE of Forestburg to W of Marysville	Montague, Cooke	2110	26 miles (41.6 km)	2 deaths – This tornado destroyed or seriously damaged 30 or more homes, two mobile homes, and numerous barns and outbuildings. It killed two elderly people near Forestburg, and an undetermined number of cattle and cows were also killed. The tornado was .5 miles (0.80 km) at times, and its track merged with that of the next event, below.
F3	Bulcher to W of Ardmore, OK	Cooke (TX), Love (OK), Carter (OK)	2120	34.1 miles (54.6 km)	3 deaths – This tornado formed from the same storm that produced the previous tornado. It crossed the Red River from Texas and hit a campground, the Red River RV Ranch, one mile west of Burneyville in Love County, Oklahoma. Shortly after, it struck the Falconhead Resort at high-end F3 intensity, where it destroyed 20 homes and damaged 20 others, some of which were made of brick. One home was reduced to one exterior wall and some interior walls. Further to the northeast, two elderly women were killed when their small home was blown across the road into a wooded area. One mile further north, an elderly man was killed in the destruction of his small home. This tornado eventually caused $75,000,000 damage at Ardmore, Oklahoma, much of it to a tire plant where extensive exterior damage occurred and vehicles were "stacked on top of one another."
F1	W of Magnolia	Montgomery, San Jacinto	2225	8 miles (12.8 km)	Two homes were destroyed.
F1	Coleman area	Coleman	2252	0.1 miles (0.16 km)	One home was destroyed and several others were damaged.
F0	E of Millersview	Concho	2300	0.2 miles (0.32 km)	
F0	NE of Burkett	Coleman	2322	0.1 miles (0.16 km)	Three homes were damaged and a barn was destroyed.
F0	NNW of Lake Brownwood	Brown	0030	0.1 miles (0.16 km)	Trees and power lines were downed.
F0	Rising Star to W of Gorman	Eastland	0030	18 miles (28.8 km)	Mobile homes, outbuildings and barns were damaged, some heavily.
F1	S of Rising Star	Brown	0100	5 miles (8 km)	One house was heavily damaged and a vacant mobile home and several outbuildings were destroyed.
F2	W of Hunt (1st tornado)	Real	0141	2 miles (3.2 km)	A barn, a mobile home and a half-mile of fencing were destroyed.
F0	S of Mountain Home	Kerr	0210	0.1 miles (0.16 km)	
F0	SW of Johnsville	Erath	0220	0.1 miles (0.16 km)	Several trees were uprooted while one cow was killed and 17 others were injured.
F1	W of Hunt (2nd tornado)	Real	0236	0.1 miles (0.16 km)	One barn was destroyed and mobile homes were overturned.
F2	SE of Mountain Home	Kerr	0236	2 miles (3.2 km)	A grain elevator and a mobile home were destroyed while several cars were blown off Texas State Highway 7.
F1	Haltom City to Grapevine	Tarrant	0315	10 miles (16 km)	485 homes and 27 businesses were damaged in the northern sections of the Dallas–Fort Worth metroplex.
Oklahoma
F0	NNE of McQueen	Greer	2056	0.2 miles (0.32 km)	
F1	Davis area	Murray	2100	2 miles (3.2 km)	
F1	NE of Wynnewood	Garvin	2110	6 miles (9.6 km)	
F1	Mill Creek area	Johnston	2120	0.2 miles (0.32 km)	
F0	NE of Sasakwa	Seminole	2145	0.2 miles (0.32 km)	
F0	SE of Spaulding	Hughes	2155	1 miles (1.6 km)	
F2	E of Yeager	Hughes	2208	6 miles (9.6 km)	A tornado destroyed one barn and two outbuildings. A frame home was severely damaged, and two trailers were moved 75 feet (23 m) as well. The tornado also severely damaged 40 trees.
F1	S of Dougherty	Carter, Murray	2229	3 miles (4.8 km)	
F0	SE of Okemah	Okfuskee	2238	0.1 miles (0.16 km)	Damage to several homes and power lines.
F1	N of Sulphur	Murray	2253	0.1 miles (0.16 km)	
Colorado
F0	SE of Roggen	Weld	2239	0.5 miles (0.8 km)	Weak tornado with no damage.
Missouri
F1	NW of Nashville	Barton	2245	5 miles (8 km)	
F1	NW of Weaubleau	Hickory	0450	0.4 miles (0.6 km)	A farm house, a barn, a shed and utility poles were damaged.
Source: Tornado History Project - Storm Data for May 7, 1995

=== May 8 event ===
List of confirmed tornadoes - May 8, 1995
F#	Location	County	Time (UTC)	Path length	Damage
Mississippi
F1	NW of Berwick to SW of Smithfield	Amite	1915	15 miles (24 km)	Two mobile homes were destroyed and seven homes were damaged.
F2	SW of Morton	Rankin, Scott	2119	7 miles (11.2 km)	One house sustained major damage.
Colorado
F0	N of Paoli	Phillips	2100	0.1 miles (0.16 km)	Weak tornado with no damage.
Nebraska
F1	S of Sterling	Johnson	0115	0.8 miles (1.3 km)	A playhouse was leveled, a shed was damaged, and a roof was lifted off of a house.
F2	SW of Auburn	Nemaha	0122-0130	1.5 miles (2.4 km)	This tornado extensively damaged a house, a farm and outbuildings. A second farmstead was also damaged.
F0	S of Crab Orchard	Johnson	0124	0.1 miles (0.16 km)	Weak tornado with no damage.
F0	Sterling area	Johnson	0130	4 miles (6.4 km)	A steel corn crib was blown off its foundation and the roof of a quonset was blown off.
F0	Brownville area	Nemaha	0130	0.1 miles (0.16 km)	Weak tornado with no damage.
F1	SE of Julian	Nemaha	0142	1 miles (1.6 km)	Two farms were damaged including roof damage to a house, outbuildings and hog barns.
F0	W of Peru	Nemaha	0145	0.1 miles (0.16 km)	Weak tornado with no damage.
F0	NE of Julian	Otoe	0146	0.1 miles (0.16 km)	Weak tornado with no damage.
F0	W of Manley	Cass	0333	0.1 miles (0.16 km)	Weak tornado with no damage.
F0	SW of Wabash	Cass	0334	0.1 miles (0.16 km)	Weak tornado with no damage.
F0	NW of Alvo	Cass	0345	0.1 miles (0.16 km)	Weak tornado with no damage.
F0	W of Alvo	Cass	0346	0.1 miles (0.16 km)	Weak tornado with no damage.
F0	SE of Greenwood	Cass	0346	0.1 miles (0.16 km)	Weak tornado with no damage.
Iowa
F0	SE of Hamburg	Fremont	0258	0.1 miles (0.16 km)	
Louisiana
F2	Arabi area	St. Bernard	0330	0.8 miles (1.3 km)	A brief tornado overturned eight railroad tank cars and significantly damaged commercial buildings.
F1	Slidell area	St. Tammany	0433	2 miles (3.2 km)	25 homes sustained damage, mostly to their roofs.
Source: Tornado History Project - Storm Data for May 8, 1995

=== May 9 event ===
List of confirmed tornadoes - May 9, 1995
F#	Location	County	Time (UTC)	Path length	Damage
Mississippi
F1	Springs area	Jackson	1400	4 miles (6.4 km)	Waterspout and tornado damaging trees, cars and commercial signs.
F1	SW of Big Point	Jackson	1515	1 miles (1.6 km)	Several houses were damaged.
F1	Gulf Hills area	Jackson	0140	0.2 miles (0.32 km)	Brief tornado with minor damage.
F1	NW of Lakeshore	Hancock	0440	0.3 miles (0.48 km)	Weak tornado.
Alabama
F0	NW of Prichard	Mobile	1605	0.1 miles (0.16 km)	Three mobile homes were damaged.
F0	NE of Wiggins	Covington	1930	2 miles (3.2 km)	The side of a mobile home was blown off, a pump house was overturned and trees and power lines were knocked down.
F0	SW of Martins Mill	Talladega	0040	1 miles (1.6 km)	Several structures had minor damage
F0	N of Grand Bay	Mobile	0640	0.1 miles (0.16 km)	Brief tornado with no damage.
Iowa
F0	Muscatine area (1st tornado)	Muscatine	2043	0.5 miles (0.8 km)	Weak tornado with no damage.
F0	Muscatine area (2nd tornado)	Muscatine	2106	0.2 miles (0.32 km)	Weak tornado with no damage.
F0	SE of Moscow	Muscatine	2107	0.5 miles (0.8 km)	Weak tornado with no damage.
F2	SW of Mechanicsville	Cedar	2111	7 miles (11.2 km)	This tornado destroyed several buildings.
F0	NW of Blue Grass	Muscatine	2129	0.2 miles (0.32 km)	A tornado heavily damaged or destroyed buildings on 26 farms. Nine homes were damaged, including one that was destroyed. Rating disputed, ranked F3 by Grazulis.
F0	SE of Stockton	Scott	2150	0.2 miles (0.32 km)	
F3	S of New Liberty	Fremont	2155	10 miles (16 km)	This tornado destroyed several buildings in and near Stockton and New Liberty.
F0	LeClaire area	Scott	2240	0.2 miles (0.32 km)	Weak tornado with no damage.
F0	S of Princeton	Scott	2240	0.2 miles (0.32 km)	Weak tornado with no damage.
F0	N of Donahue	Scott	2240	0.2 miles (0.32 km)	Weak tornado with no damage.
F1	SW of Long Grove	Scott	2245	0.5 miles (0.8 km)	There was damage to a car wash, a business garage, a Kwik shop and an insurance building.
Illinois
F0	NW of Alexander	Morgan	2201	0.1 miles (0.16 km)	One home was damaged and a couple of sheds were destroyed.
F0	NE of Yatesville	Morgan	2205	0.1 miles (0.16 km)	Two homes were damaged and several outbuildings were destroyed.
F1	S of Cordova	Rock Island	2217	3 miles (4.8 km)	
F3	NW of Springfield to S of Waynesville	Sangamon, Menard, Logan, DeWitt	2222	50 miles (80 km)	This long-tracked tornado destroyed four homes and damaged over 100 others as well as businesses, a farm and one school. The tornado lacked a visible condensation funnel at ground level at several points in its life.
F0	Princeton area	Bureau	2225	5 miles (8 km)	
F3	S of Rapids City	Rock Island, Whiteside	2226	25 miles (40 km)	This tornado heavily damaged outbuildings but only "moderately" damaged two farmhouses. Rating disputed, ranked F2 by Grazulis.
F0	W of Cuba	Fulton	2235	0.1 miles (0.16 km)	Weak tornado with no damage.
F0	Canton area	Fulton	2248	3 miles (4.8 km)	Damage to trees and power lines. A communication tower was bent at a 45° angle.
F0	N of Geneseo	Henry	2300	0.1 miles (0.16 km)	One mobile home was blown over on its side
F3	Neponset to S of Harmon	Bureau, Lee	2301	22 miles (35.2 km)	This tornado leveled a two-story farmhouse, leaving only bits of "kindling" behind in the basement.
F3	NE of Albany to SE of Mt. Carroll	Whiteside, Carroll	2301	unknown	This tornado destroyed four homes and 36 farm buildings, while severely damaging several other houses. "Twisted metal" was driven into the ground. The tornado may have tracked for 50 mi (80 km).
F1	South Pekin area	Tazewell	2304	4 miles (6.4 km)	Several barns and four garages were destroyed as well as a railroad workers barracks. One house and a church were also damaged.
F0	E of Harmon	Lee	2325	0.5 miles (0.8 km)	Weak tornado with no damage.
F0	SE of Walshville	Montgomery	2338	0.2 miles (0.32 km)	Brief tornado with no damage.
F0	NW of Hahnaman	Whiteside	2345	1 miles (1.6 km)	Weak tornado with little, if any, damage.
F0	SE of Irving	Montgomery	0000	0.2 miles (0.32 km)	Brief tornado with no damage.
F1	SW of Le Roy	De Witt, McLean	0010	13 miles (20.8 km)	Several outbuildings were destroyed. Three homes were damaged as well.
F1	E of Nokomis	Montgomery	0015	0.7 miles (1.1 km)	Several outbuildings were damaged, with a farm losing a machine shed and grain bin.
F1	SE of Oconee	Shelby	0056	0.1 miles (0.16 km)	Two mobile homes and several outbuildings were destroyed.
F0	SW of Saybrook	McLean	0107	2 miles (3.2 km)	Damage was limited to trees.
F1	N of Saybrook	McLean	0113-0117	3 miles (4.8 km)	Five homes were damaged and several outbuildings were destroyed.
F0	SW of Lakewood	Shelby	0130	1 miles (1.6 km)	Three barns were destroyed and several homes had minor damage.
F1	Thawville area	Ford, Iroquois	0200	5 miles (8 km)	Damage to a porch, two farms, an outbuilding and a brick home.
Source: Tornado History Project - Storm Data for May 9, 1995

=== May 10 event ===
List of confirmed tornadoes - May 10, 1995
F#	Location	County	Time (UTC)	Path length	Damage
Illinois
F0	Momence area	Kankakee	1907	0.5 miles (0.8 km)	Weak tornado with no damage.
Tennessee
F0	W of Whitwell	Marion	2200	1 miles (1.6 km)	Four mobile homes were destroyed.
F1	SW of Athens	McMinn	0325	3 miles (4.8 km)	One barn lost its roof, the side of a building was blown off, a motor home was moved several feet, and a carport was blown down.
Kentucky
F1	SE of Ansel	Pulaski	2200	1 miles (1.6 km)	
F0	N of Pineville	Bell	2305	0.1 miles (0.16 km)	Several barns lost their roofs and numerous trees and power lines were knocked down.
Texas
F2	W of Del Rio	Val Verde	0250	0.5 miles (0.8 km)	This brief tornado damaged several mobile homes, trailers, boats, and houses near Lake Amistad.
F1	Del Rio area	Val Verde	0320	0.1 miles (0.16 km)	Power lines were damaged.
Source: Tornado History Project - Storm Data for May 10, 1995

=== May 11 event ===
List of confirmed tornadoes - May 11, 1995
F#	Location	County	Time (UTC)	Path length	Damage
North Carolina
F1	E of Buena Vista	Bertie	2157	0.1 miles (0.16 km)	Several sheds and outbuildings were damaged.
F0	E of Ulah	Randolph	2326	1 miles (1.6 km)	Damage occurred to trees and power lines.
Florida
F0	Reddick area	Marion	0530	0.1 miles (0.16 km)	A greenhouse and a car were damaged.
Source: Tornado History Project - Storm Data for May 11, 1995

=== May 12 event ===
List of confirmed tornadoes - May 12, 1995
F#	Location	County	Time (UTC)	Path length	Damage
Louisiana
F1	Morgan City area	St. Mary	1800	0.5 miles (0.8 km)	The roof of a building was torn off.
Kansas
F0	N of Colby	Thomas	2012	0.1 miles (0.16 km)	Weak tornado with no damage.
F2	E of Colby	Thomas	2015	18 miles (28.8 km)	This tornado tore roofs off farm residences and storage buildings while destroying transmission towers. Significant crop damage occurred, and one mobile home was destroyed as well.
F2	N of Menlo to NW of Hoxie	Sheridan	2100	14 miles (22.4 km)	Several homes lost their roofs while farm outbuildings were damaged. This tornado may have been continuous with the previous event.
F2	NE of Tasco	Sheridan	2145	0.8 miles (1.3 km)	A brief tornado snapped large trees in open country. Rating disputed, ranked F1 by Grazulis.
F1	E of Studley	Graham	2150	0.2 miles (0.32 km)	
F0	S of Plainville (1st tornado)	Ellis	2320	0.1 miles (0.16 km)	A silo was destroyed.
F0	W of Codell	Rooks	2324	0.1 miles (0.16 km)	
F0	S of Plainville (2nd tornado)	Rooks	2345	0.1 miles (0.16 km)	
F1	SW of Lucas	Russell	0018	4 miles (6.4 km)	Grain bins were destroyed while the roof of a feed store was removed.
F1	W of Denmark	Lincoln	0030	1 miles (1.6 km)	Several farm buildings sustained significant damage.
F0	SE of Bennington	Ottawa	0201	3 miles (4.8 km)	Weak tornado with no damage.
Florida
F0	N of Trenton	Gilchrist	2135	5 miles (8 km)	Damage occurred to trees and power lines.
Colorado
F0	SE of Parker	Douglas	0150	0.2 miles (0.32 km)	Weak tornado with no damage.
Source: Tornado History Project - Storm Data for May 12, 1995

=== May 13 event ===
List of confirmed tornadoes - May 13, 1995
F#	Location	County	Time (UTC)	Path length	Damage
California
F0	SW of Porterville	Tulare	1900	2.5 miles (4.02 km)	A very brief tornado would impact the Porterville Airport at noon, destroying two aircraft, inflicting minor roof damage to the administration buildings, downing fences, and destroying farms. Heavy rain followed the event. The tornado was reported from eyewitness reports.
Missouri
F2	N of Granger	Scotland, Clark	2020	8 miles (12.8 km)	A tornado destroyed several homes, businesses, barns, and outbuildings. Three people were injured: two in a vehicle and a third in a home.
California
F0	WSW of Fresno	Fresno	2115	1 miles (1.61 km)	Reports from county sheriff and spotters noted a tornado was on the ground just near the Fresno Air Terminal. The tornado broke tree limbs, inflict structural damage to roofs, move a camper shell, and break windows. The tornado was captured on video and was visible from 14 miles away.
Illinois
F4	S of Niota	Hancock, Henderson, Warren	2118	50 miles (80 km)	This tornado severely damaged a school and destroyed several farm buildings, including homes, as well as mobile homes. The tornado leveled farmhouses, one of which was swept from its foundation, and hundreds of hogs were killed. A car and a heating fuel tank were moved short distances as well.
F2	NE of St. Augustine to NE of Maquon	Knox	2218	14 miles (22.4 km)	This long-lived tornado damaged or destroyed 18 homes, 12 "farm structures" and 14 pieces of farm equipment. It also ruined 1,200 trees on a 10-acre (4.0 ha) orchard.
F4	W of Lewistown	Fulton	2255	7 miles (11.2 km)	A short-tracked but intense tornado destroyed 12 homes and killed several livestock. A car was hurled more than 100 yards (91 m) into a field, and 45 people were injured.
F3	N of Goofy Ridge to Tremont	Mason, Tazewell	2315	25 miles (40 km)	A tornado downed many trees, particularly in the Sand Ridge State Forest, and damaged or destroyed 61 homes and mobile homes.
F1	Princeville area	Peoria	2315	7 miles (11.2 km)	Four homes and several outbuildings were heavily damaged destroyed. A country club also lost its roof.
F0	NW of West Hallock	Peoria	2344	0.1 miles (0.16 km)	
F0	NW of Congerville	Woodford	0010	0.1 miles (0.16 km)	One home and five outbuildings were damaged and the roof of a mobile home was blown off.
F0	SW of Carlock	McLean	0015	0.1 miles (0.16 km)	Two homes and three outbuildings were damaged.
F1	Sabina area	McLean	0215	4 miles (6.4 km)	One home was destroyed and 14 others damaged. Several grain bins and outbuildings were also destroyed.
F0	NW of Papineau	Iroquois	0225	1 miles (1.6 km)	Some barns were damaged and the siding of a home was also damaged.
Arkansas
F0	NE of Cherokee City	Benton	0058	0.1 miles (0.16 km)	
F0	Rogers area	Benton	0146	0.1 miles (0.16 km)	
F0	S of Wesley	Madison	0357	0.1 miles (0.16 km)	
Indiana
F1	NE of Leases Corner	Cass	0313	2.8 miles (4.5 km)	One home and a mobile home were destroyed while four other homes were damaged.
F1	NW of Mexico	Miami	0324	1.5 miles (2.4 km)	20 homes were damaged, two mobiles were destroyed, and the roof and steeple of a church were also damaged.
F2	N of North Union to NW of New Brunswick	Montgomery, Boone	0358	14 miles (22.4 km)	3 deaths – This tornado destroyed 17 homes and two businesses. A high school, two businesses and 36 other homes were damaged. Fatalities occurred in rural prefabricated homes.
F0	SW of Sharpsville	Tipton	0425	0.1 miles (0.16 km)	Damage occurred to trees and power lines.
F2	Indianapolis area	Marion	0447	6.5 miles (10.4 km)	This tornado damaged 30 homes, a school and five businesses in the Nora section of Indianapolis.
Kentucky
F2	S of Fredonia	Crittenden, Caldwell	0515	8 miles (12.8 km)	This tornado destroyed farm buildings, including barns. It also turned a garage sideways, and one house lost its roof. A storage tank was blown away and grain bins were moved. Several small pieces of farm equipment were destroyed.
F2	NE of Lebanon Junction	Hardin, Bullitt	0535	15 miles (24 km)	One roof was damaged and trees were snapped. Rating disputed, ranked F1 by Grazulis.
F1	W of Fort Knox	Hardin	0548	0.5 miles (0.8 km)	Weak tornado with unknown damage.
F1	NE of Cecilia	Hardin	0625	0.5 miles (0.8 km)	Brief tornado with unknown damage.
F0	NW of Bondville	Mercer	0655	0.5 miles (0.8 km)	Brief tornado with no damage.
F0	Frankfort area	Franklin	0700	0.5 miles (0.8 km)	Weak tornado with no damage.
Source: Tornado History Project - Storm Data for May 13, 1995

=== May 14 event ===
List of confirmed tornadoes - May 14, 1995
F#	Location	County	Time (UTC)	Path length	Damage
Tennessee
F0	SW of Cookeville	Putnam	0955	0.5 miles (0.8 km)	Damage to a couple of storage buildings and a porch.
Texas
F0	W of Water Valley	Tom Green	2338	0.2 miles (0.32 km)	
F0	S of Lowake	Concho	0033	0.2 miles (0.32 km)	
F3	Mereta area	Tom Green	0044	5 miles (8 km)	A brief tornado destroyed 11 homes and significantly damaged other structures, including about 75 utility poles that were downed.
F1	S of Vancourt	Tom Green	0110	0.5 miles (0.8 km)	
F1	SW of Veribest	Tom Green	0114	0.4 miles (0.6 km)	
F0	E of Eola	Concho	0122	0.2 miles (0.32 km)	
Kentucky
F1	S of Donansburg	Green	0315	1 miles (1.6 km)	Several homes lost their roofs.
Source: Tornado History Project - Storm Data for May 14, 1995

=== May 15 event ===
List of confirmed tornadoes - May 15, 1995
F#	Location	County	Time (UTC)	Path length	Damage
Tennessee
F0	Memphis area	Shelby	1545	0.5 miles (0.8 km)	Caused damage to trees and a light pole.
Mississippi
F0	NE of Hickory Flat	Benton	1605	0.2 miles (0.32 km)	Several homes were damaged.
South Carolina
F0	NE of Kinards	Newberry	1953	0.1 miles (0.16 km)	
F0	S of Eadytown	Berkeley	2200	0.2 miles (0.32 km)	A mobile home was blown off of its foundation.
Colorado
F0	SE of Sheridan Lake	Kiowa	2345	1 miles (1.6 km)	Weak tornado with no damage.
Georgia
F1	SE of Garretta	Laurens	2238	1 miles (1.6 km)	A mobile home was knocked off its foundation.
Texas
F1	W of Magwalt	Winkler	2339	0.8 miles (1.3 km)	
F0	SE of Flomot	Motley	0020	0.1 miles (0.16 km)	
F0	SW of Judkins	Crane	0152	0.2 miles (0.32 km)	
Kansas
F0	SW of Tribune	Greeley	0024	0.1 miles (0.16 km)	Weak tornado with no damage.
F0	S of Tribune	Greeley	0035	0.1 miles (0.16 km)	Weak tornado with no damage.
F0	NE of Kendall	Kearny	0108	0.2 miles (0.32 km)	A pivot sprinkler and a mobile home were destroyed.
F1	S of Deerfield	Kearny	0130	1 miles (1.6 km)	A pivot sprinkler and a mobile home were destroyed.
F2	E of Garden City	Gray	0315	3 miles (4.8 km)	A tornado removed a roof from a house and blew a silo into a machine shed while downing trees and power lines.
F3	NE of Pierceville	Gray	0320	6 miles (9.6 km)	This tornado destroyed a modular home, injuring three people, while damaging barns, pivot sprinklers, fences, and sheds.
Source: Tornado History Project - Storm Data for May 15, 1995

=== May 16 event ===
List of confirmed tornadoes - May 16, 1995
F#	Location	County	Time (UTC)	Path length	Damage
Nebraska
F0	E of Daykin	Jefferson	2140	2 miles (3.2 km)	Caused damage to a center pivot and trees.
F0	W of Beatrice	Gage	2225	0.1 miles (0.16 km)	A truck was thrown into a ditch.
F0	Wymore area	Gage	2230	0.1 miles (0.16 km)	
Kansas
F3	W of Garden City, Kansas	Finney	2316	10 miles (16 km)	This tornado damaged two golf courses, roofs, power lines and a semi-trailer that was overturned. The tornado was rated F3 based on its appearance when filmed. Rating disputed, ranked F1 by Grazulis.
F0	NW of Pierceville	Finney, Gray	2340	2 miles (3.2 km)	Weak tornado with no damage.
F0	E of Garden City	Finney, Gray	2350	1 miles (1.6 km)	Weak tornado with no damage.
F0	E of Kalvesta	Hodgeman	0049	2 miles (3.2 km)	
F0	W of Jetmore	Hodgeman	0050	0.1 miles (0.16 km)	
F0	N of Jetmore	Hodgeman	0112	1.5 miles (2.4 km)	
F0	SW of Wilmington	Wabaunsee	0115	0.5 miles (0.8 km)	Some buildings, a barn and crops were damaged
F2	SW of Hanston	Hodgeman	0139	2.5 miles (4 km)	This tornado was rated F2 based on mobile Doppler weather radar data but only produced F1 damage.
F3	SE of Gray	Hodgeman, Pawnee	0146	7 miles (11.2 km)	This tornado was rated F3 based on mobile Doppler data but only produced F1 damage.
F0	NE of Gray	Hodgeman, Pawnee	0157	0.1 miles (0.16 km)	
F1	S of Baldwin City	Douglas	0230	10 miles (16 km)	Farm equipment, farm buildings and a motor-home were destroyed.
F1	SW of Edgerton	Johnson	0250	1 miles (1.6 km)	Some outbuildings had minor structural damage and several utility poles were snapped.
F0	SE of Edson	Sherman	0340	0.2 miles (0.32 km)	Weak tornado with no damage was filmed by police.
F0	N of Selkirk	Greeley	0345	0.1 miles (0.16 km)	Weak tornado with no damage.
F0	NE of Horace	Greeley	0431	0.1 miles (0.16 km)	Weak tornado with no damage.
F1	N of Beagle	Miami	0545	8 miles (12.8 km)	A mobile home was destroyed and another was overturned, resulting in five injuries. Trees were damaged as well.
F0	E of Friend	Finney	0620	2 miles (3.2 km)	
Colorado
F1	SW of Kit Carson	Cheyenne	0150	0.2 miles (0.32 km)	A gas tank was turned over and a portions of a roof were blown off.
F0	S of McClave	Bent	0358	1 miles (1.6 km)	Weak tornado with no damage.
Missouri
F1	N of Lacyville	Bates	0610	5 miles (8 km)	Damage to trees, utility poles and signs.
Texas
F1	NE of Lazbuddie	Parmer	0655	0.3 miles (0.5 km)	
Source: Tornado History Project - Storm Data for May 16, 1995

=== May 17 event ===
List of confirmed tornadoes - May 17, 1995
F#	Location	County	Time (UTC)	Path length	Damage
Kansas
F0	W of Silver Lake	Shawnee	0821	0.5 miles (0.8 km)	Several buildings, a storage tank, and a shed were damaged.
Missouri
F3	SE of Deerfield to NW of Dederick	Vernon	1434	14 miles (22.4 km)	This tornado destroyed six homes and heavily damaged various other structures, including outbuildings and brick buildings. An anemometer recorded a peak gust of 107 miles per hour (172 km/h).
F0	NE of Fristoe	Benton	1545	0.5 miles (0.8 km)	Weak tornado with no damage.
Texas
F0	SE of Huntoon	Ochiltree	1905	3 miles (4.8 km)	Weak tornado with no damage.
Oklahoma
F0	SE of Beaver	Beaver	2016	2 miles (3.2 km)	
F2	SW of McWillie	Woods, Alfalfa	2152	12 miles (19.2 km)	This multiple-vortex tornado destroyed four homes that lost their roofs and downed trees and power lines.
Source: Tornado History Project - Storm Data for May 17, 1995

=== May 18 event ===
List of confirmed tornadoes - May 18, 1995
F#	Location	County	Time (UTC)	Path length	Damage
Texas
F0	E of Wheelock	Brazos	0830	1 miles (1.6 km)	A barn was destroyed and a 60-foot (18 m) tower was downed.
F0	NE of Huffman	Liberty	1300	1 miles (1.6 km)	
F0	W of Dayton	Liberty	1308	1 miles (1.6 km)	
F1	NE of Liberty	Liberty	1320	6.5 miles (10.4 km)	This tornado injured 12 people.
F0	SW of Daisetta	Liberty	1340	0.2 miles (0.32 km)	
Kentucky
F2	NW of Bohon	Mercer	1035	1 miles (1.6 km)	This tornado destroyed three houses and damaged five others. Barns were blown down as well.
F2	NW of Bondville	Mercer, Woodford	1035	1 miles (1.6 km)	This tornado destroyed homes and flipped cars "upside down."
F2	W of Morehead	Rowan	1145	2 miles (3.2 km)	This tornado was rated F2 based mainly on tree damage. Rating disputed, ranked F1 by Grazulis.
F1	NE of Ovil	Todd	2100	0.5 miles (0.8 km)	A barn and several small buildings were destroyed.
F1	S of Cadiz	Trigg	2112	0.5 miles (0.8 km)	Damage was limited to trees.
F2	W of Hopkinsville	Trigg, Christian	2115	10 miles (16 km)	This tornado damaged or destroyed six homes, two barns, and many mobile homes. One mobile home was moved 300 ft (91 m).
F2	NE of Hardinsburg	Breckinridge	2140	1 miles (1.6 km)	This tornado damaged the roofs of some homes and businesses. Rating disputed, ranked F1 by Grazulis.
F0	E of Edmonton	Metcalfe	2204	1 miles (1.6 km)	Weak tornado with no damage.
F2	NE of Edmonton	Metcalfe	2210	3 miles (4.8 km)	This tornado destroyed a mobile home and three barns, while damaging several homes and a factory.
F2	Radcliff area	Hardin	2215	0.5 miles (0.8 km)	A tornado caused damage to several buildings. Rating disputed, ranked F1 by Grazulis.
F2	NW of Bowling Green	Warren	2225	2.5 miles (4 km)	A tornado damaged or destroyed several homes and businesses.
F2	Bowling Green area	Warren	2230	1.5 miles (2.4 km)	An "intermittent" tornado damaged or destroyed numerous homes and businesses on the north side of Bowling Green.
F1	Shepherdsville	Bullitt	2230	2 miles (3.2 km)	Damage to barns, buildings and mobile homes.
F2	N of Polkville	Warren	2247	5 miles (8 km)	A tornado damaged or destroyed several homes and businesses.
F1	W of Barnesburg	Pulaski	2300	0.5 miles (0.8 km)	A mobile home was damaged.
F2	E of East Bernstadt	Laurel	2310	3 miles (4.8 km)	A tornado destroyed a furniture business and damaged several other buildings. Trees were downed as well.
F0	NE of Manchester	Clay	2310	0.1 miles (0.16 km)	
F0	S of Wilstacy	Breathitt	2325	0.1 miles (0.16 km)	
F2	E of Atro to NE of Lebum	Perry, Knott	2330	24 miles (38.4 km)	This tornado destroyed rural buildings as it crossed rugged terrain.
Missouri
F1	SE of Hanna	Pulaski	1525	1 miles (1.6 km)	A building at a gravel company was damaged, as were two barns. A trailer was also overturned.
F2	Festus area	Jefferson, Ste. Genevieve	1705	7.2 miles (11.5 km)	This tornado damaged four homes and did minor roof damage to apartments. Trees and power lines were downed as well, and sheds were damaged.
F1	SW of Cape Girardeau	Cape Girardeau	1829	8 miles (14.4 km)	Outbuildings and barns were destroyed.
Tennessee
F1	NE of White Bluff	Dickson	1658	1 miles (1.6 km)	One home was destroyed by falling trees, and nine others were damaged.
F2	Goodlettsville to Gallatin	Davidson, Sumner	1730	15 miles (24 km)	This tornado destroyed 35 apartments and three mobile homes. Several businesses were also damaged. The Gallatin Civic Center suffered extensive damage to its swimming pool, and a school in Westmoreland had significant roof damage. 500 cars were damaged at an auto dealership.
F1	NW of Green Grove	Macon	1815	1 miles (1.6 km)	Two barn were blown down and several homes were damaged. 80 tombstones were blown over.
F2	SE of Cates to NE of Brownsville, KY	Lake, Obion, Fulton (KY)	1855	24 miles (38.4 km)	This tornado destroyed a barn and six grain silos, while some homes sustained damage to roofs, windows, and sidings. Crops were also damaged and two horses were killed. Damage to trees and a few roofs occurred in Kentucky.
F0	SE of Warren	Fayette	1855	1 miles (1.6 km)	A few trees were damaged.
F0	SW of Montezuma	Hardeman, Chester	1855	8 miles (12.8 km)	Weak tornado with no damage.
F0	Lexington area	Henderson	1955	0.5 miles (0.8 km)	A few trees were damaged.
F0	SE of Waynesboro	Wayne	2130	0.5 miles (0.8 km)	A few trees were damaged.
F4	SE of St. Joseph to Ethridge to NE of Liberty Hill	Lawrence, Giles	2152	29 miles (46.4 km)	3 deaths – This intense tornado destroyed 34 houses, 16 mobile homes and a business, especially in the Amish town of Ethridge. 98 homes, three mobile homes and two buildings were damaged. The tornado destroyed six Tennessee Valley Authority transmission towers, three of which reportedly vanished. Corn stalks were pulled out from the ground as well.
F0	N of Eagleville	Rutherford	2155	8 miles (14.4 km)	Five homes and a business were damaged.
F0	N of Green Hill	DeKalb, Warren	2230	2 miles (3.2 km)	Damage was limited to trees.
F0	Liberty Hill area	Giles	2247	3 miles (4.8 km)	40 buildings were damaged.
F0	SW of Oak Plains	Cheatham	2250	0.5 miles (0.8 km)	Damage was limited to trees.
F1	E of Millersville	Sumner	2252	3 miles (4.8 km)	Damage was limited to trees.
F1	Shelbyville to W of Hillcrest	Bedford, Coffee	2300	16 miles (25.6 km)	A fire hall and a mobile home were destroyed. Four barns, a supermarket, a few homes and several businesses were damaged. One horse was killed.
F0	NW of Coopertown	Robertson	2315	0.5 miles (0.8 km)	A few trees were damaged.
F3	Crossville area	Cumberland	2321	9 miles (14.4 km)	This tornado destroyed 11 homes, two businesses and 14 mobile homes while damaging several other homes.
F0	N of Manchester	Coffee	2330	1 miles (1.6 km)	A house trailer was overturned
F0	Coalfield area	Morgan	2350	0.5 miles (0.8 km)	Damage to trees and power lines.
F0	SE of Spencer	Van Buren	0045	0.1 miles (0.16 km)	Damage to power lines.
F1	NE of Crossville	Cumberland	0130	2 miles (3.2 km)	30 homes and house trailers were damaged.
F1	Knoxville area	Knox	0200	2 miles (3.2 km)	A dozen homes were damaged.
F0	NE of Antioch	Loudon	0300	1 miles (1.6 km)	A houseboat was torn loose from a boat dock.
Illinois
F1	Waterloo area	Monroe	1737	0.6 miles (1 km)	A business sustained roof damage and several homes were also damaged.
F2	SW of Wartburg	Monroe	1740	4 miles (6.4 km)	This tornado heavily damaged the upper story of a brick home and "flattened" farm buildings.
F1	E of Wartburg	Monroe	1742	4.5 miles (7.2 km)	Two homes had damage, farm buildings were blown down and two grain bins were toppled.
F0	SE of Waterloo	Monroe	1744	6 miles (9.6 km)	20 homes and businesses and two barns were damaged. Two farms also sustained damage including to grain bins, barns and house roofs.
F2	E of Burksville	Monroe	1746	4.2 miles (6.7 km)	This tornado produced minor roof damage to five homes. Garages and utility buildings lost roofs and walls as well. The tornado also heavily damaged a store and a storage building. Rating disputed, ranked F1 by Grazulis.
F0	S of Roachtown	St. Clair	1746	0.4 miles (0.6 km)	An outbuilding was damaged.
F1	SW of Hecker	Monroe	1748	4.8 miles (7.7 km)	Five houses and two barns were damaged.
F0	Darmstadt area	St. Clair, Washington	1805	8 miles (12.8 km)	
F0	E of Tilden	Randolph, Washington	1815	6 miles (9.6 km)	
F0	SE of Tilden	Randolph	1817	3.5 miles (5.6 km)	
F0	E of Plum Hill	Washington	1826	7.5 miles (0.16 km)	
F1	S of Addieville to S of Hoyleton	Washington	1828	18 miles (28.8 km)	Several homes, two utility buildings, a grain silo and farm buildings were damaged while a radio tower was destroyed.
F0	SE of Williamsburg	Jefferson	1850	0.3 miles (0.5 km)	Weak tornado with no damage.
F1	SW of Patton	Wabash	2025	0.5 miles (0.8 km)	Three homes were damaged.
District of Columbia
F0	Washington	District of Columbia	1722	0.5 miles (0.8 km)	Trees were downed at the National Arboretum.
Maryland
F1	Seat Pleasant area	Prince George's	1830	0.3 miles (0.5 km)	Three businesses and two homes were damaged.
F2	S of Denton	Talbot, Caroline	1930	10 miles (16 km)	Two homes, a barn and two chickens houses were destroyed while at least 10 other structures were damaged. 40 000 chickens/birds were killed and hundreds of trees were toppled.
Louisiana
F1	E of Carson	Beauregard	1935	0.3 miles (0.5 km)	Several homes sustained roof damage.
F1	Oakdale area	Allen	2030	0.5 miles (0.8 km)	A hospital sustained minor damaged and a nurse was injured.
F1	NE of Beaver	Evangeline	2030	0.5 miles (0.8 km)	A few homes were damaged.
F1	Baker area	East Baton Rouge	0000	0.3 miles (0.5 km)	One home sustained roof damage.
F1	SE of Daspit	Iberia	0217	0.5 miles (0.8 km)	A home and a mobile home were damaged.
Indiana
F1	SW of Shoals	Martin	2100	0.1 miles (0.16 km)	Damage to trees and power lines.
Mississippi
F0	E of Booneville	Prentiss	2140	1 miles (1.6 km)	Several homes were damaged.
F1	N of Ratliff	Lee, Itawamba	2244	2 miles (3.2 km)	Outbuildings were destroyed and signs were blown down.
F0	NE of Increase	Lauderdale	0223	0.5 miles (0.8 km)	Weak tornado with no damage.
F1	NE of Derby	Pearl River	0610	0.3 miles (0.5 km)	A mobile home was damaged.
Alabama
F1	E of Muscle Shoals	Colbert	1605	6.5 miles (10.4 km)	Five houses and three mobile homes were damaged.
F4	NW of Athens to N of Hollytree	Limestone, Madison, Jackson	2233	39 miles (62.4 km)	1 death – See article on this tornado
F1	E of Green Hill	Lauderdale	0003	1.5 miles (2.4 km)	10 homes were destroyed and several barns were destroyed.
Source: Tornado History Project - Storm Data for May 18, 1995

=== May 19 event ===
List of confirmed tornadoes - May 19, 1995
F#	Location	County	Time (UTC)	Path length	Damage
North Carolina
F1	S of Raeford	Hoke	1238	6 miles (9.6 km)	Caused damage to trees and mobile homes.
Source: Tornado History Project - Storm Data for May 19, 1995

=== May 21 event ===
List of confirmed tornadoes - May 21, 1995
F#	Location	County	Time (UTC)	Path length	Damage
Nebraska
F2	ESE Madrid	Perkins	1633	5 miles (8 km)	A tornado touched down just to the northeast of Madrid and moved to the southeast at 15 miles an hour. The tornado was on the ground for approximately 15 minutes and caused damage to six pivot irrigation systems. A dozen light poles were taken out leaving Elsie without power for 12 hours. A barn, granaries, and other buildings were also severely damaged.
F0	S Elsie	Perkins	1730	0.5 mile (0.8 km)	A small tornado that touched down for 2–4 minutes in open country.
South Dakota
F0	N of Gettysburg	Potter	1955	0.1 mile (0.16 km)	
F0	S of Mina Lake	Edmunds	2030	0.1 mile (0.16 km)	
Source: Tornado History Project - Storm Data for May 21, 1995

=== May 22 event ===
List of confirmed tornadoes - May 22, 1995
F#	Location	County	Time (UTC)	Path length	Damage
Kansas
F0	1S Pratt	Pratt	15:53 CDT	1 mile (1.6 km)	Hail the size of cantaloupes was reported. Unspecified damage was done.
F0	Trego Center	Trego	16:03:00 CDT	0.5 Mile (0.8 km)	
F0	SE of Burdett	Pawnee	16:10:00 CDT	0.2 mile (0.32 km)	
F0	Hanston	Hodgeman	16:15:00 CDT	0.2 mile (0.32 km)	
F0	W of Pretty Prairie	Reno	16:55:00 CST	0.1 mile (0.16 km)	
F0	Arlington	Reno	16:55:00 CST	0.1 mile (0.16 km)	
F1	S Antonino	Ellis	17:10:00 CDT	1.5 Miles (2.4 km)	Damage was $1 million done to crops across the county.
F0	Hugoton	Stevens	17:59:00 CDT	0.2 mile (0.32 km)	
F0	S Hugoton	Stevens	18:01:00 CDT	0.5 mile (0.8 km)	
F0	S of Halstead	Harvey	18:05:00 CST	0.1 mile (0.16 km)	
F0	Bentley	Sedgwick	18:05:00 CST	0.1 mile (0.16 km)	
F0	Hugoton	Stevens	17:59:00 CDT	0.2 mile (0.32 km)	
F0	Iuka	Pratt	18:21:00 CDT	0.5 mile (0.8 km)	
F0	Hugoton	Stevens	18:25:00 CDT	0.5 mile (0.8 km)	
F2	Stevens County, Kansas	Stevens	18:50:00.	3.5 Miles (5.6 km)	Tornado heavily damaged two farms and destroyed five pivot irrigation sprinklers. Property Damage of 300K.
F0	WNW of Liberal	Seward	19:05:00	2.5 Miles (4 km)	No damage reported, but rated F1 based on observation.
F1	S St. John	Stafford	19:18:00.	1 Mile (1.6 km)	
Oklahoma
F0	S Texola	Beckham	20:11:00.0	0.1 Mile (0.16 km)	
Texas
F1	NE Stinnett	Hutchinson	15:14:00 CST	2 miles (3.2 miles)	
F0	NNW of White Deer	Carson	15:15:00 CST	0.5 mile (0.8 km)	
F0	W Wheeler	Wheeler	18:18:00 CST	1 mile (1.6 km)	
F0	NE Lela	Wheeler	19:35:00 CST	0.3 mile (0.48 km)	
F0	E Shamrock	Wheeler	20:01:00 CST	1 mile (1.6 km)	
Source: Tornado History Project - Storm Data for May 22, 1995

=== May 23 event ===
List of confirmed tornadoes - May 23, 1995
F#	Location	County	Time (UTC)	Path length	Damage
Texas
F0	NE of Aspermont, TX	Stonewall	15:54:00	0.1 mile (0.16 km)	
F1	Del Rio, TX	Val Verde	21:06:00	0.1 mile (0.16 km)	A severe thunderstorm produced heavy rain, followed by damaging wind and finally a tornado as it moved into the Del Rio area. Winds damaged a houseboat and small outbuildings at Lake Amistad as the storm approached the city. Damage was reported to trees as it entered the western edge of the city. As much as three to five inches of rain, in less than a half-hour, produced widespread flooding along San Gabriel Creek, causing damages to homes and buildings. Nearly two dozen motorists were stranded in their vehicles in high water and had to be rescued. Widespread power outages were reported across Del Rio.
Source: Tornado History Project - Storm Data for May 23, 1995

=== May 27 event ===
List of confirmed tornadoes - May 27, 1995
F#	Location	County	Time (UTC)	Path length	Damage
Iowa
F4	SW of Des Moines, IA	Union, Adair, Guthrie, Dallas	18:55:00	55 miles	This tornado caused damage to rural areas and twenty houses. Several farm buildings were destroyed, including a dairy barn, grain bins and a chicken house. Two people were injured and power shortages were reported due to the powerlines collapsing. The tornado was filmed in Stuart by Jack Lawson.
Source: Tornado History Project - Storm Data for May 27, 1995

== See also ==
- List of North American tornadoes and tornado outbreaks
- Tornado History Project - May 1995
