= National Register of Historic Places listings in Concho County, Texas =

Location of Concho County in Texas

This is a list of the National Register of Historic Places listings in Concho County, Texas.

This is intended to be a complete list of properties listed on the National Register of Historic Places in Concho County, Texas. There are four properties listed on the National Register in the county. One property is both a State Antiquities Landmark and a Recorded Texas Historic Landmark.

This National Park Service list is complete through NPS recent listings posted March 21, 2025.

== Current listings ==
The publicly disclosed locations of National Register properties may be seen in a mapping service provided.

| | Name on the Register | Image | Date listed | Location | City or town | Description |
|---|---|---|---|---|---|---|
| 1 | Bishop Site | Bishop Site | June 17, 1977 (#77001434) | Address restricted | Salt Gap | |
| 2 | Concho County Courthouse | Concho County Courthouse | November 7, 1977 (#77001433) | Public Sq. 31°30′30″N 99°55′11″W | Paint Rock | State Antiquities Landmark, Recorded Texas Historic Landmark |
| 3 | Eola School | Eola School | December 22, 2005 (#05001458) | 12119 FM 381; 31°24′08″N 100°05′19″W | Eola | |
| 4 | Paint Rock Indian Pictograph Site | Paint Rock Indian Pictograph Site | June 21, 1971 (#71000927) | Address restricted | Paint Rock | |

== See also ==
- National Register of Historic Places listings in Texas
- Recorded Texas Historic Landmarks in Concho County
