= Paint Rock High School =

Paint Rock School

Location
- 698 South Sims Avenue; Paint Rock, Texas 76866; United States; 31.503827°N 99.925044°W

Information
- Type: Public high school
- Superintendent: Ron Cline
- Principal: Allison Tonne
- Teaching staff: 23.31 (FTE)
- Grades: PreK-12
- Enrollment: 181 (2023-2024)
- Student to teacher ratio: 7.76
- Colors: Maroon and white
- Team name: Indians
- Website: Official Website

Paint Rock School is a public primary, intermediate and highschool located in Paint Rock, Texas (USA) and classified as a 1A school by the UIL. It is part of the Paint Rock Independent School District located in Concho County. In 2015, the school was rated "Met Standard" by the Texas Education Agency.

== Athletics ==
The Paint Rock Indians compete in the following sports:

- Basketball
- Cross Country
- Six Man Football
- Golf
- Tennis
- Track & Field
- Volleyball
