= Millersview, Texas =

- Unincorporated community
- Location within the state of Texas Millersview (the United States)
- Coordinates: 31°24′32″N 99°45′20″W
- Country: United States
- State: Texas
- County: Concho
- Elevation: 1,644 ft (501 m)
- Time zone: UTC-6 (Central (CST))
  - Summer (DST): UTC-5 (CDT)
- GNIS feature ID: 1374959

Millersview is an unincorporated community in Concho County, Texas, United States. According to the Handbook of Texas, the community had a population of 75 in 2000. The town is the only one in the United States named Millersview.

== History ==
The settlement was given the name Millersview in honor of Edward D. Miller, who co-founded the town with Henry Barr. The village had a post office that opened in 1903 and was operational until the early 1990s. Millersview was given credit for having a windmill and a Woodmen of the World lodge in 1908 by county advertising materials. By 1914, the town boasted three churches, three mercantile businesses, a grocer, a gin, and a grain, hay, and feed company, with a population of 160. By 1931, the population was estimated to be 300; however, by 1933, it had decreased to 100; by 1939, it had increased once again, to 250. After that, the population fell, partly as a result of the 1950s Texas drought. Millersview had the post office, four businesses, and five churches in 1963 when the population was estimated to be 175 people. A population of 75 was recorded between 1970 and 2000.

Although Millersview is unincorporated, it has a post office, with the ZIP code of 76862.

On May 7, 1995, an F0 tornado struck Millersview. Another F0 tornado struck the community on May 30, 2012. The tornado had a brief touchdown with no damage.

== Geography ==
Millersview is located at the intersection of Farm to Market Roads 2134 and 765 near the west fork of Mustang Creek, 12 mi (19 km) southeast of Paint Rock and 43 mi (69 km) east of San Angelo in Concho County.

== Education ==
The Mustang School, located on Mustang Creek, was the first school in the area. The Millersview school had 92 pupils and two instructors in the 1907–08 school year. Eight teachers taught elementary and high school classes at the institution in 1940. Following the 1957–1958 academic year, the high school was closed; in the next academic year, four teachers taught the elementary classes. In 1963, the school stayed open. Its school had closed by 1989, and students were studying in Eden. Today, the community is served by the Paint Rock Independent School District.
