= Eola Independent School District =

Defunct school district in Texas

Eola Independent School District (EISD) was a public school district based in the community of, Eola, Texas, in West Texas. It consolidated with the now-defunct Eden Independent School District to form the Eden Consolidated Independent School District.

== History ==
A $30,000 11-grade concrete school building was built on Eola after a bond passed.

Eola ISD consolidated into Eden ISD to form the Eden CISD in April 1983 in spite of the communities' 24 miles (39 km) distance. Eola ISD property was then sold off and the revenue was used to cover costs of transferring equipment to Eden. This caused overcrowding and resulted in the new district buying a new building using surplus cash.

The consolidation took effect on September 1, 1983.

Voters later approved consolidation with the bordering Eden Independent School District and the Eola schools were shut down.
