= Tornado outbreak sequence of May 6–27, 1995 =

Weather event in the United States

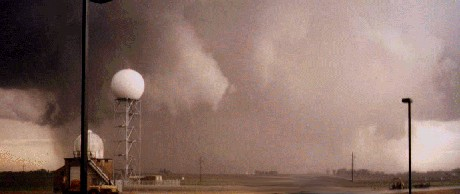
- An F3 tornado that occurred near Lincoln, Illinois on May 9.

Meteorological history
- Duration: May 6–27, 1995

Tornado outbreak
- Tornadoes: 279
- Max. rating: F4 tornado
- Duration: 3 weeks

Overall effects
- Fatalities: 13
- Injuries: >500
- Damage: >$135 million (1995 figures)
- Areas affected: Great Plains, Midwestern United States, Eastern United States

The tornado outbreak sequence of May 6–27, 1995 was a long-lasting tornado outbreak sequence that occurred in the United States during May 1995. Thirteen deaths occurred due to the outbreak. Nearly 300 tornadoes occurred during this period from the Central US through the Southeast and into the Mid-Atlantic. The main event days were May 6 – May 7, May 9, May 13, May 18, and May 27.

== May 13 tornadoes in the Midwest ==
Another tornado outbreak which the National Weather Service issued a high risk for occurred in Illinois, Indiana, and Kentucky. The tornadoes that occurred on this day resulted in three deaths all from the same tornado that moved through Montgomery and Boone Counties in Indiana just west of Indianapolis. A tornado also hit the eastern sections of the Indianapolis area causing damage to dozens of structures but no injuries. Several destructive tornadoes also touched down south and west of the Peoria, Illinois Metro Area including two F4s that resulted in 50 injuries.

== May 18 tornado outbreak ==
This was the tornado outbreak responsible for the Anderson Hills Tornado which killed one person. In southern Middle Tennessee, an F4 tornado in Lawrence County, Tennessee and Giles County, Tennessee struck the town of Ethridge and killed three people. The National Weather Service weather forecast office in Nashville, Tennessee said that May 18, 1995 was the 3rd worst tornado outbreak to hit middle Tennessee. Nearly 80 tornadoes touched down during that day. In addition to the two killer tornadoes, three tornadoes touched down in and around the Bowling Green, Kentucky area destroying numerous structures including inside the city limits. Other tornadoes struck the Knoxville and northeastern Nashville areas. Nearly 30 people were injured in Sumner County, Tennessee northeast of Nashville.

== Confirmed tornadoes ==
Confirmed tornadoes by Fujita rating
FU	F0	F1	F2	F3	F4	F5	Total
0	137	84	39	14	4	0	279

== See also ==
- List of North American tornadoes and tornado outbreaks
- Tornado outbreak of April 15–16, 1998
- Tornado outbreak sequence of March 9–13, 2006
