= Eden High School (Texas) =

Location
- 420 Kelly Street; Eden, Texas 76837-0988; United States; 31.22068°N 99.844377°W

Information
- School type: Public high school
- School district: Eden Consolidated Independent School District
- Principal: Tina Briley
- Grades: 7-12
- Enrollment: 219 (2023-2024)
- Colors: Royal Blue & White
- Athletics conference: UIL Class A
- Mascot: Bulldog
- Website: Eden CISD

Eden High School is a public high school located in Eden, Texas, United States. It is classified as a 1A school by the UIL and is part of the Eden Consolidated Independent School District, located in south central Concho County. In 2015, the school was rated "Met Standard" by the Texas Education Agency.

== Athletics ==
The Eden Bulldogs compete in these sports -

- Basketball
- Cross Country
- 6-Man Football
- Golf
- Tennis
- Track and Field
- Volleyball
