= Eola =

Eola may refer to:

- Eola, Illinois
- Eola, Oregon
  - Eola-Amity Hills AVA, Oregon wine region
- Eola, Texas, the most populous Eola in the US
- Lake Eola, Orlando, Florida
- Aeolian processes, the process of wind activity
- End of Life Announcement is a milestone in Product Life Cycle
