= Lowak =

Lowak may refer to:

- "Lowak" (Echo), an episode of Echo
- Lowak, a character from Echo

== See also ==
- Lowake, Texas
