= Liberty Hill, Giles County, Tennessee =

- Unincorporated community
- Location within Tennessee Location within the United States
- Coordinates: 35°19′50″N 87°11′26″W
- Country: United States
- State: Tennessee
- County: Giles
- Elevation: 1,060 ft (320 m)
- Time zone: UTC-6 (Central (CST))
  - Summer (DST): UTC-5 (CDT)
- Area code: 931
- GNIS feature ID: 1291153

Liberty Hill is an unincorporated community in Giles County, Tennessee. Liberty Hill is 6.4 miles (10.3 km) east of Ethridge.
