= Eden Consolidated Independent School District =

School district in Texas

Coordinates: 31.2218°N 99.8448°W

Eden Consolidated Independent School District is a public school district based in Eden, Texas (USA). The district is located in southern Concho County, including Eola, and extends into a small portion of northern Menard County.

== History ==
On September 1, 1983, Eola Independent School District merged into Eden CISD.

== Academic achievement ==
In 2009, the school district was rated "academically acceptable" by the Texas Education Agency.

== Schools ==
Eden Consolidated ISD has two campuses -

- Eden High School (Grades 7-12)
- Eden Elementary School (Grades K-6)

== Special programs ==
=== Athletics ===
Eden High School plays six-man football.

== See also ==
- List of school districts in Texas
