= Lowake, Texas =

- Unincorporated community
- Location within the state of Texas Lowake (the United States)
- Coordinates: 31°33′59″N 100°04′33″W
- Country: United States
- State: Texas
- County: Concho
- Elevation: 1,752 ft (534 m)
- Time zone: UTC-6 (Central (CST))
  - Summer (DST): UTC-5 (CDT)
- ZIP codes: 76855
- GNIS feature ID: 1361897

Lowake is an unincorporated community in northwestern Concho County, Texas, United States. According to the Handbook of Texas, the community had a population of 40 in 2000.

== History ==
When the Concho, San Saba, and Llano Valley rail line laid track from Miles to Paint Rock, creating Lowake at the halfway point, the community was founded as a speculative endeavor in 1909. Two farmers, Lowe and Schlake, who gave land for the townsite, are the community's namesakes. In 1909, Lowake was granted a post office. Ten people were reported to be living there in 1925, with 50 in 1927, and returning to 10 in 1933. The town featured multiple dispersed buildings, a seasonal industry, and another business in 1936. Lowake had 120 residents at its peak in 1961. Two years later, Lowake featured a community center, five establishments (one a well-known steakhouse that was known for miles), and a post office. Its population was 40 from 1970 through 2000.

Although Lowake is unincorporated, it has a post office, with the ZIP code of 76855.

On May 14, 1995, an F0 tornado struck Lowake. On May 18, 2019, an F3 tornado struck Lowake. In and around the community, this large and intense, multiple-vortices tornado destroyed numerous outbuildings and an RV camper and tossed a large metal storage tank. Farther along its path, a home lost its roof and exterior walls.

== Geography ==
Lowake is located at the intersection of Farm to Market Roads 381 and 1929 on the Concho River, 9 mi (14 km) northwest of Paint Rock in extreme northwestern Concho County.

== Education ==
Lowake had its own school in 1936 that taught first grade through high school juniors in 1940. It had 44 students enrolled and employed three instructors. In 1955, it joined the Paint Rock Independent School District.
