= 1995 Anderson Hills tornado =

1995 F4 tornado in Alabama

- The tornado at peak intensity in Huntsville, Alabama near Anderson Hills.

Meteorological history
- Formed: May 18, 1995, 5:33 p.m. CDT (UTC−05:00)
- Dissipated: May 18, 1995, 6:21 p.m. CDT (UTC−05:00)
- Duration: 48 minutes

F4 tornado
- on the Fujita scale
- Highest winds: 207–260 mph (333–418 km/h)

Overall effects
- Fatalities: 1
- Injuries: 55
- Damage: $5 million (1995 USD)
- Areas affected: Alabama
- Power outages: >19,500
- Part of the Tornado outbreak sequence of May 6-27, 1995 and Tornadoes of 1995

On Thursday May 18, 1995, a powerful and destructive F4 tornado struck several towns near the city of Huntsville, Alabama, killing one person and causing extensive damage and devastation, including the destruction of the Anderson Hills subdivision. The tornado touched down just northwest of Athens. It tracked from that point through eastern Limestone County, through Harvest, Meridianville, and New Market in northern Madison County, Alabama, and ended near Princeton in northwest Jackson County, Alabama. The strongest portion of the tornado's path was near Harvest in northwest Madison County around the Anderson Hills subdivision and the Huntsville Dragway, lending the tornado its name. The tornado resulted in US$5 million (1995) in property damage.

== Storm development and track ==
=== Touchdown ===
The tornado first touched down at 5:33 p.m. approximately three miles northwest of Athens, just east of SR 99. The tornado moved across SR 127, then across Interstate 65 near the interchange with US 31. From there, the tornado strengthened as it continued east, crossing SR 251, where it destroyed 13 mobile homes at the Oakdale Mobile Home Park. At this point of devastation at around 5:42 p.m., one person received major injuries from the tornado and died two days later; Chuck Dale, 30 years old, was the one fatality of the tornado. Around this time, a tornado warning was issued for Madison County to give residents on the northwest side of the county an opportunity to take cover; tornado sirens were activated at 5:43 p.m., one minute after the warning was issued. Meanwhile, the tornado began to move slightly north of east, moving across Mooresville Road and crossing through the Copeland community near the intersection of Copeland Road and East Limestone Road. It continued to strengthen as it crossed over Limestone Creek and approached the Madison County line. Overall in Limestone County, 35 buildings were damaged or destroyed, and 26 mobile homes were destroyed. Around 9,500 customers lost electricity in the county, where damage was estimated to be $1.5 million.

=== Madison County ===
The tornado crossed into Madison County around 5:50 p.m. on Love Branch Road, just north of the Yarbrough Road intersection. It continued an east-northeasterly path across Carroll Road, Old Railroad Bed Road, and Wall Triana Highway, crossing just south of Harvest Elementary School. At 5:52 p.m., Madison County Fire dispatch reported that the tornado was on the ground near Harvest. The now violent tornado moved directly into Harvest and crossed Fords Chapel Road before taking a direct hit on the Anderson Hills subdivision along SR 53. At this point, the tornado was at F4 intensity and the subsequent survey would also reveal evidence of it having multiple vortices. A total of 39 well-constructed houses in the subdivision sustained major damage, and 21 were destroyed. The Piggly Wiggly along SR 53 also received damage. At 5:54 p.m., the Madison County Sheriff's Department confirmed the tornado had crossed Old Railroad Bed Road and SR 53. As a result of these reports, tornado sirens were reactivated in Madison County one minute later. The tornado continued east-northeast making a glancing blow to the Huntsville Dragway before crossing Quarter Mountain Road and Bollweevil Lane on the northern face of Quarter Mountain. Next it crossed Hammond Lane (where it caused major damage to a few two story brick homes), Beaver Dam Road, Beaverdam Creek, and Pulaski Pike. It moved over Beaverdam Creek a second time at Mount Lebanon Road as it moved into the Meridianville area, then across Patterson Lane destroying one home and damaging several others. Shortly after 6:00 p.m., the tornado crossed US 231/431 at Steger Curve – around Brier Fork bridge. Here, substantial damage was done to a cotton gin and a large farm house was spun off its foundation.

=== More tornado warnings ===
From the highway, the tornado continued slightly north of east, tracking along Steger Road to near its intersection with McCollum Road. It moved across farmland, then crossed Moores Mill Road just south of Moores Mill School (now known as Lynn Fanning School). Several windows at the school were shattered. East of here, the tornado caused damage on the south end of the Timberwind subdivision before crossing the Flint River between Meridianville and New Market. At 6:13 p.m., a Madison County Sheriff's deputy radioed that the tornado was passing over his car on Butler Road. Also at this time, a tornado warning was issued for Jackson County. The tornado continued east of here causing structural damage along Arnold Road and Noles Drive before crossing Mountain Fork. It then moved across Sharon Johnson Park, causing mostly tree and minor structural damage. It then struck several homes in the Colony Square subdivision before crossing Winchester Road in New Market. At this point, the tornado path became more easterly as it moved into the more rugged terrain of northeastern Madison County. It reached the Jackson County border at 6:21 p.m. All told, over 10,000 Huntsville Utilities customers lost power during the storm.

=== Dissipation ===
The tornado weakened considerably as it moved across Putnam Mountain in northwest Jackson County, before ending near Princeton. The official survey indicated the tornado ended southeast of Princeton and east of SR 65. Damage that occurred in this area was mostly F0 damage.

== See also ==
- List of North American tornadoes and tornado outbreaks
- List of F4 and EF4 tornadoes
- 2011 Hackleburg–Phil Campbell tornado
