= Bondville, Kentucky =

Unincorporated community in Kentucky, United States

- Unincorporated community
- Location within Kentucky
- Coordinates: 37°55′18″N 84°52′19″W
- Country: United States
- State: Kentucky
- County: Mercer
- Elevation: 781 ft (238 m)
- Time zone: UTC-5 (Eastern (EST))
  - Summer (DST): UTC-4 (EDT)
- Area code: 859
- GNIS feature ID: 487657

Bondville is an unincorporated community in Mercer County, Kentucky, United States. Bondville is located on a railroad 11.1 miles (17.9 km) north of Harrodsburg.
