= Concho County Courthouse =

- U.S. National Register of Historic Places
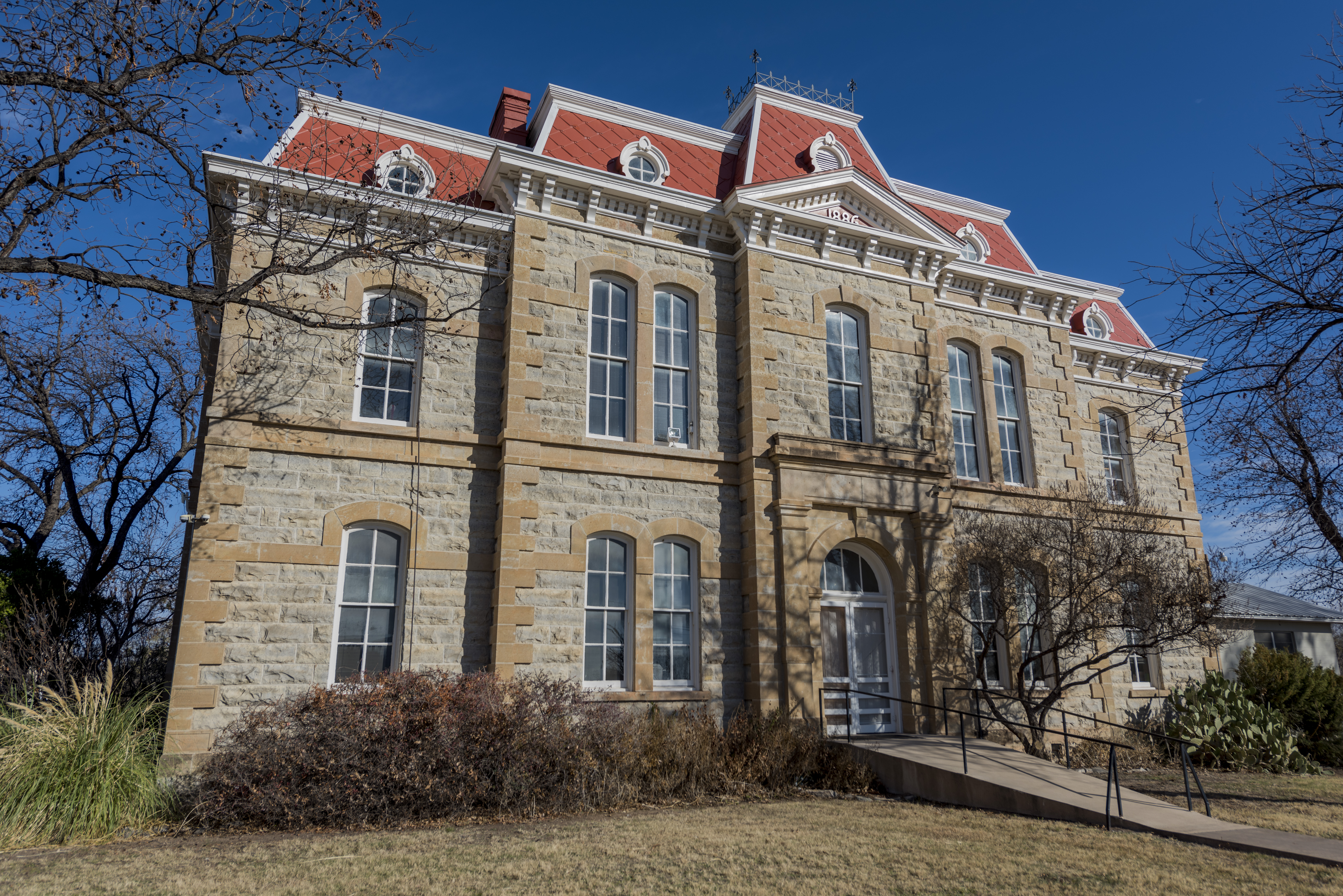
- 1886 Concho County courthouse in 2019

- Location within Texas Location within the United States
- Interactive map showing the location of Concho County Courthouse
- Location: Public Sq., Paint Rock, Texas
- Coordinates: 31°30′30″N 99°55′11″W
- Area: 3 acres (1.2 ha)
- Built: 1886
- Architect: F.E. Ruffini, Oscar Ruffini
- Architectural style: Second Empire
- NRHP reference No.: 77001433
- Added to NRHP: November 7, 1977

The Concho County Courthouse on Public Sq. in Paint Rock, Texas is a courthouse built in 1886. It was listed on the National Register of Historic Places in 1977.

It was designed in Second Empire style by architect F.E. Ruffini and was built under supervision of Oscar Ruffini.

It is a Texas State Antiquities Landmark and a Recorded Texas Historic Landmark.
