= Concho County, Texas =

County in Texas, United States

- County
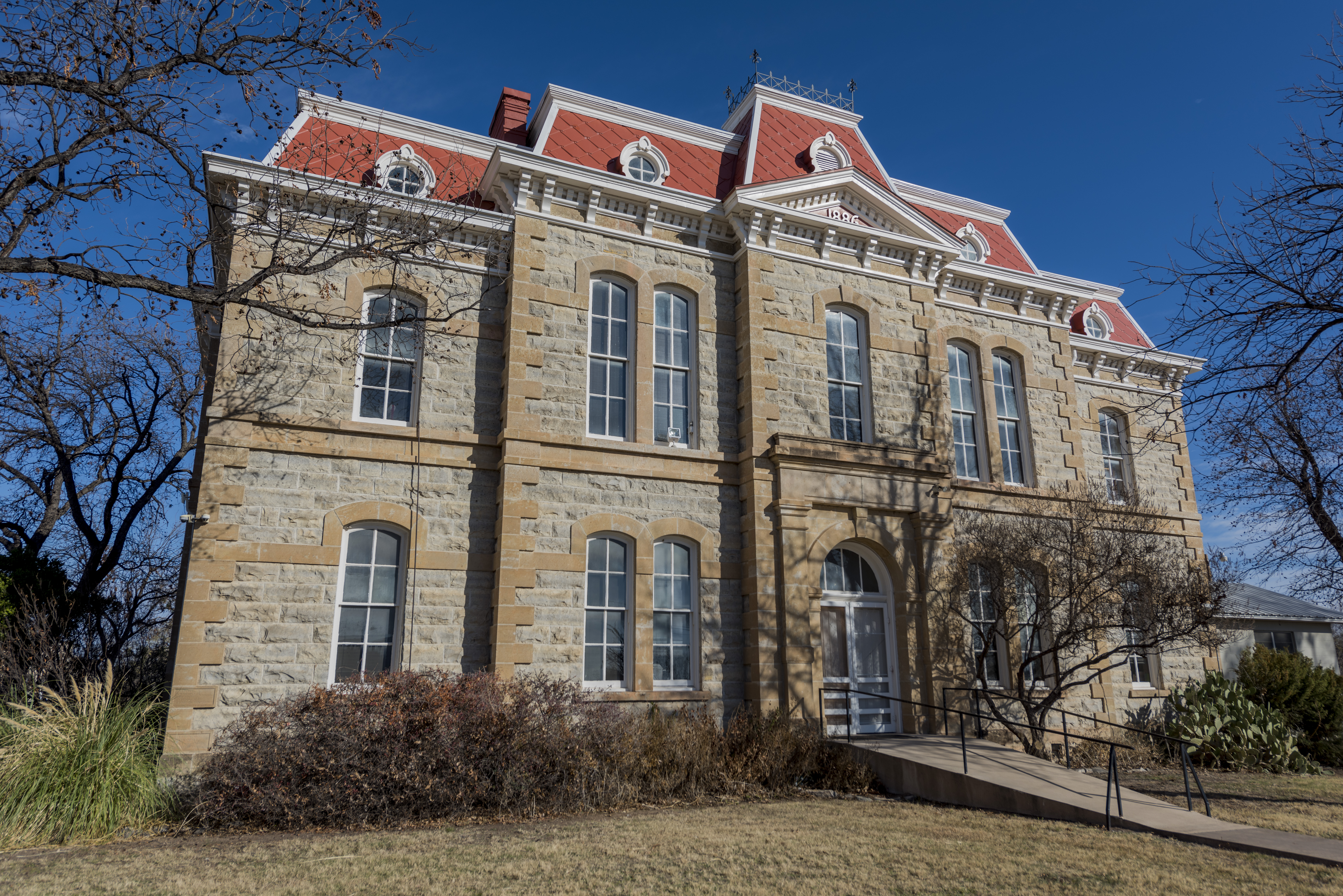
- The Concho County Courthouse in Paint Rock

- Location within the U.S. state of Texas
- Coordinates: 31°20′N 99°52′W
- Country: United States
- State: Texas
- Founded: 1879
- Named for: Concho River
- Seat: Paint Rock
- Largest city: Eden

Area
  - Total: 994 sq mi (2,570 km^{2})
  - Land: 984 sq mi (2,550 km^{2})
  - Water: 9.9 sq mi (26 km^{2}) 1.0%

Population (2020)
  - Total: 3,303
  - Estimate (2025): 3,607 ▲
  - Density: 3.36/sq mi (1.30/km^{2})
- Time zone: UTC−6 (Central)
  - Summer (DST): UTC−5 (CDT)
- Congressional district: 11th
- Website: www.co.concho.tx.us

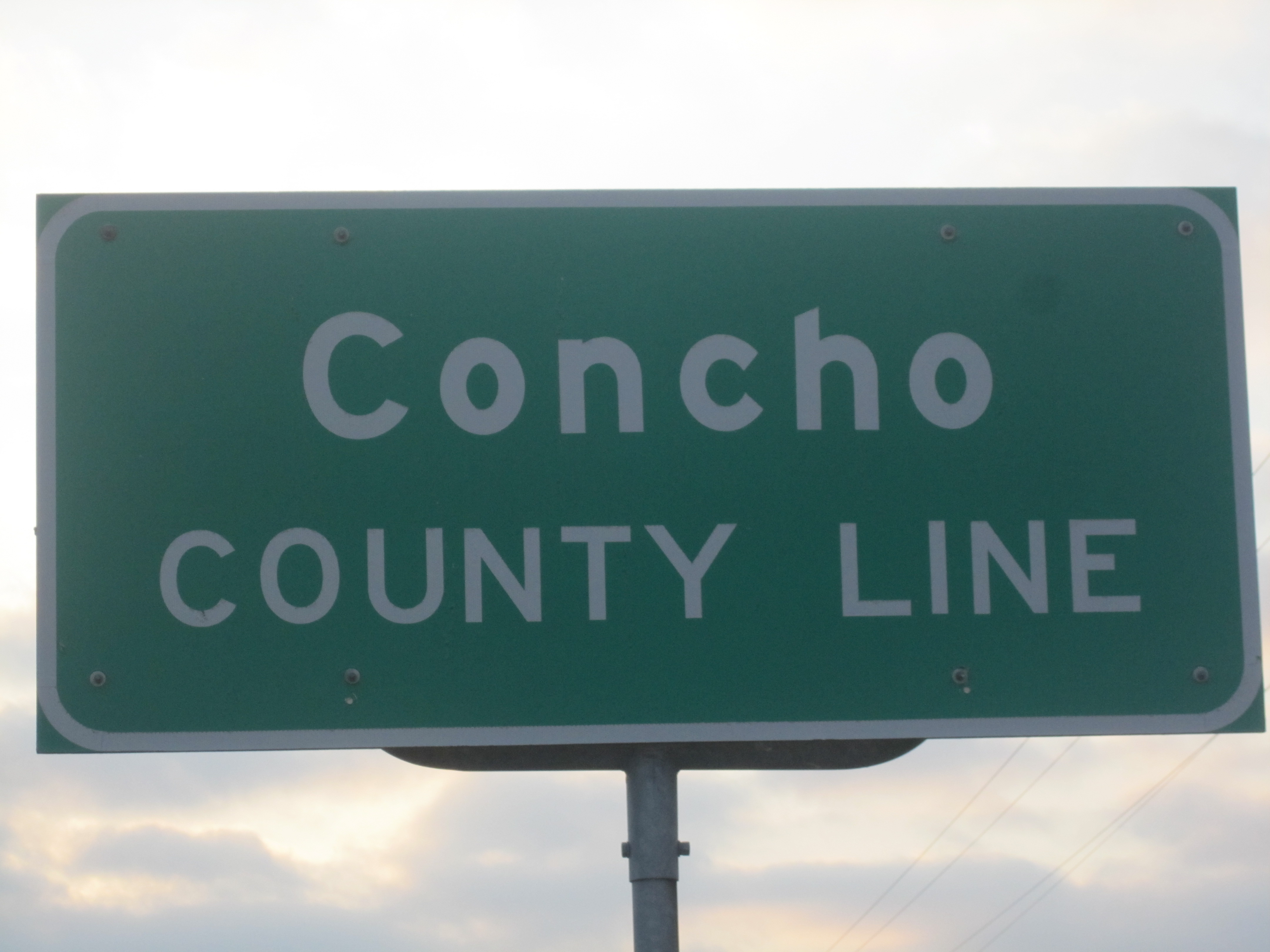
Concho County marker

Concho County is a county located on the Edwards Plateau in the U.S. state of Texas. At the 2020 census, the population was 3,303. Its county seat is Paint Rock. The county was founded in 1858 and later organized in 1879. It is named for the Concho River.

== History ==
In the 1800s, Paleo-Indians lived in the county and left behind archaeological remains of a burned-rock midden. Athabascan-speaking Indians associated with the pre-horse Plains culture live in this part of Texas. Later native inhabitants included Jumano, Tonkawa, Comanche and Lipan Apache.

In 1847, John O. Meusebach sent surveyors into the area. In 1849, Robert Simpson Neighbors led a small expedition through the area.

The Texas Legislature formed Concho County from Bexar County in 1858.

In 1874, Ranald S. Mackenzie led a campaign to drive out the remaining native peoples and established the Mackenzie Trail. The county seat was formally established and named Paint Rock after the nearby pictographs. The Eden community was established in 1882. In 1909, the community of Lowake was established.

=== Railroad development ===
Railroads came to the county first in 1910, with the Concho, San Saba and Llano Valley railroad being completed to Paint Rock. The Fort Worth and Rio Grande Railway was completed across the southeastern corner of the county in 1911, and the Gulf, Colorado and Santa Fe railroad finished a line to Eden in 1912.

By 1930, the area had 449 owner-operated farms and 682 tenant-operated farms, of whom 619 were sharecroppers.

In 1940, Concho County became part of a soil-conservation district. In 1985, the Texas Water Commission granted permission to impound 554,000 acre-feet (683,000,000 m^{3}) of water on the Colorado River at Stacy, to create the O. H. Ivie Reservoir.

In 1988, Concho County was the leading sheep-producing county in Texas.

== Geography ==
According to the U.S. Census Bureau, the county has a total area of 994 square miles (2,570 km^{2}), of which 984 square miles (2,550 km^{2}) is land and 9.9 square miles (26 km^{2}) (1.0%) is water.

=== Major highways ===
- U.S. Highway 83
- U.S. Highway 87
- Loop 577

=== Adjacent counties ===
- Runnels County (north)
- Coleman County (northeast)
- McCulloch County (east)
- Menard County (south)
- Schleicher County (southwest)
- Tom Green County (west)

== Demographics ==
Historical population
Census	Pop.	Note	%±
1880	800		—
1890	1,065		33.1%
1900	1,427		34.0%
1910	6,654		366.3%
1920	5,847		−12.1%
1930	7,645		30.8%
1940	6,192		−19.0%
1950	5,078		−18.0%
1960	3,672		−27.7%
1970	2,937		−20.0%
1980	2,915		−0.7%
1990	3,044		4.4%
2000	3,966		30.3%
2010	4,087		3.1%
2020	3,303		−19.2%
2025 (est.)	3,607	▲	9.2%
U.S. Decennial Census; 1850–2010 2010 2020

=== Racial and ethnic composition ===
Concho County, Texas – Racial and ethnic composition Note: the US Census treats Hispanic/Latino as an ethnic category. This table excludes Latinos from the racial categories and assigns them to a separate category. Hispanics/Latinos may be of any race.
Race / Ethnicity (NH = Non-Hispanic)	Pop 1980	Pop 1990	Pop 2000	Pop 2010	Pop 2020	% 1980	% 1990	% 2000	% 2010	% 2020
White alone (NH)	2,092	1,827	2,265	1,810	2,097	71.77%	60.02%	57.11%	44.29%	63.49%
Black or African American alone (NH)	0	14	38	57	69	0.00%	0.46%	0.96%	1.39%	2.09%
Native American or Alaska Native alone (NH)	3	4	4	13	9	0.10%	0.13%	0.10%	0.32%	0.27%
Asian alone (NH)	2	4	3	14	19	0.07%	0.13%	0.08%	0.34%	0.58%
Native Hawaiian or Pacific Islander alone (NH)	x	x	4	5	1	x	x	0.10%	0.12%	0.03%
Other race alone (NH)	12	1	0	2	16	0.41%	0.03%	0.00%	0.05%	0.48%
Mixed race or Multiracial (NH)	x	x	13	13	59	x	x	0.33%	0.32%	1.79%
Hispanic or Latino (any race)	806	1,194	1,639	2,173	1,033	27.65%	39.22%	41.33%	53.17%	31.27%
Total	2,915	3,044	3,966	4,087	3,303	100.00%	100.00%	100.00%	100.00%	100.00%

=== 2020 census ===
As of the 2020 census, the county had a population of 3,303 and a median age of 42.6 years. 13.7% of residents were under the age of 18 and 22.0% of residents were 65 years of age or older. For every 100 females there were 187.2 males, and for every 100 females age 18 and over there were 205.6 males age 18 and over.

The racial makeup of the county was 76.2% White, 2.5% Black or African American, 0.6% American Indian and Alaska Native, 0.7% Asian, <0.1% Native Hawaiian and Pacific Islander, 10.3% from some other race, and 9.7% from two or more races. Hispanic or Latino residents of any race comprised 31.3% of the population.

<0.1% of residents lived in urban areas, while 100.0% lived in rural areas.

There were 977 households in the county, of which 25.6% had children under the age of 18 living in them. Of all households, 53.0% were married-couple households, 20.8% were households with a male householder and no spouse or partner present, and 22.1% were households with a female householder and no spouse or partner present. About 26.9% of all households were made up of individuals and 14.9% had someone living alone who was 65 years of age or older.

There were 1,407 housing units, of which 30.6% were vacant. Among occupied housing units, 79.4% were owner-occupied and 20.6% were renter-occupied. The homeowner vacancy rate was 3.1% and the rental vacancy rate was 9.5%.

=== 2000 census ===
At the 2000 census, 3,966 people, 1,058 households and 757 families resided in the county. The population density was 4 per square mile (1.5/km^{2}). There were 1,488 housing units at an average density of 2 per square mile (0.77/km^{2}). The racial make-up of the county was 88.20% White, 0.98% Black or African American, 0.48% Native American, 0.08% Asian, 0.10% Pacific Islander, 8.93% from other races and 1.24% from two or more races. About 41.33% of the population were Hispanics or Latinos of any race.

Of the 1,058 households, 29.80% had children under the age of 18 living with them, 59.40% were married couples living together, 9.70% had a female householder with no husband present and 28.40% were not families. About 26.60% of all households were made up of individuals and 14.20% had someone living alone who was 65 years of age or older. The average household size was 2.45 and the average family size was 2.97.

16.10% of the population were under the age of 18, 10.40% from 18 to 24, 38.20% from 25 to 44, 21.50% from 45 to 64 and 13.80% were 65 years of age or older. The median age was 36 years. For every 100 females, there were 181.30 males. For every 100 females age 18 and over, there were 209.90 males.

The median household income was $31,313 and the median family income was $36,894. Males had a median income of $20,750 and females $21,458. The per capita income was $15,727. About 7.50% of families and 11.90% of the population were below the poverty line, including 15.80% of those under age 18 and 14.20% of those age 65 or over.

In 2004, Concho County has the third-highest proportion of prison inmates amongst its residents of any county equivalent in the United States, behind Crowley County, Colorado, and West Feliciana Parish, Louisiana. As a result, the county had the highest gender ratio in the United States with 232 men to every 100 women.

== Communities ==
=== City ===
- Eden

=== Town ===
- Paint Rock (county seat)

=== Unincorporated communities ===
- Eola
- Lowake
- Millersview
- Vick

=== Ghost towns ===
- Concho
- Henderson Chapel
- Lightner
- Live Oak
- Pasche

== In popular culture ==
The 1968 movie Journey to Shiloh features a group known as the "Concho County Comanches," and mentions neighboring Menard County.

== Politics ==
United States presidential election results for Concho County, Texas
Year	Republican		Democratic		Third party(ies)	
Year	No.	%	No.	%	No.	%
1912	16	4.28%	326	87.17%	32	8.56%
1916	36	7.07%	418	82.12%	55	10.81%
1920	151	22.37%	405	60.00%	119	17.63%
1924	90	11.52%	668	85.53%	23	2.94%
1928	446	50.97%	426	48.69%	3	0.34%
1932	44	3.75%	1,126	95.91%	4	0.34%
1936	76	6.52%	1,089	93.48%	0	0.00%
1940	189	12.60%	1,310	87.33%	1	0.07%
1944	151	11.07%	1,090	79.91%	123	9.02%
1948	174	12.93%	1,156	85.88%	16	1.19%
1952	808	53.30%	708	46.70%	0	0.00%
1956	574	50.26%	567	49.65%	1	0.09%
1960	522	42.03%	718	57.81%	2	0.16%
1964	307	24.44%	948	75.48%	1	0.08%
1968	411	37.03%	502	45.23%	197	17.75%
1972	709	66.95%	350	33.05%	0	0.00%
1976	474	39.67%	715	59.83%	6	0.50%
1980	700	49.40%	702	49.54%	15	1.06%
1984	821	58.31%	580	41.19%	7	0.50%
1988	617	48.85%	643	50.91%	3	0.24%
1992	414	33.50%	489	39.56%	333	26.94%
1996	488	47.29%	434	42.05%	110	10.66%
2000	818	74.16%	268	24.30%	17	1.54%
2004	911	76.36%	270	22.63%	12	1.01%
2008	807	74.93%	257	23.86%	13	1.21%
2012	793	79.22%	194	19.38%	14	1.40%
2016	885	82.87%	148	13.86%	35	3.28%
2020	1,058	83.44%	197	15.54%	13	1.03%
2024	1,038	86.64%	153	12.77%	7	0.58%

United States Senate election results for Concho County, Texas1
Year	Republican		Democratic		Third party(ies)	
Year	No.	%	No.	%	No.	%
2024	989	83.53%	176	14.86%	19	1.60%

United States Senate election results for Concho County, Texas2
Year	Republican		Democratic		Third party(ies)	
Year	No.	%	No.	%	No.	%
2020	1,029	82.52%	193	15.48%	25	2.00%

Texas Gubernatorial election results for Concho County
Year	Republican		Democratic		Third party(ies)	
Year	No.	%	No.	%	No.	%
2022	818	86.74%	109	11.56%	16	1.70%

== Education ==
School districts include:

- Brady Independent School District
- Eden Consolidated Independent School District
- Paint Rock Independent School District

All of Concho County is in the service area of Howard County Junior College District.

== See also ==
- National Register of Historic Places listings in Concho County, Texas
- Recorded Texas Historic Landmarks in Concho County
