= Eola, Texas =

- Unincorporated community
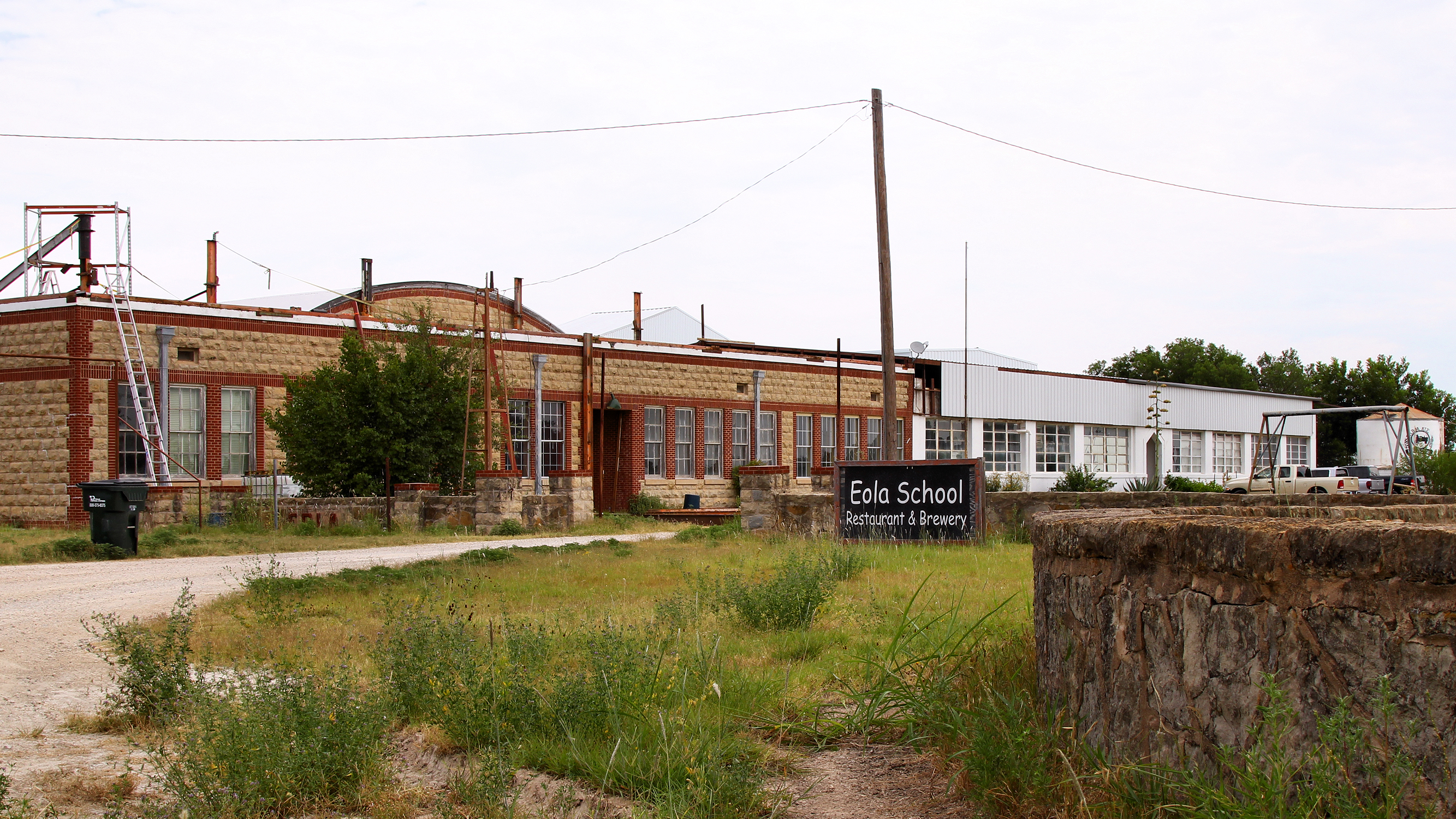
- The former Eola school is now a restaurant and brewery.

- Location within the state of Texas Eola (the United States)
- Coordinates: 31°23′56″N 100°05′21″W
- Country: United States
- State: Texas
- County: Concho
- Elevation: 1,808 ft (551 m)
- Time zone: UTC-6 (Central (CST))
  - Summer (DST): UTC-5 (CDT)
- ZIP code: 76937
- Area code: 325
- GNIS feature ID: 1357044

Eola is an unincorporated community in northwestern Concho County in the U.S. state of Texas. According to the Handbook of Texas, the community had a population of 218 in 2000.

== History ==
On May 14, 1995, an F0 tornado struck Eola.

Eola is home to the Earnest and Dorothy Barrow Foundation Museum.

== Geography ==
Eola is located at the intersection of Farm to Market Roads 381 and 765 on Dry Hollow, 13 mi (21 km) southwest of Paint Rock and 21 mi (34 km) east of San Angelo in northwestern Concho County.

== Education ==
Eola School remained open in 1963. Today, the community is served by the Eden Consolidated Independent School District.

The former Eola Independent School District building is now a restaurant and was listed on the National Register of Historic Places.

== Media ==
In 1981, Television station KLST (then known as KCT) started work on a transmitter located near Eola.

== See also ==
- Farm to Market Road 2402
- Texas State Highway Loop 577
