= Ethridge, Tennessee =

- Town
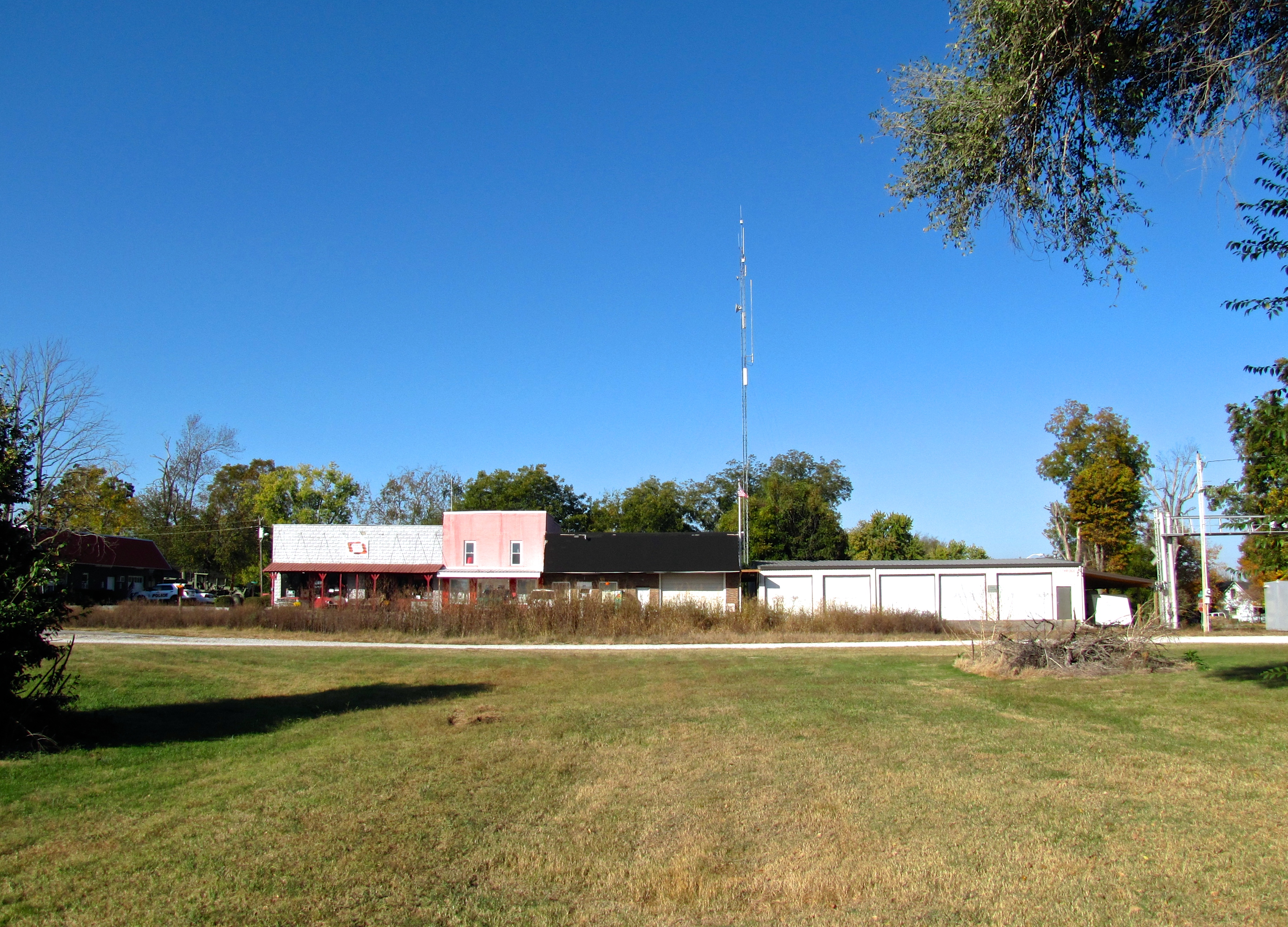
- Buildings along Depot Street

- Location of Ethridge stretches from Lawrence and Giles County, Tennessee.
- Coordinates: 35°19′16″N 87°18′8″W
- Country: United States
- State: Tennessee
- County: Lawrence

Area
  - Total: 1.15 sq mi (2.99 km^{2})
  - Land: 1.15 sq mi (2.99 km^{2})
  - Water: 0 sq mi (0.00 km^{2})
- Elevation: 981 ft (299 m)

Population (2020)
  - Total: 537
  - Density: 465.8/sq mi (179.84/km^{2})
- Time zone: UTC−6 (Central (CST))
  - Summer (DST): UTC−5 (CDT)
- ZIP Code: 38456
- Area code: 931
- FIPS code: 47-24460
- GNIS feature ID: 1283870
- Website: https://www.cityofethridge.com/

Ethridge is a town in Lawrence County, Tennessee, United States. As of the 2020 census, Ethridge had a population of 537.

== History ==
Ethridge began as a railroad stop known as Hudson Springs, which stood a few miles south of the present site of the town, in the 1880s. A political booster and store owner at the stop successfully petitioned the railroad to name the stop in honor of Emerson Etheridge, a prominent mid-19th century politician and post–Civil War candidate for governor. The current site of Ethridge, meanwhile, was located at the intersection of two mid-19th century cattle drovers' roads. When the railroad constructed a station at this site in the late 1890s, it was named Wayne Station. After constant confusion resulted in passengers bound for Wayne Station winding up at Ethridge, a prominent real estate broker in the area convinced the railroad to close the Ethridge stop and rename the Wayne Station stop "Ethridge".

By 1914, Ethridge's population had grown to 400, and the town was thriving as a lumber transloading station. At that time, Ethridge contained at least four lumber mills and one lumber finishing mill. Lumber from these mills and mills further out in the countryside was hauled to Ethridge and loaded onto trains. During this period, Ethridge had five grocery stores, a meat market, two barber shops, a post office, a hotel, and a tire pump factory. The town declined, however, following the Wall Street Crash of 1929 and the gradual supplanting of rail traffic by vehicle traffic in later years. Ethridge was incorporated in 1973, and is known for its concentration of Swartzentruber Amish.

== Geography ==
Ethridge is located at 35°19′16″N 87°18′8″W (35.321229, -87.302304). The town is situated at the intersection of U.S. Route 43 and a county road, Red Hill Road (signed as Main Street in Ethridge). Lawrenceburg lies a few miles to the south along US 43, and Mount Pleasant lies several miles to the north. The source of Little Shoal Creek, one of the headwater streams of Shoal Creek, is located just east of Ethridge. The source of the Buffalo River is located just west of Ethridge.

According to the United States Census Bureau, the town has a total area of 1.2 square miles (3.1 km^{2}), all land.

== Demographics ==
Historical population
Census	Pop.	Note	%±
1980	548		—
1990	565		3.1%
2000	536		−5.1%
2010	465		−13.2%
2020	537		15.5%

As of the census of 2000, there were 536 people, 210 households, and 153 families residing in the town. The population density was 457.8 inhabitants per square mile (176.8/km^{2}). There were 245 housing units at an average density of 209.2 per square mile (80.8/km^{2}). The racial makeup of the town was 99.63% White and 0.37% Pacific Islander. Hispanic or Latino of any race were 0.75% of the population.

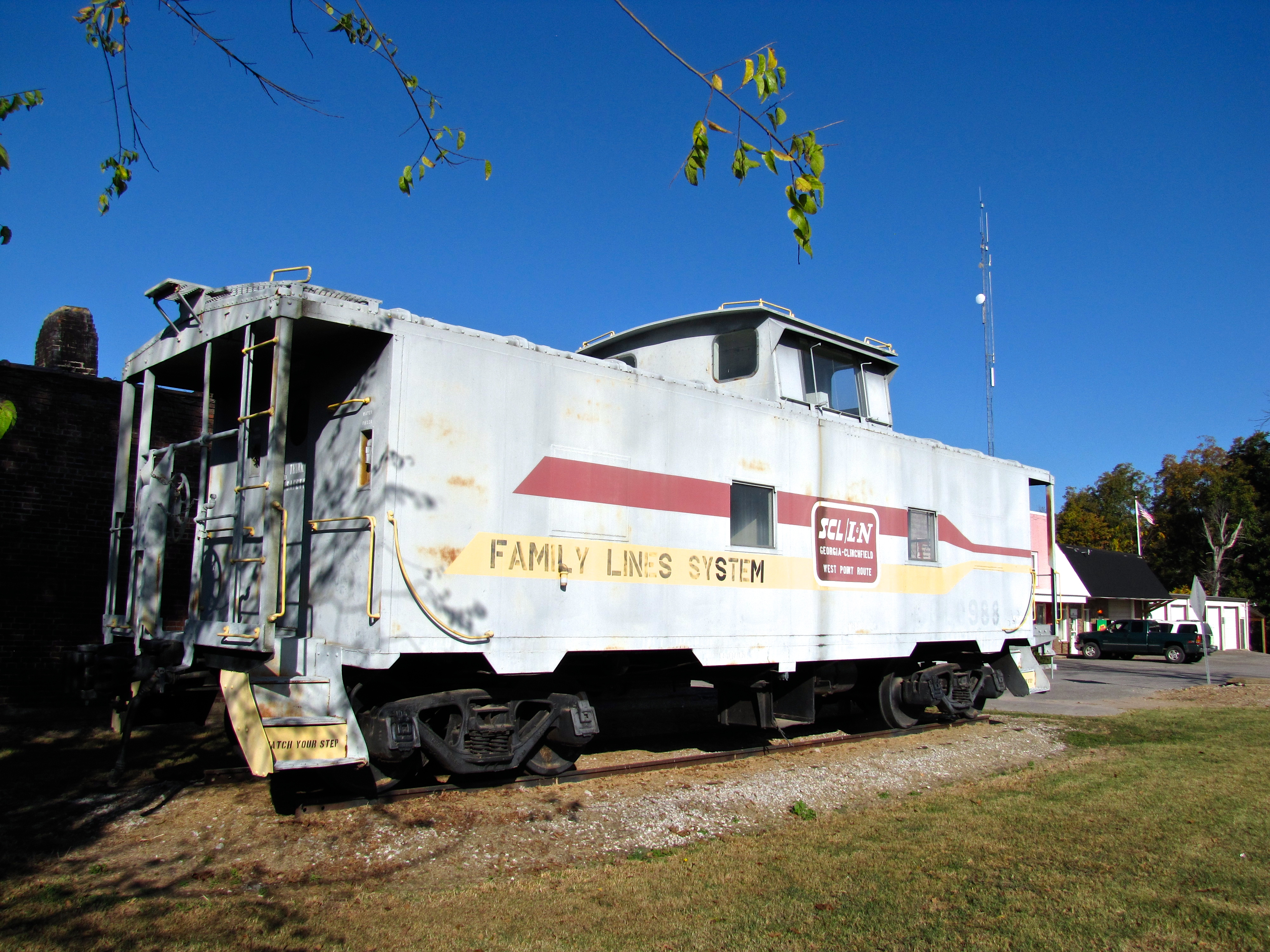
Seaboard Coast Line caboose on display in Ethridge

There were 210 households, out of which 33.3% had children under the age of 18 living with them, 52.4% were married couples living together, 16.7% had a female householder with no husband present, and 27.1% were non-families. Of all households, 22.4% were made up of individuals, and 11.9% had someone living alone who was 65 years of age or older. The average household size was 2.55 and the average family size was 2.98.

In the town, the population was spread out, with 25.6% under the age of 18, 11.0% from 18 to 24, 28.7% from 25 to 44, 22.8% from 45 to 64, and 11.9% who were 65 years of age or older. The median age was 34 years. For every 100 females, there were 97.8 males. For every 100 females age 18 and over, there were 90.0 males.

The median income for a household in the town was $28,542, and the median income for a family was $42,708. Males had a median income of $29,000 versus $18,125 for females. The per capita income for the town was $15,360. About 4.2% of families and 9.7% of the population were below the poverty line, including 7.5% of those under age 18 and 6.3% of those age 65 or over.
