= Paint Rock Independent School District =

School district in Texas

Coordinates: 31.5038°N 99.9251°W

Paint Rock Independent School District is a public school district based in Paint Rock, Texas (USA).

== Academic achievement ==
In 2009, the school district was rated "recognized" by the Texas Education Agency.

== Schools ==
The district has one school that serves students in grades pre-kindergarten through twelve.

== Special programs ==
=== Athletics ===
Paint Rock High School plays six-man football.

== See also ==
- List of school districts in Texas
