= Eden, Texas =

City in Concho County, Texas, United States

- City
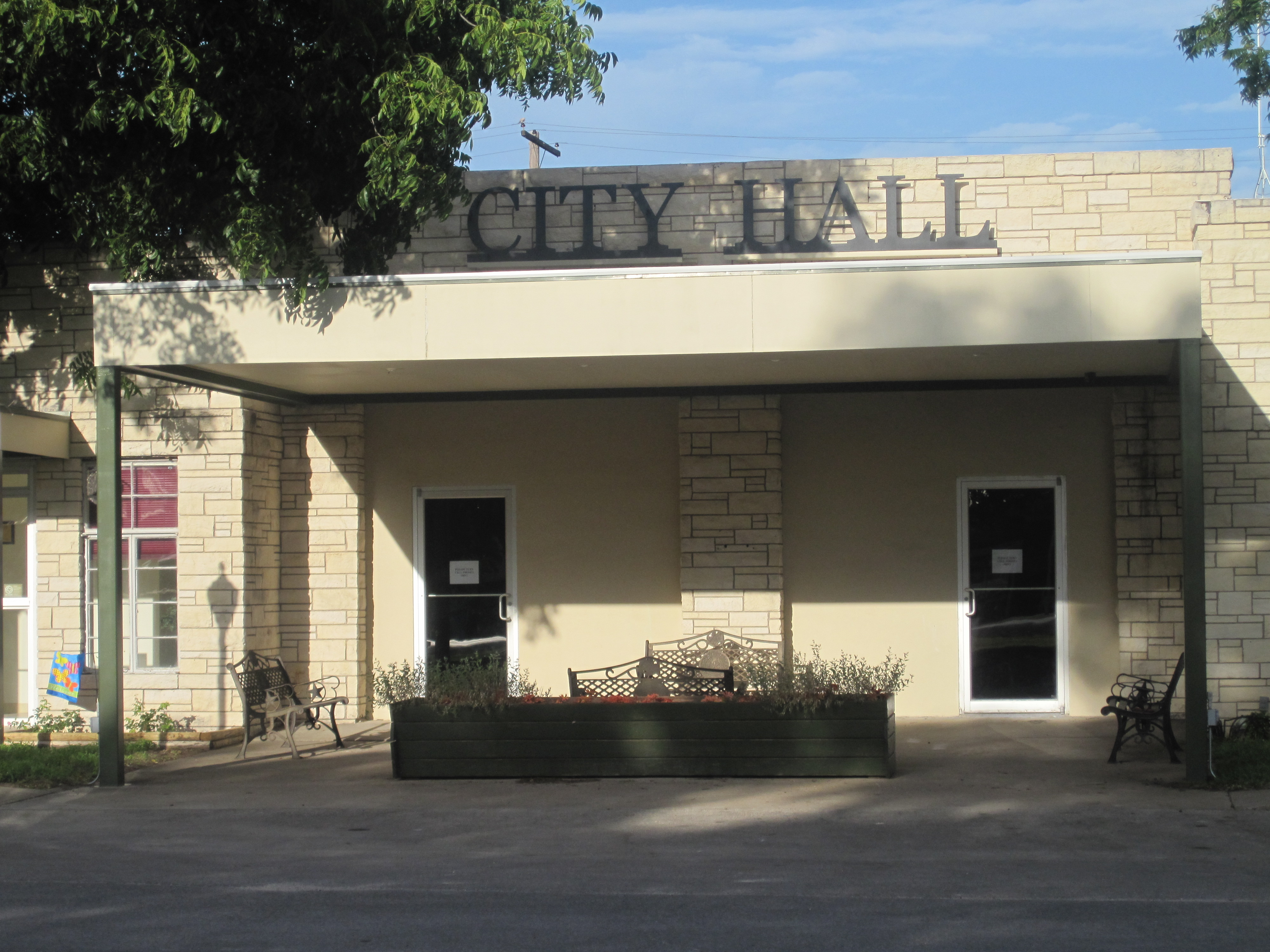
- Eden City Hall

- Location in Concho County

- Location in Texas Eden, Texas (the United States)
- Coordinates: 31°12′58″N 99°50′38″W
- Country: United States
- State: Texas
- County: Concho
- Incorporated: February 4, 1911

Government
  - Mayor: Renae Rodgers

Area
  - Total: 2.38 sq mi (6.16 km^{2})
  - Land: 2.38 sq mi (6.16 km^{2})
  - Water: 0 sq mi (0.00 km^{2})
- Elevation: 2,051 ft (625 m)

Population (2020)
  - Total: 1,100
  - Density: 460/sq mi (180/km^{2})
- Time zone: UTC-6 (Central (CST))
  - Summer (DST): UTC-5 (CDT)
- ZIP code: 76837
- Area code: 325
- FIPS code: 48-22552
- GNIS feature ID: 2410398
- Website: www.edentexas.com

Eden is a city in Concho County, Texas, United States. Its population was 1,100 at the 2020 census. The community is a rural trading center for agricultural products for the many large ranches and farms in West Texas.

== History ==
The earliest settlers were the family of Harvey and Louisa McCarty. Frederick Ede and his family moved to the area around 1881. In 1882, Ede donated 40 acres (16 ha) of land to be used as a townsite and to build a town square. The following year, a post office was established and was named "Eden", an adaptation of Frederick Ede's name.

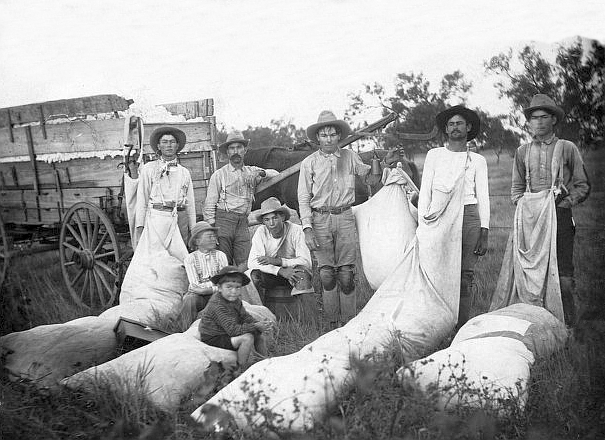
Picking cotton in Eden, c. 1895

A school was established in 1885.

By 1890, Eden had a general store, a jeweler, a saloon, a Baptist church (organized in 1886), and a population exceeding 100. A newspaper, The Eden Echo, was founded in 1906. That same year, a bank was established. Telephone service arrived about 1907, and a public well and windmill were installed in 1908.

Eden was incorporated on February 4, 1911. That same year, the Gulf, Colorado and Santa Fe Railway completed a 98 mi (158 km) line between Eden and Lometa, located east of Eden.

By 1914, Eden had a restaurant, two general stores, two hotels, two cotton gins, two lumber companies, two hardware stores, a Baptist church, and a Methodist church. Its population was 600.

The Eden Independent School District was established in 1920, and electricity arrived in Eden in 1925.

Eden became a trading center for wool and mohair after 1925, as sheep and goat ranching in the area increased. Local ranchers also began raising cattle, as well as polo ponies for eastern markets.

In 1961, the first F-105 fighter-bomber delivered to the U.S. Air Force 49th Tactical Fighter Wing was named the Kordel-Eden, after Kordel, Germany, and the pilot's hometown of Eden, Texas.

== Geography ==
According to the United States Census Bureau, the city has a total area of 2.4 square miles (6.2 km^{2}), all land.

Eden, at 31°8'N, 99°30'W, is near (about 31 miles from) the geograpical center of Texas at roughly 31°21′N, 99°14′W, near the town of Rochelle.

=== Climate ===
The climate in this area is characterized by hot, humid summers and generally mild to cool winters. According to the Köppen climate classification, Eden has a humid subtropical climate, Cfa on climate maps.

Climate data for Eden, Texas, 1991–2020 normals, extremes 1938–present
Month	Jan	Feb	Mar	Apr	May	Jun	Jul	Aug	Sep	Oct	Nov	Dec	Year
Record high °F (°C)	90 (32)	94 (34)	100 (38)	103 (39)	108 (42)	111 (44)	111 (44)	111 (44)	109 (43)	105 (41)	92 (33)	91 (33)	111 (44)
Mean maximum °F (°C)	79.9 (26.6)	83.7 (28.7)	87.8 (31.0)	93.2 (34.0)	97.3 (36.3)	100.0 (37.8)	101.1 (38.4)	101.7 (38.7)	97.1 (36.2)	91.3 (32.9)	82.9 (28.3)	79.8 (26.6)	103.4 (39.7)
Mean daily maximum °F (°C)	57.6 (14.2)	63.2 (17.3)	69.8 (21.0)	78.1 (25.6)	84.8 (29.3)	90.8 (32.7)	94.3 (34.6)	94.6 (34.8)	87.1 (30.6)	78.5 (25.8)	66.8 (19.3)	59.6 (15.3)	77.1 (25.0)
Daily mean °F (°C)	44.3 (6.8)	49.1 (9.5)	56.0 (13.3)	63.5 (17.5)	72.1 (22.3)	78.8 (26.0)	81.8 (27.7)	81.8 (27.7)	74.4 (23.6)	64.9 (18.3)	53.8 (12.1)	46.1 (7.8)	63.9 (17.7)
Mean daily minimum °F (°C)	31.0 (−0.6)	34.9 (1.6)	42.1 (5.6)	48.8 (9.3)	59.4 (15.2)	66.9 (19.4)	69.3 (20.7)	68.9 (20.5)	61.7 (16.5)	51.2 (10.7)	40.9 (4.9)	32.6 (0.3)	50.6 (10.3)
Mean minimum °F (°C)	13.9 (−10.1)	16.9 (−8.4)	21.1 (−6.1)	30.3 (−0.9)	40.6 (4.8)	57.3 (14.1)	63.0 (17.2)	59.8 (15.4)	47.9 (8.8)	31.9 (−0.1)	21.5 (−5.8)	16.1 (−8.8)	10.6 (−11.9)
Record low °F (°C)	−1 (−18)	−1 (−18)	9 (−13)	23 (−5)	32 (0)	44 (7)	50 (10)	50 (10)	36 (2)	20 (−7)	13 (−11)	7 (−14)	−1 (−18)
Average precipitation inches (mm)	1.14 (29)	1.55 (39)	2.18 (55)	1.79 (45)	3.47 (88)	3.18 (81)	1.82 (46)	2.58 (66)	3.03 (77)	2.80 (71)	1.81 (46)	1.16 (29)	26.51 (672)
Source 1: NOAA
Source 2: National Weather Service

== Demographics ==
Historical population
Census	Pop.	Note	%±
1920	593		—
1930	1,194		101.3%
1940	1,603		34.3%
1950	1,993		24.3%
1960	1,486		−25.4%
1970	1,291		−13.1%
1980	1,294		0.2%
1990	1,567		21.1%
2000	2,561		63.4%
2010	2,766		8.0%
2020	1,100		−60.2%
2021 (est.)	1,543		40.3%
U.S. Decennial Census

=== 2020 census ===
As of the 2020 census, Eden had 1,100 people, 428 households, and 223 families residing in the city. The median age was 47.8 years; 23.0% of the residents were under 18, and 27.3% were 65 or older. The female/male ratio was 1:0.920 overall and 1:0.866 for 18 and over.

None of the residents lived in urban areas, while 100.0% lived in rural areas.

Of the 428 households in Eden, 30.6% had children under 18 living in them, 47.2% were married-couple households, 19.4% were households with a male householder and no spouse or partner present, and 29.0% were households with a female householder and no spouse or partner present. About 26.7% of all households were made up of individuals, and 15.4% had someone living alone who was 65 or older.

The city had 514 housing units, of which 16.7% were vacant. The homeowner vacancy rate was 4.0% and the rental vacancy rate was 9.8%.

Racial composition as of the 2020 census
Race	Number	Percentage
White	785	71.4%
Black or African American	18	1.6%
American Indian and Alaska Native	7	0.6%
Asian	2	0.2%
Native Hawaiian and other Pacific Islander	1	0.1%
Some other race	86	7.8%
Two or more races	201	18.3%
Hispanic or Latino (of any race)	470	42.7%

Eden racial composition (NH = Non-Hispanic) (Note: Note: the US Census treats Hispanic/Latino as an ethnic category. This table excludes Latinos from the racial categories and assigns them to a separate category. Hispanics/Latinos can be of any race.)
Race	Number	Percentage
White (NH)	583	53.0%
Black or African American (NH)	10	0.91%
Native American or Alaska Native (NH)	6	0.55%
Asian (NH)	2	0.18%
Pacific Islander (NH)	1	0.09%
Some other race (NH)	4	0.36%
Multiracial (NH)	24	2.18%
Hispanic or Latino	470	42.73%
Total	1,100	

=== 2000 census ===
As of the 2000 census, 2,561 people, 499 households, and 333 families resided in the city. The population density was 1,055.2 inhabitants per square mile (407.4/km^{2}). The 602 housing units averaged 248.0 per square mile (95.7/km^{2}). The racial makeup of the city was 90.63% White, 1.52% African American, 0.35% Native American, 0.04% Asian, 0.16% Pacific Islander, 6.48% from other races, and 0.82% from two or more races. Hispanics or Latinos of any race were 51.43% of the population.

Of the 499 households, 32.1% had children under 18 living with them, 51.9% were married couples living together, 12.8% had a female householder with no husband present, and 33.1% were not families. About 31.7% of all households were made up of individuals, and 17.6% had someone living alone who was 65 or older. The average household size was 2.39 and the average family size was 3.00.

In the city, the population was distributed as 12.3% under 18, 12.7% from 18 to 24, 47.4% from 25 to 44, 16.6% from 45 to 64, and 11.0% who were 65 or older. The median age was 34 years. For every 100 females, there were 262.2 males. For every 100 females age 18 and over, there were 320.6 males.

The median income in the city for a household was $28,636 and for a family was $34,750. Males had a median income of $17,341 versus $20,000 for females. The per capita income for the city was $12,119. About 8.8% of families and 15.6% of the population were below the poverty line, including 21.8% of those under 18 and 16.9% of those 65 or over.

== Education ==
The City of Eden is served by the Eden Consolidated Independent School District. Eden Elementary School and Eden High School are located in the city.

All of Concho County is in the service area of Howard County Junior College District.

== Infrastructure ==
The United States Postal Service operates the Eden Post Office.

The Eden Detention Center incarcerates male federal prisoners who are primarily criminal aliens who will be deported upon release. The facility is operated by Corrections Corporation of America on behalf of the Federal Bureau of Prisons, employs 285 staff, and has a capacity of 1,558 inmates.

Concho County Hospital is a 16-bed general medical and surgical hospital in Eden. It has an emergency room and four staff doctors.

== Notable people ==
- Gwinn Henry, football player and coach
- James Earl Rudder, U.S. Army general and president of Texas A&M University

== Gallery ==
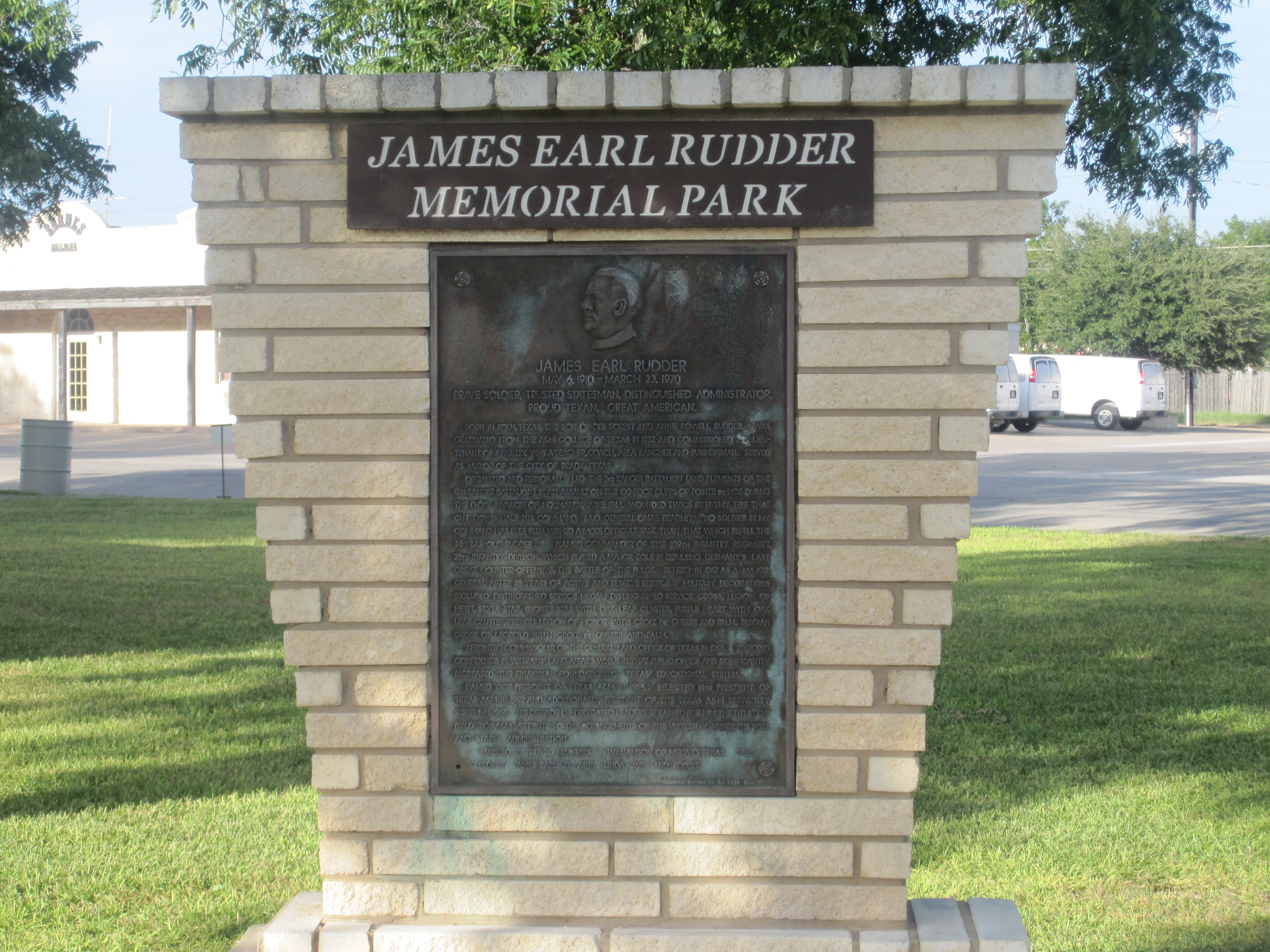
James Earl Rudder Memorial Park

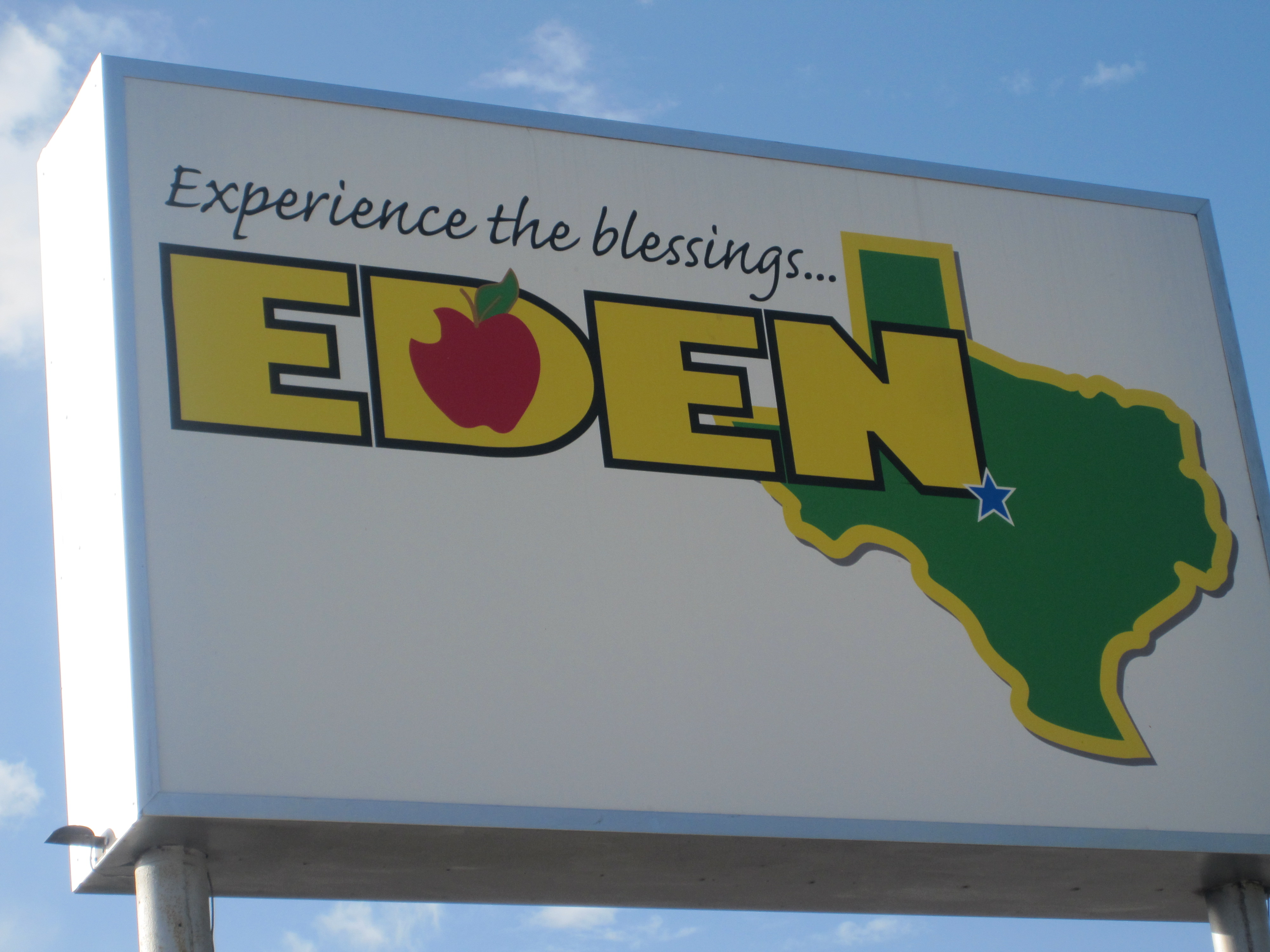
Welcome sign

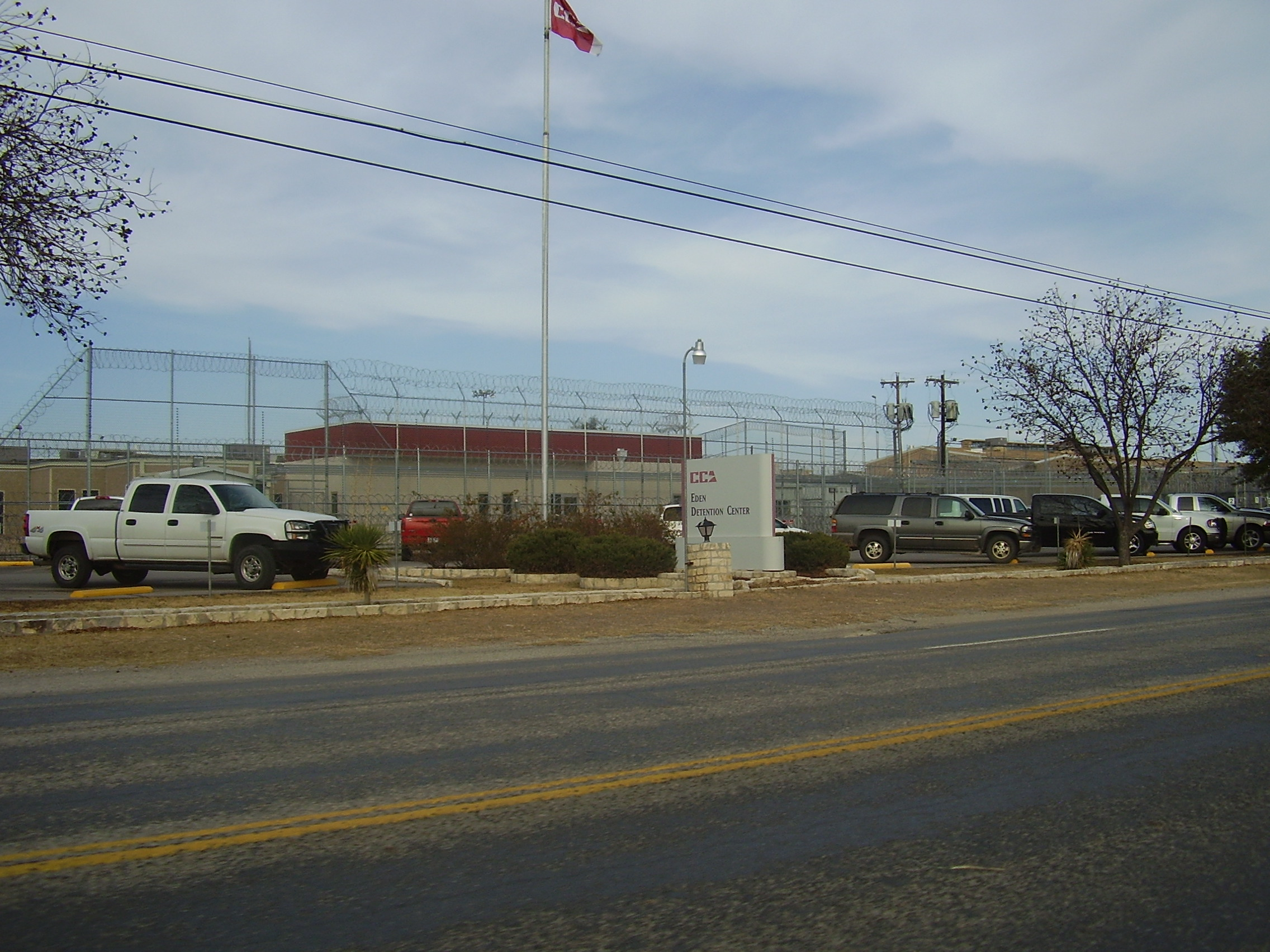
Eden Detention Center

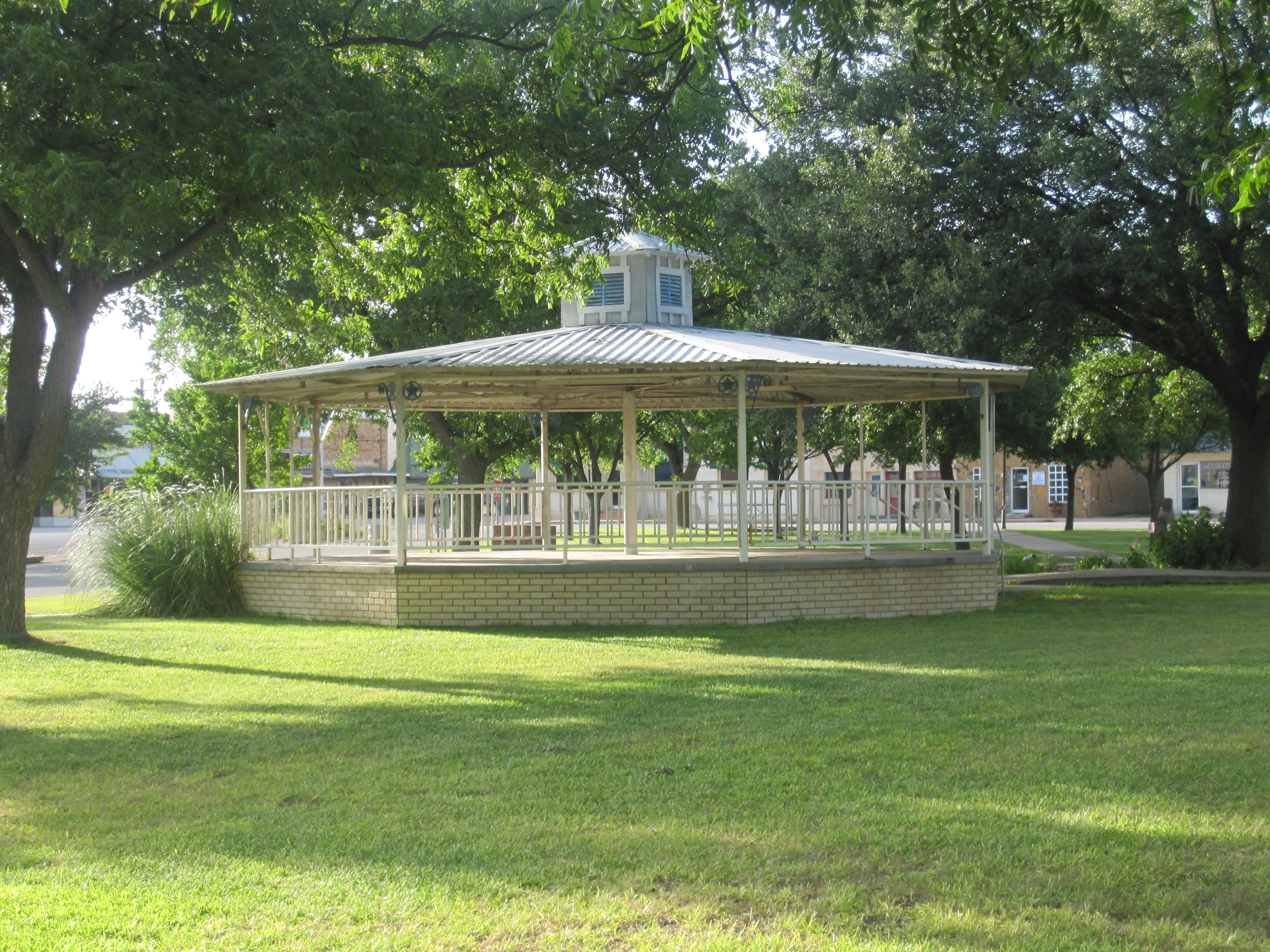
Gazebo in James Earl Rudder Park

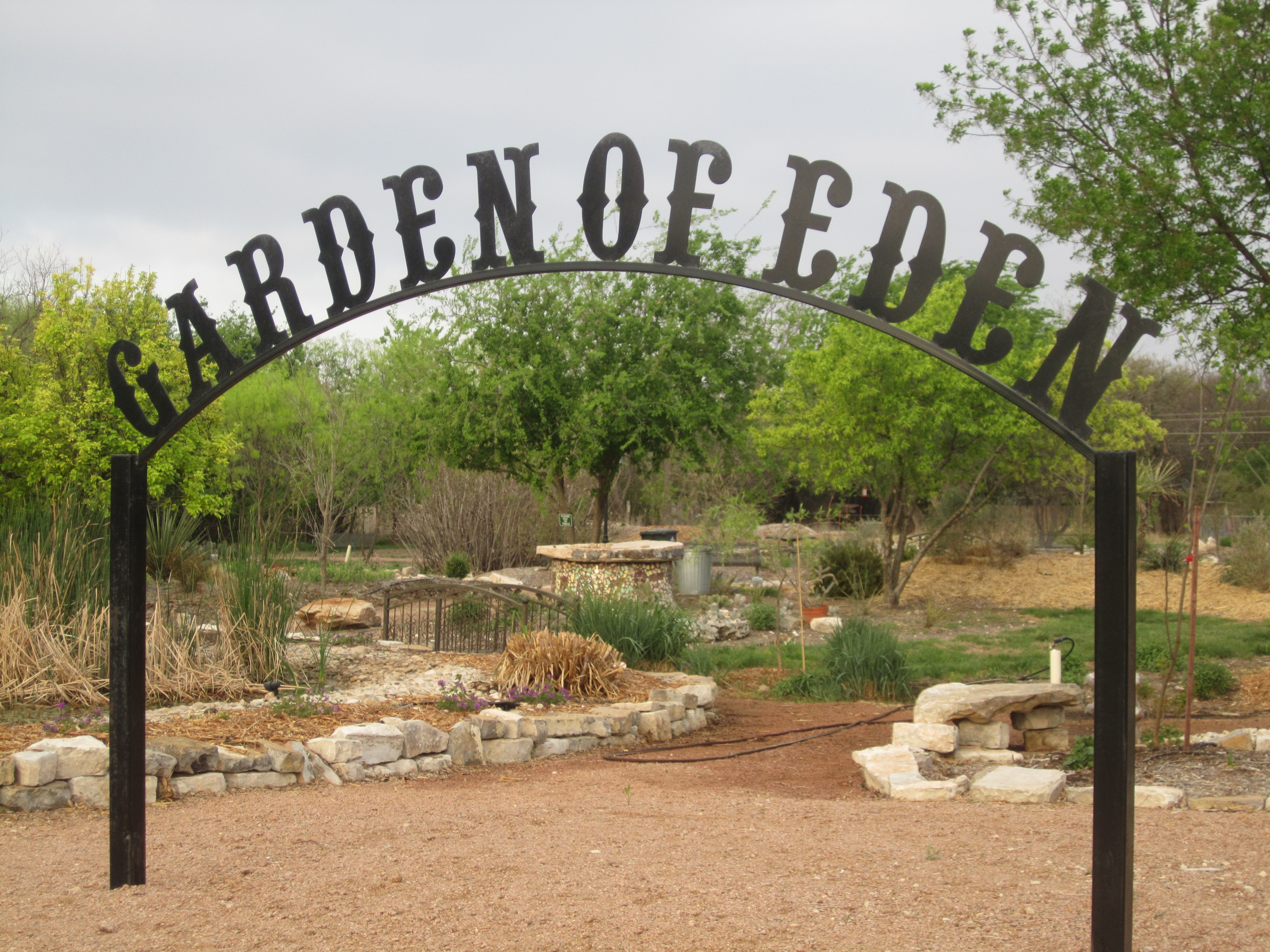
The "Garden of Eden" green space and nature trails in Eden

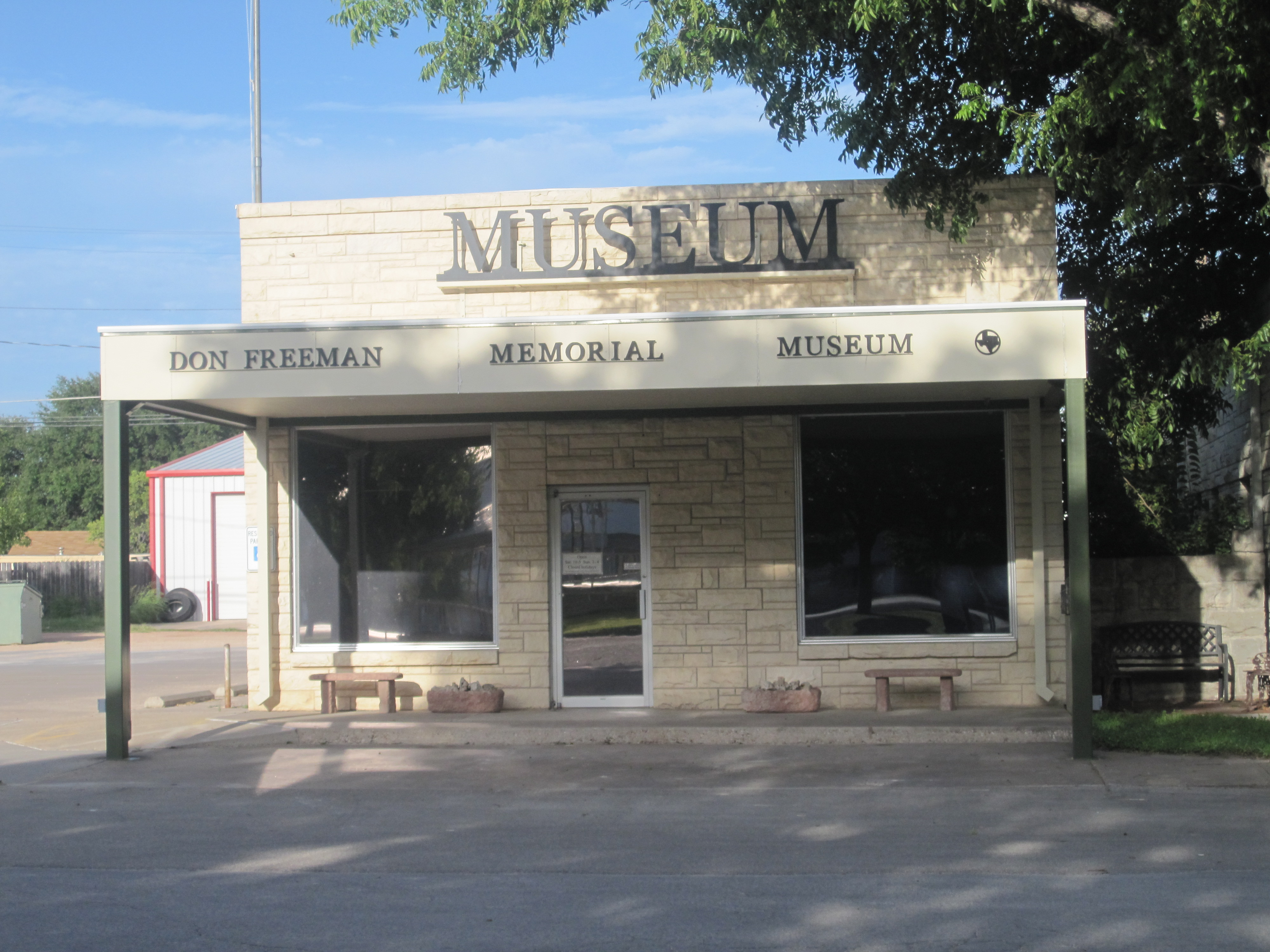
Don Freeman Memorial Museum
