= Paint Rock, Texas =

- Town
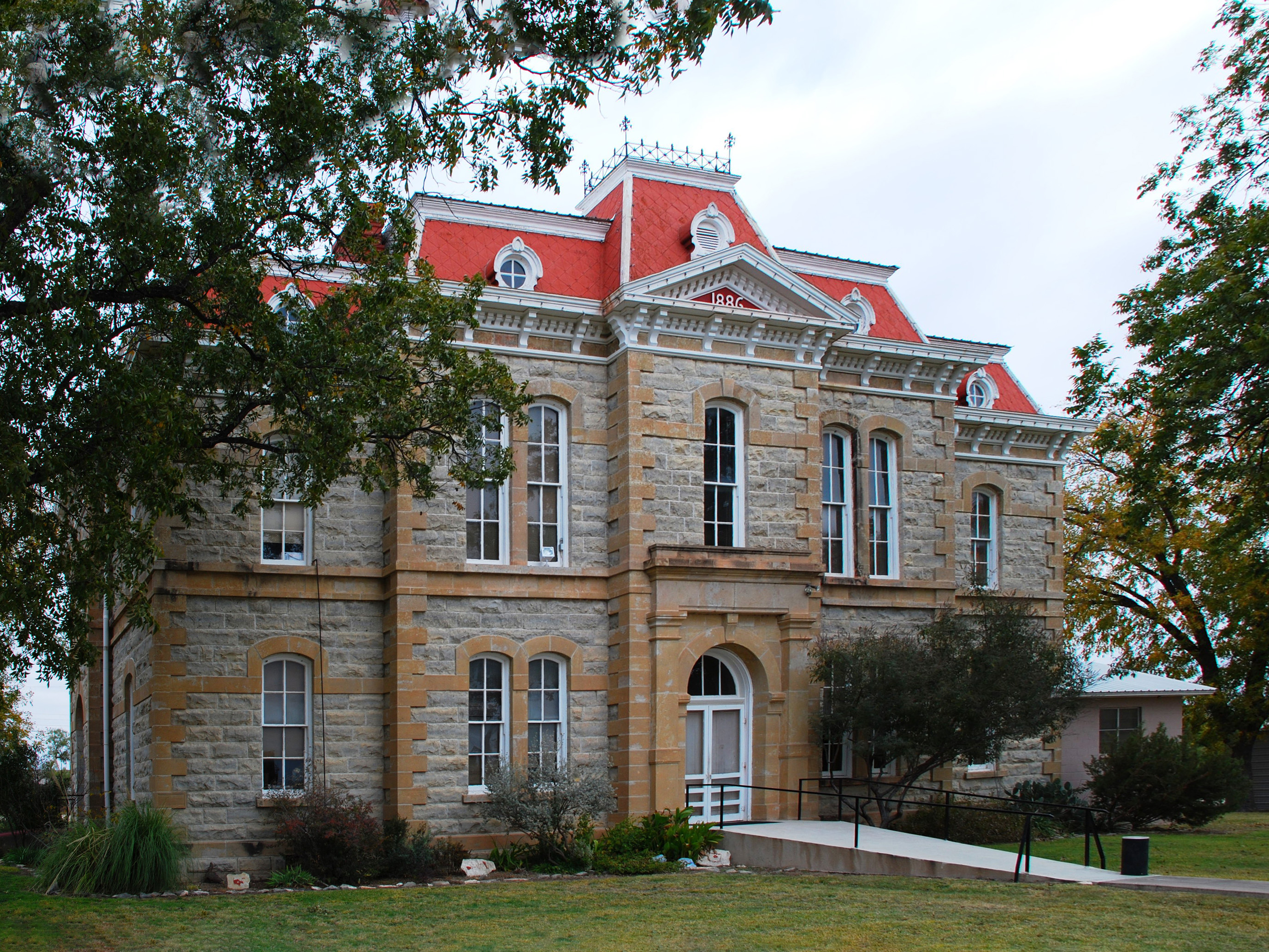
- The Concho County Courthouse in Paint Rock

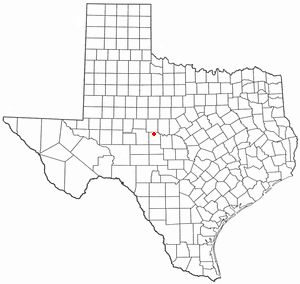
- Location of Paint Rock, Texas

- Coordinates: 31°30′25″N 99°55′20″W
- Country: United States
- State: Texas
- County: Concho

Area
  - Total: 1.64 sq mi (4.26 km^{2})
  - Land: 1.64 sq mi (4.26 km^{2})
  - Water: 0 sq mi (0.00 km^{2})
- Elevation: 1,631 ft (497 m)

Population (2020)
  - Total: 237
  - Density: 144.1/sq mi (55.63/km^{2})
- Time zone: UTC-6 (Central (CST))
  - Summer (DST): UTC-5 (CDT)
- ZIP code: 76866
- Area code: 325
- FIPS code: 48-54636
- GNIS feature ID: 2413100
- Website: paintrock.texas.gov

Paint Rock is a town in and the county seat of Concho County, Texas, United States. The population was 237 at the 2020 census.

The town's name comes from Native American pictographs painted on cliffs overlooking the nearby Concho River. These pictographs cover nearly half a mile upstream from the town of Paint Rock. Some of the pictures painted on the rocks include animals, human figures, and handprints. A few of the pictographs there were made by the Comanche, who likely used the bluff as a camp site; they may have also fought the Texas Rangers there. They are located on a private ranch, property of the Campbell family who protect them and organizes tours for visitors.

== Geography ==
Paint Rock is located in northern Concho County along U.S. Route 83. Eden is 20 miles (32 km) to the south and Ballinger is 16 miles (26 km) to the north via US 83, while San Angelo is 32 miles (51 km) to the west via secondary roads.

According to the United States Census Bureau, the town of Paint Rock has a total area of 1.64 square miles (4.26 km^{2}), all land.

== Historic literary reference ==
A chapter titled "An Episode of Paint Rock" is devoted to the town in the 1895 book, A Lone Star Bo-Peep, and Other Tales of Texan Ranch Life written by Howard Seely. The chapter chronicles the week of May 5, 1883, in Paint Rock and features several local residents in the text.

== Demographics ==
Historical population
Census	Pop.	Note	%±
1890	323		—
1970	193		—
1980	256		32.6%
1990	227		−11.3%
2000	320		41.0%
2010	273		−14.7%
2020	237		−13.2%
U.S. Decennial Census

=== 2020 census ===
Paint Rock racial composition (NH = Non-Hispanic) (Note: Note: the US Census treats Hispanic/Latino as an ethnic category. This table excludes Latinos from the racial categories and assigns them to a separate category. Hispanics/Latinos can be of any race.)
Race	Number	Percentage
White (NH)	170	71.73%
Black or African American (NH)	1	0.42%
Some Other Race (NH)	2	0.84%
Mixed/Multi-Racial (NH)	7	2.95%
Hispanic or Latino	57	24.05%
Total	237	

As of the 2020 United States census, there were 237 people, 109 households, and 94 families residing in the town.

=== 2000 census ===
As of the census of 2000, 320 people, 110 households, and 83 families resided in the town. The population density was 192.7 inhabitants per square mile (74.4/km^{2}). The 126 housing units averaged 75.9 per square mile (29.3/km^{2}). The racial makeup of the town was 77.19% White, 2.81% Native American, 19.69% from other races, and 0.31% from two or more races. Hispanics or Latinos were 28.44% of the population.

Of the 110 households, 41.8% had children under the age of 18 living with them, 64.5% were married couples living together, 9.1% had a female householder with no husband present, and 24.5% were not families. About 21.8% of all households were made up of individuals, and 9.1% had someone living alone who was 65 years of age or older. The average household size was 2.91 and the average family size was 3.45.

In the town, the population was distributed as 30.6% under the age of 18, 7.8% from 18 to 24, 26.6% from 25 to 44, 21.6% from 45 to 64, and 13.4% who were 65 years of age or older. The median age was 35 years. For every 100 females, there were 86.0 males. For every 100 females age 18 and over, there were 88.1 males.

The median income for a household in the town was $32,500, and for a family was $33,750. Males had a median income of $21,786 versus $21,250 for females. The per capita income for the town was $12,965. About 13.0% of families and 15.9% of the population were below the poverty line, including 24.7% of those under age 18 and 11.1% of those age 65 or over.

== Education ==
The town is served by the Paint Rock Independent School District.

All of Concho County is in the service area of Howard County Junior College District.

== Climate ==
The climate in this area is characterized by hot, humid summers and generally mild to cool winters. According to the Köppen climate classification system, Paint Rock has a humid subtropical climate, Cfa on climate maps.

Climate data for Paint Rock, Texas (1991–2020 normals, extremes 1963–present)
Month	Jan	Feb	Mar	Apr	May	Jun	Jul	Aug	Sep	Oct	Nov	Dec	Year
Record high °F (°C)	89 (32)	98 (37)	98 (37)	104 (40)	111 (44)	112 (44)	111 (44)	112 (44)	110 (43)	103 (39)	93 (34)	89 (32)	112 (44)
Mean daily maximum °F (°C)	60.0 (15.6)	63.9 (17.7)	71.4 (21.9)	80.3 (26.8)	87.1 (30.6)	93.2 (34.0)	96.2 (35.7)	96.0 (35.6)	89.0 (31.7)	80.3 (26.8)	68.6 (20.3)	60.3 (15.7)	78.9 (26.1)
Daily mean °F (°C)	45.2 (7.3)	49.1 (9.5)	56.8 (13.8)	65.3 (18.5)	73.9 (23.3)	80.9 (27.2)	83.7 (28.7)	83.3 (28.5)	76.2 (24.6)	66.1 (18.9)	54.4 (12.4)	46.0 (7.8)	65.1 (18.4)
Mean daily minimum °F (°C)	30.3 (−0.9)	34.3 (1.3)	42.2 (5.7)	50.3 (10.2)	60.7 (15.9)	68.5 (20.3)	71.3 (21.8)	70.5 (21.4)	63.4 (17.4)	51.9 (11.1)	40.2 (4.6)	31.7 (−0.2)	51.3 (10.7)
Record low °F (°C)	2 (−17)	−8 (−22)	8 (−13)	22 (−6)	35 (2)	44 (7)	56 (13)	51 (11)	36 (2)	23 (−5)	12 (−11)	−4 (−20)	−8 (−22)
Average precipitation inches (mm)	1.06 (27)	1.57 (40)	1.78 (45)	1.51 (38)	3.04 (77)	3.50 (89)	2.05 (52)	2.39 (61)	2.33 (59)	2.36 (60)	1.81 (46)	1.17 (30)	24.57 (624)
Average precipitation days (≥ 0.01 in)	4.2	4.1	4.1	3.5	7.0	5.9	4.0	4.8	4.8	4.8	4.0	3.7	54.9
Source: NOAA
