= Audie Award for Humor =

Annual award for audiobooks

The Audie Award for Humor is one of the Audie Awards presented annually by the Audio Publishers Association (APA). It awards excellence in narration, production, and content for a humor audiobook released in a given year. It has been awarded since 1997.

== Winners and finalists ==
Winners are listed first and highlighted in light green.

=== 1990s ===
Year	Title	Author(s)	Narrator(s)	Publisher	Result	Ref.
1997 2nd	Calvin Trillin, Piece by Piece (1995)	Calvin Trillin	Calvin Trillin	HighBridge Audio	Winner	
1997 2nd	The Definitive Biography of P. D. Q. Bach (1976)	Peter Schickele	Peter Schickele	HighBridge Audio	Finalist	
1997 2nd	The Rants (1996)	Dennis Miller	Dennis Miller	Bantam Doubleday Dell Audio	Finalist	
1998 3rd	Dirk Gently's Holistic Detective Agency (1987)	Douglas Adams	Douglas Adams	Dove Audio	Winner	
1998 3rd	Babyhood (1997)	Paul Reiser	Dennis Miller	Bantam Doubleday Dell Audio	Finalist	
1998 3rd	Into the Twilight, Endlessly Grousing (1997)	Patrick F. McManus	Terry Beaver	Simon & Schuster Audio	Finalist	
1999 4th	Ranting Again (1998)	Dennis Miller	Dennis Miller	Bantam Doubleday Dell Audio	Winner	
1999 4th	God Is My Broker (1998)	Christopher Buckley and John Tierney (as "Brother Ty")	Mark Linn-Baker	Bantam Doubleday Dell Audio	Finalist	
1999 4th	Pure Drivel (1998)	Steve Martin	Steve Martin	Simon & Schuster Audio	Finalist	

=== 2000s ===
Year	Title	Author(s)	Narrator(s)	Publisher	Result	Ref.
2000 5th	How Paul Robeson Saved My Life, and Other Mostly Happy Stories (1999)	Carl Reiner	Carl Reiner	NewStar Media	Winner	
2000 5th	How Men Have Babies (1999)	Alan Thicke	Alan Thicke	The Audio Partners	Finalist	
2000 5th	Rants Redux (1999)	Dennis Miller	Dennis Miller	Bantam Doubleday Dell Audio	Finalist	
2001 6th	Bridget Jones: The Edge of Reason (2004)	Helen Fielding	Tracie Bennett	Random House Audio	Winner	
2001 6th	Me Talk Pretty One Day (2000)	David Sedaris	David Sedaris	Time Warner AudioBooks	Finalist	
2001 6th	Pretty Good Joke Tape (2000)	Garrison Keillor	Garrison Keillor, Roy Blount, Jr., and Paula Poundstone	HighBridge Audio	Finalist	
2002 7th	Napalm and Silly Putty (2001)	George Carlin	George Carlin	HighBridge Audio	Winner	
2002 7th	Blandings Castle (1935)	P. G. Wodehouse	Jonathan Cecil	Chivers North America	Finalist	
2002 7th	The New Joys of Yiddish (2001)	Leo Rosten	Ron Rifkin, Peter Riegert, Harry Goz, Michael Goz, Larry Keith, and Carole Shelley	Random House Audio	Finalist	
2003 8th	Things You Shouldn't Say Past Midnight (2000)	Peter Ackerman	Jeffrey Donovan, Richard Kind, Clea Lewis, Alan Mandell, Mandy Siegfried, and Joey Slotnick	L.A. Theatre Works	Winner	
2003 8th	Jump the Shark: When Good Things Go Bad (2001)	Jon Hein	Jon Hein	Listen & Live Audio	Finalist	
2003 8th	Mirth of a Nation (2000)	Michael J. Rosen	Tony Roberts, David Rakoff, Gary Trudeau, Paul Rudnick, Rick Moranis, et al.	HarperAudio	Finalist	
2003 8th	Sixteen Scandals (2002)	William Strauss and Elaina Newport	William Strauss and Elaina Newport	Sourcebooks	Finalist	
2003 8th	Stupid White Men ...and Other Sorry Excuses for the State of the Nation! (2001)	Michael Moore	Arte Johnson	New Millennium Audio	Finalist	
2004 9th	Live at Carnegie Hall (2003)	David Sedaris	David Sedaris	Time Warner Audio	Winner	
2004 9th	Boogers Are My Beat (2003)	Dave Barry	Dick Hill	Brilliance Audio	Finalist	
2004 9th	The Funny Thing Is… (2003)	Ellen DeGeneres	Ellen DeGeneres	Simon & Schuster Audio	Finalist	
2004 9th	Shopaholic Takes Manhattan (2001)	Sophie Kinsella	Emily Gray	Recorded Books	Finalist	
2004 9th	The Pleasure of My Company (2003)	Steve Martin	Steve Martin	Time Warner AudioBooks	Finalist	
2005 10th	Dress Your Family in Corduroy and Denim (2004)	David Sedaris	David Sedaris	Time Warner Audio	Winner	
2005 10th	America (The Book) (2004)	Jon Stewart and the writers of The Daily Show	Jon Stewart et al.	Time Warner Audiobooks	Finalist	
2005 10th	My Life as a 10-Year-Old Boy (2000)	Nancy Cartwright	Nancy Cartwright	Blackstone Audio	Finalist	
2005 10th	The Reluctant Metrosexual (2004)	Peter Hyman	Peter Hyman	Blackstone Audio	Finalist	
2005 10th	When Will Jesus Bring the Pork Chops? (2004)	George Carlin	George Carlin	Time Warner AudioBooks	Finalist	
2006 11th	The Truth (With Jokes) (2005)	Al Franken	Al Franken	Brilliance Audio	Winner	
2006 11th	The Adventures of Guy Noir (2005)	Garrison Keillor	Garrison Keillor and full cast	HighBridge Audio	Finalist	
2006 11th	Car Talk (2005)	Tom Magliozzi and Ray Magliozzi	Tom Magliozzi and Ray Magliozzi	HighBridge Audio	Finalist	
2006 11th	Fired! (2006)	Annabelle Gurwitch	Annabelle Gurwitch, Charlayne Woodard, Carl Capotorto, Dana Gould, et al.	L.A. Theatre Works	Finalist	
2006 11th	Nothing's Sacred (2005)	Lewis Black	Lewis Black	Simon & Schuster Audio	Finalist	
2007 12th	Spoiled Rotten America (2006)	Larry Miller	Larry Miller	HarperAudio	Winner	
2007 12th	Company (2006)	Max Barry	William Dufris	Tantor Audio	Finalist	
2007 12th	F.U.B.A.R.: America's Right-Wing Nightmare (2006)	Sam Seder and Stephen Sherrill	Sam Seder	HarperAudio	Finalist	
2007 12th	Solomon vs. Lord (2005)	Paul Levine	Christopher Lane	Blackstone Audio	Finalist	
2007 12th	The Areas of My Expertise (2005)	John Hodgman	John Hodgman	Penguin Audio	Finalist	
2008 13th	I Am America (And So Can You!) (2007)	Stephen Colbert	Stephen Colbert, Paul Dinello, Kevin Dorff, Greg Hollimon, Evie McGee, David Pasquesi, Amy Sedaris, Allison Silverman, Brian Stack, and Jon Stewart	Hachette Audio	Winner	
2008 13th	Don't Make a Black Woman Take Off Her Earrings (2006)	Tyler Perry	Tyler Perry	Penguin Audio	Finalist	
2008 13th	Our Dumb World (2007)	The Onion	The Onion	Hachette Audio	Finalist	
2008 13th	Plato and a Platypus Walk Into a Bar (2007)	Thomas Cathcart and Daniel Klein	Johnny Heller	Recorded Books	Finalist	
2008 13th	The Ultimate David Sedaris Box Set (2007)	David Sedaris	David Sedaris, Amy Sedaris, and Ann Magnuson	Hachette Audio	Finalist	
2009 14th	The Learners (2008)	Chip Kidd	Bronson Pinchot	Blackstone Audio	Winner	
2009 14th	When You Are Engulfed in Flames (2008)	David Sedaris	David Sedaris	Hachette Audio	Finalist	
2009 14th	Atomic Lobster (2008)	Tim Dorsey	Oliver Wyman	HarperAudio	Finalist	
2009 14th	Martin Misunderstood (2008)	Karin Slaughter	Wayne Knight	BBC Audiobooks America	Finalist	
2009 14th	Me of Little Faith (2008)	Lewis Black	Lewis Black	Penguin Audio	Finalist	

=== 2010s ===
Year	Title	Authors(s)	Narrator(s)	Publisher	Result	Ref.
2010 15th	Church People: The Lutherans of Lake Wobegon (2009)	Garrison Keillor	Garrison Keillor	HighBridge Audio	Winner	
2010 15th	Don't Say I Didn't Warn You (2009)	Anita Renfroe	Anita Renfroe	Hyperion Audio	Finalist	
2010 15th	I Drink for a Reason (2009)	David Cross	David Cross	Hachette Audio	Finalist	
2010 15th	I Shudder (2009)	Paul Rudnick	Paul Rudnick	HarperAudio	Finalist	
2010 15th	More Information Than You Require (2008)	John Hodgman	John Hodgman and full cast	Penguin Audiobooks	Finalist	
2011 16th	Old Jews Telling Jokes (2010)	Sam Hoffman	Sam Hoffman, Eric Spiegelman, and full cast	HighBridge Audio	Winner	
2011 16th	Earth (The Book) (2010)	Jon Stewart and the writers of The Daily Show	Jon Stewart et al.	Hachette Audio	Finalist	
2011 16th	Paul Is Undead (2010)	Alan Goldsher	Simon Vance	Blackstone Audio	Finalist	
2011 16th	Squirrel Seeks Chipmunk (2010)	David Sedaris	David Sedaris et al.	Hachette Audio	Finalist	
2011 16th	Shit My Dad Says (2010)	Justin Halpern and Patrick Schumacker	Sean Schemmel	HarperAudio	Finalist	
2012 17th	Shatner Rules (2011)	William Shatner and Chris Regan	William Shatner	Penguin Audio	Winner	
2012 17th	Bossypants (2011)	Tina Fey	Tina Fey	Hachette Audio	Finalist	
2012 17th	Go the Fuck to Sleep (2011)	Adam Mansbach	Samuel L. Jackson	Audible/Brilliance Audio	Finalist	
2012 17th	In Fifty Years We'll All Be Chicks (2010)	Adam Carolla and Mike Lynch	Adam Carolla	Random House Audio/Books on Tape	Finalist	
2012 17th	This Is an Audiobook (based on This Is a Book; 2011)	Demetri Martin	Demetri Martin	Hachette Audio	Finalist	
2013 18th	I Suck at Girls (2012)	Justin Halpern	Sean Schemmel	HarperAudio	Winner	
2013 18th	America Again: Re-becoming the Greatness We Never Weren't (2012)	Stephen Colbert	Stephen Colbert	Hachette Audio	Finalist	
2013 18th	The Cursing Mommy's Book of Days (2012)	Ian Frazier	Cynthia Nixon	Macmillan Audio	Finalist	
2013 18th	Let's Pretend This Never Happened (2012)	Jenny Lawson	Jenny Lawson	Penguin Audio	Finalist	
2013 18th	Me the People (2012)	Kevin Bleyer	Kevin Bleyer	Random House Audio	Finalist	
2014 19th	Still Foolin' 'Em: Where I've Been, Where I'm Going, and Where the Hell Are My Keys? (2013)	Billy Crystal	Billy Crystal	Macmillan Audio	Winner	
2014 19th	How I Slept My Way to the Middle (2012)	Kevin Pollak and Alan Goldsher	Kevin Pollak	Brilliance Audio	Finalist	
2014 19th	Let's Explore Diabetes with Owls (2013)	David Sedaris	David Sedaris	Hachette Audio	Finalist	
2014 19th	Someone Could Get Hurt: A Memoir of Twenty-First-Century Parenthood (2013)	Drew Magary	Drew Magary	Penguin Audio	Finalist	
2014 19th	The Stench of Honolulu (2013)	Jack Handey	Jack Handey	Hachette Audio	Finalist	
2015 20th	Yes Please (2014)	Amy Poehler	Amy Poehler, Carol Burnett, Seth Meyers, Mike Schur, Eileen and William Poehler, Patrick Stewart, and Kathleen Turner	HarperAudio	Winner	
2015 20th	Ben Franklin Unplugged (2013)	Josh Kornbluth	Josh Kornbluth	Audible	Finalist	
2015 20th	The Disaster Artist (2013)	Greg Sestero and Tom Bissell	Greg Sestero	Tantor Audio	Finalist	
2015 20th	Food: A Love Story (2014)	Jim Gaffigan	Jim Gaffigan	Penguin Random House Audio	Finalist	
2015 20th	God Is Disappointed in You (2012)	Mark Russell and Shannon Wheeler	James Urbaniak	Audible	Finalist	
2015 20th	You Can Date Boys When You're Forty (2014)	Dave Barry	Dave Barry	Penguin Random House Audio	Finalist	
2016 21st	Furiously Happy (2015)	Jenny Lawson	Jenny Lawson	Macmillan Audio	Winner	
2016 21st	Almost Interesting (2016)	David Spade	David Spade	HarperAudio	Finalist	
2016 21st	Car Talk Classics: No Factory Recalls. So Far. (2015)	Tom Magliozzi and Ray Magliozzi	Tom Magliozzi and Ray Magliozzi	HighBridge Audio/Recorded Books	Finalist	
2016 21st	Modern Romance: An Investigation (2015)	Aziz Ansari and Eric Klinenberg	Aziz Ansari	Books on Tape/Penguin Random House Audio	Finalist	
2016 21st	Texts from Jane Eyre (2014)	Daniel M. Lavery	Amy Landon and Zach Villa	Tantor Audio	Finalist	
2016 21st	Why Not Me? (2015)	Mindy Kaling	Mindy Kaling	Books on Tape/Penguin Random House Audio	Finalist	
2017 22nd	I'm Judging You (2016)	Luvvie Ajayi	Luvvie Ajayi	Macmillan Audio	Winner	
2017 22nd	The Bassoon King (2015)	Rainn Wilson	Rainn Wilson	Penguin Random House Audio/Books on Tape	Finalist	
2017 22nd	Black Man, White House: An Oral History of the Obama Years (2017)	D. L. Hughley	Keith Szarabajka, John Reynolds, Fran Tunno, Cherise Boothe, Dan Woren, P. J. Ochlan, Gregory Itzin, Paula Jai Parker-Martin, Mia Barron, Ron Butler, and James Shippy	HarperAudio	Finalist	
2017 22nd	Life and Other Near Death Experiences (2015)	Camille Pagán	Amy McFadden	Brilliance Audio	Finalist	
2017 22nd	You Can't Touch My Hair (2016)	Phoebe Robinson	Phoebe Robinson	Penguin Random House Audio/Books on Tape	Finalist	
2017 22nd	You'll Grow Out of It (2016)	Jessi Klein	Jessi Klein	Hachette Audio	Finalist	
2018 23rd	Carpet Diem; or ...How to Save the World by Accident (2015)	Justin Lee Anderson	Matthew Lloyd Davies	Tantor Audio	Winner	
2018 23rd	The Book of Leon: Philosophy of a Fool (2017)	J. B. Smoove and Iris Bahr (as "Leon Black, as told to J. B. Smoove and Iris Bahr")	J. B. Smoove (as Leon Black)	Simon & Schuster Audio	Finalist	
2018 23rd	I Can't Make This Up (2017)	Kevin Hart and Neil Strauss	Kevin Hart	Audible	Finalist	
2018 23rd	Rhett & Link's Book of Mythicality (2017)	Rhett McLaughlin and Link Neal	Rhett McLaughlin and Link Neal	Audible	Finalist	
2018 23rd	The Totally Unscientific Study of the Search for Human Happiness (2017)	Paula Poundstone	Paula Poundstone	HighBridge Audio	Finalist	
2019 24th	The Greatest Love Story Ever Told (2018)	Nick Offerman and Megan Mullally	Nick Offerman and Megan Mullally	Penguin Random House Audio	Winner	
2019 24th	Calypso (2018)	David Sedaris	David Sedaris	Hachette Audio	Finalist	
2019 24th	Everything's Trash, But It's Okay (2018)	Phoebe Robinson	Phoebe Robinson	Penguin Random House Audio	Finalist	
2019 24th	How Not to Get Shot (2018)	D. L. Hughley	D. L. Hughley	HarperAudio	Finalist	
2019 24th	Noir (2018)	Christopher Moore	Johnny Heller	HarperAudio	Finalist	

=== 2020s ===
Year	Title	Author(s)	Narrator(s)	Publisher	Result	Ref.
2020 25th	More Bedtime Stories from Cynics (2019)	Kirsten Kearse, Gretchen Enders, Aparna Nancherla, Cirocco Dunlap, and Dave Hill	Nick Offerman, Patrick Stewart, Alia Shawkat, Elliot Page, Jane Lynch, John Waters, Anjelica Huston, Wendell Pierce, Mike Birbiglia, Rachel Dratch, Matt Walsh, Nicole Byer, Harry Goaz, Aisling Bea, and Gary Anthony Williams	Audible	Winner	
2020 25th	Dear Girls: Intimate Tales, Untold Secrets & Advice for Living Your Best Life (2019)	Ali Wong	Ali Wong and Justin Hakuta	Penguin Random House Audio	Finalist	
2020 25th	Idiot (2019)	Laura Clery	Laura Clery	Simon & Schuster Audio	Finalist	
2020 25th	Riding the Elephant: A Memoir of Altercations, Humiliations, Hallucinations, and Observations (2019)	Craig Ferguson	Craig Ferguson	Penguin Random House Audio	Finalist	
2020 25th	A Woman First: First Woman (2019)	Billy Kimball and David Mandel (as "Selina Meyer")	Julia Louis-Dreyfus (as Selina Meyer)	Penguin Random House Audio	Finalist	
2021 26th	A Very Punchable Face (2020)	Colin Jost	Colin Jost	Penguin Random House Audio	Winner	
2021 26th	The New One (2019)	Mike Birbiglia and J. Hope Stein	Mike Birbiglia and J. Hope Stein	Hachette Audio	Finalist	
2021 26th	Nothing Like I Imagined (2020)	Mindy Kaling	Mindy Kaling	Brilliance Audio	Finalist	
2021 26th	Small Doses: Potent Truths for Everyday Use (2019)	Amanda Seales	Amanda Seales	Audible Studios	Finalist	
2021 26th	Surrender, White People! (2020)	D. L. Hughley and Doug Moe	D. L. Hughley	HarperAudio	Finalist	
2021 26th	Wow, No Thank You (2020)	Samantha Irby	Samantha Irby	Penguin Random House Audio	Finalist	
2022 27th	How Y'all Doing?	Leslie Jordan	Leslie Jordan	HarperAudio	Winner	
2022 27th	Brackish Waters	Matt Boren	Christina Applegate	Audible Originals	Finalist	
2022 27th	A Carnival of Snackery	David Sedaris	David Sedaris and Tracey Ullman	Hachette Audio	Finalist	
2022 27th	The Life-Changing Science of Detecting Bullshit	John V. Petrocelli	Larry Herron	Macmillan Audio	Finalist	
2022 27th	The Seven Day Switch	Kelly Harms	Arielle DeLisle and Megan Tusing	Brilliance Publishing	Finalist	
2023 28th	Happy-Go-Lucky (2022)	David Sedaris	David Sedaris	Hachette Audio	Winner	
2023 28th	Let's Catch Up Soon	Sarah Cooper	Sarah Cooper and Felip Jeremic	Audible Originals	Finalist	
2023 28th	The Office BFFs	Jenna Fischer and Angela Kinsey	Jenna Fischer and Angela Kinsey	HarperAudio	Finalist	
2023 28th	Who Do You Think I Am?	Anjelah Johnson-Reyes	Anjelah Johnson-Reyes	Hachette Audio	Finalist	
2023 28th	The Wilder Windows	Katherine Hastings	Pamela Dillman	Flyte Publishing	Finalist	
2024 29th	Leslie F*cking Jones	Leslie Jones, foreword by Chris Rock	Leslie Jones, foreword by Chris Rock	Hachette Audio	Winner	
2024 29th	How to Survive History	Cody Cassidy	Dennis Boutsikaris	Penguin Random House Audio	Finalist	
2024 29th	Uncle of the Year	Andrew Rannells	Andrew Rannells	Penguin Random House Audio	Finalist	
2024 29th	No One Leaves the Castle	Christopher Healy	Jessica Almasy	HarperAudio	Finalist	
2024 29th	Raw Dog: The Naked Truth About Hot Dogs	Jamie Loftus	Jamie Loftus	Macmillan Audio	Finalist	
2025 30th	The Millicent Quibb School of Etiquette for Young Ladies of Mad Science	Kate McKinnon	Kate McKinnon and Emily Lynne	Hachette Audio	Winner	
2025 30th	Erasure (2001)	Percival Everett	Sean Crisden	Tantor Audio	Finalist	
2025 30th	Glory Days	Simon Rich	John Mulaney	Hachette Audio	Finalist	
2025 30th	Joyful Recollections of Trauma	Paul Scheer	Paul Scheer	HarperAudio	Finalist	
2025 30th	Wilder Widows Walk on the Wilder Side	Katherine Hastings	Pamela Dillman	Flyte Publishing	Finalist	
