= Three Times Carlin =

Three Times Carlin: An Orgy of George
- Author: George Carlin
- Language: English
- Genre: Humor
- Publisher: Hyperion
- Publication date: October 31, 2006
- Publication place: United States
- Media type: Print
- Pages: 896
- ISBN: 9781401302436
- Preceded by: When Will Jesus Bring the Pork Chops?
- Followed by: Last Words

Three Times Carlin: An Orgy of George is a compilation of the three major books by George Carlin. It was released in October 2006. The three included books are Brain Droppings, Napalm and Silly Putty, and When Will Jesus Bring the Pork Chops? in order of release. Sometimes a Little Brain Damage Can Help was not included.

It also includes about 30 pages of previously unreleased material, a portion of which later appeared on his album Life Is Worth Losing.

The paperback book comes in a cardboard slipcase.
