= List of Angelo State University people =

This list includes notable alumni, faculty, and former students of Angelo State University.

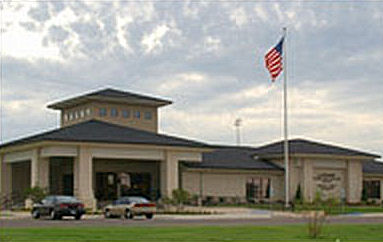
Angelo State Alumni Center

== Arts and entertainment ==
- Sohini Alam (born 1978), British Bangladeshi singer
- Rupert Boneham, contestant on reality TV shows Survivor: Pearl Islands, Survivor: Heroes vs. Villains, Survivor: Blood vs. Water and Survivor: All-Stars; voted a fan favorite and won a million dollar prize; 2012 Libertarian Party candidate for governor of Indiana
- Luci Christian, American Anime Awards-nominated voice actress (Full Metal Panic!, Dragon Ball Z: Ultimate Tenkaichi, Dance Dance Revolution Universe)
- Bill Erwin, Emmy Award-nominated actor (The Andy Griffith Show, The West Wing, Seinfeld, My Name Is Earl)
- Ben Garrison, political cartoonist and artist
- Jenny Lawson, blogger and author of the #1 New York Times best seller Let's Pretend This Never Happened
- Ilan Mitchell-Smith, actor (The Wild Life, Weird Science); Angelo State professor
- Lucy A. Snyder, author, Bram Stoker Award winner 2010
- David Trevino, Grammy Award winner 2008; musician, Little Joe y La Familia

== Athletics ==
- Colby Carthel, head football coach at Texas A&M University–Commerce
- Gary Gaines, head football coach of Permian High School football team, the focus of the book Friday Night Lights: A Town, a Team, and a Dream, the film Friday Night Lights, and the subsequent NBC TV show loosely based on the book and movie; head coach of Abilene Christian University; coach at Texas Tech University
- Alvin Garrett, NFL receiver for the Washington Redskins; played in Super Bowl XVII
- Tranel Hawkins, Olympic hurdler
- Pierce Holt, NFL defensive lineman for the San Francisco 49ers; played in Super Bowl XXIII, Super Bowl XXIV, and NFL Pro Bowl
- Mike Jinks, head football coach at Bowling Green University
- Chris Jones (born 1993), basketball player for Maccabi Tel Aviv of the Israeli Basketball Premier League
- Tramain Jones, former football defensive back who played in the Arena Football League
- Ken Kennard, NFL defensive lineman for the Houston Oilers
- Jim Morris, MLB player for the Tampa Bay Devil Rays; inspiration for the film The Rookie
- Glen Sefcik, sprint and hurdles coach for the Saudi Arabian Olympic team; head track coach at Wayland Baptist University, Stephen F. Austin State University and Texas A&M University–Kingsville
- Grant Teaff, head football coach, Baylor University, Angelo State; ranked 33rd all-time winningest football coach in NCAA Division I; inducted into the College Football Hall of Fame in 2001
- Wylie Turner, NFL defensive back for the Green Bay Packers
- Clayton Weishuhn, NFL linebacker for the New England Patriots and Green Bay Packers, Super Bowl XX
- Charlie West, NFL safety for the Minnesota Vikings; played in Super Bowl IV

== Business and nonprofit ==
- A. Mario Castillo, president of Aegis Group; chief of staff, United States House Committee on Agriculture; named one of the "Top 25 Hispanic Leaders in the United States" by the U.S. Congressional Hispanic Caucus
- Houston Harte, founder of Harte-Hanks; consultant to President Lyndon B. Johnson
- Alvin New, CEO of Town & Country Food Stores, Stripes Convenience Stores; San Angelo mayor
- Albert Reyes, CEO of Buckner International; president of Baptist University of the Américas

== Government ==
- Troy Fraser, Texas Senate, 24th District
- Mark Homer, Texas House of Representatives, District 3
- Robert Junell, Texas House of Representatives, chairman of the House Appropriations Committee
- Morris Overstreet, judge, Texas Court of Criminal Appeals; judge for Potter County Court at Law No. 1; prosecutor in the 47th Judicial District; general counsel to the Texas State Baptist Convention; distinguished visiting professor at Thurgood Marshall School of Law; first African-American official elected to statewide office in Texas history
- J.T. Rutherford, United States representative, Texas's 16th congressional district

== Military ==
- Matthew O. Williams, serving in the U.S. Army since his graduation in 2005, Medal of Honor recipient for actions during the Battle of Shok Valley in Afghanistan

== Journalism ==
- Arnold Garcia, editorial editor, Austin American-Statesman; served as both a juror and as a chair of a jury for the Pulitzer Prize
- Rena Penderson, editorial page editor at The Dallas Morning News for 16 years; finalist for the Pulitzer Prize; named one of the "Most Powerful Women in Texas" by Texas Monthly, director of communications, American College of Education; Senior Advisor, Department of State
- Satcha Pretto, CNN correspondent; anchor of Despierta America on Univision Television Network - Miami
- Renay San Miguel, former CNBC reporter; MarketWatch; anchor of Headline News

== Science and education ==
- Robert Nason Beck, founder of Center for Imaging Science, University of Chicago
- Dr. Billy Mac Jones, president of Texas State University and Memphis State University
- Ruth J. Person, chancellor of University of Michigan-Flint; president of Indiana University Kokomo
- Rajesh Rao, director of NSF Center for Sensorimotor Neural Engineering; professor of Computer Science and Engineering, University of Washington
