= Wall High School =

Wall High School may refer to:

- Wall High School (New Jersey) — Wall, New Jersey
- Wall High School (South Dakota) — Wall, South Dakota
- Wall High School (Texas) — Wall, Texas
