= Pati Yang =

Polish singer-songwriter

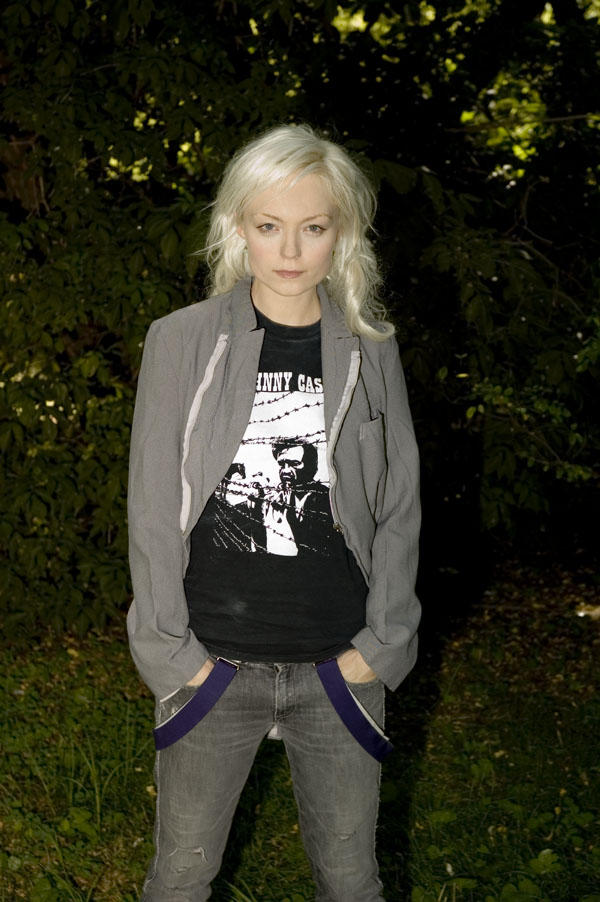
- Pati Yang in 2006

Background information
- Born: Patrycja Grzymałkiewicz; March 26, 1980 (age 46)
- Origin: Wrocław, Poland
- Genres: Electronic, trip hop
- Occupation: Singer
- Years active: 1998–present
- Labels: Sony Music Entertainment Poland, EMI Music Poland

Patrycja Vernhes (née Grzymałkiewicz; born March 26, 1980), known professionally as Pati Yang, is a Polish singer-songwriter. Over the course of her musical career, Yang has directed or contributed to a number of high-profile musical projects, from her solo project, which has released 4 LPs and 4 EPs, to the 13 film soundtracks she has appeared on, including Michael Winterbottom’s A Mighty Heart and Code 46, Richard Jobson’s New Town Killers and The Journey, and Hattie Dalton’s Third Star.

== Career ==
Born in Poland in 1980, Pati Yang spent much of the first 7 years of her life on tour with her stepfather’s iconic rock band, Lady Pank, whose overt opposition to Communism and Soviet influence made it a cultural cornerstone throughout Poland in the 1980s and the subject of government-sanctioned censorship. At the age of 16, she left Poland and arrived in London with the intention of studying and writing music. Her debut album, Jaszczurka, was released by Sony Music Poland in 1998 to critical and commercial success.

In 2001, she formed a musical duo with Stephen Dean Hilton, called Children. Based out of London, Children released their first EP on Mercury Records, and were covered in The Independent’s 2001 roundup of new electronic experimental artists. As her work with Hilton continued, Yang also appeared on David Holmes’s soundtrack for Code 46, which was nominated for Best Soundtrack at the 2004 European Film Awards.

In 2005, she released the LP Silent Treatment, the followup to her debut solo album. Recorded at Air Studios in London, Silent Treatment raised Yang’s public profile tremendously – the album peaked at No. 14 on the charts in Poland and earned her a Fryderyk nomination for Best Pop Album of the Year. Shortly after, on June 9th, 2006, she was opening for Depeche Mode in Warsaw at Legia Stadium.

Meanwhile, Yang and Stephen Dean Hilton continued collaborating under a new moniker, FlyKKiller. Under this name, they released their first album, Experiments in Violent Light, in 2007. The self-titled single received praise from various UK-based music publications, including DMC World Magazine, NME, DJ Mag, and Hip Hop Connection. The single was proclaimed “Single of the Week” by BBC 6 Music, and FlyKKiller was featured in two BBC live sessions. Times Magazine named FlyKKiller the “Second Most Important Breakthrough Act” of 2007.

In 2009, Yang's third album, Faith, Hope + Fury, produced by Stephen Dean Hilton, was released to critical and commercial success, topping the charts in Poland at No. 25. Her next album, Wires and Sparks, was produced by Manchester-based musician Joe Cross, who is most known for his work with artists such as Alex Metric, Hurts, and The Courteneers. The album, released in 2011, received attention from BBC 6 Music, DJ Magazine, and Mixmag. Wires and Sparks topped the Polish charts at No. 38.

Today, Pati resides in the Mojave Desert, where she studies Native American medicine and sound healing techniques. Under the name Patricia Vernhes, she devotes much of her energy to installation and sculptural art, paintings, and sound art. Noirmoutier, her experimental audio project with Nicolas Vernhes, “utilizes a variety of instruments, including a set of 20 binaurally tuned quartz bowls, synthesizers and analog tape delays, to create auditory experiences inspired by the laws of sound, hallucinatory resonance, and sound therapy.” Yang also practices as a Yoga instructor, Reiki Master, and Ayurveda Yoga Therapist. In 2015, she founded Mojave Desert Skin Shield, a small business based out of Joshua Tree, California, that produces sustainable self-care products.

== Discography ==
=== Studio albums ===
Title	Album details	Peak chart positions
Title	Album details	POL
Jaszczurka	Released: October 12, 1998; Label: Sony Music Entertainment Poland; Formats: CD	—
Silent Treatment	Released: October 1, 2005; Label: EMI Music Poland; Formats: CD, digital download	14
Faith, Hope + Fury	Released: March 27, 2009; Label: EMI Music Poland; Formats: CD, digital download	25
Wires and Sparks	Released: May 7, 2011; Label: EMI Music Poland; Formats: CD	38
"—" denotes a recording that did not chart or was not released in that territory.

=== EPs ===
Title	EPs details
Hold Your Horses	Released: September 17, 2012; Label: Godmama Records; Formats: CD, digital download

=== Music videos ===
Title	Year	Directed	Album	Ref.
"Jaszczurka"	1998	Piotr Rzepliński	Jaszczurka	
"All That is Thirst"	2005	—	Silent Treatment	
"Stories From Dogland"	2009	—	Faith, Hope + Fury	
"Timebomb"	2010	—	Faith, Hope + Fury	
"Near to God"	2011	—	Wires and Sparks	
"Hold Your Horses"	2012	—	Wires and Sparks	
"High Heels" (Justyna Steczkowska feat. Pati Yang)	2015	—	Anima (by Justyna Steczkowska)	
