= Clayton Weishuhn =

American football player (1959–2022)

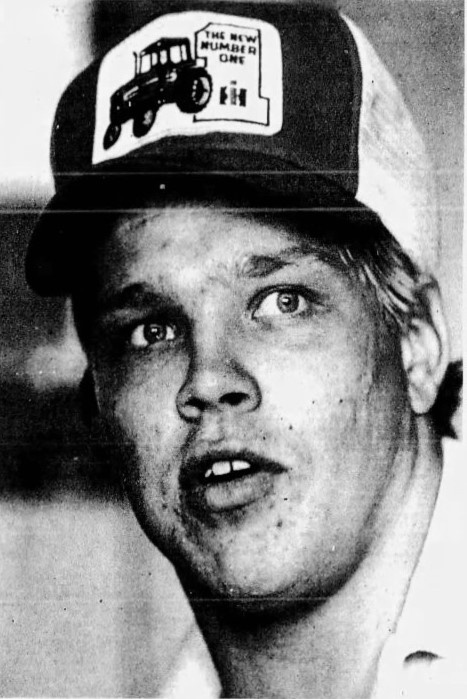
- Weishuhn in 1982, San Angelo Standard

No. 53, 51
- Position: Linebacker

Personal information
- Born: October 7, 1959; San Angelo, Texas, U.S.
- Died: April 22, 2022 (aged 62); Wall, Texas, U.S.
- Listed height: 6 ft 2 in (1.88 m)
- Listed weight: 220 lb (100 kg)

Career information
- High school: Wall (TX)
- College: Angelo State
- NFL draft: 1982: 3rd round, 60th overall pick

Career history
- New England Patriots (1982–1986); Green Bay Packers (1987)

Career NFL statistics
- Sacks: 4
- Fumble recoveries: 4
- Stats at Pro Football Reference

Clayton Charles Weishuhn (October 7, 1959 – April 22, 2022) was an American professional football player who played linebacker for five seasons in the National Football League (NFL). He played for the New England Patriots and Green Bay Packers from 1982 to 1987. He had earlier played college football at Angelo State University. He established the Patriots' single-season record of 229 tackles in 1983, and still held the record at the time of his death from a car accident in April 2022.

== Early life and college ==
Weishuhn was born in San Angelo, Texas, on October 7, 1959. He was the third of five children of Olen Weishuhn and Merline (Michalewicz). Weishuhn grew up on a cotton farm, and attended Wall High School. There, he was a standout American football player, and played tailback and linebacker on the school's defense-oriented team that went 13–1 during the 1977 season, with the Hawks recording six shutouts and allowing 4.5 points per game before progressing to the semifinals of the Class 1A state championship. He then studied physical education and history at Angelo State University, and played college football for the Angelo State Rams from 1978 to 1981.

During his freshman year, Weishuhn was a member of the Rams team that finished 14–0 and won the 1978 NAIA Football National Championship. As of 2026, this remains the school's only perfect season, as well as its only national title. He later received All-American honors and was selected to the All-LSC first-team during his last three seasons with the school. He was also named Lone Star Conference Lineman of the Year in both 1980 and 1981. Weishuhn established school records for most career tackles (523) and tackles in a single season (173). His head coach, Jim Hess, later recounted that Weishuhn "was the best I ever coached".

Weishuhn was inducted into Angelo State's Hall of Honor in 2006. Three years later, he was recognized as a distinguished alumnus by the school's alumni association. He was enshrined into the Lone Star Conference Hall of Honor in 2013.

== Professional career ==
Weishuhn was selected by the New England Patriots in the third round (60th overall selection) of the 1982 NFL draft. He subsequently signed with the franchise in mid-July of that year. He made his NFL debut with the Patriots on September 12, 1982, at the age of 22, in a 24–13 win over the Baltimore Colts. He started 9 games during his first season, recording two sacks and one fumble recovered. One of these sacks came against the Miami Dolphins on December 12, 1982, which prevented them from attempting a field goal near the end of the first half and ultimately helped the Patriots to a narrow 3–0 victory, in a matchup that became known as the Snowplow Game. He started all 16 games the following year, registering 27 return yards, 2 sacks, 3 fumbles recovered, and finished ninth in the league in interception returns for touchdown (1). He also established the franchise record of 229 tackles in a single season, which still stood at the time of his death. He had 21 tackles in a 7–0 win over the New Orleans Saints on December 4, 1983, that was played in the sleet and snow.

During the first week of the 1984 season, Weishuhn suffered a severe knee injury, which rendered him unable to play for the rest of that season, as well as the entirety of the 1985 season. He consequently missed the Patriots' first appearance at the Super Bowl in 1985, in which they lost 46–10 to the Chicago Bears. He returned for the 1986 season, yet within four games, suffered both a hamstring and groin injury, again causing him to miss the remainder of the team's games that season. Weishuhn was then traded to the Green Bay Packers, where he played in nine games for the 1987 season, before retiring from football at the age of 27. During his five-season NFL career, Weishuhn registered four sacks, one touchdown, and made four fumble recoveries in 39 games played.

== Personal life ==
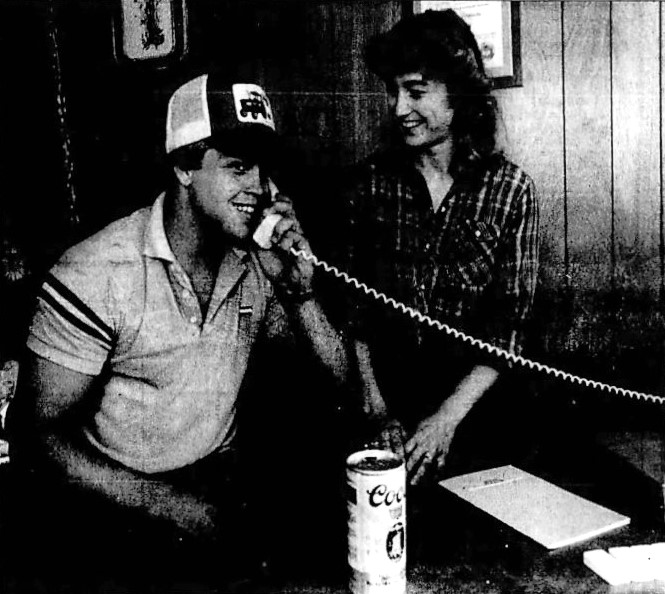
Weishuhn and his wife, Diane, after the Patriots player draft in 1982, San Angelo Standard

Weishuhn married Diane Mikulik on August 2, 1980. They met together in high school and remained married for over 40 years until his death. Together, they had three children: Brandi, Shannon, and Lauren, who played for the Angelo State Rambelles basketball team.

After retiring from professional football, Weishuhn went back to his hometown of Wall and resumed cotton farming. He also served on his alma mater's Athletic Association Board of Directors.

== Death ==
On April 22, 2022, Weishuhn was involved in a single-vehicle traffic collision near Wall. Weishuhn, the driver and sole occupant of the car, was found unconscious and not wearing a seat belt inside the car wreckage. He was pronounced dead at the scene. He was 62 years old. His funeral was held four days later, on April 26, at a Catholic church in his hometown.

== See also ==
- List of people who died in traffic collisions
- List of American football players
