= Silent Treatment (Pati Yang album) =

Studio album by Pati Yang
- Released: October 1, 2005
- Genre: Electronic, trip hop
- Length: 45:30
- Label: EMI Music Poland
- Producer: Stephen Hilton

Pati Yang chronology
Jaszczurka (1998)	Silent Treatment (2005)	Faith, Hope + Fury (2009)

Singles from Silent Treatment
- 1. "All That Is Thirst" Released: 2005; 2. "Reverse The Day" Released: 2005

Silent Treatment – the second studio album by Polish trip hop singer Pati Yang. The album was released by EMI Music Poland on 1 October 2005.

The album was nominated for the Fryderyk awards 2005 in category "Album of the Year – Pop".

== Track listing ==
No.	Title	Length
1.	"Soul For Me"	4:02
2.	"Reverse The Day"	4:08
3.	"All That Is Thirst"	3:47
4.	"Unquiet"	3:33
5.	"Pretty Fin (Keith Tenniswood Remix)"	3:31
6.	"19:53 North West"	4:12
7.	"Giant Cat Woman"	4:02
8.	"Switch Off The Sun"	3:31
9.	"1986"	4:53
10.	"Air Stands Still"	5:12
11.	"Easy Flow"	4:39
