= Daniel Klein =

Daniel Klein may refer to:

- Danny Klein (born 1946), American bassist
- Daniel B. Klein (born 1962), professor of economics at George Mason University
- Daniel Klein (grammarian) (1609–1666), medieval scholar of the Lithuanian language
- Daniel Martin Klein (born 1939), American author
- Dan Klein (born 1976), American professor of computer science at the University of California, Berkeley
- Daniel Klein (footballer) (born 2001), German professional footballer
