= Faith, Hope + Fury =

Studio album by Pati Yang
- Released: 27 April 2009
- Genre: Electronic
- Length: 43:12
- Label: EMI Music Poland
- Producer: Stephen Hilton

Pati Yang chronology
| Silent Treatment (2005) | Faith, Hope + Fury (2009) | Wires and Sparks (2011) |

Faith, Hope and Fury is the third studio album by Polish trip hop singer Pati Yang. The album was released by EMI Music Poland on 27 April 2009.

== Track listing ==
| No. | Title | Length |
|---|---|---|
| 1. | "Summer of Tears" | 4:22 |
| 2. | "The Boy in Your Eyes" | 4:04 |
| 3. | "Stories From Dogland" | 3:59 |
| 4. | "Over" | 3:41 |
| 5. | "Supernatural" | 3:40 |
| 6. | "Red Hot Black" | 3:34 |
| 7. | "Timebomb" | 3:28 |
| 8. | "A Little Wrong" | 3:52 |
| 9. | "Strange Friends" | 3:43 |
| 10. | "Outside" | 4:16 |
| 11. | "Coming Home" | 4:33 |
