= Glen Sefcik =

American athletics coach

Glen Sefcik (born April 27, 1950) is an American former international and national decathlon, sprints, and hurdles coach, collegiate coach, author, lecturer, and higher education advocate. In 1980, Sefcik served as a sprint and hurdles coach for the Saudi Arabian Olympic Team. During his career, Sefcik has held positions as head coach for four universities.

== Early life ==
Sefcik was born in San Angelo, Texas, to Alvin and Leona Sefcik, and has one sibling, Wayne Sefcik. A native of Wall, Texas, and Sefcik was an outstanding three sport high school athlete and pursued a collegiate athletic career. An injury forced Sefcik to discontinue athletic participation and accepted a position as a student manager for the University of Texas Track and Field team. Sefcik went on to become a student assistant coach his senior year and was awarded letterman status in Track & Field. Sefcik completed his degree in Kinesiology at the University of Texas at Austin and began his coaching career. He later pursued a Master of the Arts in Teaching at Angelo State University.

== Career ==
After serving as the US National Coach for the USA vs. Germany Decathlon, Sefcik coached the Saudi national and Olympic team to win three golds and two silvers at alternative competition, Islamic Games—held as result of boycott of Russian Olympic Games. Sefcik also trained teams in Tunisia, Egypt, and Turkey.

Prior to accepting the Olympic position for the Saudi Arabian Federation Sefcik coached the Eastern New Mexico University’s track team to a third-place finish in the NAIA National Championships. Following his international experience, Sefcik joined Wayland Baptist University as Head Track Coach and professor in the Kinesiology Department. While at Wayland his team finished fourth in the national championships and produced numerous national champions. Sefcik later went on to coach and teach at Stephen F. Austin State University, with three Southland Conference Team Championships, a fourth-place finish in the NCAA II Indoor National Championships in 1984, and numerous All-Americans. During this time Sefcik served as the Executive Director of USA Track & Field - Florida Association and was Chairman for the USA Track & Field Coaching Education Committee responsible for developing the Level III Certification program as well as curricular revisions of its educational programs. Sefcik retired from coaching after a two-year coaching position at Texas A&M Kingsville to accept a position at the University of Phoenix. Sefcik currently teaches and is the College Campus Chairman for the Humanities Department at the University of Phoenix, Austin Campus. In addition, he is a certified life coach for the True Growth Academy and World Class Coaches’ organizations. Coach Sefcik has individually coached Colonels and Command Sergeant Majors at the Pre-Command Course for the US Army in leadership and development as well as leaders in the insurance and Federal Emergency Management Agency (FEMA)

== Dimensional Hierarchy, 1983 ==
As a result of many years of extensive research in developing human performance, Sefcik has developed a model of achieving one’s full potential by balancing and coordinating the energy levels in nine dimension of one’s lifestyle. This system provides a variety of leadership coaching tools, techniques, best practices, and case studies from analysis of peak performers in life that transfer into effective personal leadership development. The system includes two parametric assessments designed to identify one’s strengths and developmental areas that are the basis for learning how to process one’s talents into refining an ability to lead an organization to “Peak Performance.”

== Personal life ==
Glen Sefcik resides in Corpus Christi, Texas. He has two grown children and two grandchildren. Justin & Whitney. Daughter in law, Emily (Ermin) Sefcik and granddaughters Lillian and Eveland.

== Presentations and published works ==
- 1980: Sefcik presented proposals to high-ranking government officials of the Kingdom of Saudi Arabia who served on the Saudi Arabian Amateur Athletic Association.
- 1996: Sefcik made a presentation to the International Track & Field Coaches Association at the Olympic Games in Atlanta, Georgia.
- 1996: Sefcik was selected by the U.S. Olympic Committee as chief of the U.S. delegation to deliver a presentation to the International Olympic Academy in Greece. The topic, “Dimensional Hierarchy: Olympic Dimensions,” centered on goal setting, with meaningful applications to business and industry, as well as athletics.
- Sefcik has delivered hundreds of presentations to undergraduate and graduate students in the disciplines of communication, sports psychology, health, and kinesiology.
- Sefcik served on the USATF Decathlon Committee and was on the Visa Gold Coaching staff.
- Guest lecturer for the Texas, New Mexico, Ohio, Oklahoma, Louisiana, & New Jersey High School Track Coaching Associations over his coaching career.
