= Is Everyone Hanging Out Without Me? =

Memoir by Mindy Kaling

Is Everyone Hanging Out Without Me? (And Other Concerns)
- Author: Mindy Kaling
- Working title: The Contents of My Purse
- Language: English
- Genre: Memoir
- Published: November 1, 2011
- Publisher: Crown Publishing Group
- Publication place: United States
- Pages: 420
- ISBN: 978-0307886279
- Followed by: Why Not Me?

Is Everyone Hanging Out Without Me? (And Other Concerns) is a 2011 memoir by writer and actress Mindy Kaling. The book was on the New York Times Bestsellers list for 5 weeks.

== Background ==
In 2010 Crown Publishing Group announced that it acquired a book from Kaling, and described it as a cross between the Nora Ephron play Love, Loss and What I Wore and Kaling's blog "Things I've Bought That I Love." The book was originally titled The Contents of My Purse.

== Synopsis ==
Kaling tells stories from her life and details her observations about love, friendship, Hollywood, dieting, her relationship with her mother, among other things.

== Reception ==
Jen Chaney of The Washington Post called the book "a breezy, intermittently amusing and somewhat unfocused first essay collection."
