= Wall Independent School District =

School district in Texas

Coordinates: 31°22′25″N 100°18′23″W

Wall Independent School District is a public school district based in the community of Wall, Tom Green County, Texas (USA).

Wall ISD has three campuses

- Wall High (Grades 9-12)
- Wall Middle (Grades 6-8)
- Wall Elementary (Grades PK-5)

In 2009, the school district was rated "recognized" by the Texas Education Agency.
