= Wires and Sparks =

Studio album by Pati Yang
- Released: 17 May 2011
- Genre: Electronic
- Length: 49:01
- Label: EMI Music Poland
- Producer: Joe Cross

Pati Yang chronology
Faith, Hope + Fury (2009)	Wires and Sparks (2011)

Wires and Sparks is the fourth studio album by Polish singer-songwriter Pati Yang. Produced by Joseph Cross, the album was released by EMI Music Poland on 17 May 2011. An EP under the same name is set for release in UK on 9 April through Godmama Records .

== Track listing ==
No.	Title	Length
1.	"Let It Go"	4:30
2.	"Near To God"	4:16
3.	"Hold Your Horses"	4:39
4.	"Kiss It Better"	4:39
5.	"Breaking Waves"	4:51
6.	"Revolution Baby"	4:48
7.	"Darling"	5:09
8.	"Take A While"	5:59
9.	"Wires And Sparks"	4:39
10.	"Fold"	5:31
