= Jaszczurka =

Studio album by Pati Yang
- Released: June 1, 1998
- Genre: Trip hop, downtempo, electronic rock, drum and bass, nu jazz
- Length: 47:02
- Label: Sony Music Poland

Pati Yang chronology
Jaszczurka (1998)	Silent Treatment (2005)

Singles from Jaszczurka
- 1. "Jaszczurka" Released: 1998; 2. "Underlegend" Released: 1999

Jaszczurka (meaning "lizard" in Polish) is the first studio album by Polish trip hop singer Pati Yang. The album was released by Sony Music Poland on 1 June 1998.

== Track listing ==
No.	Title	Length
1.	"Si"	4:53
2.	"3 Pati"	3:18
3.	"Jaszczurka"	3:50
4.	"Uwolnij"	3:33
5.	"Aooh"	3:02
6.	"Higher Perception"	4:11
7.	"Underlegend"	5:10
8.	"Nie wróci"	4:36
9.	"Może zapomni"	3:48
10.	"Too Late"	5:45
11.	"Empty Temple"	4:56
