= Third Star =

- UK poster
- Directed by: Hattie Dalton
- Written by: Vaughan Sivell
- Produced by: Kelly Broad, Vaughan Sivell
- Starring: Benedict Cumberbatch; JJ Feild; Tom Burke; Adam Robertson; Hugh Bonneville
- Cinematography: Carlos Catalán
- Edited by: Peter Christelis
- Music by: Stephen Hilton
- Release date: June 2010 (Edinburgh Film Festival)
- Running time: 92 minutes
- Country: United Kingdom
- Language: English

Third Star is a 2010 British drama film directed by Hattie Dalton and starring Benedict Cumberbatch, JJ Feild, Tom Burke, Adam Robertson, and Hugh Bonneville. It premiered at the Edinburgh Film Festival in June 2010, where it was shown as the closing film, and was released in the United Kingdom on 20 May 2011.

== Plot ==
After celebrating his 29th and - as everyone including himself knows - last birthday, James, a young man terminally ill with cancer, sets out on a last hiking trip with his three best friends, Davy, Bill and Miles. Their destination is James's favourite beach at Barafundle Bay, on the Pembrokeshire coast.

Davy has been unemployed and helping James's family care for James. Bill is associated with an oppressive relationship that he is reportedly attempting to end. Miles, recently absent from James's life, is a businessman and the son of a novelist who died of cancer during Miles's childhood. James and Miles maintained a close friendship that involved rivalry as aspiring writers. James is physically weak, uses a special cart, and requires physical assistance from his companions, alongside liquid morphine and other medications administered at increasing frequency to manage chronic pain and symptoms. Having been ill for years, James is approaching death, experiencing both acceptance of his condition and distress regarding the duration and achievements of his life.

Traveling over the rugged and isolated coastal terrain, the young men fool around having light-hearted, juvenile fun to give James the time of his life. They also encounter various odd persons and situations and are faced with a series of setbacks and accidents, including loss of various supplies and finally the cart. Everyone's nerves and patience are sorely tested by James's outbursts at each of his friends in turn: out partly of premeditation and partly of spontaneous pain-induced anger, he seems to attempt to shake them out of mediocrity, settling for things and excessive unselfishness and into making what they actually want out of the lives they still have ahead. Davy is mortified by James's observations; Bill reveals that his girlfriend is pregnant and while he knows that they are not right for each other, he can't and won't leave her; Miles counters James's attacks with equally brutal honesty regarding James himself. Eventually James and Miles come to reveal the guilty secrets each has kept from the other. James found and read a novel manuscript Miles finished years ago without ever telling anyone, and has been jealous ever since but also impressed by Miles's talent. Miles has kept away from James lately because he has been unable and unwilling to cope with his best friend's illness, but he is in love and sleeping with James's married sister, and she and her children will soon come to live with Miles – something he did not intend James ever to know.

On the night they finally arrive at Barafundle Bay, James reveals the true purpose of the trip: he plans to drown himself in the sea before pain takes his life over completely. He asks his friends to let him do so and tell his family and the police that they woke up in the morning and found his body in the water. Horrified at the thought, they refuse; however, after temporarily losing James's morphine supply and witnessing him struggle with severe pain, they change their minds.

In the morning, James swims out with his friends keeping him company, and eventually Miles helps James drown himself near the shore and brings his body back.

== Cast ==
- Benedict Cumberbatch as James
- Tom Burke as Davy
- JJ Feild as Miles
- Adam Robertson as Bill
- Hugh Bonneville as the beachcomber
- Rupert Frazer as Mr.
- Helen Griffin as Mrs.

== Reception ==
The Observer's Philip French called the film "competent", though "rather familiar and predictable, though not dislikable". The Santa Monica Daily Press's Cynthia Citron called it "an absorbing, moving, and captivating experience". The Guardian's Phelim O'Neill described it as "picaresque and directionless for quite some time, only falling into focus in the final furlong".
