= When Will Jesus Bring the Pork Chops? =

2004 book by George Carlin

- Front Cover
- Author: George Carlin
- Language: English
- Genre: Humor
- Publisher: Hyperion
- Publication date: October 12, 2004
- Media type: Hardcover; Paperback; Audiobook
- Pages: 300
- ISBN: 978-1-4013-0134-7
- OCLC: 56611832
- Dewey Decimal: 792.23 22
- LC Class: PN6165 .C36 2004
- Preceded by: Napalm and Silly Putty
- Followed by: Three Times Carlin: An Orgy of George

When Will Jesus Bring the Pork Chops? (2004) is the fourth and penultimate book written by George Carlin. He came up with the title because it offends all of the Abrahamic religions (Christianity, Judaism, and Islam). The book at first was not sold at Wal-Mart because its cover, which portrays Da Vinci's The Last Supper, depicted Carlin sitting next to the empty seat of Jesus. It is the third book by Carlin, the previous ones being Napalm and Silly Putty (2001) and Brain Droppings (1997). It was followed by the posthumous publication in 2009 of his "sortabiography" Last Words.

This book is for the most part written in the same style of Carlin's other books, but with some notable thematic differences. In general, the tone of the book is darker and more critical than his previous books in terms of its outlook on politics and society. Also, much of the book is focused on euphemisms, both as used in advertising and in politically correct language. The book also incorporates much of Carlin's standup material from across his career, taking segments from his most recent shows, as well as many of his very early performances.

An audiobook version of When Will Jesus Bring the Pork Chops?, read by Carlin, was released at the same time as the book.
