= Laura Clery =

American actress and comedian (born 1986)

- Born: Laura Marie Clery; July 22, 1986 (age 40); Downers Grove, Illinois, U.S.A.
- Occupations: Actress; comedian; writer; social media personality
- Spouse: Stephen Hilton (m. 2013; div. 2023)
- Children: 2

Laura Marie Clery (born July 22, 1986) is an American actor, comedian, and social media personality. She gained prominence through her comedic sketches and characters on platforms like Facebook and YouTube. She has also ventured into traditional acting roles and has appeared in television shows and films. Clery has a YouTube channel where she shares vlogs, sketches, and other content.

== Early life ==
Clery was born on July 22, 1986, in Downers Grove, a suburb of Chicago, Illinois. She grew up in Downers Grove and spent much of her childhood there before pursuing her career in entertainment. She moved to Los Angeles after graduating high school to pursue a career in acting.

== Career ==
Frustrated with her acting career, Clery uploaded original material to YouTube in 2015. In 2017, she succeeded with Facebook, where she was an early participant in their revenue-sharing program. Clery directed, wrote, and starred in the three episodes "The Laura Clery Project", a Comedy Central channel on Snapchat.

In 2019, Clery published a book chronicling her personal life titled Idiot. It was nominated for an Audie Award for Humor in 2020. It was followed by Idiots: Marriage, Motherhood, Milk & Mistakes in 2022.

As of January 2026, Clery has more than 14 million followers on Facebook, 3.1 million on Instagram, and 7.6 million on TikTok.

== Philanthropy ==
After her struggles with addiction, Clery advocates for addiction recovery. She has attention deficit disorder.

== Personal life ==
Clery married Stephen Hilton in 2012. Hilton frequently appeared in her videos. They have two children.

In August 2022, Clery and her husband separated, and their divorce was finalized in 2023.

In May 2026, Clery suffered nonfatal injuries in a freak accident after being crushed by her refrigerator. The refrigerator was insufficiently mounted to the wall and fell after Clery's seven-year-old son climbed on top and dislodged the appliance. Clery was pinned under the 600-pound fridge against a kitchen counter and began to suffocate. She was able to call 911 using the phone in her pocket. She suffered no broken bones but received 'serious injuries'.

== Filmography ==
FilmTelevision
Year	Title	Role	Notes
2012	Two Jacks	Ann	
2014	The Longest Week	Bunny	
	Title	Role	Notes
2008	'Til Death	Allison Stark	
2009	Disaster Date	Various	
2013	2 Broke Girls	Wren	Season 2, Episode 18
2013	Hungry	Laura	Also Writer
TBA	The Nanny		

== Bibliography ==
- Clery, Laura (2019). Idiot: Life Stories from the Creator of Help Helen Smash. New York: Gallery Books. ISBN 978-1982101954.
- Clery, Laura (2022). Idiots: Marriage, Motherhood, Milk & Mistakes. New York: Gallery Books. ISBN 978-1982167103.
