= Matthew Lloyd Davies =

British voice actor

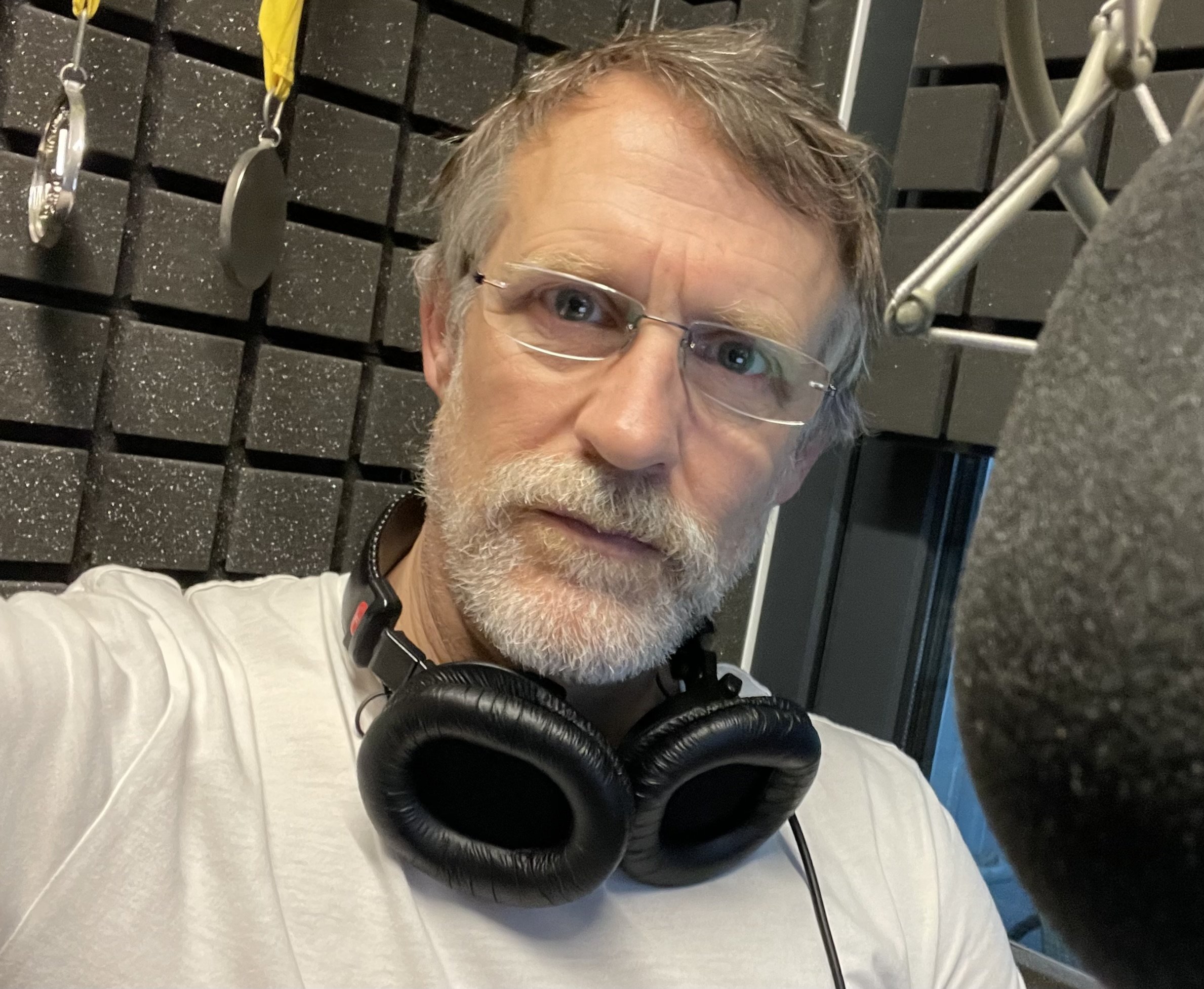
- Education: Bristol Old Vic Theatre School
- Occupations: Theatre and voice actor
- Notable work: Forget Me Not Lane as Frank's younger self (1990); Cider with Rosie as Laurie Lee's younger self (1991); Black Chiffon as Roy; The Importance of Being Earnest as Algernon (1997); Dracula as Jack Seward (2000); A Spy's Life (Audiobook narrator); The Madness of King George as Papendiek
- Awards: 2018 Audie Award for Humor - Carpet Diem: Or...How to Save the World by Accident; 2022 Audie Award for Fiction (jointly) – The Final Revival of Opal and Nev; 2022 AudioFile Best of the Year Award for Mystery and Suspense – A Spy's Life
- Website: official website

Matthew Lloyd Davies is a British theatre and voice actor. Trained at the Bristol Old Vic Theatre School; Lloyd Davies has appeared in theatrical productions directed by Terry Hands, Jonathan Holloway, and Nicholas Hytner; and narrated audiobooks by Henry Porter and Dawnie Walton. He won the Audio Publishers Association 2018 Audie Award for Humour and jointly won the 2022 Audie Award for Fiction.

== Career ==
=== Theatre ===
In 1990, Lloyd Davies played Frank's younger self in Peter Nichols' autobiographical Forget Me Not Lane. And the following year, he played Laurie Lee's younger self in a stage adaptation of Lee's non-fiction novel Cider With Rosie.

Matthew Lloyd Davies featured in a production of "Black Chiffon" by Lesley Storm at the Richmond Theatre, and tour. In the play, he portrayed the character of Roy, son to characters Alicia and Robert Christie, and brother to Thea. The narrative focuses on the upcoming wedding of Roy to his fiancée, Louise. The family dynamics and tensions between father and son become a significant part of the storyline, especially after Alicia, Roy's mother, is arrested for shoplifting.

In 1997 Lloyd Davies played Algernon in Terry Hands' version of Oscar Wilde's The Importance of Being Earnest. Lloyd Davies' depiction of Algernon infused the character with his own interpretation. His portrayal of the character was recognised for its energy and enthusiasm. Hands' production ran at the Old Vic in London before moving to Toronto's Princess of Wales Theater.

In 2000, Lloyd Davies played Jack Seward in Jonathan Holloway's reworking of Bram Stoker's Dracula.

=== Audiobooks ===
Lloyd Davies transitioned into audiobook narration after he responded to a publisher's advertisement in The Stage and Television Today seeking narrators with a demo tape.

==== A Spy's Life ====
Lloyd Davies, performed the audiobook version of Henry Porter's novel, gaining a ‘best of the year 2022’ award from Audiofile magazine The story centred on Robert Harland, an ex-British spy who works for the UN Secretary-General. Following a plane crash, Harland is once again involved in intelligence activities.

== Other theatre work ==
Lloyd Davies has also appeared several times at The National Theatre.

Other theatre work
Play Title	Year of release	Actor	Film Adaptation
Three Days in the Country	2015		
A Small Family Business	2014		
Great Britain	2014		
The Madness of George III	1991	Lloyd Davies (reprised as Papendiek)	The Madness of King George (1994)

== Filmography ==
Year	Title	Role
1999	Playing the Field (TV Series)	Mr Crowther
1999	Wives and Daughters (TV Series)	Mr Roscoe
1998	A Rather English Marriage (Film)	Chaggers
1996	Over Here (TV Series)	Jarvis
1995	My Good Friend (TV Series)	Tim
1995	The Madness of King George	Arthur Papandiek

== Awards ==
- 2018 Audie Award for Humour – Carpet Diem: Or...How to Save the World by Accident
- 2022 Audie Award for Fiction – The Final Revival of Opal and Nev
- 2022 AudioFile Best of the Year Award for Mystery and Suspense – A Spy's Life
