= Sometimes a Little Brain Damage Can Help =

1984 book by George Carlin

- Author: George Carlin
- Language: English
- Genre: Humor
- Publication date: 1984
- ISBN: 978-0-89471-271-5
- Followed by: Brain Droppings

Sometimes a Little Brain Damage Can Help

Sometimes a Little Brain Damage Can Help is the first book written by comedian George Carlin, published in 1984.

The book is a humor collection, featuring many jokes from Carlin's stand-up routines. The title is a saying of Carlin's, which appears in his second book, Brain Droppings. The slogan also appears on the back of some of his concert T-shirts.
