= Ali Wong =

American comedian and actress (born 1982)

- Wong in 2024
- Born: Alexandra Dawn Wong; April 19, 1982 (age 44); San Francisco, California, U.S.
- Education: University of California, Los Angeles (BA)
- Occupations: Comedian; actress; writer; executive producer
- Years active: 2005–present
- Spouse: Justin Hakuta (m. 2014; div. 2024)
- Children: 2
- Website: aliwong.com

Alexandra Dawn Wong (born April 19, 1982) is an American actress and comedian. Her accolades include two Primetime Emmy Awards, three Golden Globe Awards, one Actor Award, and a Grammy Award nomination. She was named one of Time's 100 most influential people in 2020 and 2023.

She is best known for her Netflix stand-up specials Baby Cobra (2016), Hard Knock Wife (2018), Don Wong (2022), and Single Lady (2024). The last of these won her a Golden Globe Award. She won another Golden Globe and two Primetime Emmy Awards for her starring role in the Netflix dark comedy series Beef (2023), becoming the first woman of Asian descent to win a lead acting Emmy in a Limited Series or Movie.

Wong was a cast member on the ABC show American Housewife (2016–2021) and served as a writer for two episodes of the sitcom Fresh Off the Boat in 2015. She has voiced characters on the animated series Tuca & Bertie (2019–2022) and Big Mouth (2019–2023). She has also written and starred in the romantic comedy film Always Be My Maybe (2019).

== Early life ==
Alexandra Dawn Wong was born in the neighborhood of Pacific Heights, San Francisco, on April 19, 1982. She is the youngest of four children in her family. Her Vietnamese mother, Tam "Tammy" Wong, moved from Huế, South Vietnam (now Vietnam) in 1960 to work as a social worker in the U.S. Her Chinese-American father, Adolphus Wong (1937–2011), was born in San Francisco and worked as an anesthesiologist for Kaiser Permanente for 30 years.

In 2000, Wong graduated from San Francisco University High School in San Francisco where she was student body class president. She went to UCLA, majoring in Asian American studies. During her junior year, she studied in Hanoi, Vietnam. After college, she continued her education in Vietnam through a Fulbright program.

== Career ==
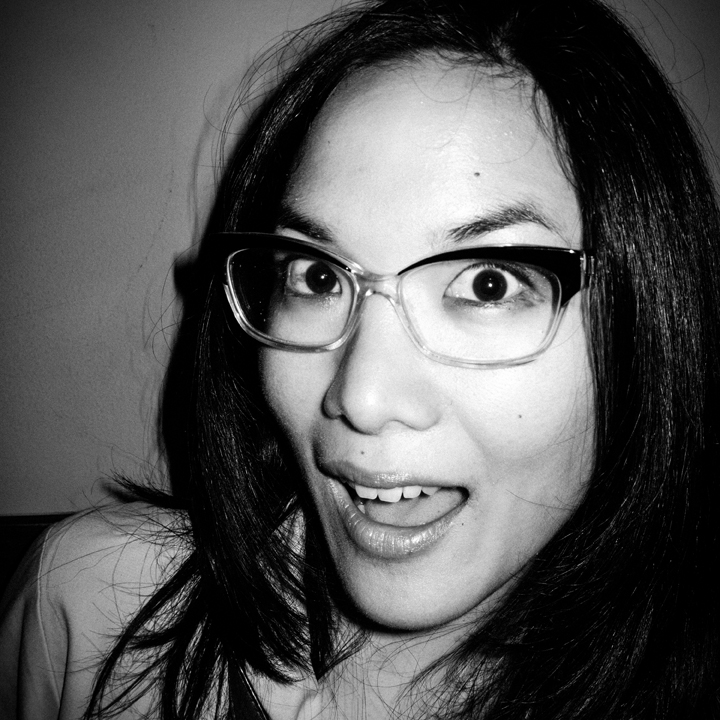
Wong in a promo for Sad People Talking, June 2012

After graduating from college, Wong first tried stand-up comedy when she was 23. She soon moved to New York City to pursue comedy and began performing as often as nine times in one night.

In 2011, Variety named her one of the "10 Comics to Watch". Soon after, she appeared on The Tonight Show, John Oliver's New York Stand Up Show and Dave Attell's Comedy Underground Show. She was also cast as series regular in the NBC comedy series Are You There, Chelsea? and appeared on Chelsea Lately. Next, she was in VH1's Best Week Ever, and MTV's Hey Girl in 2013. Additionally, she starred in Oliver Stone's Savages, and as Kate in the film Dealin' with Idiots.

In 2014, Wong played Dr. Lina Lark in the ABC medical drama series Black Box, opposite Kelly Reilly and Vanessa Redgrave. She guest-starred in three episodes of Inside Amy Schumer. Wong worked as a writer on Fresh Off the Boat, which premiered in 2015. Randall Park, who was a main cast member, had suggested Wong for the writing role. On Mother's Day 2016, Netflix released a stand-up special called Baby Cobra; the special was filmed at the Neptune Theater in Seattle in September 2015, when Wong was seven months pregnant with her first child. According to New York Magazine, "The special's arrival on Netflix is the sort of star-making moment that unites the tastes of the unlikeliest fans".

On September 11, 2016, Wong spoke at, and walked the runway during New York Fashion Week for Opening Ceremony's show. Also in 2016, Wong starred in the ABC sitcom American Housewife until its cancellation in 2021. In 2018, Wong's second Netflix special, Hard Knock Wife, was released. It was filmed in 2017 at the Winter Garden Theatre in Toronto when she was seven months pregnant with her second child. In the same year, she voiced the character Citrus Twisty, a soda genie, in an episode of OK K.O.! Let's Be Heroes.

Wong starred with Randall Park in the 2019 Netflix film Always Be My Maybe, a film directed by Nahnatchka Khan, and written by Wong, Park, and Michael Golamco. From 2019 to 2022, Wong voiced Bertie in the Netflix/Adult Swim animated sitcom Tuca & Bertie. On October 15, 2019, Wong published a book entitled Dear Girls: Intimate Tales, Untold Secrets and Advice for Living Your Best Life. She described it as a life guide for her daughters to read when they become adults. The book won the 2019 Goodreads Choice Award for Humor. In February 2022, Wong released her third Netflix stand-up special, Don Wong.

Wong co-starred with Steven Yeun in the 2023 Netflix drama-comedy series Beef, and was credited as an executive producer alongside Yeun. For her performance in Beef, Wong received a Golden Globe Award for Best Actress – Miniseries or Television Film. She was the first actress of Asian descent to win a Golden Globe in the category. (Note: Sources claim Ali Wong is the first actress of Asian descent to win a Golden Globe for Best Actress in the Limited Series or TV Movie category.) Wong won a Primetime Emmy Award for Outstanding Lead Actress in a Limited or Anthology Series or Movie making her the first actress of Asian descent to win a lead acting Emmy Award in this category. (Note: Sources confirm Ali Wong is the first woman of Asian descent to win an Emmy Award for Outstanding Lead Actress in a Limited Series or Movie.)

In October 2024, Wong was featured on the YouTube talk show Hot Ones.

== Personal life ==
Wong met entrepreneur Justin Hakuta, the son of inventor Ken Hakuta, at the wedding of mutual friends in 2010. At the time, Hakuta was a Fulbright Scholar and a student at Harvard Business School. They married in 2014 and have two daughters. In April 2022, Wong and Hakuta announced they had separated. Wong has said that they remain "best friends". In December 2023, Wong filed for divorce citing "irreconcilable differences", and the divorce was finalized in May 2024.

Wong briefly dated actor Bill Hader in late 2022. In April 2023, they reportedly resumed their relationship. They were seen together at the 75th Emmy Awards on January 15, 2024. In April 2025, Hader discussed how Wong supported him after his home was impacted by the January 2025 Southern California wildfires. In January 2026, it was reported that Wong and Hader had amicably split, due to work schedules and family obligations.

== Filmography ==
=== Film ===
Year	Title	Role	Notes	Ref.
2012	Savages	Claire		
2013	Dealin' with Idiots	Katie		
2016	The Angry Birds Movie	Betty Bird (voice)		
2017	The Lego Ninjago Movie	General Olivia (voice)		
2017	Father Figures	Ali		
2017	The Hero	Herself		
2018	Ralph Breaks the Internet	Felony (voice)		
2019	Always Be My Maybe	Sasha Tran	Also writer and producer	
2020	Birds of Prey	Ellen Yee		
2020	Onward	Gore (voice)		
2020	Phineas and Ferb the Movie: Candace Against the Universe	Super Super Big Doctor (voice)		
2026	Steps	Lilith (voice)		

=== Television ===
Year(s)	Title	Role	Notes	Ref.
2011	Breaking In	Ana Ng	3 episodes	
2012	Are You There, Chelsea?	Olivia	12 episodes	
2014	Black Box	Dr. Lina Lark	13 episodes	
2014–2015	Inside Amy Schumer	Various characters	3 episodes	
2015	BoJack Horseman	Maddy (voice)	Episode: "Escape from L.A."	
2016	Animals	Dana (voice)	Episode: "Rats"	
2016–2021	American Housewife	Doris	Series regular	
2017	Fresh Off the Boat	Margot	Episode: "The Flush"	
2018	Ask the StoryBots	The Brain	Episode: "How Do Ears Hear?"	
2018	OK K.O.! Let's Be Heroes	Twisty (voice)	Episode: "Soda Genie"	
2019–2022	Tuca & Bertie	Bertie (voice)	Main role and executive producer	
2019–2025	Big Mouth	Ali (voice)	19 episodes	
2020	Love, Victor	Ms. Thomas	Recurring role	
2022	Human Resources	Becca Lee (voice)	5 episodes	
2022	Paper Girls	Adult Erin	5 episodes	
2023	Beef	Amy Lau	Main role and executive producer	
2024	Jentry Chau vs. the Underworld	Jentry Chau (voice)	Lead role and executive producer	
2024	Monsters at Work	Jill (voice)	5 episodes	
2026	Abbott Elementary	Ms. Pittman	Guest role	

==== As herself ====
Year	Title	Notes	Ref.
2012	Chelsea Lately	9 episodes	
2013	Hey Girl	5 episodes	
2013	Best Week Ever	16 episodes	
2016	Ali Wong: Baby Cobra	Netflix comedy special	
2017	Bill Nye Saves the World	Episode: "Sex, Drugs and Superbugs"	
2018	Ugly Delicious	Episode: "Stuffed"	
2018	Ali Wong: Hard Knock Wife	Netflix comedy special	
2022	Celebrity IOU	"Ali Wong's Renovation Surprise"	
2022	Ali Wong: Don Wong	Netflix comedy special	
2023	RuPaul's Drag Race	Guest judge; Episode: "Two Queens, One Joke"	
2023	RuPaul's Drag Race: Untucked	Guest judge; Episode: "Two Queens, One Joke"	
2024	Ali Wong: Single Lady	Netflix comedy special	

=== Book ===
Year	Title	Publisher	Identifier	Ref.
2019	Dear Girls	Random House	Paperback: ISBN 978-0-525-50885-4; Hardcover: ISBN 978-0-525-50883-0	

== Awards and nominations ==
Awards and nominations received by Ali Wong
Organizations (Note: Awards, festivals, honors and other miscellaneous organizations are listed in alphabetical order.)	Year (Note: Year in which award ceremony was held. Each year is linked to the article about the awards held that year, wherever possible.)	Category	Work	Result	Ref.
AACTA Awards	2024	Best Actress in a Series	Beef	Nominated	
AACTA Awards	2024	Best Drama Series	Beef	Nominated	
Actor Awards	2024	Outstanding Performance by a Female Actor in a Miniseries or Television Movie	Beef	Won	
American Film Institute Awards	2023	Top 10 Television Programs of the Year	Beef	Won	
Annie Awards	2020	Outstanding Achievement for Voice Acting in an Animated Television/Broadcast Production	Tuca & Bertie	Nominated	
Astra TV Awards	2024	Best Streaming Limited or Anthology Series	Beef	Won	
Astra TV Awards	2024	Best Actress in a Streaming Limited or Anthology Series or Movie	Beef	Won	
British Academy Television Awards	2024	Best International Programme	Beef	Nominated	
Critics' Choice Television Awards	2024	Best Limited Series	Beef	Won	
Critics' Choice Television Awards	2024	Best Actress in a Limited Series or Movie Made for Television	Beef	Won	
Critics' Choice Television Awards	2025	Best Comedy Special	Ali Wong: Single Lady	Won	
Directors Guild of America Awards	2025	Outstanding Directing – Variety Specials	Ali Wong: Single Lady	Nominated	
Dorian Awards	2023	Best TV Performance – Comedy	Beef	Nominated	
Gold Derby Awards	2023	Limited/Movie Actress	Beef	Won	
Golden Globe Awards	2024	Best Limited or Anthology Series or Television Film	Beef	Won	
Golden Globe Awards	2024	Best Actress – Miniseries or Television Film	Beef	Won	
Golden Globe Awards	2025	Best Performance in Stand-Up Comedy on Television	Ali Wong: Single Lady	Won	
Goodreads Choice Awards	2019	Humor	Dear Girls	Won	
Gotham Awards	2019	Breakthrough Series – Short Form	Tuca & Bertie	Nominated	
Gotham Awards	2023	Breakthrough Series – Short Form	Beef	Won	
Gotham Awards	2023	Outstanding Performance in a New Series	Beef	Won	
Gotham TV Awards	2026	Outstanding Limited or Anthology Series	Beef	Nominated	
Grammy Awards	2026	Best Comedy Album	Single Lady	Nominated	
Independent Spirit Awards	2024	Best New Scripted Series	Beef	Won	
Independent Spirit Awards	2024	Best Lead Performance in a New Scripted Series	Beef	Won	
NAACP Image Awards	2024	Outstanding Actress in a Television Movie, Mini-Series or Dramatic Special	Beef	Nominated	
People's Choice Awards	2018	Comedy Act	Herself	Nominated	
People's Choice Awards	2019	Comedy Movie Star	Always Be My Maybe	Nominated	
People's Choice Awards	2021	Comedy Act	The Milk & Money Tour	Nominated	
People's Choice Awards	2024	Bingeworthy Show of the Year	Beef	Nominated	
People's Choice Awards	2024	Female TV Star of the Year	Beef	Nominated	
People's Choice Awards	2024	Comedy TV Star of the Year	Beef	Nominated	
Primetime Creative Arts Emmy Awards	2024	Outstanding Character Voice-Over Performance	Tuca & Bertie: Fledging Day	Nominated	
Primetime Emmy Awards	2022	Outstanding Writing for a Variety Special	Ali Wong: Don Wong	Nominated	
Primetime Emmy Awards	2024	Outstanding Limited or Anthology Series	Beef	Won	
Primetime Emmy Awards	2024	Outstanding Lead Actress in a Limited or Anthology Series or Movie	Beef	Won	
Primetime Emmy Awards	2025	Primetime Emmy Award for Outstanding Variety Special (Pre-Recorded)	Ali Wong: Single Lady	Nominated	
Primetime Emmy Awards	2026	Outstanding Limited or Anthology Series	Beef	Nominated	
Producers Guild of America Awards	2024	Best Limited Series Television	Beef	Won	
Producers Guild of America Awards	2025	Outstanding Producer of Live Entertainment, Variety, Sketch, Standup & Talk Television	Ali Wong: Single Lady	Nominated	
Satellite Awards	2024	Best Miniseries or Television Film	Beef	Nominated	
Satellite Awards	2024	Best Actress – Miniseries or Television Film	Beef	Nominated	
TCA Awards	2023	Outstanding Achievement in Movies, Miniseries and Specials	Beef	Won	
