= Wall High School (Texas) =

Location
- 8065 Loop 570; Wall, Texas 76957-0259; United States

Information
- School type: Public high school
- School district: Wall Independent School District
- Principal: Ryan Snowden
- Staff: 34.98 (FTE)
- Grades: 9-12
- Enrollment: 340 (2023-2024)
- Student to teacher ratio: 9.72
- Colors: Green & White
- Athletics conference: UIL Class 3A
- Mascot: Hawk
- Website: Wall High School website

Wall High School is a public high school located in the rural community of Wall, Texas in Tom Green County, United States and is classified as a 3A school by the UIL. It is a part of the Wall Independent School District located in east central Tom Green County serving the communities of Wall and San Angelo TX. In 2013, the school was rated "Met Standard" by the Texas Education Agency.

== Academics ==
Wall High School has obtained state titles within these U.I.L. academic events:

- Computer Science
  - 2008 (2A) - Team
  - 2008 (2A) - Individual
  - 2009 (2A) - Team
  - 2010 (2A) - Team
  - 2011 (2A) - Team
  - 2012 (2A) - Individual
  - 2012 (2A) - Team
  - 2013 (2A) - Individual
  - 2013 (2A) - Team
  - 2019 (3A) - Team
  - 2025 (3A) - Individual
  - 2025 (3A) - Team
- Computer Applications
  - 2004 (2A) - Individual
  - 2013 (2A) - Individual
- Digital Animation
  - 2025 (3A) - Team
- Editorial Writing
  - 2018 (3A) - Individual
- Feature Writing
  - 2022 (3A) - Individual
- Number Sense
  - 1971 (1A) - Individual
  - 1972 (1A) - Individual
  - 1973 (2A) - Individual
- Theater
  - 2024
- Theatrical Design
  - 2024 (3A-Marketing) - Individual

Wall High School has obtained state titles within these Robotics events:

- TCEA Robotics
  - 2017 Inventions Team
  - 2017 Arena Team
  - 2018 Arena Team

Wall High School has been State Runner-Up in these U.I.L academic events

- Computer Science
  - 2024 (3A) - Team
  - 2021 (3A) - Team
  - 2021 (3A) - Individual
  - 2019 (3A) - Individual
  - 2018 (3A) - Team
  - 2011 (2A) - Individual
  - 2010 (2A) - Individual
  - 2009 (2A) - Individual
- Computer Applications
  - 2005 (2A) - Individual
- Current Issues and Events
  - 2016 (3A) - Team
- Digital Animation
  - 2023 (3A) - Team
- Feature Writing
  - 2017 (3A) - Individual
- Journalism
  - 2018 (3A) - Team
- News Writing
  - 2009 (3A) - Individual
- Poetry
  - 2018 (3A) - Individual
- Theatrical Design
  - 2023 (3A-Marketing) - Individual
- Traditional Animation
  - 2024 (3A) - Team

== Athletics ==
The Wall Hawks compete in the following sports:

Cross Country, Volleyball, Football, Basketball, Baseball, Softball, Tennis, Golf, and Track and Field.

=== State Titles ===
Wall High School has obtained state titles within these U.I.L. athletic events:

- Baseball
  - 2019 (3A)
  - 2025 (3A/D2)
- Boys Cross Country
  - 2006 (2A)
  - 2008 (2A)
- Boys Golf
  - 2011 (2A)
  - 2025 (3A)
- Boys Track
  - 1972 (2A)
- Football
  - 2025 (3A/D2)
- Girls Basketball
  - 2014 (2A)
  - 2016 (3A)
  - 2026 (3A/D2)
- Girls Cross Country
  - 2007 (2A)
  - 2026 (3A)
- Girls Golf
  - 2007 (2A)
  - 2008 (2A)
  - 2009 (2A)
  - 2021 (3A)
  - 2022 (3A)
- Lone Star Cup
  - 2017 (3A)
  - 2026 (3A)
- Tennis
  - 1984 (Boys Singles 2A)
  - 1990 (Boys Singles 2A)
  - 1991 (Boys Singles 2A)
  - 2002 (Boys Singles 2A)
  - 2003 (Boys Singles 2A)
  - 2004 (Boys Singles 2A)
  - 2010 (Mixed Doubles 2A)
  - 2011 (Boys Doubles 2A)
  - 2013 (Girls Doubles 2A)
  - 2016 (Mixed Doubles 3A)
  - 2018 (Boys Doubles 3A)
  - 2019 (Boys Doubles 3A)
  - 2021 (Boys Singles 3A)
  - 2022 (Boys Singles 3A)
  - 2022 (Boys Doubles 3A)
  - 2024 (Mixed Doubles 3A)
  - 2025 (Girls Singles 3A)

==== State Finalists ====
Wall High School has been State Runner-Up in these U.I.L Athletic events

- Football
  - 2012 (2A)
- Tennis
  - 2014 (Boys Doubles 2A)
- Baseball
  - 2022 (3A)
- Volleyball
  - 2026 (3A/D2)

Wall High School has also made many state appearances in multiple sports and academics.
