= Nothing Like I Imagined =

Memoir by Mindy Kaling

Nothing Like I Imagined (Except for Sometimes)
- Author: Mindy Kaling
- Audio read by: Mindy Kaling
- Release number: 3
- Genre: Memoir
- Publisher: Amazon Original Stories
- Publication date: 2020
- Preceded by: Why Not Me?

Nothing Like I Imagined (Except for Sometimes) is the third memoir by actress and comedy writer Mindy Kaling. Published in 2020, it is an essay collection made up of six stories, sold individually as Amazon Original Stories. Kaling reads the 2-hour, 19-minute audio version.

In this third installment of Kaling's memoirs, her new role as a single parent takes a central place, particularly as her own mother had died before Kaling's daughter was born. Reviewing the collection for The New York Times, Lauren Christensen emphasized Kaling's comedic approach to narrating potentially painful topics, using humor to approach dark topics for herself and which the reader might recognize in themselves too. Christensen wrote, "Kaling's voice is a comforting cure-all, an honest and optimistic antidote to all of life's woes."
