= Mindy Kaling =

American actress, comedian, and writer (born 1979)

- Kaling in 2026
- Born: Vera Mindy Chokalingam; June 24, 1979 (age 47); Cambridge, Massachusetts, U.S.
- Education: Dartmouth College (BA)
- Occupations: Actress; comedian; writer; producer
- Years active: 2002–present
- Children: 3

Vera Mindy Chokalingam (born June 24, 1979), known professionally as Mindy Kaling (/ˈkeɪlɪŋ/), is an American actress, comedian, screenwriter, and producer. Known for her work on television, she has received a Tony Award and six nominations at the Primetime Emmy Awards. Among other honors, she has also received the National Medal of the Arts (Note: which is the highest honor given to artists and arts patrons by the United States government.) in 2021 and the Producers Guild of America's Norman Lear Achievement in Television Award in 2023. Kaling founded the production company Kaling International in 2012.

Kaling first gained recognition for playing Kelly Kapoor in the NBC sitcom The Office (2005–2013), on which she also worked as a writer. Credited with twenty-four episodes, Kaling was the most prolific writer on staff. For her work on it, she was nominated for a Primetime Emmy Award for Outstanding Writing for a Comedy Series. She gained wider attention for creating, producing and playing the title role in the sitcom The Mindy Project (2012–2017). She then created other television comedies, including Never Have I Ever (2020–2023), The Sex Lives of College Girls (2021–2025), Running Point (2025–present), and Not Suitable for Work (2026).

Her film career includes voice roles in Despicable Me (2010), Wreck-It Ralph (2012), and Inside Out (2015) as well as live action roles in No Strings Attached (2011), The Five-Year Engagement (2012), A Wrinkle in Time (2018), Ocean's 8 (2018), and Late Night (2019), the last of which she also wrote and produced. Her two memoirs both reached The New York Times Best Seller list. She also received a Tony Award for Best Musical as a producer for the musical A Strange Loop.

== Early life and education ==
Vera Mindy Chokalingam was born June 24, 1979, in Cambridge, Massachusetts, to a Tamil father, Avudaiappan Chokalingam and a Bengali mother, Swati Roy Sircar. Her parents had been living in Nigeria and immigrated to the United States earlier that year with her elder brother, Vijay Chokalingam. Her father was an architect, and mother was an obstetrician/gynecologist at St. Elizabeth's Medical Center, Boston. Her mother died of pancreatic cancer in 2012.

Kaling has said she has never been called Vera, her first name, but has been referred to as Mindy since her mother was pregnant with her while her parents were living in Nigeria. They were already planning to move to the United States and wanted, Kaling said, a "cute American name" for their daughter, and liked the name Mindy from the show Mork & Mindy.

Kaling graduated from Buckingham Browne & Nichols School in 1997. The following year, she entered Dartmouth College, where she was a member of improvisational comedy troupe The Dog Day Players and a cappella group The Rockapellas, and wrote for the Dartmouth Jack-O-Lantern, the college's humor magazine. Kaling graduated from Dartmouth in 2001 with a bachelor's degree in playwriting. She lists the comedy series Dr. Katz, Saturday Night Live, Frasier and Cheers as early influences on her comedy.

== Career ==
=== 2002–2004: Career beginnings ===
While a 19-year-old sophomore at Dartmouth, Kaling was an intern on Late Night with Conan O'Brien. She has said that she never saw a family like hers on TV, which gave her a dual perspective she uses in her writing. She thinks the "everyone against me" mentality is what she learned as a child of immigrants. She named her Mindy Project character Mindy Lahiri after author Jhumpa Lahiri. After college, she moved to Brooklyn, New York. She said one of her worst job experiences was as a production assistant for three months on the Crossing Over With John Edward psychic show. She described it as "depressing". During this same time, she performed stand-up comedy.

Kaling devised her stage name after discovering while doing stand-up comedy that emcees would have trouble pronouncing her last name, Chokalingam, and sometimes made jokes about it. She toured solo and with Craig Robinson, who was later a fellow cast member of The Office. In August 2002, she portrayed Ben Affleck in an off-Broadway play called Matt & Ben, which she co-wrote with her best friend from college, Brenda Withers, who played Matt Damon. Time magazine named it one of their "Top Ten Theatrical Events of The Year", and it was "a surprise hit" at the 2002 New York International Fringe Festival.

Initially, Withers and Kaling had, "for their own entertainment, mockingly pretended to be the best friends Matt Damon and Ben Affleck; that pretending spawned Matt & Ben, the goofy play that reimagined how Damon and Affleck came to write the movie Good Will Hunting". Kaling wrote a blog, Things I've Bought That I Love, which reemerged on her website on September 29, 2011. She wrote it under the name Mindy Ephron, "a name Kaling chose because she was amused by the idea of her 20-something Indian-American self as a long-lost Ephron sister".

=== 2004–2011: The Office ===
In 2004, when The Office producer Greg Daniels was working to adapt The Office from the BBC TV series of the same name, he hired Kaling as a writer-performer after reading a spec script she wrote. He said, "She's very original ... If anything feels phony or lazy or passé, she'll pounce on it." When Kaling joined The Office, she was 24 years old and was the only woman on a staff of eight. She took on the role of Kelly Kapoor, debuting in the series' second episode, "Diversity Day". Her TV appearances include a 2005 episode of Curb Your Enthusiasm, playing Richard Lewis's assistant. She is featured on the CD Comedy Death-Ray and guest-wrote parts of an episode of Saturday Night Live in April 2006. After her film debut in The 40-Year-Old Virgin with Steve Carell, Kaling appeared in the film Unaccompanied Minors as a waitress.

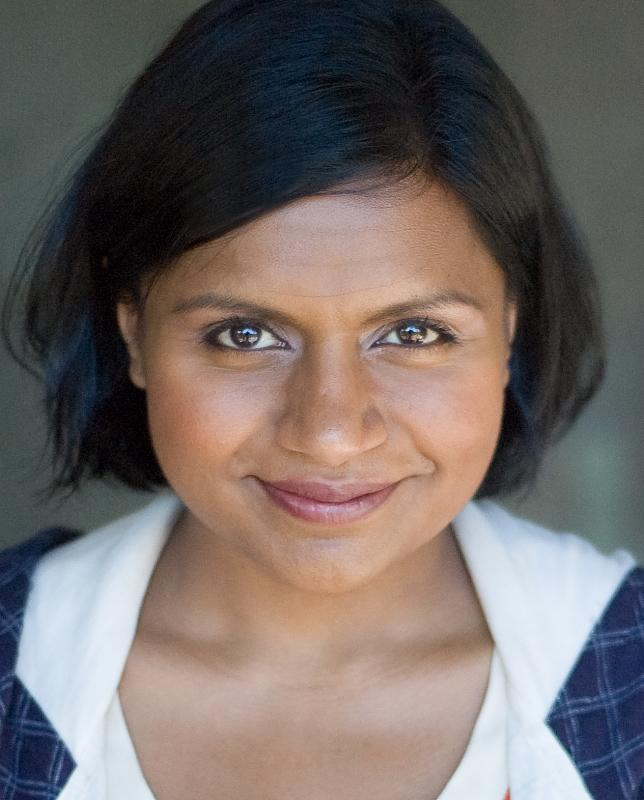
Kaling in 2008

In an interview with The A.V. Club, she stated that Kelly is "an exaggerated version of what I think the upper-level writers believe my personality is". Kaling directed The Office webisode The 3rd Floor. She directed the Season 6 episode "Body Language", which marked her television directorial debut. In 2007, she had a small part in License to Wed alongside fellow Office actors John Krasinski, Angela Kinsey, and Brian Baumgartner. She appeared in the 2009 film Night at the Museum: Battle of the Smithsonian as a Smithsonian National Air and Space Museum tour guide.

On September 15, 2011, when her contract was set to expire at the end of Season 7, she signed a new contract to stay with the show for Season 8 and was promoted to full executive producer. Her Universal Television contract included a development deal for a new show (eventually titled The Mindy Project), in which she appeared as an actress and contributed as a writer. Kaling left The Office after the ninth-season episode "New Guys", but returned to guest-star in its final episode. In 2011, Kaling published a memoir, Is Everyone Hanging Out Without Me? (And Other Concerns), which appeared on the New York Times Best Seller list. Her second book, Why Not Me?, covers the events that have happened in her life since 2011, and was published on September 15, 2015. She published a third memoir, Nothing Like I Imagined (Except For Sometimes), with Amazon Original Stories in 2020.

Kaling and her fellow writers and producers of The Office were nominated five consecutive times for the Primetime Emmy Award for Outstanding Comedy Series. In 2010, she was nominated with Daniels for Outstanding Writing in a Comedy Series for the episode "Niagara". In a 2019 interview with Elle Magazine, Kaling spoke about the sexism she faced with the Television Academy, having had to go to great lengths to prove her contribution as a producer when the academy informed her she would be cut from the producer list because there were too many producers. She said that to receive her rightful producing credit when The Office was nominated for an Emmy for Outstanding Comedy Series, "They made me, not any of the other producers, fill out a whole form and write an essay about all my contributions as a writer and a producer… I had to get letters from all the other male, white producers saying that I had contributed, when my actual record stood for itself." In 2011, she played the role of Shira, a doctor who is a roommate and colleague of the main character Emma (played by Natalie Portman) in No Strings Attached. Kaling also made an appearance as Vanetha in The Five-Year Engagement in 2012.

=== 2012–present: producing and film work ===
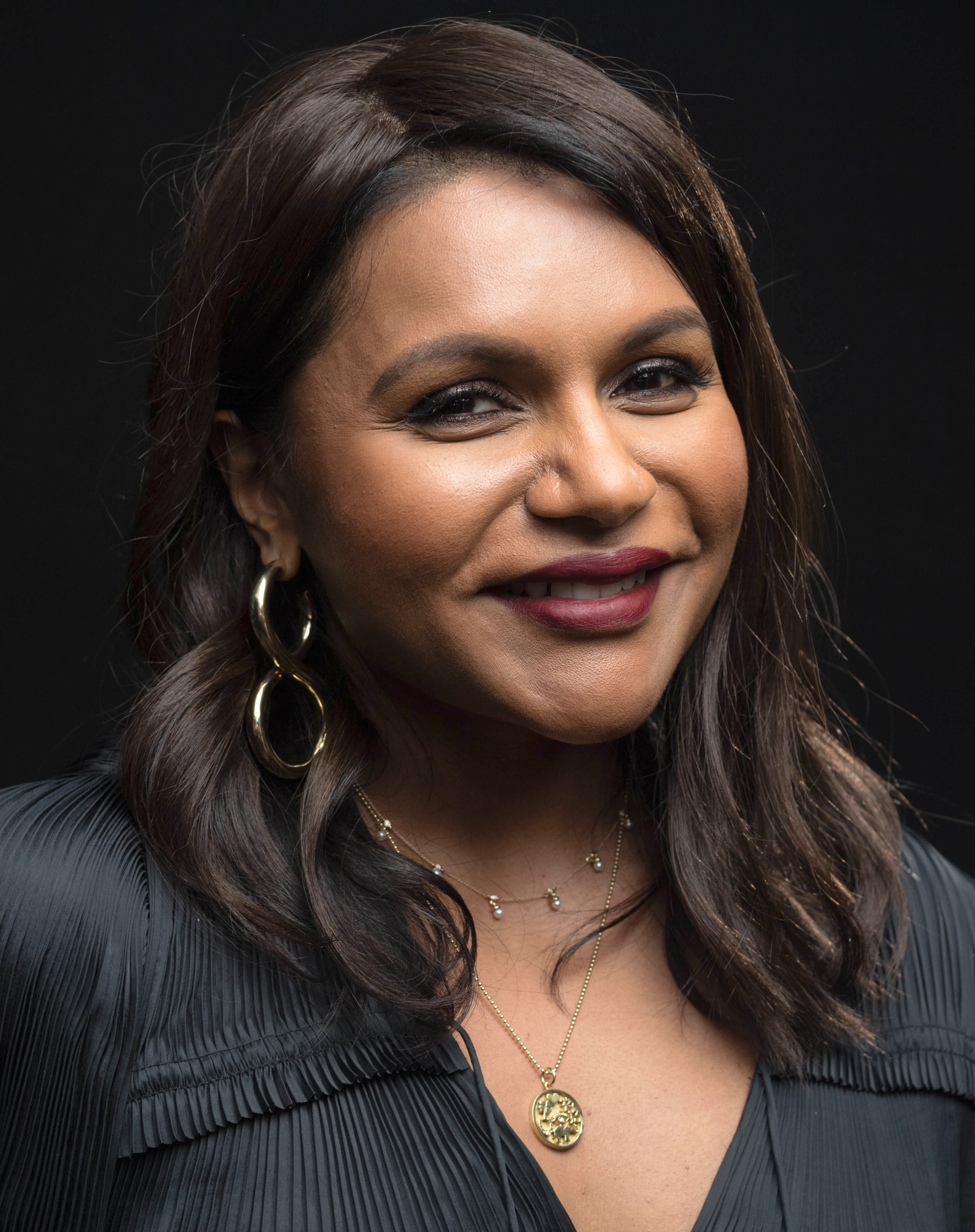
Kaling at Montclair Film Festival in 2019

In 2012, Kaling pitched a single-camera comedy to Fox called The Mindy Project, which Kaling wrote, produced and starred in. Fox began airing the series in 2012. Also in 2012, Kaling founded the production company, Kaling International.

In 2013, Time magazine named her one of the 100 most influential people in the world. Fox canceled her series The Mindy Project in May 2015, with it later being picked up by Hulu for a 26-episode fourth season and a 16-episode fifth season. In March 2017, Kaling announced that the show's sixth season, which would air starting September 2017, would be the last. The series concluded on November 14, 2017.

Kaling voiced Taffyta Muttonfudge in Disney's animated comedy film Wreck-It Ralph and Disgust in Pixar's 2015 film Inside Out. In 2017, NBC created Champions, where Kaling is a co-creator, writer, and producer. She had a recurring guest role on the show, which premiered March 8, 2018, on NBC. It was cancelled after one season. In 2018, she played Mrs. Who in A Wrinkle in Time, the live-action Disney adaptation of the novel, and starred alongside Helena Bonham Carter, Sandra Bullock, Cate Blanchett, Anne Hathaway, Awkwafina and Rihanna in Ocean's 8, the all-female version of Ocean's Eleven. In 2020, Kaling created the Netflix series Never Have I Ever with Lang Fisher, a comedy partially based on Kaling's childhood story growing up in the Boston area. It premiered on Netflix on April 27, 2020, and is about an Indian American high school student, played by Maitreyi Ramakrishnan, dealing with the death of her father. The series received positive reviews. CNN and Teen Vogue have described the series as a watershed moment for South Asian representation in Hollywood, and praised Kaling for breaking South Asian stereotypes.

In February 2021, HBO Max announced they had ordered the adult-oriented Scooby-Doo spin-off series Velma, with Kaling as executive producer as well as voicing the titular character. The series premiered on January 12, 2023, to mixed to negative reviews from critics. Velma's fan reception was even more polarizing and got overwhelming negative reviews due to the humor and criticized its meta storytelling, characterization, writing, and departures from the traditional Scooby-Doo format. Velma was later ranked by several publications as one of the worst television series of 2023. That year, she was appointed as a board member along with historian June Li and Young Yang Chung for the Smithsonian's National Museum of Asian Art.

In 2024, she joined the short film Anuja, as a producer. The film was nominated for the Academy Award for Best Live Action Short Film at the 97th Academy Awards.

Kaling co-created the Netflix sports comedy Running Point, which premiered in 2025. The series stars Kate Hudson as the new owner of a Los Angeles-based basketball team, and was inspired by the story of Jeanie Buss.

== Personal life ==
Kaling has three children: a daughter born in December 2017, a son born in September 2020, and a daughter born in February 2024. She has kept the paternity of her children private. Kaling identifies as Hindu but has expressed insecurity in her knowledge of the religion.

Kaling has a close friendship with B. J. Novak, whom she met through writing for The Office, with Novak calling Kaling "the most important person in my life" (on Fresh Air with Terry Gross). They dated on and off while writing and acting on the show. Novak is the godfather of Kaling's first two children.

In 2012, Kaling was included in the Time 100 list of the world's most influential people. In 2014, she was named one of Glamour's Women of the Year. On June 10, 2018, she received an honorary degree of Doctor of Humane Letters from Dartmouth College in Hanover, New Hampshire. In October 2023, Kaling took to social media to stand alongside Israel. In June 2024, the Los Angeles Times featured Kaling in its "L.A. Influential" series as a "creator who is leaving their mark" in Los Angeles.

== Filmography ==
=== Film ===
Year	Title	Role(s)	Notes
2005	The 40-Year-Old Virgin	Amy	
2006	Unaccompanied Minors	Restaurant Hostess	
2007	License to Wed	Shelly	
2009	Night at the Museum: Battle of the Smithsonian	The Docent	Cameo
2010	Despicable Me	The Tourist Mom (voice)	Cameo
2011	No Strings Attached	Shira	
2012	The Five-Year Engagement	Vaneetha	
2012	Wreck-It Ralph	Taffyta Muttonfudge (voice)	
2013	This Is the End	Herself	Cameo
2014	Mr. Peabody & Sherman	Helen of Troy (voice)	Uncredited role
2015	Inside Out	Disgust (voice)	
2015	Riley's First Date?	Disgust (voice)	Short film
2015	The Night Before	Sarah	
2018	A Wrinkle in Time	Mrs. Who	
2018	Ocean's 8	Amita	
2019	Late Night	Molly Patel	Also writer and producer
2020	Definition Please	—N/a	Executive producer
2021	Locked Down	Kate	
2022	To Kill a Tiger	—N/a	Executive producer
2024	A Nice Indian Boy	—N/a	Executive producer
2024	Anuja	—N/a	Short film; executive producer

=== Television ===
Year	Title	Role	Notes
2005	Curb Your Enthusiasm	Richard Lewis' Assistant	Episode: "Lewis Needs a Kidney"
2005–2013	The Office	Kelly Kapoor	Main role; also writer (some episodes); Producer (seasons 3–4); Co-executive producer (seasons 5–7); Consulting producer (season 8); Executive producer (season 8)
2012–2017	The Mindy Project	Dr. Mindy Lahiri	Main role; also creator, writer and executive producer
2014	Sesame Street	Herself	Episode: "The Enthusiastic Penelope Penguin"
2015	The Muppets	Herself	Episode: "Single All the Way"
2017	Animals	Sandy (voice)	Episode: "Squirrels"
2018	Future-Worm!	Additional voices	Episode: "Megan Muck Wars"
2018	Champions	Priya Patel	Also co-creator, writer, and executive producer
2018	It's Always Sunny in Philadelphia	Cindy	Episode: "The Gang Makes Paddy's Great Again"
2019	Four Weddings and a Funeral	—N/a	Creator, writer and executive producer
2019–2023	The Morning Show	Audra Khatri	5 episodes
2020–2023	Never Have I Ever	—N/a	Creator, writer and executive producer
2021–2024	Monsters at Work	Val Little (voice)	20 episodes
2021–2025	The Sex Lives of College Girls	—N/a	Creator, writer and executive producer
2023–2024	Velma	Velma Dinkley (voice)	Main role, also executive producer
2025–present	Running Point	—N/a	Creator, writer and executive producer
2026	Not Suitable for Work	—N/a	Creator, writer and executive producer

==== Writing credits ====
Year	Series	Season	Episode	Title
2005	The Office	Season 1	Episode 6	"Hot Girl"
2005	The Office	Season 2	Episode 1	"The Dundies"
2006	The Office	Season 2	Episode 12	"The Injury"
2006	The Office	Season 2	Episode 18	"Take Your Daughter to Work Day"
2006	The Office	Season 3	Episode 6	"Diwali"
2007	The Office	Season 3	Episode 15	"Ben Franklin"
2007	The Office	Season 4	Episode 10	"Branch Wars"
2008	The Office	Season 4	Episode 15	"Night Out"
2008	The Office	Season 5	Episode 9	"Frame Toby"
2009	The Office	Season 5	Episode 16	"Lecture Circuit: Part 1"
2009	The Office	Season 5	Episode 17	"Lecture Circuit: Part 2"
2009	The Office	Season 5	Episode 19	"Golden Ticket"
2009	The Office	Season 6	Episode 4 & 5	"Niagara"
2009	The Office	Season 6	Episode 13	"Secret Santa"
2010	The Office	Season 6	Episode 16	"The Manager and the Salesman"
2010	The Office	Season 6	Episode 22	"Secretary's Day"
2010	The Office	Season 7	Episode 5	"The Sting"
2010	The Office	Season 7	Episode 11 & 12	"Classy Christmas"
2011	The Office	Season 7	Episode 21	"Michael's Last Dundies"
2011	The Office	Season 8	Episode 10	"Christmas Wishes"
2012	The Office	Season 8	Episode 17	"Test the Store"
2012	The Mindy Project	Season 1	Episode 1	"Pilot"
2012	The Mindy Project	Season 1	Episode 2	"Hiring and Firing"
2012	The Mindy Project	Season 1	Episode 5	"Danny Castellano Is My Gynecologist"
2012	The Mindy Project	Season 1	Episode 8	"Two is One"
2013	The Mindy Project	Season 1	Episode 12	"Hooking Up Is Hard"
2013	The Mindy Project	Season 1	Episode 13	"Harry & Sally"
2013	The Mindy Project	Season 1	Episode 16	"The One That Got Away"
2013	The Mindy Project	Season 1	Episode 24	"Take Me With You"
2013	The Mindy Project	Season 2	Episode 1	"All My Problems Solved Forever..."
2013	The Mindy Project	Season 2	Episode 8	"You've Got Sext"
2014	The Mindy Project	Season 2	Episode 13	"L.A."
2014	The Mindy Project	Season 2	Episode 14	"The Desert"
2014	The Mindy Project	Season 2	Episode 22	"Danny and Mindy"
2014	The Mindy Project	Season 3	Episode 1	"We're a Couple Now, Haters!"
2014	The Mindy Project	Season 3	Episode 6	"Caramel Princess Time"
2015	The Mindy Project	Season 3	Episode 15	"Danny Castellano Is My Nutritionist"
2015	The Mindy Project	Season 3	Episode 21	"Best Man"
2015	The Mindy Project	Season 4	Episode 1	"While I Was Sleeping"
2015	The Mindy Project	Season 4	Episode 13	"When Mindy Met Danny"
2016	The Mindy Project	Season 4	Episode 14	"Will They or Won't They"
2016	The Mindy Project	Season 4	Episode 18	"Bernardo & Anita"
2016	The Mindy Project	Season 5	Episode 1	"Decision 2016"
2017	The Mindy Project	Season 6	Episode 1	"Is That All There Is?"
2017	The Mindy Project	Season 6	Episode 9	"Danny in Real Life"
2017	The Mindy Project	Season 6	Episode 10	"It Had To Be You"
2018	Champions	Season 1	Episode 1	"Pilot"
2018	Champions	Season 1	Episode 2	"I Think I'm Gonna Tolerate It Here"
2018	Champions	Season 1	Episode 4	"My Fair Uncle"
2019	Four Weddings and a Funeral	Season 1	Episode 1	"Kash With a K"
2019	Four Weddings and a Funeral	Season 1	Episode 2	"Hounslow"
2020	Never Have I Ever	Season 1	Episode 1	"Pilot"
2020	Never Have I Ever	Season 1	Episode 4	"...felt super Indian"
2021	Never Have I Ever	Season 2	Episode 1	"...been a playa"
2021	The Sex Lives of College Girls	Season 1	Episode 1	"Welcome to Essex"
2021	The Sex Lives of College Girls	Season 1	Episode 6	"Parents Weekend"
2022	The Sex Lives of College Girls	Season 2	Episode 6	"Dopplebanger"
2022	Never Have I Ever	Season 3	Episode 1	"...been slut-shamed"
2023	Never Have I Ever	Season 4	Episode 1	"...lost my virginity"
2023	Never Have I Ever	Season 4	Episode 10	"...said goodbye"
2024	The Sex Lives of College Girls	Season 3	Episode 1	"Welcome Back to Essex"
2025	Running Point	Season 1	Episode 1	"Pilot"
2025	Running Point	Season 1	Episode 2	"Joe Pesci"
2025	Running Point	Season 1	Episode 10	"Game Seven"
2025	Running Point	Season 2	Episode 1	"New Coach Who Dis"
2025	Running Point	Season 2	Episode 6	"The Strike"
2025	Not Suitable for Work	Season 1	Episode 1	"Welcome to Murray Hill"
2025	Not Suitable for Work	Season 1	Episode 2	"Evil Nepo Son of the Kin"

==== Directing credits ====
Year	Title	Season	Episode	Title
2009	The Office: Subtle Sexuality		Episode 1	"Creative Differences"
2009	The Office: Subtle Sexuality		Episode 2	"The Replacement"
2009	The Office: Subtle Sexuality		Episode 3	"The Music Video"
2010	The Office	Season 6	Episode 23	"Body Language"
2010	The Office: The 3rd Floor		Episode 1	"Moving On"
2010	The Office: The 3rd Floor		Episode 2	"Lights, Camera, Action!"
2010	The Office: The 3rd Floor		Episode 3	"The Final Product"
2011	The Office	Season 7	Episode 21	"Michael's Last Dundies"
2011	The Office: The Girl Next Door		Episode 1	"The Story of Subtle Sexuality"
2011	The Office: The Girl Next Door		Episode 2	"The Girl Next Door"

== Awards and nominations ==
Over her career she has received two Screen Actors Guild Awards and the Tony Award, and six Primetime Emmy Awards nominations. She was recognized by Time magazine as one of the 100 most influential people in the world in 2013. A decade later she received the Producers Guild of America's Norman Lear Achievement in Television Award, and was awarded the National Medal of the Arts from President Joe Biden.

In 2013, Entertainment Weekly identified Kaling as one of the "50 Coolest and Most Creative Entertainers" in Hollywood. In the same year, Kaling was recognized by Time magazine as one of the 100 most influential people in the world. In March 2023, Kaling was awarded the 2021 National Medal of Arts from the US president Joe Biden in the White House.

Year	Award	Category	Nominated work	Result
2005	Writers Guild of America Awards	New Series	The Office	Nominated
2005	Writers Guild of America Awards	Comedy Series	The Office	Nominated
2006	Screen Actors Guild Awards	Outstanding Ensemble in a Comedy Series	The Office	Won
2006	Writers Guild of America Awards	Comedy Series	The Office	Won
2007	Primetime Emmy Awards	Outstanding Comedy Series	The Office	Nominated
2007	Screen Actors Guild Awards	Outstanding Ensemble in a Comedy Series	The Office	Won
2007	Writers Guild of America Awards	Comedy Series	The Office	Nominated
2007	Asian Excellence Awards	Supporting Television Actress	The Office	Won
2008	Primetime Emmy Awards	Outstanding Comedy Series	The Office	Nominated
2008	Screen Actors Guild Awards	Outstanding Ensemble in a Comedy Series	The Office	Nominated
2008	Writers Guild of America Awards	Comedy Series	The Office	Nominated
2009	Primetime Emmy Awards	Outstanding Comedy Series	The Office	Nominated
2009	Prism Awards	Performance in a Comedy Series	The Office	Nominated
2009	Screen Actors Guild Awards	Outstanding Ensemble in a Comedy Series	The Office	Nominated
2009	Writers Guild of America Awards	Comedy Series	The Office	Nominated
2010	Primetime Emmy Awards	Outstanding Comedy Series	The Office	Nominated
2010	Primetime Emmy Awards	Outstanding Writing for a Comedy Series, "Niagara"	The Office	Nominated
2010	Screen Actors Guild Awards	Outstanding Ensemble in a Comedy Series	The Office	Nominated
2010	Writers Guild of America Awards	Comedy Series	The Office	Nominated
2011	Primetime Emmy Awards	Outstanding Comedy Series	The Office	Nominated
2011	Screen Actors Guild Awards	Outstanding Ensemble in a Comedy Series	The Office	Nominated
2012	Screen Actors Guild Awards	Outstanding Ensemble in a Comedy Series	The Office	Nominated
2012	Writers Guild of America Awards	New Series	The Mindy Project	Nominated
2012	People's Choice Awards	Favorite New TV Comedy	The Mindy Project	Nominated
2012	Critics' Choice Television Awards	Most Exciting New Series	The Mindy Project	Won
2013	Gracie Awards	Outstanding Producer – Entertainment	The Mindy Project	Won
2013	NAACP Image Award	Outstanding Comedy Series	The Mindy Project	Nominated
2013	TCA Awards	Outstanding New Program	The Mindy Project	Nominated
2013	Teen Choice Awards	Choice TV: Breakout Show	The Mindy Project	Nominated
2013	Teen Choice Awards	Choice TV Actress: Comedy	The Mindy Project	Nominated
2014	Gracie Awards	Outstanding Female Actor – Comedy	The Mindy Project	Won
2014	NAACP Image Award	Outstanding Comedy Series	The Mindy Project	Nominated
2014	TCA Awards	Outstanding Achievement in Comedy	The Mindy Project	Nominated
2014	TCA Awards	Individual Achievement in Comedy	The Mindy Project	Nominated
2014	Teen Choice Awards	Choice TV Actress: Comedy	The Mindy Project	Nominated
2015	Satellite Awards	Best Actress in a Musical or Comedy Series	The Mindy Project	Won
2015	Readers Choice Awards	Reader's Choice Award for Best Humor Book	Why Not Me?	Won
2018	Teen Choice Awards	Choice Movie Actress: Fantasy	A Wrinkle in Time	Nominated
2019	Teen Choice Awards	Choice Summer Movie Actress	Late Night	Nominated
2019	People's Choice Awards	Favorite Comedy Movie Star	Late Night	Nominated
2022	Tony Award	Best Musical	A Strange Loop	Won

== Bibliography ==
- Kaling, Mindy, and Brenda Withers. Matt & Ben: A New Play. Woodstock, NY: Overlook Press, 2004; ISBN 978-1-585-67571-5
- Kaling, Mindy. Unbelievable Holiday Tales: Scripting a Fantasy of a Family, The New York Times, December 18, 2009.
- Kaling, Mindy. Is Everyone Hanging Out Without Me? (And Other Concerns), New York: Crown Archetype, 2011; ISBN 978-0-307-88627-9; OCLC 698332696
- Kaling, Mindy. Questions I Ask When I Want to Talk About Myself: 50 Topics to Share With Friends, Clarkson Potter, 2013; ISBN 978-0-449-81988-3
- Kaling, Mindy. Why Not Me?, New York : Crown Archetype, 2015; ISBN 978-0-804-13814-7; OCLC 910914690
- Kaling, Mindy. Nothing Like I Imagined (Except for Sometimes), Amazon Original Stories, 2020
