= Katherine Hastings =

American poet

Katherine Hastings is an American poet from Northern California. Her full length collections are “Temple of Curiosities” (Spuyten Duyvil, 2026), “A Different Beauty” (Spuyten Duyvil, 2022), "Shakespeare & Stein Walk Into a Bar" (Spuyten Duyvil NYC, 2016), Nighthawks (Spuyten Duyvil NYC, 2014) and Cloud Fire (Spuyten Duyvil NYC, 2012).

== Life ==
Hastings grew up in the Cow Hollow neighborhood of San Francisco, a city that has deeply influenced her work. She lived in Sonoma County, California, for several decades where she served as Sonoma County Poet Laureate (2014 — 2016). She founded and curated the WordTemple Poetry Series for a dozen years and WordTemple Arts & Lectures. Poets who have read in the series include Robert Hass, Jane Hirshfield, Carolyn Kizer, Ishmael Reed, Jane Mead, David St. John, David Meltzer, Diane DiPrima, August Kleinzahler, Colleen McElroy, Dana Gioia, Ilya Kaminsky, Al Young, Michael McClure, Susan Griffin, Judy Grahn, Brenda Hillman, Kay Ryan, Ellen Bass, Paul Hoover, Camille Dungy, Malachi Black, Natalie Diaz, Tomas Morin, Ada Limon and many others. Hastings hosted a radio program, also called WordTemple, on Santa Rosa KRCB 91 FM, an NPR affiliate for a over a decade.

Hastings received her MFA in Writing from Vermont College.

Hastings has had poems published in numerous journals and anthologies, as well as The Book of Forms — A Handbook of Poetics, Lewis Putnam Turco, ed. (University Press of New England, 2012). Journals and anthologies include, but are not limited to, Spillway, The Comstock Review, Roque Dalton Redux (Cedar Hill Press), Rattle, Calyx, California Quarterly, Beatitude — Golden Anniversary, The Ambush Review, Continent of Light (named after her poem), Diner, Birmingham Arts Journal, Potpourri, New College Review and Parthenon West Review as well as several books, listed below.

Lawrence Ferlinghetti writes of her book Sidhe, "I have read and reread your SIDHE. Lovely...It's your veiled history." Poet and critic Jack Foley says: "Katherine Hastings' SIDHE (pronounced "she") is an illuminating and fanciful exploration of sexual and ethnic identity. It is also great fun. The poem's primary strength is its marvelous openness as ancestral Irish voices mingle suddenly with the voices of the street or with voices from the past. SIDHE is not a homily on how to live a life, but it is a brilliant enactment of how a life may be conceived. The poem posits a ritual of problematical growth in a San Francisco which now exists primarily in Katherine Hastings' imagination. The "Dark mother" who haunts the poem is simultaneously Ireland and the massive feminine figure (what Jung would have called an archetype) which constantly nudges this poet into the most varied of expressions. Call her Hastings' angel and—through the medium of this rich, gorgeous tapestry of a poem—our own."

In 2011, in response to the planned permanent closure of 70 California State Parks due to a budget crisis, Hastings put out a call to poets for poems inspired by State parks and published the anthology What Redwoods Know — Poems from California State Parks. Poets in the anthology include Francisco X. Alarcón, David Beckman, Janine Canan, Ed Coletti, Iris Jamahl-Dunkle, Katherine Hastings, Jodi Hottel, Paula Koneazny, Gail Larrick, Hannah Maggiora, Phyllis Meshulam, Lee Slonimsky and Robert Sward. Readings took place in Sebastopol, San Francisco, in the House of Happy Walls in Jack London State Park (Glen Ellen), Santa Cruz, Sacramento and Windsor, California. All proceeds from book sales were donated to the California State Parks Foundation to support their efforts in keeping State parks open.

Hastings also edited the anthologies "Digging Our Poetic Roots -- Poems from Sonoma County" (2014) and "Know Me Here -- Poetry by Women" (2017). Some of the poets in this anthology include Jane Hirshfield, Mary Mackey, Pui Ying Wong, Jodi Hottel, Brenda Hillman, and many others.

Following the October 2017 wildfires that destroyed almost 6,000 homes overnight in Sonoma and Napa counties, Hastings moved in early 2018 to her partner’s childhood home in Western New York.

== Published works ==
- ”Temple of Curiosities” (Spuyten Duyvil, 2026)
- ”A Different Beauty” (Spuyten Duyvil, 2022)
- "Know Me Here — An Anthology of Poetry by Women", editor, WordTemple Press, 2017)
- "Shakespeare & Stein Walk Into a Bar" (Spuyten Duyvil NYC, 2016)
- Nighthawks (Spuyten Duyvil NYC, 2014)
- Cloud Fire (Spuyten Duyvil NYC, 2012)
- "Digging Our Poetic Roots -- Poems From Sonoma County", editor (2014)
- What Redwoods Know — Poems from California State Parks, editor (2012; All proceeds to California State Parks Foundation)
- Fog and Light (Ahadada Reader 3, Ahadada Books 2011)
- Updraft (Finishing Line Press, 2010)
- Wolf Spider (dPress, 2005)
- Sidhe (dPress, 2006)
- Lonidier Rampant (The Small Change Series, WordTemple Press, 2007)
- Bird. Song. Knife. Heart. (The Small Change Series, WordTemple Press, 2008)
