= Plato and a Platypus Walk Into a Bar =

Book by Thomas Cathcart

Plato and a Platypus Walk Into a Bar – Understanding Philosophy Through Jokes
- Penguin paperback Cover
- Author: Thomas Cathcart and Daniel Klein
- Cover artist: Paul Buckley
- Genre: Comedy
- Publisher: Abrams Image (hardcover); Penguin Group (paperback)
- Publication date: May 1, 2007
- Publication place: United States
- Pages: 208
- ISBN: 978-0-8109-1493-3
- OCLC: 71312724
- Dewey Decimal: 102/.07 22
- LC Class: BD31 .C38 2006

Plato and a Platypus Walk Into a Bar – Understanding Philosophy Through Jokes is a 2007 book by Thomas Wilson Cathcart and Daniel Martin Klein that explains several philosophical concepts with the help of jokes that serve to illustrate the points in the book.

The concept behind the book in the Introduction: "The construction and payoff of jokes and the construction and payoff of philosophical concepts are made out of the same stuff. They tease the mind in the same ways…philosophy and jokes proceed from the same impulse: to confound our sense of the way things are, to flip our worlds upside down, and to ferret out hidden, often uncomfortable, truths about life. What the philosopher calls an insight, the gagster calls a zinger."

== Background ==
In an interview with NPR host Liane Hansen, Klein stated that when he and Cathcart were studying philosophy at university, they noticed many similarities to the structure of jokes, which lead to the idea for the book. He hoped readers of the book would come away "with a good general background" of the subject, stating "it's kind of [like] Philosophy 101".

== Summary ==
The book is split up into several chapters, each covering a different branch of philosophy, such as metaphysics or epistemology. Each chapter is structured through exploring a series of concepts related to the branch of philosophy, usually beginning with a description of the concept, a joke, and an explanation of the joke. At the beginning and end of each chapter, a gag between two characters named Dimitri and Tasso is also featured.

=== Quote from the book ===
"A guy comes home from a business trip and finds his wife in bed, a nervous look on her face. He opens the closet to hang up his coat, and finds his best friend standing there, naked. Stunned, he says, "Lenny, what are you doing here?" Lenny shrugs and says, "Everybody's got to be someplace."

In this gag, Lenny is giving a Hegelian answer to an existential question. The question is about the existential circumstances in the here-and-now, but the answer is from a grand, universal vantage point, what the latter-day Hegelian Bette Midler called “seeing the world from a distance."

== Reception ==
In a review for Philosophy Now, Tim Madigan noted that the book was "a pleasure to read", saying that its jokes "shamelessly illustrate many of the main points of philosophy" and while questioning if it and similar books alone would be "sufficiently explanatory", still recommended it.

== Sequels ==
A successor, Aristotle and an Aardvark Go to Washington, was published on January 1, 2008, and uses the same structure and theme of the first book to explore a variety of logical fallacies, using statements from prominent American political figures as examples.
