= Furiously Happy =

2015 book by Jenny Lawson

- Author: Jenny Lawson
- Language: English
- Subject: Mental Illness
- Genre: Humor
- Publisher: Flatiron Books
- Publication date: 2015
- Publication place: USA
- Media type: Print
- Pages: 329
- ISBN: 978-1-250-07700-4

Furiously Happy is the second book written by the humorist Jenny Lawson. A continuation of her previous autobiography Let's Pretend This Never Happened, this book deals more directly with Lawson's experience with mental illness, depression and anxiety.

The title refers to Lawson's philosophy of being "furiously happy" after becoming so depressed that she eventually decided to force herself to be happy out of frustration and spite, driving herself to adventures and experiences in order to build happy memories to sustain her through bouts of depression. This propels her to do such things as travel to Australia in order to hug a koala while wearing a koala suit, to wear a fancy ballgown on ordinary occasions in order to feel beautiful, and to connect with people in the real world in spite of painful physical ability and severe social anxiety. She also related experiences of other mentally ill people who have gone on their own adventures after being inspired by her.
