= Hattie Dalton =

Australian filmmaker

Hattie Dalton is an Australian filmmaker who won a BAFTA award for best live-action short film for her 2004 film The Banker, starring Michael Sheen. She also directed 2010 feature film Third Star starring Benedict Cumberbatch.

== Biography ==
She began her career in broadcast journalism, then worked for ten years as a film editor.

Her first short, Sick, was made in 2004.

== The Banker ==
The Banker is a 2004 live-action film which won the BAFTA Award for Best Short Film. It was written and directed by Dalton and starred Michael Sheen as a lovelorn scientist working in a sperm bank.

The film was made by Dalton's company Memory Box Films and produced by Kelly Broad. After the Australian Film Commission refused to fund the film, saying the script "did not resonate", Dalton and Broad raised the $A35,860 budget themselves, including donations from family, the star Sheen, and executive producer Trudie Styler. The production designer was Sydney artist Jason Synott and the theme song was by Doug Christian.

As well as the BAFTA win, it was nominated for best short film at the 2005 Chicago International Film Festival, and placed 3rd in the TCM prize at the 2005 London Film Festival.

== One of these Days ==
Dalton went on to direct another short, One of these Days (2009), starring Derek Jacobi. It was made by her company Memory Box Films for BBC Films, with additional finance from Elton John's film company Rocket Pictures. It won best short film at Sitges Film Festival.

== Third Star ==
Her first feature film was Third Star (2010) starring Benedict Cumberbatch.
