= Why Not Me? (Kaling book) =

2015 humor book by Mindy Kaling

- First edition
- Author: Mindy Kaling
- Language: English
- Genre: Memoir
- Publisher: Crown Archetype
- Publication place: United States
- Pages: 240
- ISBN: 978-0-8041-3814-7
- Preceded by: Is Everyone Hanging Out Without Me? (And Other Concerns)
- Followed by: Nothing Like I Imagined

Why Not Me? is a 2015 humor book by actress and writer Mindy Kaling. The book consists mostly of humorous observational essays based on Kaling's life, and it also includes one chapter of fiction.

The book spent 16 weeks on The New York Times Best Sellers list.

== Synopsis ==
The book is a collection of anecdotal essays written by Kaling about her experiences and observations about Hollywood. Carina Chocano of The New York Times noted that the book was "loosely fashioned around themes of approval and entitlement."

The book also contains a chapter that is a work of fiction about an alternative world where Kaling is a Latin teacher in a prep school on the Upper East Side of New York.

The final chapter of the book is a transcript of Kaling's 2014 speech at Harvard Law School.

== Reception ==
The book received mostly positive reviews. The Atlantic called the book "a defense of hard work." Publishers Weekly criticized the book for skirting major issues such as her mother's death and relationship with B. J. Novak.
