= Dear Girls =

2019 non-fiction book by Ali Wong

Dear Girls: Intimate Tales, Untold Secrets & Advice for Living Your Best Life
- First edition
- Author: Ali Wong
- Language: English
- Genre: Autobiography; satire; self-help
- Publisher: Random House
- Publication date: October 15, 2019
- Publication place: United States
- Pages: 240
- ISBN: 052550883X

Dear Girls: Intimate Tales, Untold Secrets & Advice for Living Your Best Life is a book by stand-up comedian, actress, and writer Ali Wong. It was released on October 15, 2019, to favorable reviews.

The book is made up of a preface and 14 chapters, written as humorous letters from Wong to her daughters, reflecting on her life and offering advice. An afterword by Wong's husband Justin Hakuta is also written as a letter to their daughters.

In a review for The Washington Post, Rachel Rosenblit said, " 'Dear Girls' can be crude and flippant, LOL-dense and breezy", but also "sneakily thoughtful about the public roles [Wong] occupies — Asian American, working mom, woman on comedy stages — and the come-from-behind grind they necessarily demand… She even offers surprisingly tender takes" on her family life.

Dear Girls won the 2019 Goodreads Choice Award for Humor.
