= Peter Hyman =

American journalist, author, humorist and entrepreneur

Peter Hyman is a former American journalist, author and humorist who now works in the financial services sector. He is the author of The Reluctant Metrosexual: Dispatches from an Almost Hip Life (ISBN 0-8129-7163-9), published in August 2004.
