= Brain Droppings =

1998 book by George Carlin

- Author: George Carlin
- Language: English
- Genre: Humor
- Publisher: Hyperion
- Publication date: May 1, 1998; September 1, 2006 (Reprint)
- Media type: Hardcover; Paperback; Audiobook
- Pages: 272
- ISBN: 978-0-7868-9112-2
- OCLC: 150351163
- Preceded by: Sometimes a Little Brain Damage Can Help
- Followed by: Napalm and Silly Putty

Brain Droppings is the second book written by comedian George Carlin, published in 1998.

This was Carlin's "first real book" and contains much of Carlin's stand-up comedy material. According to the cover, the book contains "jokes, notions, doubts, opinions, questions, thoughts, beliefs, assertions, assumptions, and disturbing references" and "comedy, nonsense, satire, mockery, merriment, sarcasm, ridicule, silliness, bluster, and toxic alienation". For longtime Carlin fans, the book also contains complete versions of two of his most famous monologues, "A Place for My Stuff" and "Baseball and Football".

The hardcover edition was on the New York Times Best Seller List for 18 weeks straight. The following year, the paperback edition was published. It stayed on the New York Times Best Seller List for 20 weeks. Both editions were published by Hyperion.

As of 2008, the book had sold nearly 900,000 total copies.

Writer and television commentator Mike Barnicle supposedly lifted material from the book, without accreditation, and presented it as his own. Barnicle denied having read the book, but footage of him Barnicle praising Brain Droppings saying "There's a yuk on every page," turned up. Barnicle was suspended for the action.

In August 1998, Hyperion published a 1999 calendar containing quips and quotes from the book.

In May 2000, the book was published as an audiobook by HighBridge, in both CD and cassette tape formats. The audiobook received a Grammy Award, Carlin's third, in February 2001.

== Differences in audiobook ==
Since there was a 3-year gap between the printed book and the audiobook, a few things were changed due to changes in both Carlin's personal life and in the world in general.

- His wife, Brenda, died shortly after the book was published, so in the audiobook he said "I've had a great marriage..." instead of "I have..."
- He mentions being happy the Yankees annihilated the Braves in the World Series in the book, but mentions it happened twice in the audiobook, as the two teams played again in 1999.
- In mentioning teams who could never quite win the big title after so many years, he mentions the Vikings, the Broncos, the Bills, the Cubs, and the Red Sox in the book. In the audiobook, he omits the Broncos because they had subsequently won two Super Bowls.
- At the end of his discussion of when super celebrities die, in the book he says he can't even fathom Frank Sinatra's or Ronald Reagan's death. He omitted Sinatra in the audiobook after he died in 1998.
- In a non-chronological change, in his "Baseball and Football" segment, he adds the weird fact that baseball is the only one of the four major American sports that is sensibly unwatchable in a mirror. (Though this was touched on in one of his "Short Takes" sections.)
