= Jenny Lawson =

American journalist (born 1973)

Jennifer Lawson
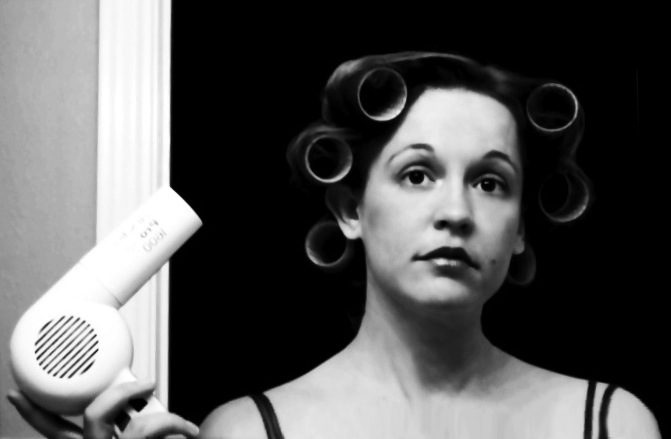
- A self-portrait of Jenny Lawson
- Born: December 29, 1973 (age 52)
- Education: Angelo State University
- Occupations: Journalist, blogger
- Years active: 2006–present
- Spouse: Victor
- Children: Hailey

Jennifer Lawson (born December 29, 1973) is an American journalist, author and blogger.

== Biography ==
Lawson is from Wall, Texas and is a graduate of Angelo State University. She is the author of The Bloggess website and formerly wrote the Ill Advised blog, co-authored Good Mom/Bad Mom on the Houston Chronicle, and was a columnist for SexIs magazine. Lawson is well known for her irreverent writing style. She also used to write an advice column called "Ask The Bloggess" for The Personal News Network (PNN.com) until she quit because they stopped paying her. She lives with rheumatoid arthritis, depression, anxiety, avoidant personality disorder, and mild obsessive–compulsive disorder.

Lawson was recognized by the Nielsen ratings as one of the Top 50 Most Powerful Mom Bloggers and Forbes listed thebloggess.com as one of their Top 100 Websites for Women. She was a finalist in the 2010 Weblog awards for Best Writing and Most Humorous Writer, and a finalist in the 2011 Weblog awards for Best Writing, Most Humorous Writer and Weblog of the Year. In 2011 The Huffington Post named her the "Greatest Person of the Day" for her work in raising money for struggling families in December 2010. She was also interviewed on CBC News Network's Connect with Mark Kelley during the fundraising campaign.

=== Books ===
Lawson's autobiography called Let's Pretend This Never Happened was released on April 17, 2012, by Amy Einhorn Books. On May 6, 2012, it was the number one New York Times bestseller. The book named Best Humor book in the 2012 Goodreads Choice Awards.

Her second book, Furiously Happy, was released on September 22, 2015. It is a humorous look at Lawson's experience with depression and anxiety disorder, and it debuted in the number 3 spot of New York Times Bestseller list on October 11, 2015. It reached number one on the New York Times Bestseller list on July 3, 2016. The audiobook of Furiously Happy, narrated by Lawson, won an Audie Award for best humor audiobook in 2016.

Lawson's third book, YOU ARE HERE: An Owner's Manual For Dangerous Minds, was released in March 2017. It is an adult coloring book/advice book illustrated and written by the author, and it debuted in the number 2 spot of New York Times Bestseller list on March 26, 2017.

In August 2020, Lawson announced on her blog, The Bloggess, that she would release her next memoir, Broken (in the Best Possible Way), in 2021. It debuted in the number 3 spot of the New York Times bestseller list on April 25, 2021. Broken was awarded Best Humor Book of the Year in the 2021 Goodreads Choice Awards.

In March 2026, Lawson published her 5th book, How To Be Okay When Nothing Is Okay. The book debuted in the number 4 spot on the New York Times Bestseller List on April 19, 2026.

=== Nowhere Bookshop ===
In 2019, Lawson opened an independent bookstore and bar, Nowhere Bookshop, in San Antonio, Texas. It was given the 2023 readers' choice award for Best Bookstore in San Antonio by San Antonio Magazine.
