= Napalm and Silly Putty =

2001 book by George Carlin

- Front cover
- Author: George Carlin
- Language: English
- Genre: Humor
- Publisher: Hyperion Books
- Publication date: April 24, 2001
- Media type: Hardcover; Paperback; Audiobook
- Pages: 272
- ISBN: 978-0-7868-6413-3
- OCLC: 45446353
- Dewey Decimal: 818/.5402 21
- LC Class: PN6162 .C276 2001
- Preceded by: Brain Droppings
- Followed by: When Will Jesus Bring the Pork Chops?

Napalm and Silly Putty is the third book written by comedian George Carlin, published in 2001.

== Background ==
This book contains much of Carlin's stand-up comedy material. The title derives from one of the observations in the book: Carlin finds it interesting that the same race can invent something as fun and innocent as Silly Putty and something as deadly as napalm — the two have many similar properties. The title is also an allusion to the type of thoughts that occupy his time, saying, "on one hand I kinda like it when a lot of people die, but on the other hand, I always wonder how many unused frequent-flyer miles they had."

== Reception ==
The hardcover edition of Napalm and Silly Putty was on New York Times Best Seller list for 20 straight weeks. The following year, the paperback edition was published. Both editions were published by Hyperion Books.

As of April 2002, the hardcover edition had sold over 375,000 total copies.

== Other versions ==
The audiobook was released abridged in two parts: Napalm and Silly Putty in April 2001 and More Napalm and Silly Putty in April 2002. The audiobook received a Grammy Award, Carlin's fourth, in February 2002. The audiobook edition was published by HighBridge Audio, an imprint of Recorded Books.
