= Daniel Martin Klein =

American writer (born 1939)

- Born: 1939 (age 86–87) Wilmington, Delaware, U.S.
- Occupation: Writer
- Education: Harvard University (BA)
- Genres: Fiction; non-fiction
- Spouse: Freke Quirine Vuijst (died 2020)
- Children: 1

Daniel Martin Klein (born 1939 in Wilmington, Delaware) is an American writer of fiction, non-fiction, and humor. His most notable works are Plato and a Platypus Walk Into a Bar co-written with Thomas Cathcart. and Travels With Epicurus.

== Life ==
Klein went to school at Harvard College where he received a B.A. in philosophy. After a brief career in television comedy, he began writing books, ranging from thrillers and mysteries to humorous books about philosophy, including the New York Times bestseller, Plato and a Platypus Walk Into a Bar: Understanding Philosophy Through Jokes (with Thomas Cathcart) and the London Times bestseller Travels With Epicurus. He lives in Great Barrington, Massachusetts, and was married to Freke Quirine Vuijst (1952-2020) until her death from cancer . She was the American correspondent for the Dutch newsweekly, Vrij Nederland. Their daughter, Samara Quirine Klein, is Head librarian for the towns of Great Barrington and Housatonic MA.

== Awards ==
‘ForeWord Magazine' Book of the Year – Silver Award in Literary Fiction (2009) for novel, 'The History of Now'.

== List of books ==
=== Non-fiction ===
- The Half-Jewish Book: A Celebration (with Freke Vuijst), Villard, 2000. ISBN 0375503854
- Plato and a Platypus Walk Into a Bar: Understanding Philosophy Through Jokes, (with Thomas Cathcart), Abrams Books, 2007. ISBN 081091493X
- Aristotle and an Aardvark Go to Washington: Understanding Political Doublespeak through Philosophy and Jokes, (with Thomas Cathcart), Abrams Books, 2008. ISBN 0810995417
- Heidegger and a Hippo Walk Through Those Pearly Gates: Using Philosophy (and Jokes!) to Explore Life, Death, the Afterlife, and Everything in Between, (with Thomas Cathcart), Viking, 2009. ISBN 0670020834
- Travels with Epicurus: A Journey to a Greek Island in Search of a Fulfilled Life, Penguin, 2012. ISBN 0143121936
- Every Time I Find the Meaning of Life, They Change It: Wisdom of the Great Philosophers on How to Live, Penguin, 2015. ISBN 0143126792
- I Think, Therefore I Draw: Understanding Philosophy Through Cartoons (with Thomas Cathcart), Penguin, 2018. ISBN 978-0143133025

=== Thrillers and Mysteries ===
- Embryo, Doubleday, 1980. ISBN 0445046880
- Wavelengths, Doubleday, 1982. ISBN 0385174454
- Beauty Sleep, St. Martin's, 1990. ISBN 0312042647
- Kill Me Tender, St. Martin's Minotaur, 2002. ISBN 0312981953
- Blue Suede Clues, St. Martin's Minotaur, 2003. ISBN 0312986696
- Viva Las Vengeance, St. Martin's Minotaur, 2003. ISBN 0312288069
- Such Vicious Minds, St. Martin's Minotaur, 2004 ISBN 0312319401

=== Novels ===
- Nothing Serious, Permanent Press, 2013. ISBN 978-1579623142
- The History of Now, Permanent Press, 2009. ISBN 1579621813
- Magic Time, Doubleday, 1984. ISBN 0385174527

=== Plays ===
- The Jewish Jester, New Stage Performing Arts, Berkshire Theater Festival, Stockbridge, MA, 2013
- Mengelberg and Mahler, Shakespeare & Company, Lenox, MA, 2010

== Book reviews ==
=== Nothing Serious ===
- Kirkus described the book as follows: "A hip editor takes the helm of Cogito, a stodgy philosophical journal, with mixed—and occasionally hilarious—results."
- New York Journal of Books reviewer Karl Wolff wrote, “. . . a rollicking farce . . . a tightly plotted comedic tale with a genuine emotional center and a sharp satirical wit.”
