= Stephen Hilton =

British composer (born 1974)

- Born: Stephen Dean Hilton; February 7, 1974 (age 52); England
- Occupations: Composer, record producer
- Spouse(s): Pati Yang (m.?; div.?); Laura Clery (m. 2012; div. 2023)

Stephen Dean Hilton (February 7, 1974) is an English composer and record producer.

== Musical career ==
=== The Free Association ===
Hilton was a member of The Free Association with David Holmes. Together as a band of composers and producers they scored the futuristic love story, Code 46, directed by Michael Winterbottom. This resulted in a nomination for European Composer of the Year at the European Movie Awards. The Free Association also scored Bronwen Hughes' film Stander, based on a true story about South African chief of police in 1979.

The band's music features on a variety of car adverts, including a Renault Clio Campaign (UK) and a VW Campaign (Germany & Turkey). Other repertoire has been licensed to CSI (the American crime drama series) amongst other TV series.

=== FlyKKller ===
With singer Pati Yang he did a project called FlyKKiller.

== Personal life ==
Hilton's first wife was musician Pati Yang.

Hilton married his second wife, internet celebrity and comedian Laura Clery in 2012 and appeared frequently in her videos. The couple had two children together. Hilton and Clery divorced in 2023.

== Credits ==
=== Scores (as composer) ===
2003

- Stander - Composer
- Code 46 - Composer

2011

- Transformers 3: Dark of the Moon – additional music

2012

- Madagascar 3: Europe's Most Wanted - Producer of songs / Additional music / Arranger
- "The 84th Annual Academy Awards" - Additional music / Arranger

2013

- Fast And Furious 6 - Additional music / Arranger

2014

- The Pyramid Texts - Composer
- Kill Command - Composer
- Sword of Vengeance - Composer
- The Big Leaf - Composer
- Hungry (Season 2) -Composer
- The Amazing Spiderman 2 - Composer / Additional music / Arranger
- Counting Backwrds - Composer
- Drugs INC - Composer

2016

- Kong Skull Island - Composer / Additional music
- Jack Reacher Never Go Back – composer additional music

2017

- The Predator - Composer additional music
- Romans - Composer

=== Scores (as composer) ===
1999

- The World Is Not Enough
- The Bone Collector
- Plunkett & Macleane
- Best Laid Plans

2000

- Shaft

2001

- Buffalo Soldiers as musician: keyboards (as Steve Hilton)
- Ocean's Eleven as music programmer
- Kiss of the Dragon as music programmer - musician: keyboards
- Moulin Rouge! as music programmer

2002

- Enough Uncredited - as musician: programming and keyboards
- Analyze That as music programmer
- Die Another Day as music programmer

2004

- Ocean's Twelve as music programmer - musician: keyboards

2005

- Four Brothers as music programmer

2007

- Ocean's Thirteen as music programmer - musician: keyboards
- Hot Fuzz as music programmer - musician: keyboards
- A Mighty Heart as music programmer - musician: keyboards

2008

- Quantum of Solace as music programmer - musician: keyboards and programming (As Steve Hilton)
- How To Lose Friends and Alienate People as musician: programming and keyboards

2010

- Megamind as additional music arranger - music arranger
- How Do You Know as music arranger

2011

- "The Dilemma" as music arranger
- "Kung Fu Panda 2" as additional music arranger
- "Haywire" as music arranger (uncredited)
- "Assassin's Creed: Revelations" as additional music arranger

2012

- "The 84th Annual Academy Awards" as music arranger
- "Wrath of the Titans" keyboards, programming and remix
- "Madagascar 3 Europes Most Wanted" as additional music arranger - composer: additional music
- "Savages" as musician: programming and keyboards

2013

- "Kick Ass 2" (rmx)
- "47 Ronin" as keyboards: beats and programming
- "The Great Gatsby"
- GI Joe 2: Retaliation

2015

- Kung Fu Panda 3 – additional music

=== Music producer credits ===
1992

- The John Spencer Blues Explosion – Blues Explosion

1998

- Depeche Mode – Only When I Lose Myself

1999

- Pet Shop Boys – Nightlife ("In Denial")

2002

- Pulp – We Love Life (5 tracks)

2003

- Melanie C – Reason ("Home")
- Martina Topley-Bird – Quixotic ("Steve's (Day's of a Gun)")
- Moloko – Things To Make And Do ("The Time Is Now")

2004

- The John Spencer Blues Explosion – Damage ("Spoiled", "You Been My Baby")

2005

- Natasha Bedingfield – “I Bruise Easily” (4 track single)
- Doves – Black and White Town

=== Work as composer/songwriter ===
- National Movie Awards Theme
- Flykkllr – Album
- Siouxsie Sioux – Drone Zone
- David Holmes – Forthcoming Album
- Pati Yang – Silent Treatment
- Pati Yang – All That Is Thirst
- Free Association – David Holmes Presents The Free Association
- Free Association – Come Get It, Got It
- Craig Armstrong – Amber
- Craig Armstrong – Starless
- Craig Armstrong – Ruthless Gravity
- Children – Sell My Pulse

=== Remixes ===
- No Doubt – Settle Down
- No Doubt – Lookin Hot
- Siouxsie Sioux – Here Comes That Day
- Primal Scream – Uptown
- Craig Armstrong – Glasgow
- Orbital – Gobsmack
- Kharma 45's – Political Soul
- Jacob Fletcher – Don't Go Down
- Answering Machine – Silent Hotels
- The 45 King – The 900 Number
