= Wall, Texas =

Wall
- Unincorporated community
- Location within the state of Texas Wall (the United States)
- Coordinates: 31°22′27″N 100°18′27″W
- Country: United States
- State: Texas
- County: Tom Green

Population (2000)
  - Total: 200
- Time zone: UTC-6 (Central (CST))
  - Summer (DST): UTC-5 (CDT)
- GNIS feature ID: 1370774

Wall is an unincorporated community in Tom Green County, Texas, United States. According to the Handbook of Texas, the community had an estimated population of 200 in 2000. The community is part of the San Angelo, Texas Metropolitan Statistical Area.

== Geography ==
Wall is located in Tom Green County, Texas.

== History ==
The area was known by several different names (Lipan School, Little School, and Murray's Store) after it was settled in the mid-1880s. The community was named Wall after James Madison Wall Sr., a shopkeeper who served as postmaster after the town's post office opened in 1906. Wall served as a trading center for the fertile Lipan Flat region. The population stood at roughly 250 in 1920, 120 through the 1930s and 1940s, and had slightly risen to around 200 during the latter half of the 20th century.

The community currently supports several businesses and a post office (zip code: 76957), and a school.

Author Jenny Lawson's bestselling memoir Let's Pretend This Never Happened discusses growing up in Wall, Texas.

== Education ==
Public education in the community of Wall is provided by the Wall Independent School District, which also serves the surrounding rural areas of southeastern Tom Green County.
