= List of public universities in Japan =

As of March 2023, there were 98 public universities (公立大学, kouritsu daigaku). In 2004, the public university system underwent partial privatization. Since 2004, most public universities have been incorporated as a "public university corporation" (公立大学法人, kouritsu daigaku hōjin). As of March 2023, there were 3 public "graduate university" (大学院大学, daigakuin daigaku).

The following is a complete list of Japanese public graduate universities:

1. Advanced Institute of Industrial Technology
2. Institute of Advanced Media Arts and Sciences
3. Shizuoka Graduate University of Public Health

The following is a complete list of Japanese public universities:

1. Aichi Prefectural University
2. Aichi Prefectural University of Fine Arts and Music
3. Akita International University
4. Akita Prefectural University
5. Akita University of Art
6. Aomori Public University
7. Aomori University of Health and Welfare
8. Asahikawa City University
9. Chiba Prefectural University of Health Sciences
10. Chitose Institute of Science and Technology
11. Ehime Prefectural University of Health Science
12. Eikei University of Hiroshima
13. Fukui Prefectural University
14. Fukuoka Prefectural University
15. Fukuoka Women's University
16. Fukushima Medical University
17. Fukuyama City University
18. Future University Hakodate
19. Gifu College of Nursing
20. Gifu Pharmaceutical University
21. Gunma Prefectural College of Health Sciences
22. Gunma Prefectural Women's University
23. Hiroshima City University
24. Ibaraki Prefectural University of Health Sciences
25. Ishikawa Prefectural Nursing University
26. Ishikawa Prefectural University
27. Iwate Prefectural University
28. Kagawa Prefectural College of Health Sciences
29. Kanagawa University of Human Services
30. Kanazawa College of Art
31. Kawasaki City College of Nursing
32. Kobe City College of Nursing
33. Kobe City University of Foreign Studies
34. Kochi University of Technology
35. Kochi Women's University
36. Komatsu University
37. Kushiro Public University of Economics
38. Kyoto City University of Arts
39. Kyoto Prefectural University
40. Kyoto Prefectural University of Medicine
41. Kyushu Dental University
42. Maebashi Institute of Technology
43. Meio University
44. Mie Prefectural College of Nursing
45. Miyagi University
46. Miyazaki Municipal University
47. Miyazaki Prefectural Nursing University
48. Nagano College of Nursing
49. Nagano University
50. Nagaoka Institute of Design
51. Nagoya City University
52. Nara Medical University
53. Nara Prefectural University
54. Nayoro City University
55. Niigata College of Nursing
56. Niimi University
57. Oita University of Nursing and Health Sciences
58. Okayama Prefectural University
59. Okinawa Prefectural College of Nursing
60. Okinawa Prefectural University of Arts
61. Onomichi City University
62. Osaka Metropolitan University
63. Prefectural University of Hiroshima
64. Prefectural University of Kumamoto
65. Saitama Prefectural University
66. Sanjo City University
67. Sanyo-Onoda City University
68. Sapporo City University
69. Sapporo Medical University
70. Shimonoseki City University
71. Shizuoka University of Art and Culture
72. Shunan University
73. Suwa University of Science
74. Takasaki City University of Economics
75. The University of Aizu
76. The University of Fukuchiyama
77. The University of Kitakyushu
78. The University of Nagano
79. The University of Shiga Prefecture
80. The University of Shimane
81. Tokyo Metropolitan University
82. Tottori University of Environmental Studies
83. Toyama Prefectural University
84. Tsuruga Nursing University
85. Tsuru University
86. University of Hyogo
87. University of Nagasaki
88. University of Niigata Prefecture
89. University of Shizuoka
90. Wakayama Medical University
91. Yamagata Prefectural University of Health Sciences
92. Yamagata Prefectural Yonezawa University of Nutrition Sciences
93. Yamaguchi Prefectural University
94. Yamanashi Prefectural University
95. Yokohama City University

== See also ==
- Public university
- Education in Japan
- List of universities in Japan
