= Going Broke Universities – Disappearing Universities =

Japanese university ranking

The Going Broke Universities – Disappearing Universities (危ない大学・消える大学 Abunai Daigaku Kieru Daigaku) is a ranking book about Japanese universities by Japanese journalist Kiyoshi Shimano, published annually since 1993.

Although there are several university rankings in Japan, most of them rank universities by their entrance difficulties often called "Hensachi" or by alumni's successes. Especially, the Hensachi Rankings have been most commonly used for university ranking. From this view point, GBUDU is a typical ranking book in Japan.

The GBUDU ranks Japanese universities in terms of the entrance difficulty and selectivity. The author's main argument is that more selective universities have better quality, and generally guarantee students better future careers. Thus people should avoid least selective universities, and try to enter more selective ones as much as they can.

== Methodology ==
The GBUDU rankings are made by the average scores of Hensachi estimated by Japanese major prep school Yoyogi seminar. Consequently, it can be regarded as a summary of the selectivity of Japanese universities.

He prepared the following 10 scales to measure universities' entrance difficulties.

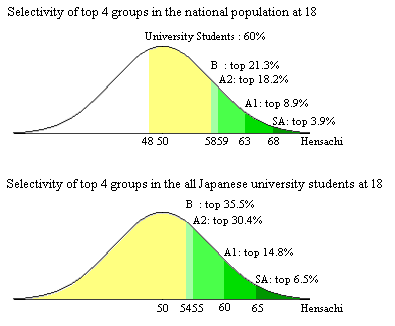
Selectivity of SA, A1, A2, and B groups.

SA	Most selective	15
A1	Very selective (Upper 1st class)	46
A2	Very selective (Lower 1st class)	149
B	Selective (Almost equivalent to 1st class)	22
C	Upper middle class	
D	Middle class	
E	Lower middle class / He defined it as the minimum level of universities that student should enter	
F	Lower class	
G	Lower class	
N	Least selective / The candidate universities for "Going broke universities" or "Disappearing universities"	
Total		778

== 2010 rankings ==
The following data is the 2010 ranking table only in Rank SA (1st), Rank A1 (2nd), Rank A2 (3rd) and Rank B (4th) even though there are additionally Rank C, Rank D, Rank E, Rank F, Rank G, Rank N, Rank "on hold" and others (from the higher to the lower).

Overall Rank 2010	Region	National Universities (Alphabetical order)	Public Universities (Alphabetical order)	Private Universities (Alphabetical order)
SA	Hokkaido	Hokkaido University		
SA	Tohoku	Tohoku University		
SA	Kanto	Hitotsubashi University / Ochanomizu University / Tokyo Institute of Technology / Tokyo University of Foreign Studies / University of Tokyo		International Christian University / Keio University / Sophia University / Waseda University
SA	Chubu	Nagoya University		
SA	Kansai	Kyoto University / Osaka University		
SA	Chugoku			
SA	Shikoku			
SA	Kyushu	Kyushu University		
A1	Hokkaido			
A1	Tohoku	Akita International University		
A1	Kanto	Chiba University / Gunma University / Saitama University / Tokyo Gakugei University / Tokyo University of Agriculture and Technology / University of Tsukuba / Yokohama National University	Gunma Prefectural Women's University / Kanagawa University of Human Services / Saitama Prefectural University / Takasaki City University of Economics / Tokyo Metropolitan University / Yokohama City University	Aoyama Gakuin University / Hosei University / Chuo University / Gakushuin University / Meiji University / Rikkyo University / Tokyo University of Science / Tsuda College
A1	Chubu	Aichi University of Education / Gifu University / Kanazawa University / Nagoya Institute of Technology / Shinshu University	Aichi Prefectural University / Nagoya City University / Tsuru University	
A1	Kansai	Kobe University / Kyoto University of Education / Nara Women's University / Osaka Kyoiku University / Shiga University	Kyoto Prefectural University / Nara Prefectural University / Osaka City University / Osaka Prefecture University	Doshisha University / Kwansei Gakuin University / Ritsumeikan University
A1	Chugoku	Hiroshima University		
A1	Shikoku	Kagawa University		
A1	Kyushu	Kumamoto University / Miyazaki University / Nagasaki University		
A2	Hokkaido	All of the other National Universities	All of the other Public Universities	
A2	Tohoku	All of the other National Universities	All of the other Public Universities	
A2	Kanto	All of the other National Universities	All of the other Public Universities	Gakushuin Women's College / Japan Women's University / Meiji Gakuin University / Seijo University / St. Luke's College of Nursing / Tokyo Woman's Christian University / University of the Sacred Heart
A2	Chubu	All of the other National Universities	All of the other Public Universities	Nanzan University
A2	Kansai	All of the other National Universities	All of the other Public Universities	Doshisha Women's College of Liberal Arts / Kansai University / Kyoto University of Foreign Studies / Kyoto Women's University
A2	Chugoku	All of the other National Universities	All of the other Public Universities	Notre Dame Seishin University
A2	Shikoku	All of the other National Universities	All of the other Public Universities	
A2	Kyushu	All of the other National Universities	All of the other Public Universities	Seinan Gakuin University
B	Hokkaido			
B	Tohoku			
B	Kanto			Dokkyo University / Ferris University / Japanese Red Cross College of Nursing / Kagawa Nutrition University / Kanda University of International Studies / Kokugakuin University / Komazawa University / Mukogawa Women's University / Musashino University / Musashi University / Seikei University / Seisen University / Shibaura Institute of Technology / Shirayuri Women's University / Soka University / Tokyo University of Agriculture
B	Chubu			
B	Kansai			Bukkyo University / Kansai Gaidai University / Kobe College / Konan University / Ryukoku University
B	Chugoku			The Japanese Red Cross Hiroshima College of Nursing
B	Shikoku			
B	Kyushu			
