= GCHS =

GCHS may refer to:

Japan

- Gunma Prefectural College of Health Sciences, Maebashi, Gunma

South Korea

- Geochang High School, Geochang-gun, Gyeongsangnam-do Province

United States

- Gadsden City High School, Gadsden, Alabama
- Gallup Catholic High School, Gallup, New Mexico
- Garden City High School (Kansas), Garden City, Kansas
- Garden City High School (Michigan), Garden City, Michigan
- Garden City High School (New York), Garden City, New York
- Gate City High School, Gate City, Virginia
- Gates County Senior High School, Gatesville, North Carolina
- Gehlen Catholic High School, LeMars, Iowa
- Geibel Catholic High School, Connellsville, Pennsylvania
- George County High School, Lucedale, Mississippi
- Gibault Catholic High School, Waterloo, Illinois
- Giles County High School, Pulaski, Tennessee
- Gilbert Christian High School, Gilbert, Arizona
- Glen Cove High School, Glen Cove, New York
- Grand Canyon High School, Grand Canyon Village, Arizona
- Grant Community High School, Fox Lake, Illinois
- Granville Central High School, Stem, North Carolina
- Grape Creek High School, San Angelo, Texas
- Gray's Creek High School, Hope Mills, North Carolina
- Grayson County High School (Kentucky), Leitchfield, Kentucky
- Green County High School, Greensburg, Kentucky
- Greene Central High School, Greene County, North Carolina
- Greenfield-Central High School, Greenfield, Indiana
- Greenup County High School, Greenup, Kentucky
- Grove City High School, Grove City, Ohio
- Grover Cleveland High School (Buffalo, New York)
- Grover Cleveland High School (Queens), New York City
- Grundy County High School, Coalmont, Tennessee
- Greeley Central High School, Greeley, Colorado
- St. Theodore Guerin High School, Noblesville, Indiana
- Gulf Coast High School, Naples, Florida
