= Fudai (disambiguation) =

Fudai may refer to:

- Fudai, Iwate
- Fudai daimyō
- Kyoto Prefectural University
- Osaka Prefecture University
