= Koshigaya-Laketown Station =

Railway station in Koshigaya, Saitama Prefecture, Japan

JM21 Koshigaya-Laketown Station 越谷レイクタウン駅
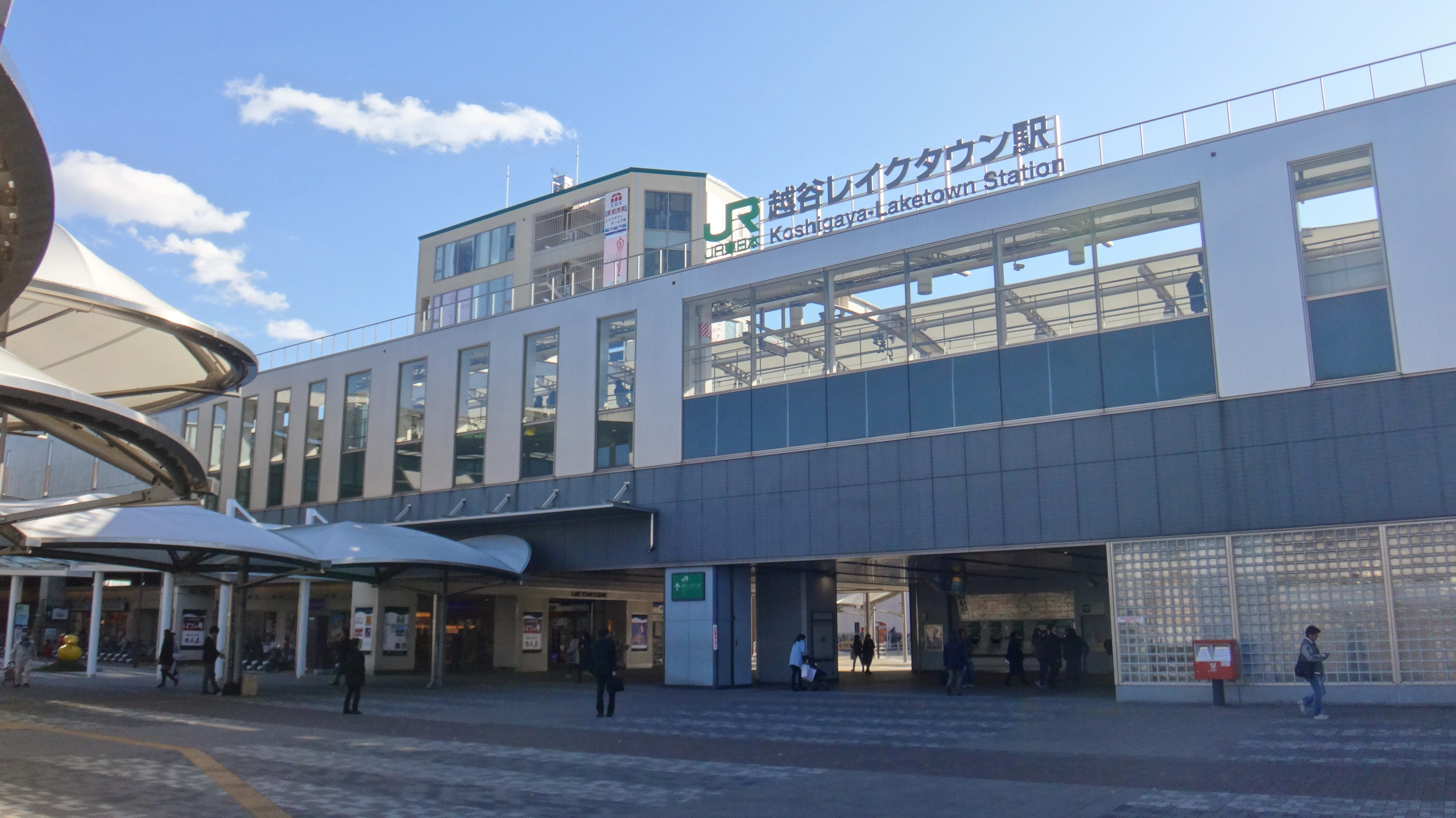
- The north entrance in December 2015

General information
- Location: 8 Laketown, Koshigaya-shi, Saitama-ken 343–0825; Japan
- Coordinates: 35°52′34.6404″N 139°49′21.09″E
- Operator: JR East
- Line: ■ Musashino Line
- Distance: 46.3 km from Fuchūhommachi
- Platforms: 2 side platforms
- Tracks: 2

Other information
- Status: staffed
- Station code: JM21
- Website: Official website

History
- Opened: 15 March 2008

Passengers
- FY2019: 28,675 daily

Services
Preceding station	JR East	Following station
Minami-Koshigaya JM22 towards Ōmiya	Shimōsa	Yoshikawa JM20 towards Kaihimmakuhari
Minami-Koshigaya JM22 towards Fuchūhommachi	Musashino Line	Yoshikawa JM20 towards Kaihimmakuhari or Tokyo
Location
- Location within Saitama Prefecture Location within Japan

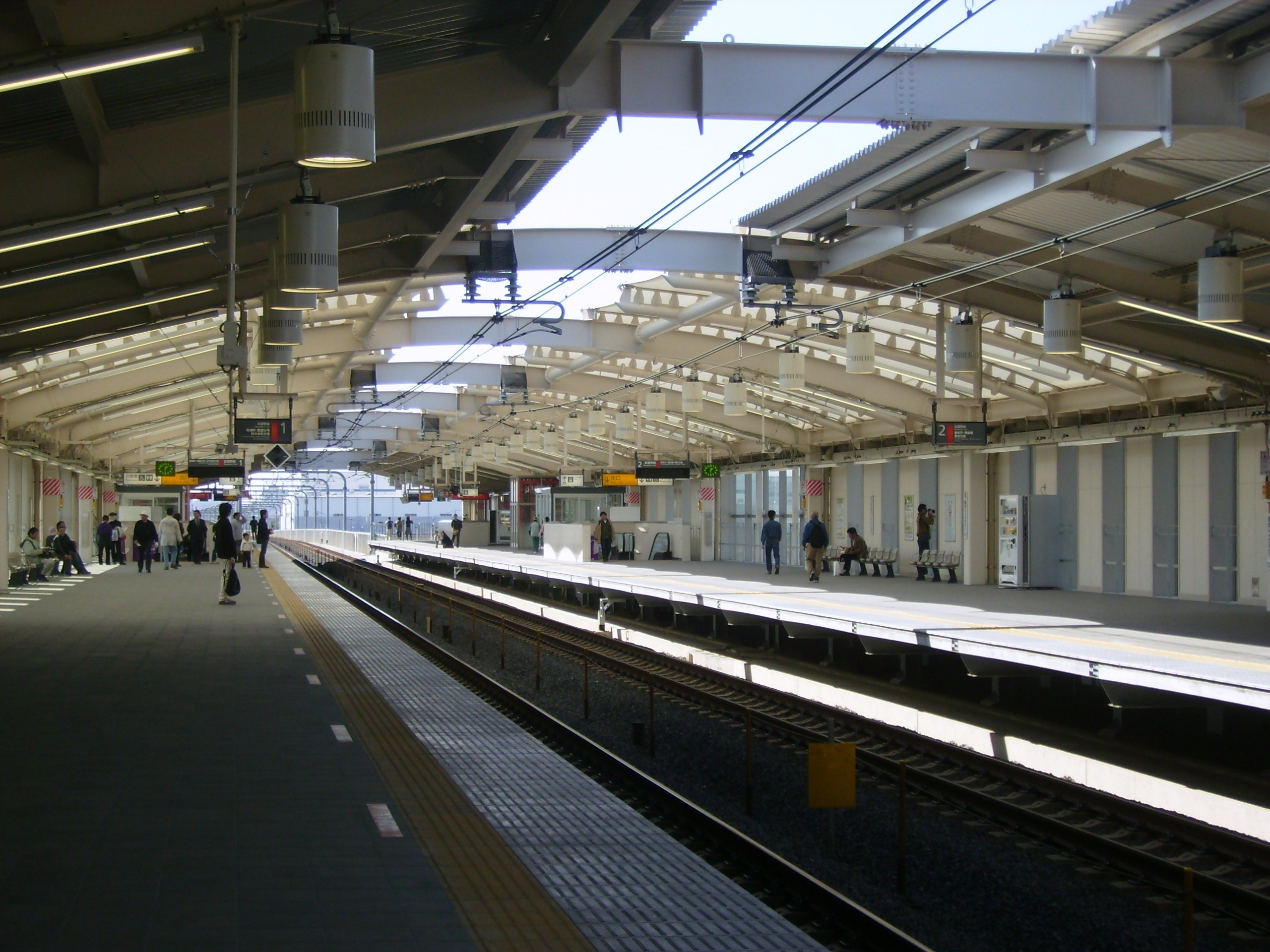
View of the platforms, March 2008

Koshigaya-Laketown Station (越谷レイクタウン駅, Koshigaya-reikutaun-eki) is a passenger railway station located in the city of Koshigaya, Saitama, Japan, operated by East Japan Railway Company (JR East).

== Lines ==
Koshigaya-Laketown Station is served by the orbital Musashino Line from Fuchūhommachi to Nishi-Funabashi and Tokyo. It lies 46.3 km from the starting point of the line at Fuchūhommachi.

== Station layout ==
The elevated station has two opposed side platforms serving two tracks, with the station building located underneath. The station is staffed.

=== Platforms ===
1	Musashino Line	for Minami-Urawa, Musashi-Urawa, Nishi-Kokubunji, and Fuchūhommachi
2	Musashino Line	for Shim-Matsudo, Nishi-Funabashi, Tokyo, and Kaihimmakuhari

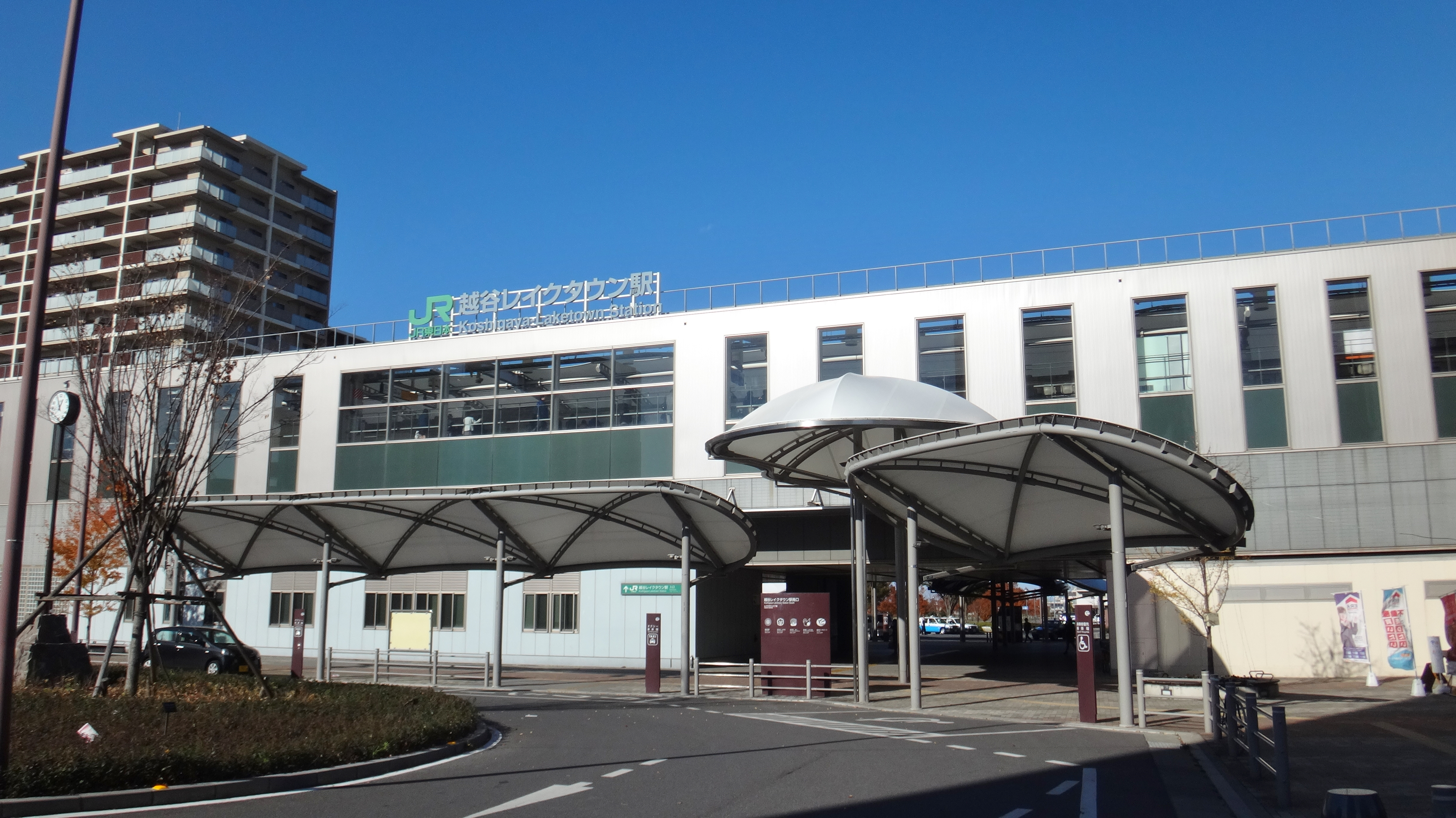
The south entrance in December 2015

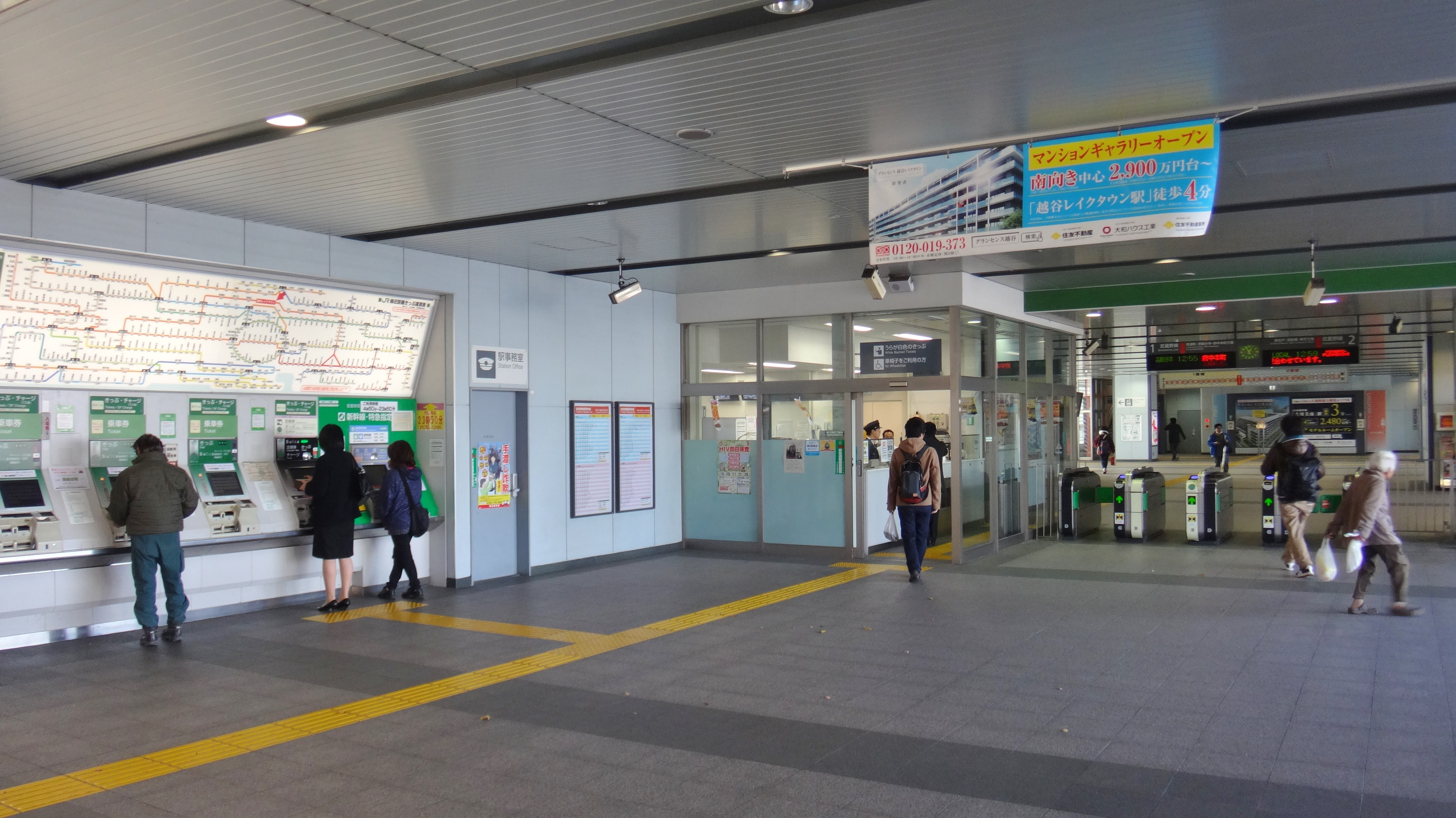
The ticket barriers, December 2015

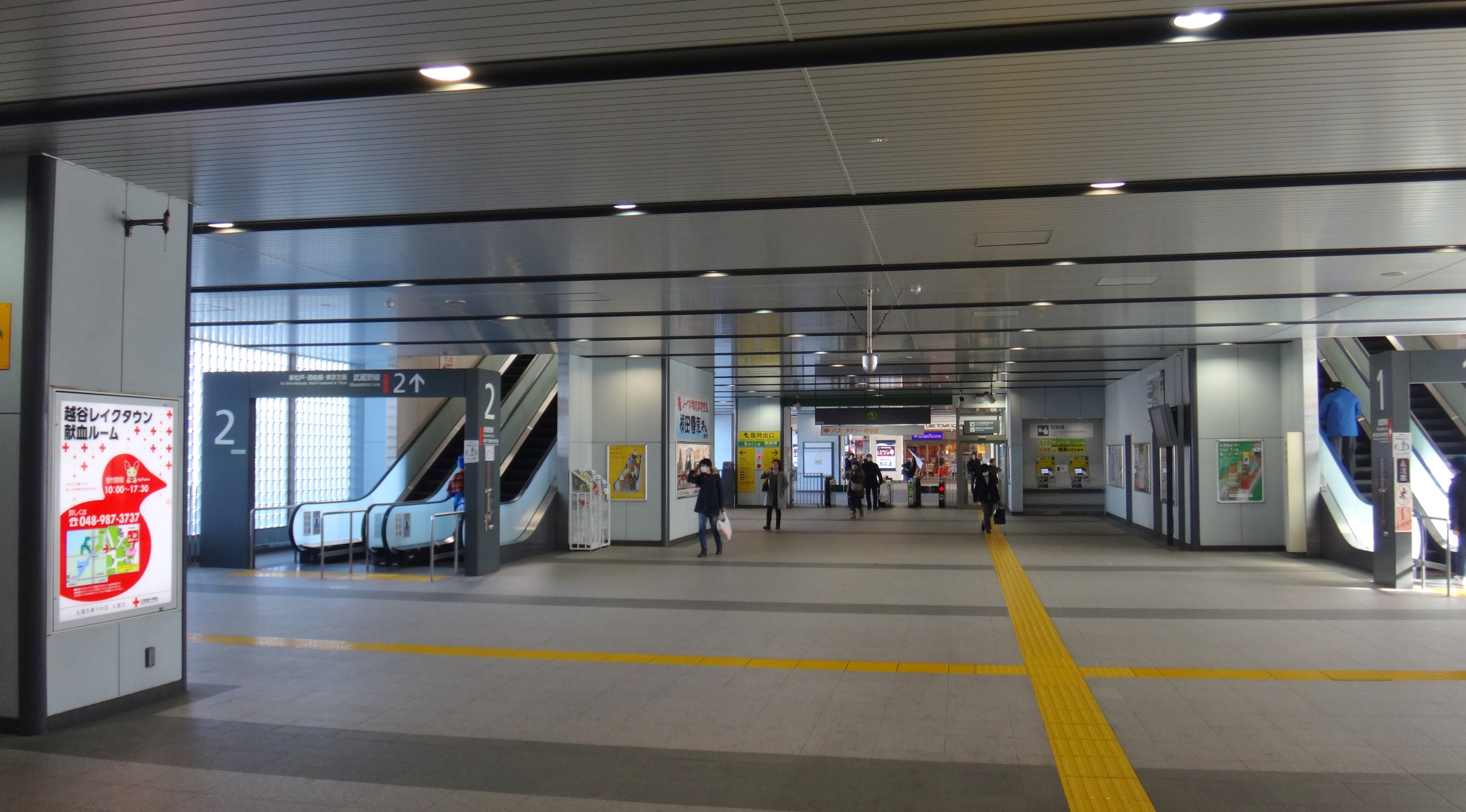
The ground-level concourse, looking back toward the ticket barriers, December 2015

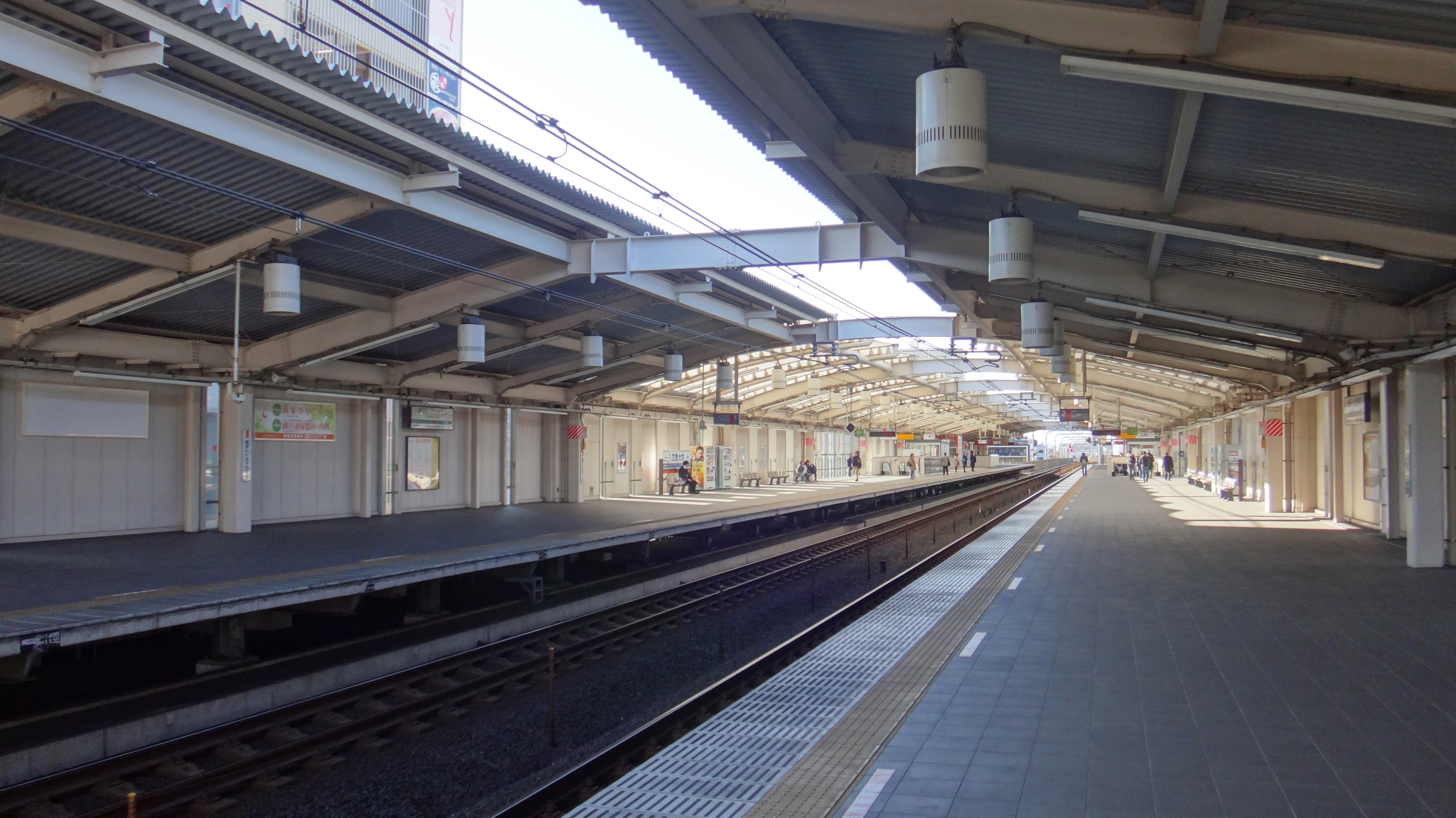
The view from the east end of platform 2, December 2015

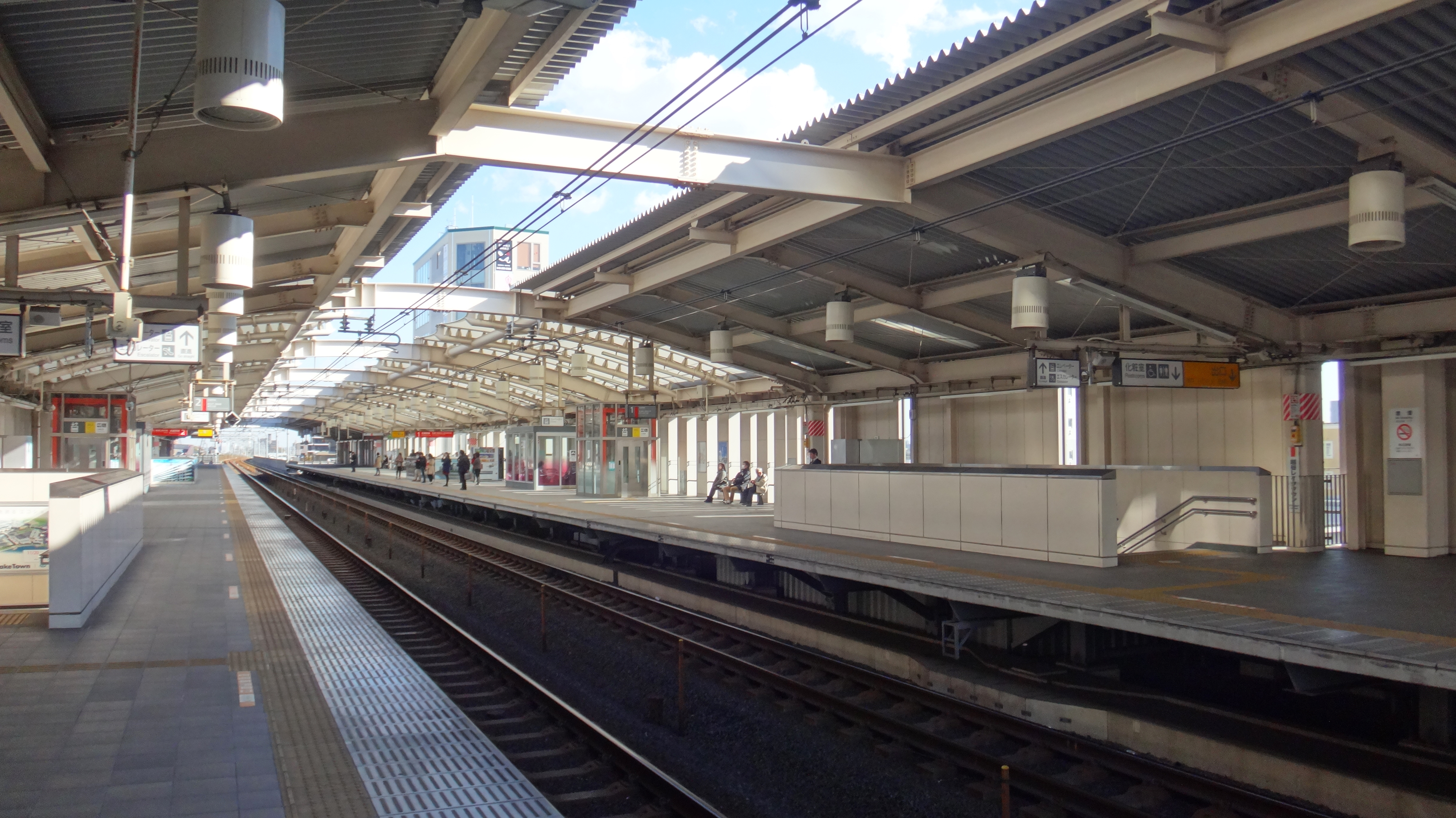
The view from the west end of platform 2, December 2015

== History ==
The station opened on 15 March 2008.

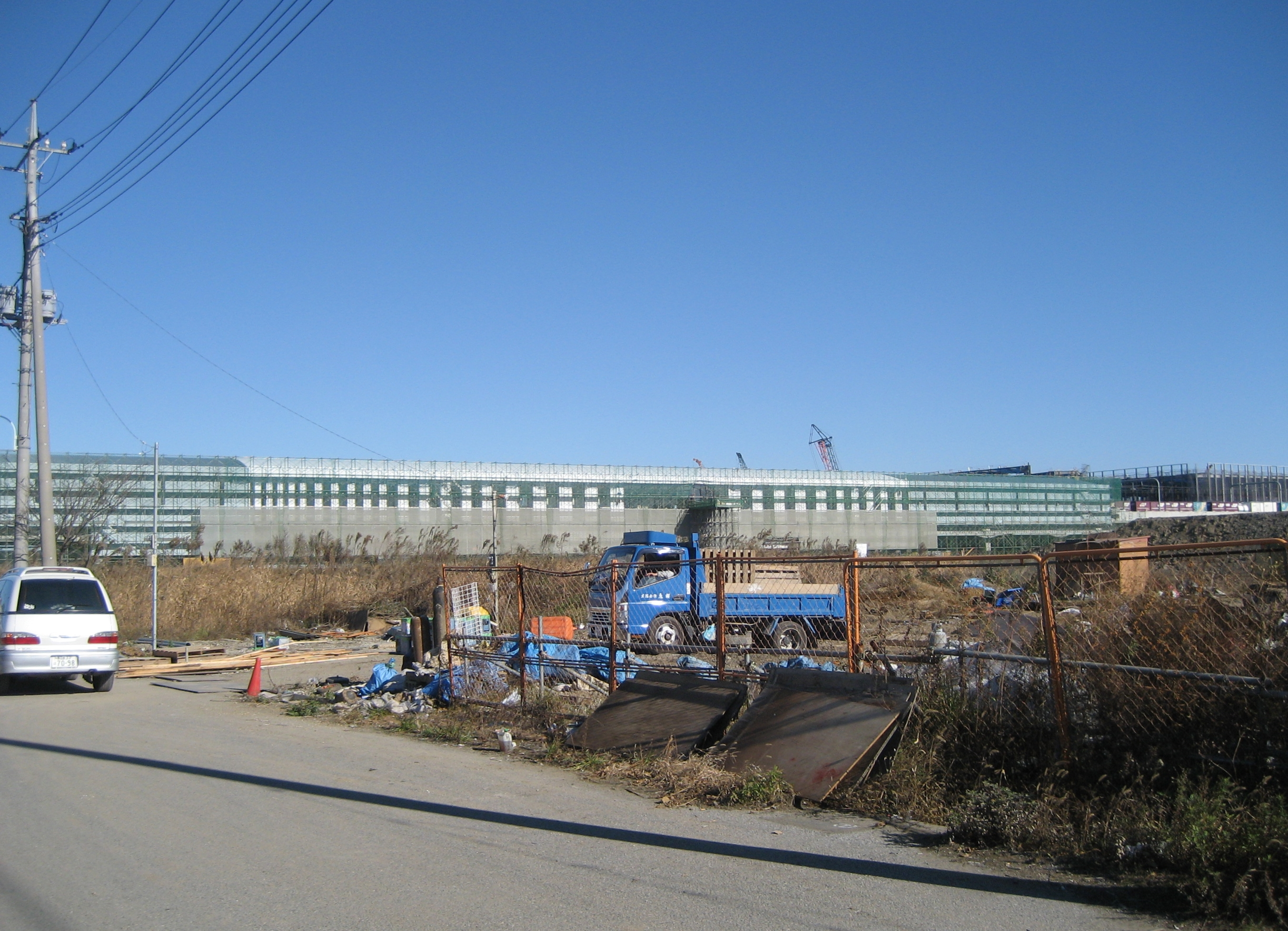
The south side of the station while under construction in December 2007

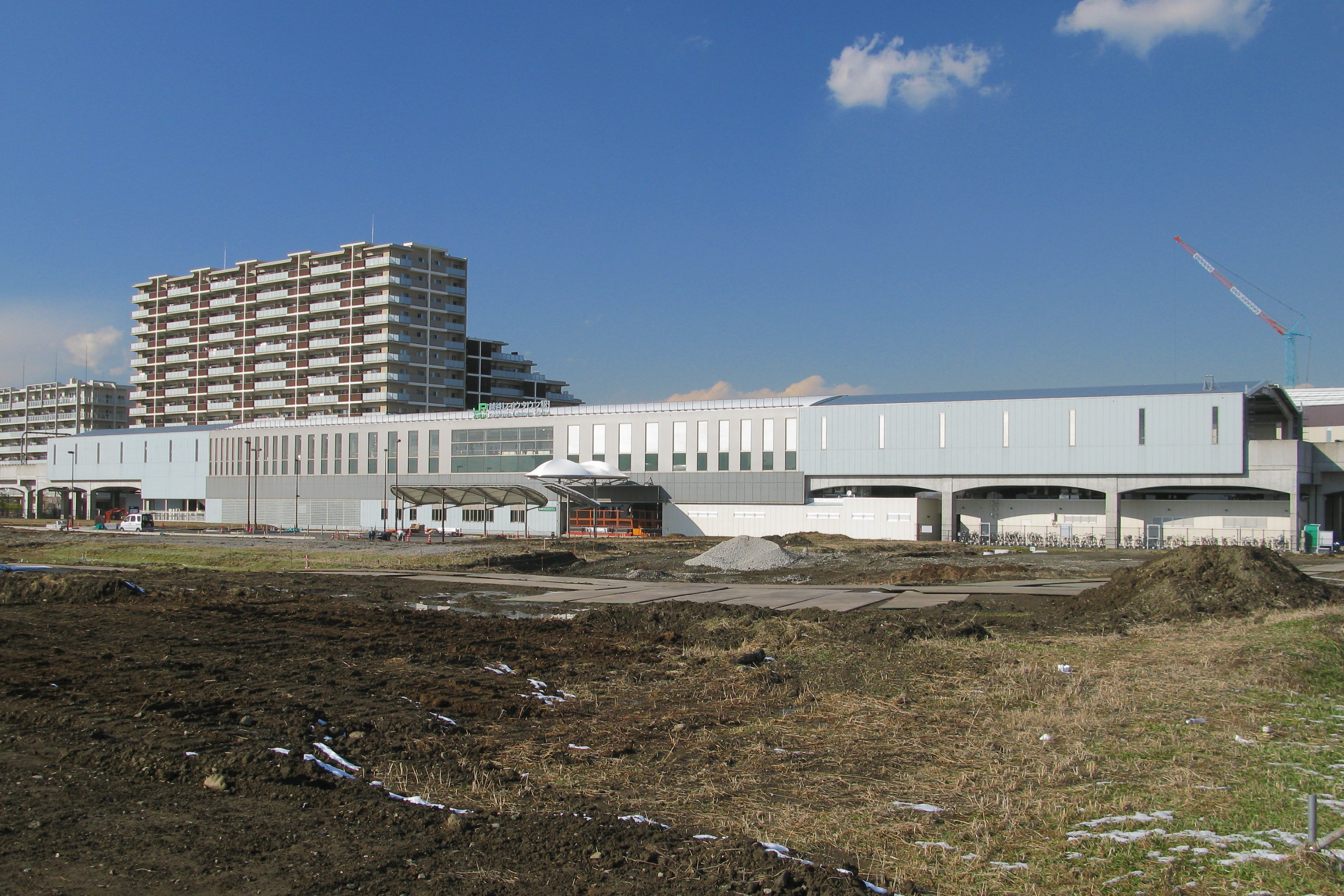
The south side of the station in January 2012 before completion of the south-side forecourt

== Passenger statistics ==
In fiscal 2019, the station was used by an average of 28,675 passengers daily (boarding passengers only).

== Surrounding area ==
- Aeon Laketown shopping mall

=== Schools ===
- Koshigaya-Minami Senior High School
- Eimei Senior High School
- Minami Junior High School
- Koyo Junior High School
- Kawayanagi Elementary School
- Meisei Elementary School
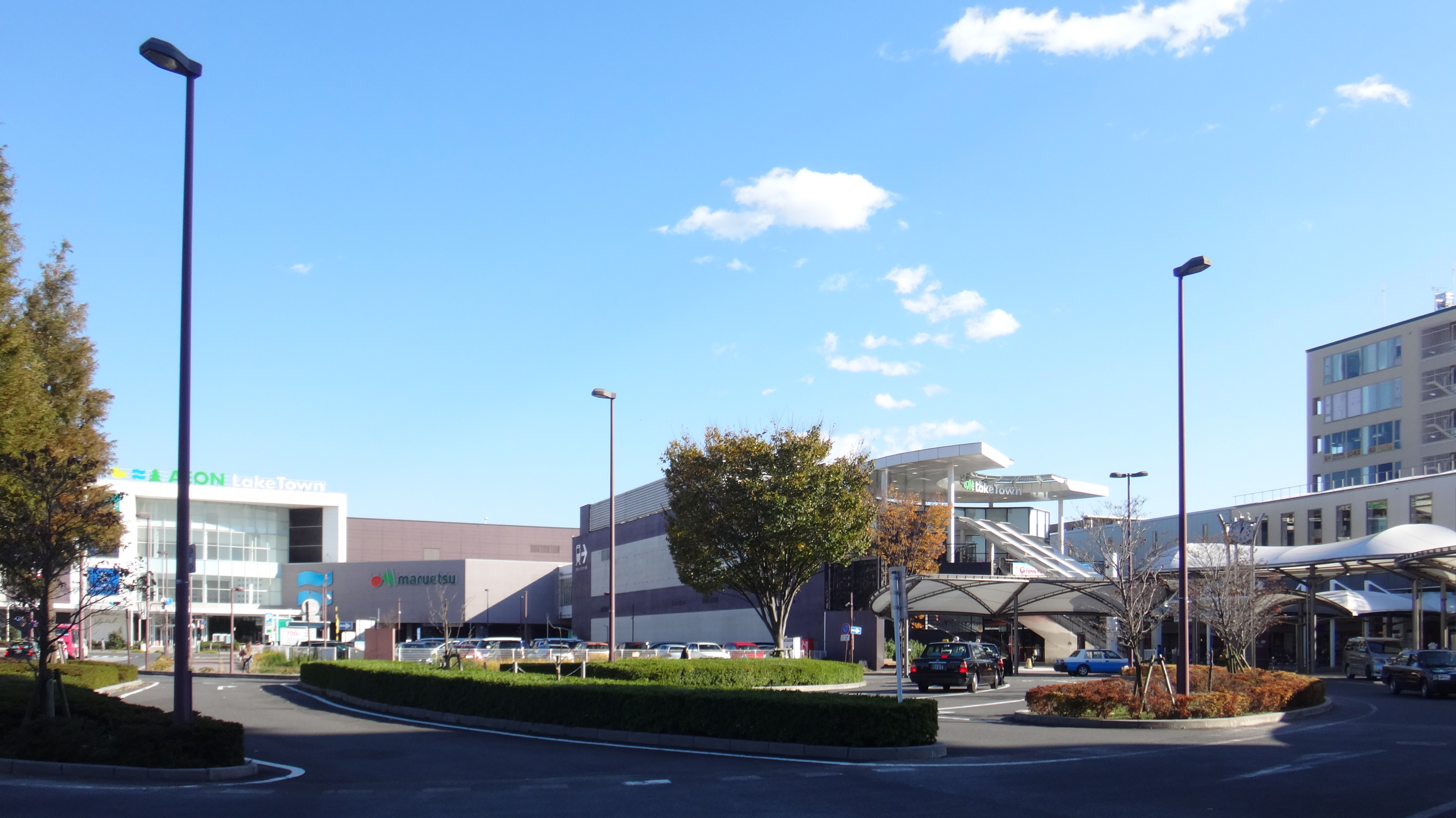
The station forecourt on the north side, December 2015

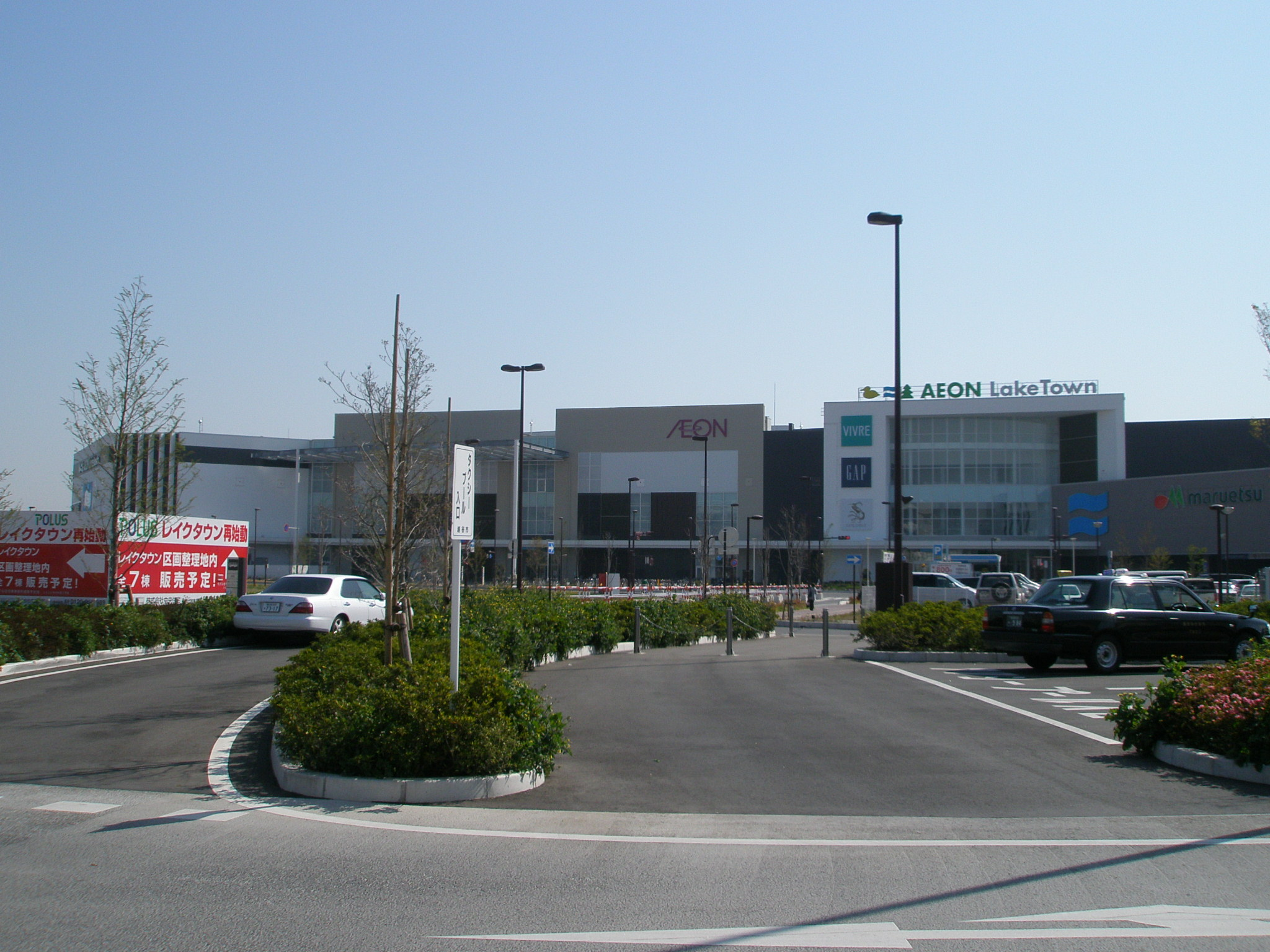
Aeon Laketown shopping mall adjacent to the station, April 2009

== See also ==
- List of railway stations in Japan
