= Saitama Toho Junior College =

Higher education institution in Saitama Prefecture, Japan

Coordinates: 35°52′11.5″N 139°46′48.9″E

- 埼玉東萌短期大学
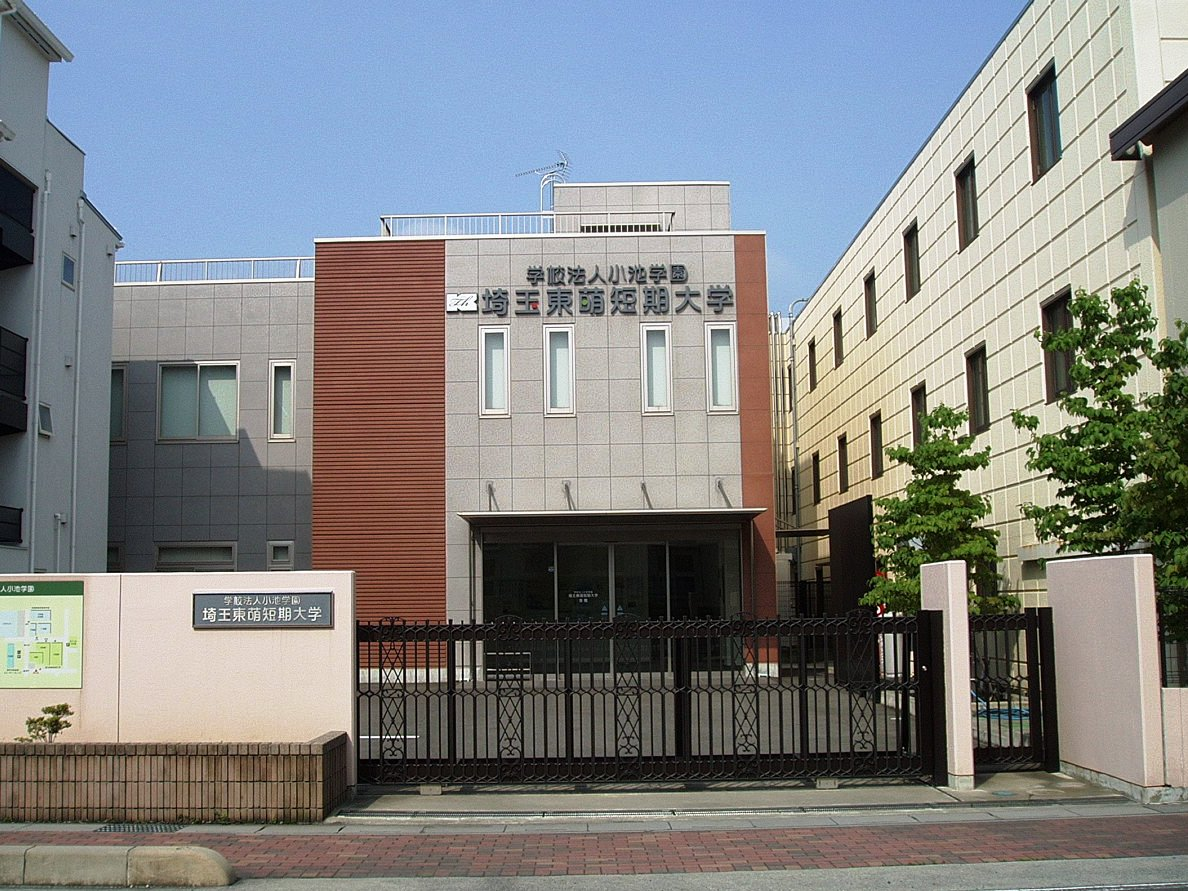
- main entrance
- Type: Private
- Established: 2011
- Location: Koshigaya, Saitama, Japan
- Website: www.saitamatoho.jp

Saitama Toho Junior College (埼玉東萌短期大学, Saitama Tōhō Tanki Daigaku) is a private junior college in Koshigaya, Saitama, Japan, established in April 2011. The predecessor of the school was founded in April 1973.
