= Koshigaya =

Koshigaya 越谷市
- Core city
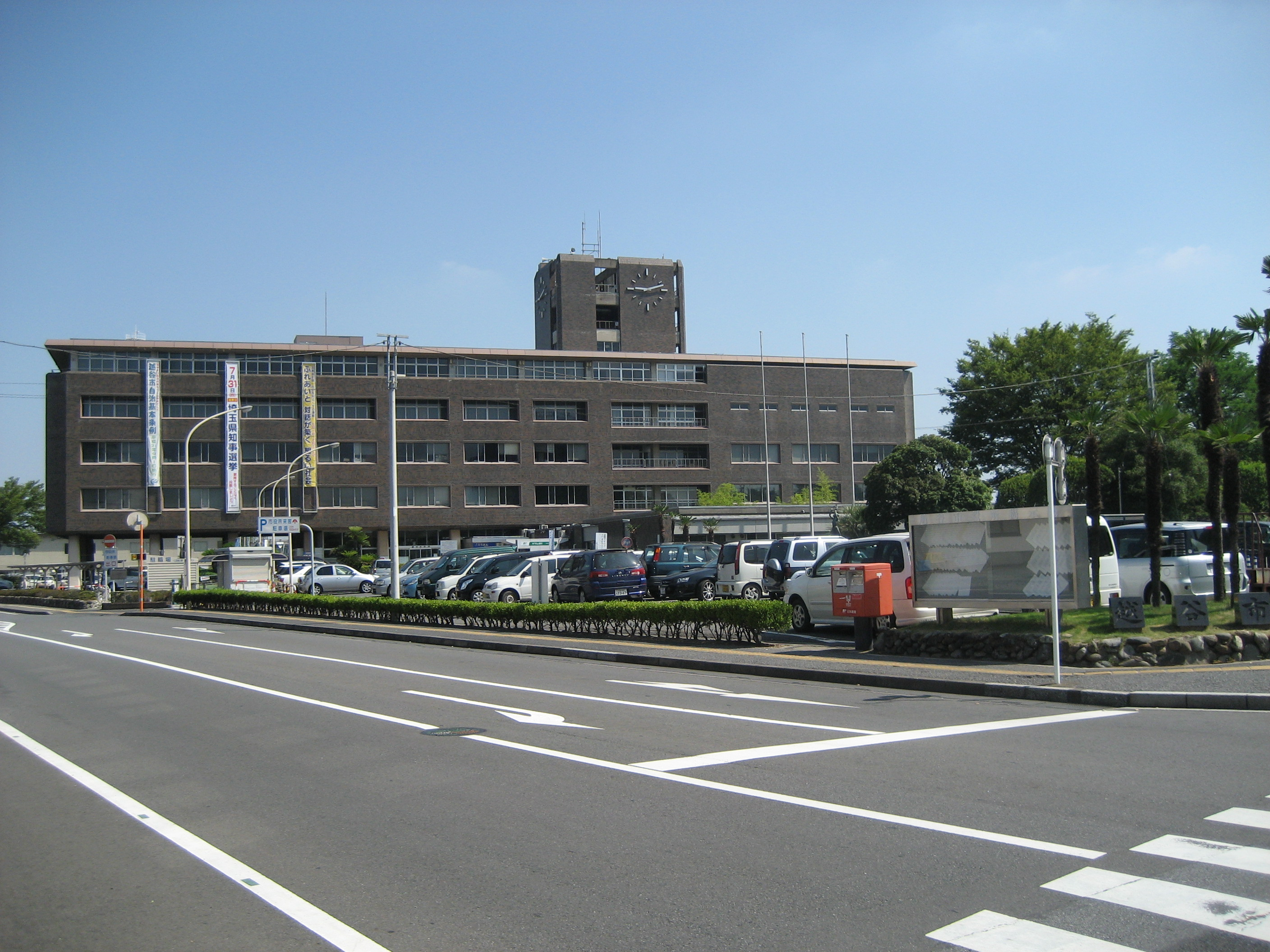
- Koshigaya City Hall

- Flag Seal

- Location of Koshigaya in Saitama Prefecture

- Location within Japan
- Coordinates: 35°53′28.1″N 139°47′27.3″E
- Country: Japan
- Region: Kantō
- Prefecture: Saitama

Government
  - Mayor: Tsutomu Takahashi

Area
  - Total: 60.24 km^{2} (23.26 sq mi)

Population (February 2021)
  - Total: 345,353
  - Density: 5,733/km^{2} (14,850/sq mi)
- Time zone: UTC+9 (Japan Standard Time)
- Phone number: 048-982-5111
- Address: 4-2-1 Koshigaya, Koshigaya-shi, Saitama-ken 343-8501
- Climate: Cfa
- Website: Official website
- Symbols
- Bird: Eurasian collared dove
- Flower: Chrysanthemum
- Tree: Zelkova serrata

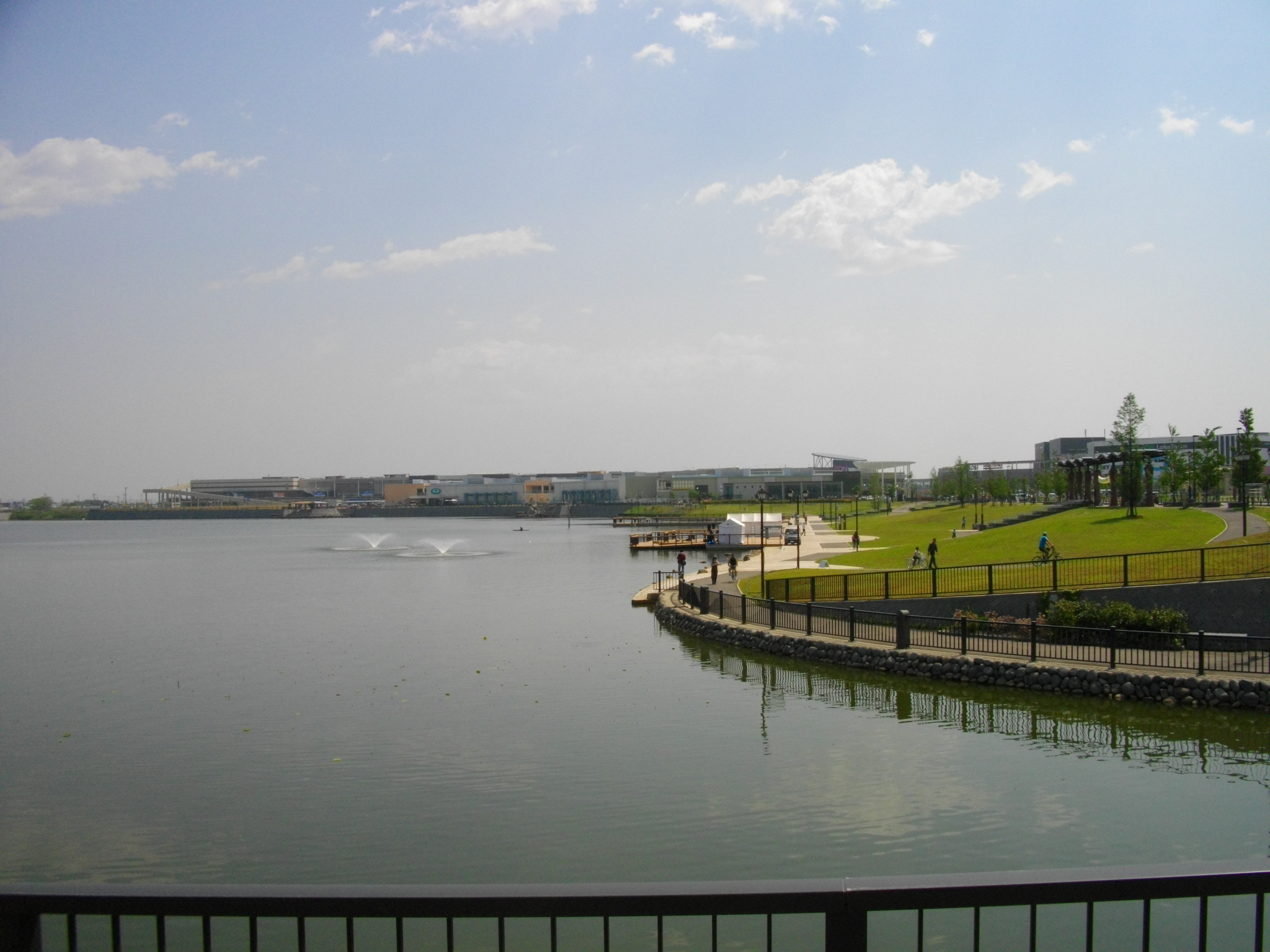
View of Aeon LakeTown shopping mall

Koshigaya (越谷市, Koshigaya-shi) is a city located in Saitama Prefecture, Japan. As of 1 January 2021, the city had an estimated population of 345,353 in 158,022 households and a population density of 5700 persons per km^{2}. The total area of the city is 60.24 square kilometres (23.26 sq mi). It is famous for producing daruma dolls.

== Geography ==
Koshigaya is situated in eastern Saitama Prefecture, in the alluvial plain of the Nakagawa basin between the Omiya plateau and the Shimosa plateau. Most of the city area is flat with an average elevation of only five meters above sea level. Many rivers, including the Motoara River, Naka River, Ayase River, Furutone River, and Sakagawa River flow through the city. Koshigaya, which is about 25 kilometers north of Tokyo and developed as a transportation for water and land transportation from premodern times.

=== Surrounding municipalities ===
- Saitama Prefecture
  - Kasukabe
  - Kawaguchi
  - Matsubushi
  - Saitama (Iwatsuki-ku)
  - Sōka
  - Yoshikawa

=== Climate ===
Koshigaya has a humid subtropical climate (Köppen Cfa) characterized by warm summers and cool winters with light to no snowfall. The average annual temperature in Koshigaya is 14.7 °C. The average annual rainfall is 1408 mm with September as the wettest month. The temperatures are highest on average in August, at around 26.4 °C, and lowest in January, at around 3.1 °C.

Climate data for Koshigaya (1991−2020 normals, extremes 1977−present)
Month	Jan	Feb	Mar	Apr	May	Jun	Jul	Aug	Sep	Oct	Nov	Dec	Year
Record high °C (°F)	18.9 (66.0)	24.3 (75.7)	27.7 (81.9)	30.3 (86.5)	35.1 (95.2)	35.8 (96.4)	40.2 (104.4)	40.4 (104.7)	37.9 (100.2)	33.6 (92.5)	26.1 (79.0)	25.9 (78.6)	40.4 (104.7)
Mean daily maximum °C (°F)	9.6 (49.3)	10.6 (51.1)	14.1 (57.4)	19.6 (67.3)	24.1 (75.4)	26.7 (80.1)	30.7 (87.3)	32.1 (89.8)	27.9 (82.2)	22.1 (71.8)	16.6 (61.9)	11.8 (53.2)	20.5 (68.9)
Daily mean °C (°F)	4.2 (39.6)	5.2 (41.4)	8.7 (47.7)	13.9 (57.0)	18.7 (65.7)	22.0 (71.6)	25.9 (78.6)	27.1 (80.8)	23.3 (73.9)	17.5 (63.5)	11.6 (52.9)	6.5 (43.7)	15.4 (59.7)
Mean daily minimum °C (°F)	−0.5 (31.1)	0.4 (32.7)	3.6 (38.5)	8.7 (47.7)	14.0 (57.2)	18.2 (64.8)	22.2 (72.0)	23.4 (74.1)	19.7 (67.5)	13.7 (56.7)	7.3 (45.1)	1.8 (35.2)	11.0 (51.8)
Record low °C (°F)	−7.5 (18.5)	−7.1 (19.2)	−4.9 (23.2)	−1.4 (29.5)	4.7 (40.5)	10.6 (51.1)	14.1 (57.4)	15.4 (59.7)	10.2 (50.4)	4.2 (39.6)	−1.8 (28.8)	−5.3 (22.5)	−7.5 (18.5)
Average precipitation mm (inches)	50.2 (1.98)	47.5 (1.87)	94.5 (3.72)	109.8 (4.32)	124.4 (4.90)	144.0 (5.67)	138.0 (5.43)	134.3 (5.29)	197.0 (7.76)	203.4 (8.01)	78.6 (3.09)	50.3 (1.98)	1,366.9 (53.81)
Average precipitation days (≥ 1.0 mm)	4.4	5.0	9.2	9.9	10.2	12.0	11.0	8.6	11.0	10.1	7.3	5.2	103.4
Mean monthly sunshine hours	199.6	181.7	185.3	184.0	182.5	128.9	153.4	180.1	134.7	135.5	153.7	174.5	1,993.9
Source: Japan Meteorological Agency

== Demographics ==
Per Japanese census data, the population of Koshigaya has increased rapidly from the 1960s.

Historical population
Year	Pop.	±%
1960	49,585	—
1970	139,368	+181.1%
1980	223,241	+60.2%
1990	285,259	+27.8%
2000	308,307	+8.1%
2010	326,313	+5.8%
2020	341,621	+4.7%

== History ==
The area around Koshigaya was an inlet of the sea in the Jōmon period and was settle during the Yayoi or early Kofun period. In the Nara period, it was a border area straddling Musashi and Shimōsa Provinces. Koshigaya-shuku prospered during the Edo period as a post station on the Nikkō Kaidō and the Ōshū Kaidō highways, and the town served as the temporary residence of the Tokugawa shōgun after the 1657 Great Fire of Meireki which destroyed Edo Castle. The town also had a riverine connection with Edo and served as a transportation and transshipment center.

=== Municipal timeline ===
- The town of Koshigaya (then spelled 越ヶ谷) was created within Minamisaitama District, Saitama with the establishment of the modern municipalities system on April 1, 1889.
- It annexed the neighboring villages of Ozawa, Niikata, Sakurai, Obukuro, Ogishima, Dewa, Gamo, Osagami, and Masubayashi on November 3, 1954 and changed the spelling of its name to its present form.
- Koshigaya annexed the neighboring village of Soka on November 3, 1955.
- Koshigaya was elevated to city status on November 3, 1958.

Koshigaya was elevated further to special city status on April 1, 2003 and to core city status on April 1, 2015.

== Government ==
Koshigaya has a mayor-council form of government with a directly elected mayor and a unicameral city council of 32 members. Koshigaya contributes four members to the Saitama Prefectural Assembly. In terms of national politics, the city is part of Saitama 3rd district of the lower house of the Diet of Japan.

== Economy ==
Koshigaya is a major regional commercial center with a diversified industrial base.

== Education ==
- Bunkyo University
- Saitama Prefectural University
- Saitama Toho Junior College
- Koshigaya has 30 public elementary schools and 15 public middle schools operated by the city government, and six public high schools operated by the Saitama Prefectural Board of Education. In addition, there are one private middle school and two private high schools. The prefecture also operates two special education schools for the handicapped.

== Transportation ==
=== Railway ===
JR East – Musashino Line

- Minami-Koshigaya - Koshigaya-Laketown

Tōbu Railway - Tōbu Skytree Line

- Gamō - Shin-Koshigaya - Koshigaya - Kita-Koshigaya - Ōbukuro - Sengendai

=== Highway ===
- National Route 4
- National Route 463

== Sister cities ==
- Campbelltown, New South Wales, Australia, since April 11, 1984

== Local attractions ==
- Aeon Laketown shopping mall
- Aritaki Arboretum

== In fiction ==
The actual scenery of Koshigaya is set in the anime and manga series, Miss Kobayashi's Dragon Maid. albeit with the name of "Oborozuka".

== Notable people ==
- Yasue Funayama, politician
- Sumio Iijima, scientist
- Abi Masatora, sumo wrestler
- Tsubasa Masuwaka, fashion model
- Junri Namigata, professional tennis player
- Boniface Nduka, football player
- Yuka Ogino, tarento
- Atsushi Satō, one of the lead vocalists of EXILE
- Ryuto Yasuoka, basketball player
