= Ōbukuro Station =

Railway station in Koshigaya, Saitama Prefecture, Japan

TS23 Ōbukuro Station 大袋駅
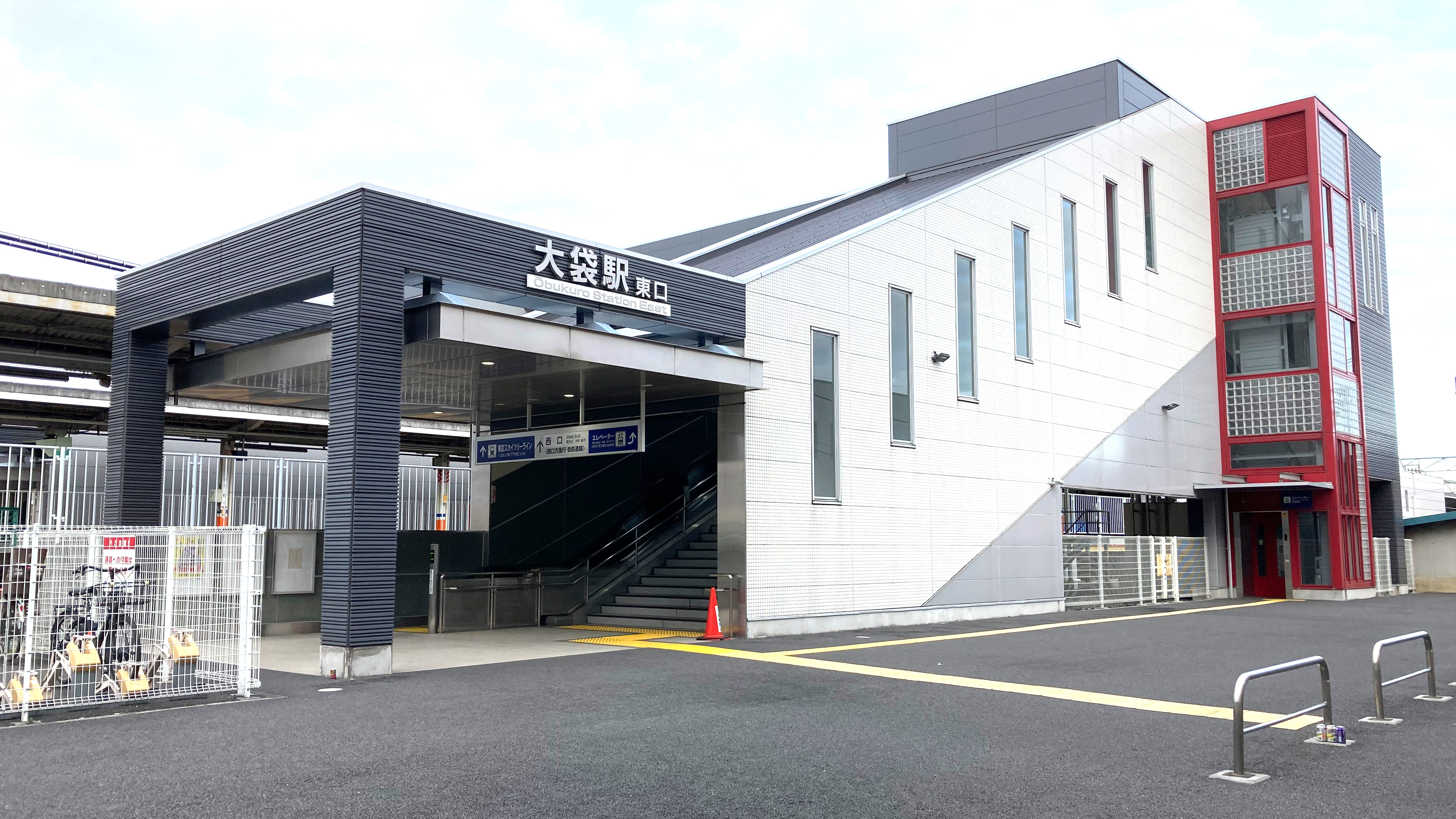
- The east entrance to the station in January 2022

General information
- Location: 1200 Ōbukuro, Koshigaya City, Saitama Prefecture 343-0032; Japan
- Coordinates: 35.9244°N 139.7780°E
- Operator: Tōbu Railway
- Line: Tōbu Skytree Line
- Distance: 28.5 km (17.7 mi) from Asakusa Station
- Platforms: 2 side platforms
- Tracks: 2

Other information
- Station code: TS-23
- Website: Official website

History
- Opened: 1 October 1926; 99 years ago

Passengers
- FY2024: 9,028 daily boardings

Services
Preceding station	Tobu Railway	Following station
Kita-Koshigaya TS22 towards Oshiage	Tobu Skytree Line Semi Express	Sengendai TS24 towards Tōbu-Dōbutsu-Kōen
Kita-Koshigaya TS22 towards Asakusa	Tobu Skytree Line Section Semi Express Local	Sengendai TS24 towards Tōbu-Dōbutsu-Kōen
Location
- Location within Saitama Prefecture Location within Kanto Area Location within Japan

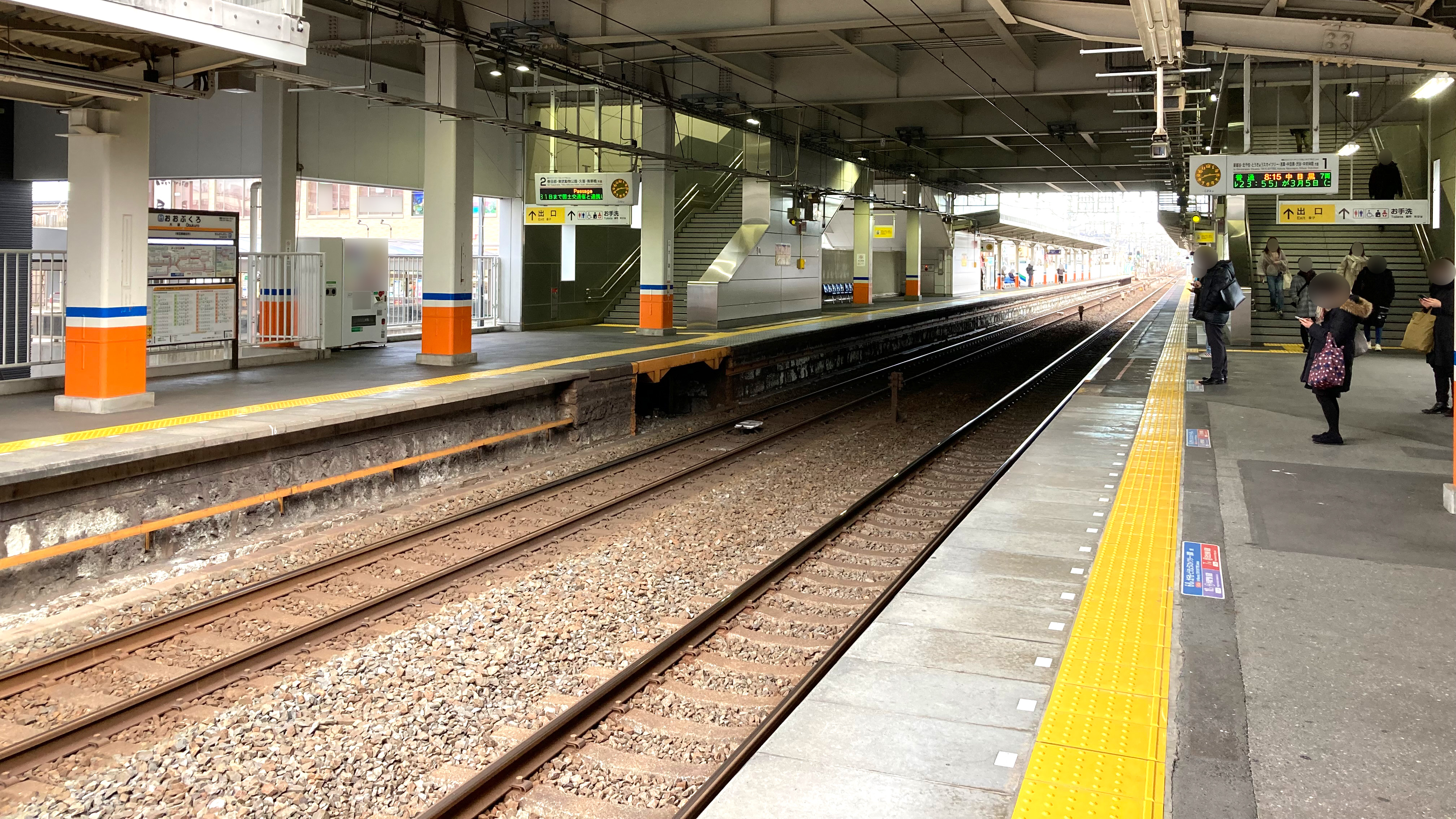
The platforms in January 2022

Ōbukuro Station (大袋駅, Ōbukuro-eki) is a passenger railway station located in the city of Koshigaya, Saitama, Japan, operated by the private railway operator Tōbu Railway.

== Line ==
The station is served by the Tōbu Skytree Line (Tōbu Isesaki Line), and is 28.5 kilometers from the terminus of the line at Asakusa Station.

== Station layout ==
The station has two opposed side platforms with two tracks, with an elevated station building above the tracks and platforms at a right angle.

=== Platforms ===
1	Tōbu Skytree Line	for Kita-Senju, Hikifune, and Asakusa; Tokyo Metro Hanzomon Line for Shibuya; Tokyu Den-en-toshi Line for Chūō-rinkan; Tokyo Metro Hibiya Line for Ueno and Naka-meguro
2	Tōbu Skytree Line	for Kasukabe and Tōbu-Dōbutsu-Kōen; Tobu Isesaki Line for Kuki; Tōbu Nikkō Line for Minami-Kurihashi

== History ==
Ōbukuro Station opened on 1 October 1926. From 17 March 2012, station numbering was introduced on all Tōbu lines, with Ōbukuro Station becoming "TS-23".

== Passenger statistics ==
In fiscal 2024, the station was used by an average of 9,028 passengers daily (boarding passengers only).

== Surrounding area ==
- Koshigaya Ōbukuro Post Office
- National Route 4

== See also ==
- List of railway stations in Japan
