= Grape Creek, Texas =

- Census-designated place
- Coordinates: 31°34′54″N 100°32′51″W
- Country: United States
- State: Texas
- County: Tom Green

Area
  - Total: 15.7 sq mi (40.7 km^{2})
  - Land: 15.7 sq mi (40.7 km^{2})
  - Water: 0 sq mi (0.0 km^{2})
- Elevation: 1,988 ft (606 m)

Population (2020)
  - Total: 3,594
  - Density: 229/sq mi (88.3/km^{2})
- Time zone: UTC-6 (Central (CST))
  - Summer (DST): UTC-5 (CDT)
- Zip Code: 76901
- FIPS code: 48-30629
- GNIS feature ID: 1852708

Grape Creek is a census-designated place (CDP) in Tom Green County, Texas, United States. It is part of the San Angelo, Texas Metropolitan Statistical Area. As of the 2020 census, Grape Creek had a population of 3,594.

== Geography ==
Grape Creek is located at 31°34′54″N 100°32′51″W (31.581679, -100.547371). According to the United States Census Bureau in 2000, the CDP has a total area of 17.2 square miles (44.6 km^{2}), all land. Prior to the 2010 census, the CDP lost area, reducing it to a total area of 15.7 square miles (41 km^{2}), all land as before.

== History ==
Grape Creek CDP is on Grape Creek just north of U.S. Highway 87 and the Gulf, Colorado and Santa Fe Railway in north central Tom Green County. The area was populated as early as 1858, when the Butterfield Overland Mail established a Grape Creek station on the east bank of the east fork of Grape Creek near the present-day community. The community was founded before 1900. In 1901, the community had a school for 26 pupils and one teacher, and by 1934, it had three elementary schools and a high school. State highway maps in 1936 showed the school, a church, a nearby cemetery, and scattered dwellings in the community. By the 1980s, the Grape Creek-Pulliam School was in operation, and the area had become the site of a new subdivision known as Grape Creek Community.

== Demographics ==
Historical population
Census	Pop.	Note	%±
2000	3,138		—
2010	3,154		0.5%
2020	3,594		14.0%
U.S. Decennial Census; 1850–1900 1910; 1920 1930 1940; 1950 1960 1970; 1980 1990 2000; 2010

Grape Creek first appeared as a census-designated place in the 2000 U.S. census.

=== Racial and ethnic composition ===
Grape Creek CDP, Texas – Racial and ethnic composition Note: the US Census treats Hispanic/Latino as an ethnic category. This table excludes Latinos from the racial categories and assigns them to a separate category. Hispanics/Latinos may be of any race.
Race / Ethnicity (NH = Non-Hispanic)	Pop 2000	Pop 2010	Pop 2020	% 2000	% 2010	% 2020
White alone (NH)	2,569	2,368	2,399	81.87%	75.08%	66.75%
Black or African American alone (NH)	12	9	28	0.38%	0.29%	0.78%
Native American or Alaska Native alone (NH)	20	9	25	0.64%	0.29%	0.70%
Asian alone (NH)	3	14	7	0.10%	0.44%	0.19%
Native Hawaiian or Pacific Islander alone (NH)	1	1	1	0.03%	0.03%	0.03%
Other race alone (NH)	0	3	13	0.00%	0.10%	0.36%
Mixed race or Multiracial (NH)	38	44	157	1.21%	1.40%	4.37%
Hispanic or Latino (any race)	495	706	964	15.77%	22.38%	26.82%
Total	3,138	3,154	3,594	100.00%	100.00%	100.00%

=== 2020 census ===
As of the 2020 census, Grape Creek had a population of 3,594. The median age was 39.8 years. 23.9% of residents were under the age of 18 and 17.9% of residents were 65 years of age or older. For every 100 females there were 107.0 males, and for every 100 females age 18 and over there were 104.0 males age 18 and over.

0.0% of residents lived in urban areas, while 100.0% lived in rural areas.

There were 1,332 households in Grape Creek, of which 31.4% had children under the age of 18 living in them. Of all households, 49.9% were married-couple households, 23.1% were households with a male householder and no spouse or partner present, and 20.5% were households with a female householder and no spouse or partner present. About 22.9% of all households were made up of individuals and 9.7% had someone living alone who was 65 years of age or older.

There were 1,481 housing units, of which 10.1% were vacant. The homeowner vacancy rate was 1.1% and the rental vacancy rate was 11.6%.

=== 2000 census ===
As of the census of 2000, 3,138 people, 1,124 households, and 892 families resided in the CDP. The population density was 182.3 inhabitants per square mile (70.4/km^{2}). There were 1,219 housing units at an average density of 70.8 per square mile (27.3/km^{2}). The racial makeup of the CDP was 91.78% White, 0.41% African American, 0.76% Native American, 0.10% Asian, 0.03% Pacific Islander, 4.84% from other races, and 2.07% from two or more races. Hispanics or Latinos of any race were 15.77% of the population.

Of the 1,124 households, 38.9% had children under the age of 18 living with them, 64.4% were married couples living together, 11.1% had a female householder with no husband present, and 20.6% were not families. About 17.2% of all households were made up of individuals, and 6.0% had someone living alone who was 65 years of age or older. The average household size was 2.79 and the average family size was 3.14.

In the CDP, the population was distributed as 28.8% under the age of 18, 8.1% from 18 to 24, 27.3% from 25 to 44, 25.2% from 45 to 64, and 10.5% who were 65 years of age or older. The median age was 36 years. For every 100 females, there were 97.2 males. For every 100 females age 18 and over, there were 95.2 males.

The median income for a household in the CDP was $35,046, and for a family was $38,413. Males had a median income of $30,931 versus $19,957 for females. The per capita income for the CDP was $14,806. About 15.0% of families and 15.5% of the population were below the poverty line, including 19.6% of those under age 18 and 15.1% of those age 65 or over.

== Education ==
Public education in the community of Grape Creek is provided by the Grape Creek Independent School District, and home to the Grape Creek High School Eagles.

== Footnotes ==
1 Texas Almanac 2008-2009 Butterfield Overland Mail in Texas entry 2 Handbook of Texas Online Grape Creek entry
