= Grape Creek Independent School District =

School district in Texas

Coordinates: 31.5592°N 100.5469°W

Grape Creek Independent School District is a public school district in north-central Tom Green County, Texas, that serves the community of Grape Creek and surrounding areas. Grape Creek ISD has three campuses - Grape Creek High (grades 9-12), Grape Creek Middle (grades 6-8), and Grape Creek Elementary (grades PK-5).

In 2009, the school district was rated "academically acceptable" by the Texas Education Agency.
