= Aritaki Arboretum =

Private arboretum in Koshigaya, Saitama, Japan

Coordinates: 35°54′00″N 139°47′23″E

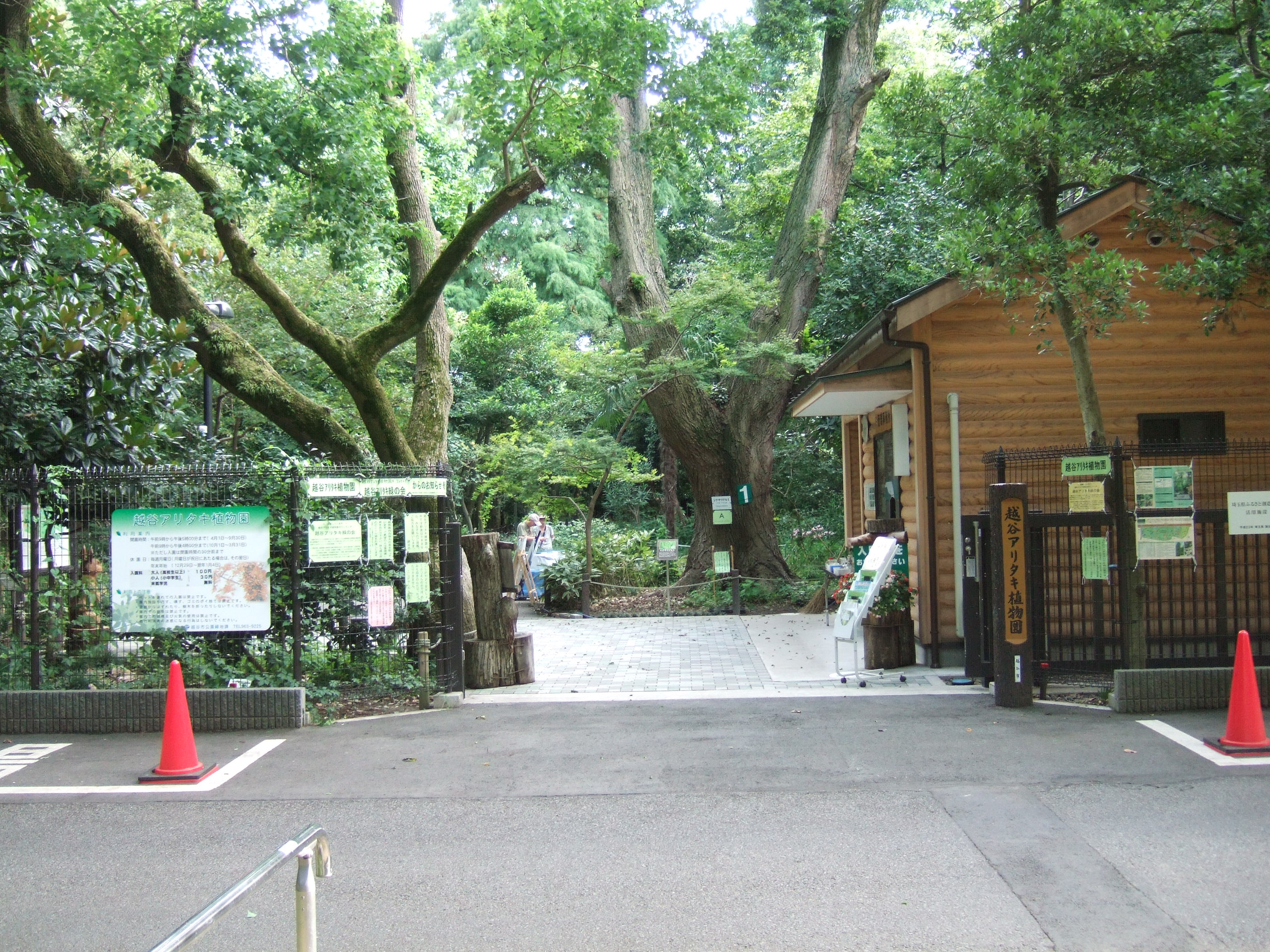
Entrance to Araki Arboretum

The Aritaki Arboretum (アリタキアーボレータム, Aritaki Āborētamu) is a private arboretum located at 2566 Koshigaya, Koshigaya, Saitama, Japan. Its curator, Tadahiko Aritaki, traveled and collected plants throughout Asia.
