= University of Shiga Prefecture =

University in Hikone, Shiga, Japan

Coordinates: 35°15′35.5″N 136°13′9.4″E

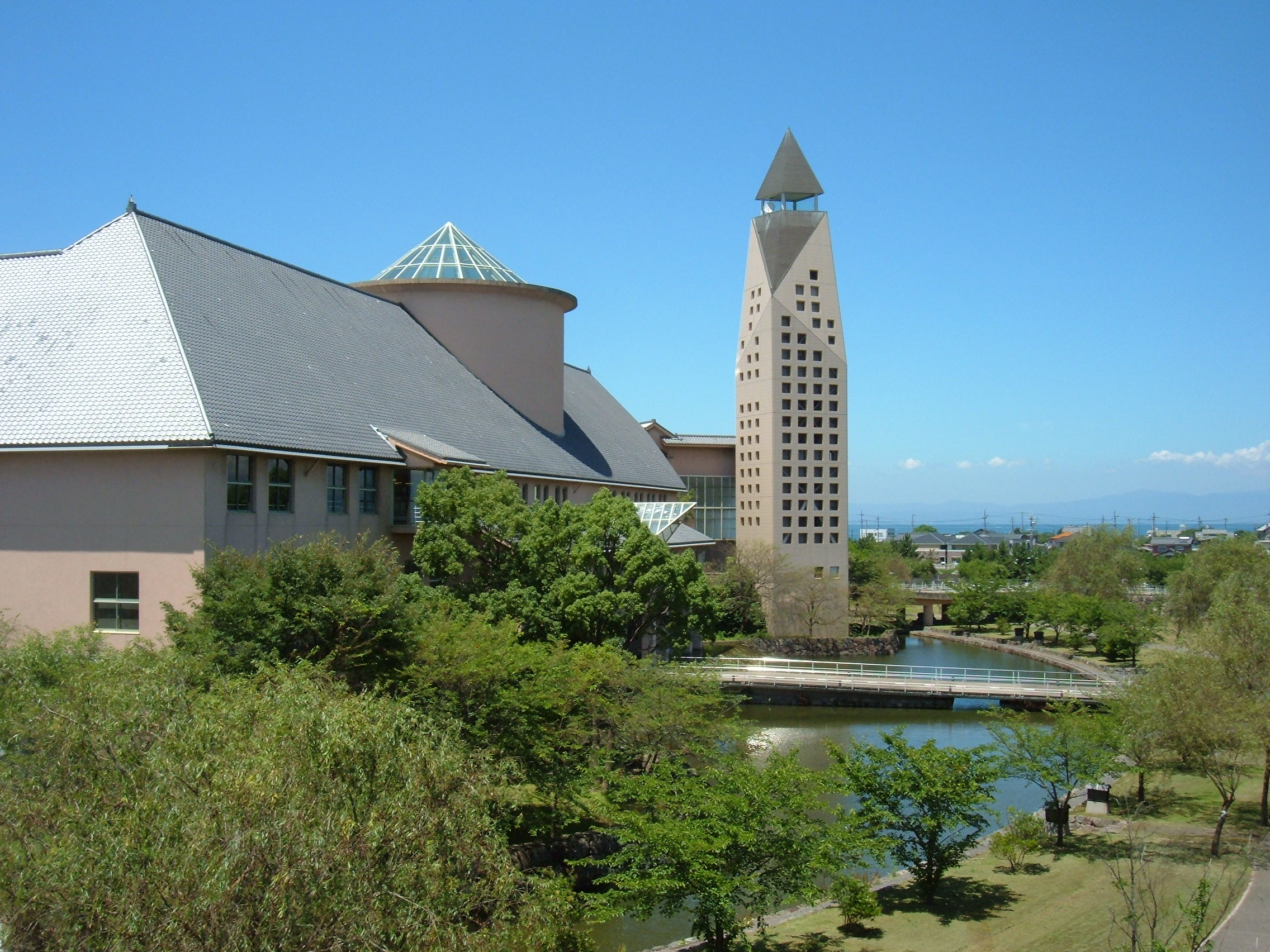
- Motto: キャンパスは琵琶湖。テキストは人間。(Lake Biwa is our campus. Humanity is our text.)
- Type: Public
- Established: 1950 as Shiga Prefecture College. Reorganized in 1995 as The University of Shiga Prefecture
- President: Hirokawa Yoshitugu
- Academic staff: 264
- Students: 2557
- Undergraduates: 238
- Postgraduates: 30
- Location: Hikone
- Campus: Region 320184 m^{2}
- Colours: Biwako-blue
- Nickname: Kendai
- Website: https://www.usp.ac.jp/english/

The University of Shiga Prefecture (滋賀県立大学, Shiga Kenritsu Daigaku) is a public university in Hikone, Shiga, Japan. The predecessor of the school was founded in 1950, and it was chartered as a university in 1995.

The nickname of the university is "Kendai". The first university president was Hidaka Toshitaka (Japanese: 日高敏隆) who was an ethologist. Before 1995, this university was a junior college: Shiga Prefecture College (Japanese: 滋賀県立短期大学). In 2003, Shiga Prefecture College was reorganized as The University of Shiga Prefecture.

== History ==
・Nov 27, 1991: The university set up an establishment preparatory committee and hold the first meeting.

・Sep 16, 1993: The university holds a groundbreaking ceremony of the school building maintenance business.

・Apr 28,1994: The university apply for the setting authorization.

・Dec 21, 1994: The setting is authorized.

・April 10, 1995: The University of Shiga Prefecture opens studies and has its first entering ceremony. It set up department of environmental science, engineering, human culture.

・Jun 6, 1994: First opening ceremony.

・April 1996: The university opens 20,000 collection of books received from the Chinese museum of Kobe in April.

・Sep 7, 1996: Exchange center is opened.

・1998: A school building is chosen to 100 selections of public buildings.

・Mar 24, 1999: The first graduation ceremony and the establishment of an alumni association establishment meeting.

・Mar 13, 2002: Signed a unit compatible agreement with Shiga University.

・Apr 28, 2002: Application for permission to establish human nursing facility.

・Dec 19, 2002: Approved to establish faculty of human nursing.

・Apr, 2003: Established the Faculty of human nursing.

・March 24, 2005: The last graduation ceremony of the short term department of nursing college is held.

・Apr, 2006: The university will be the university that will establish and operate "public university corporation University of Shiga University".

・Apr, 2008: Department of Engineering Department is established.

・Sep 7, 2008: The university opened the center for Environment Symbiotic Research.

・Nov 9, 2009: The university conclude an exchange agreement with Augsburg University.

・2009: The university was completed the Electronic System Engineering Building.

・2012: Department of International Communication has been established in the Faculty of Human Culture.

== Campus ==
The campus is located near Lake Biwa. In 1998, this university was selected as one of the hundred best public buildings.

== Departments and courses ==
- School of Environmental Science

・Department of Ecosystem Studies

・Department of Environmental Policy and Planning

・Department of Design and Architecture

・Department of Biological Resources Management

- School of Engineering

・Department of Materials Science

・Department of Mechanical Systems

・Department of Electronic Systems

- School of Human Culture

・Department of Regional Culture

- Department of Life Design

・Department of Nutrition

・Department of Human Relations

・Department of International Communication

- School of Nursing

・Department of Human Nursing

== Graduate school ==
=== Environmental Science Graduate Course ===
- Department of Environmental Dynamics
- Department of Environmental Planning Science

=== Engineering Graduate Course ===
- Department of Material Chemistry
- Department of Machine System Engineering

=== Human Cultural Studies Graduate Course ===
- Department of Local Cultural Studies
- Department of Life and Cultural Studies

=== Human Nursing Science Graduate Course ===
- Department of Human Nursing Science

== Agreement between other universities ==
・Mongolia

・National University of Mongolia

・The United States of America

・Michigan State University

・Lake Superior State University

・People's Republic of China

・Hunan Normal University

・Hunan Agricultural University

・Republic of Korea

・Pai Chai University

・Kookmin University

== School festival ==
=== School festival ===
The school festival is held for 3 days on Friday, Saturday, and Sunday in the second week of November. This festival is called "Kofu-festival".

・ Features: As universities have the Department of Environmental Science, school festivals are actively engaged in considering the environment. The festival has sorting of garbage by a garbage can character called "Gomilla", "my own chopsticks" project, DRP (Dish Return Project) which is adopting a plastic dish which can be used any number of times, not a disposable dish. This is to work on resource conservation measures.

=== Summer festival ===
It is held on Saturday around late May. It is called the summer festival, or "Umi Kaze Natsu Matsuri".

・This event gives a privilege to people who put on the kimono by distributing a fan. This festival's concept is "connection with the local community" so organizations which play an active part in the local area engage in this festival and participants dance "Goshu Ondo" which is a traditional dance in this prefecture.

== Events ==
・The orchestra in USP is held a concert annual autumn in Hikone Cultural Plaza.

== Clubs ==
・University of Shiga Prefecture Sports Clubs

・Men's volleyball club

・Women's volleyball club

・Men's basketball club

・Men's tennis club

・Women's tennis club

・Badminton club

・Track and field club

・Kendo club

・Kyudo club

・Judo club

・Aikido club

・Hardball baseball club

・Rubberball baseball

・Windsurfing club

・Canoe club

・Rowing club (Suspension of club activities)

・Swimming club

・Golf club

・Table tennis club

・Soccer club

・Futsal club

・Gymnastics and trampoline club
