= Yamagata Prefectural Yonezawa University of Nutrition Sciences =

University in Yonezawa, Japan

Coordinates: 37°53′27″N 140°07′24″E

- 山形県立米沢栄養大学
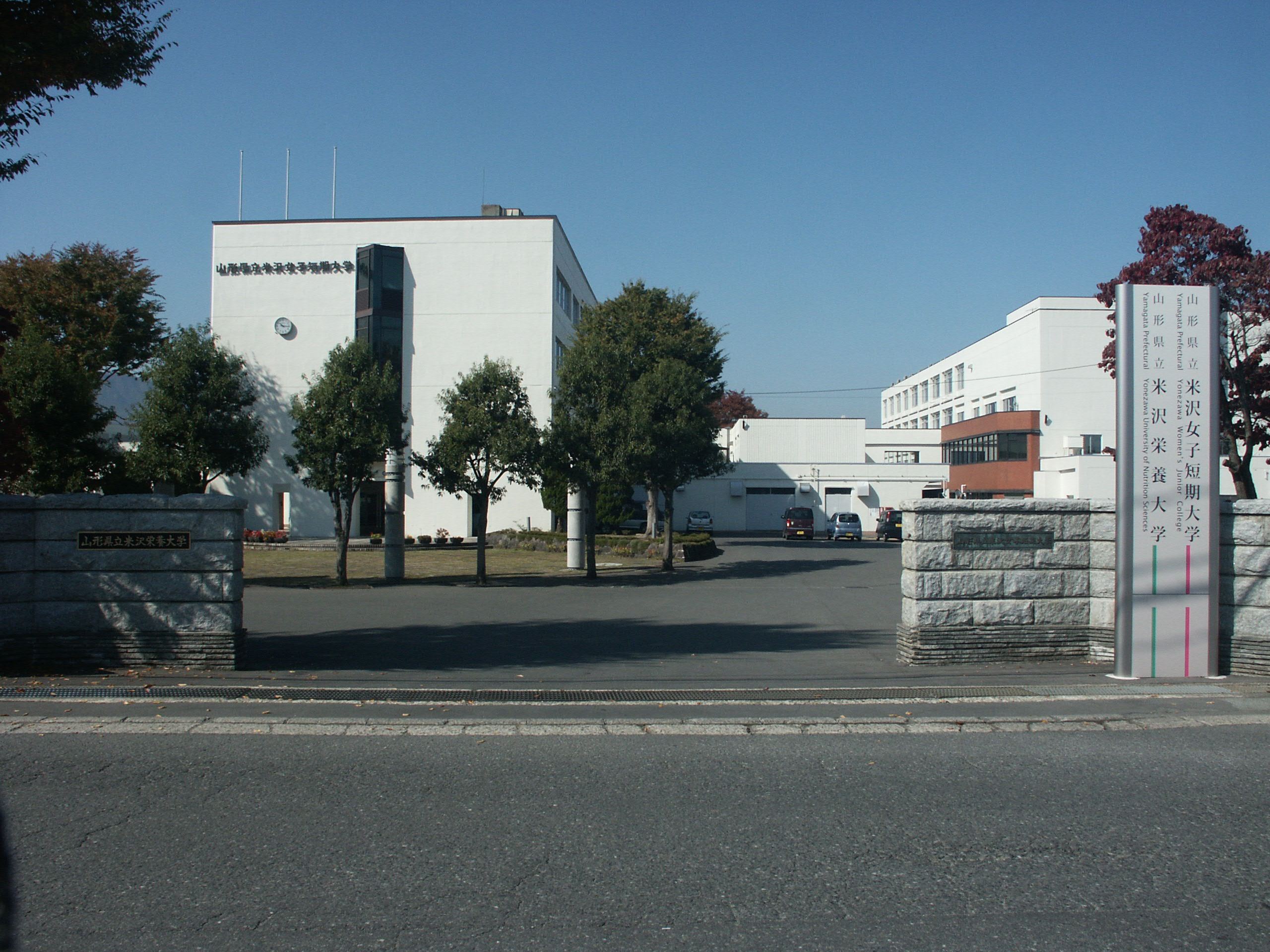
- Entrance to the university and Yonezawa Women's Junior College
- Type: Public
- Established: 2014
- Location: Yonezawa, Yamagata, Japan

Yamagata Prefectural Yonezawa University of Nutrition Sciences (山形県立米沢栄養大学, Yamagata kenritsu Yonezawa eiyō daigaku) is a public university in Yonezawa, Yamagata, Japan.

The university was established in 2014 by reorganizing the Department of Health and Nutrition of Yonezawa Women's Junior College. In 2018 the university established the graduate school (master's program).

== Undergraduate program ==
- Faculty of Health and Nutrition Sciences

== Graduate program ==
- Graduate School of Health and Nutrition Sciences (master's program)
