= Komatsu University =

Japanese public university

Coordinates: 36°21′16.7″N 136°25′1″E

Komatsu University (Japanese: 公立小松大学, Kōritsu Komatsu Daigaku) is a public university in Komatsu, Ishikawa, Japan. It was established in 2018.

== See also ==
- Komatsu College
