= Grape Creek High School =

Coordinates: 31°33′31″N 100°32′36″W

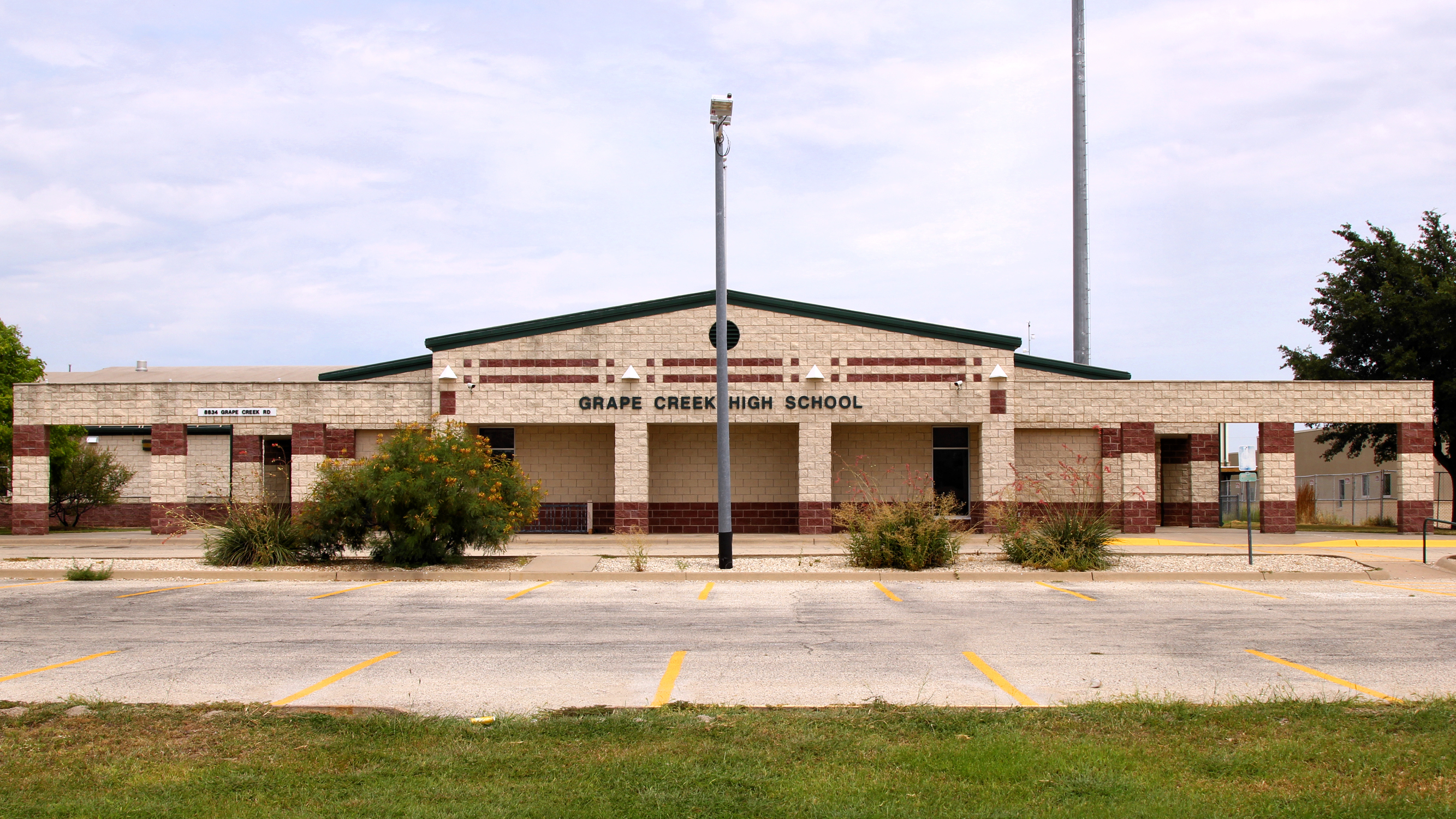

Location
- 8207 N US Hwy 87 North; San Angelo, Texas 76901; United States

Information
- School type: Public high school
- School district: Grape Creek Independent School District
- Principal: Cody Griffin (2025)
- Teaching staff: 27.33 (FTE)
- Grades: 9-12
- Enrollment: 322 (2023-2024)
- Student to teacher ratio: 11.78
- Colors: Hunter green and black
- Athletics conference: UIL Class 3A
- Mascot: Eagle
- Website: Grape Creek High School website

Grape Creek High School is a 3A high school operated by the Grape Creek Independent School District in north central Tom Green County, Texas (USA). It serves the community of Grape Creek, San Angelo, and surrounding rural areas. In 2011, the school was rated "Academically Acceptable" by the Texas Education Agency.

== Athletics ==
The Grape Creek Eagles compete in the following sports: Cross Country, Volleyball, Football, Basketball, Powerlifting, Tennis, Track, Softball & Baseball.
