= Kawasaki City College of Nursing =

Japanese college of nursing

Coordinates: 35°32′8.7″N 139°40′11.4″E

- 川崎市立看護大学; Kawasaki shiritsu kango daigaku
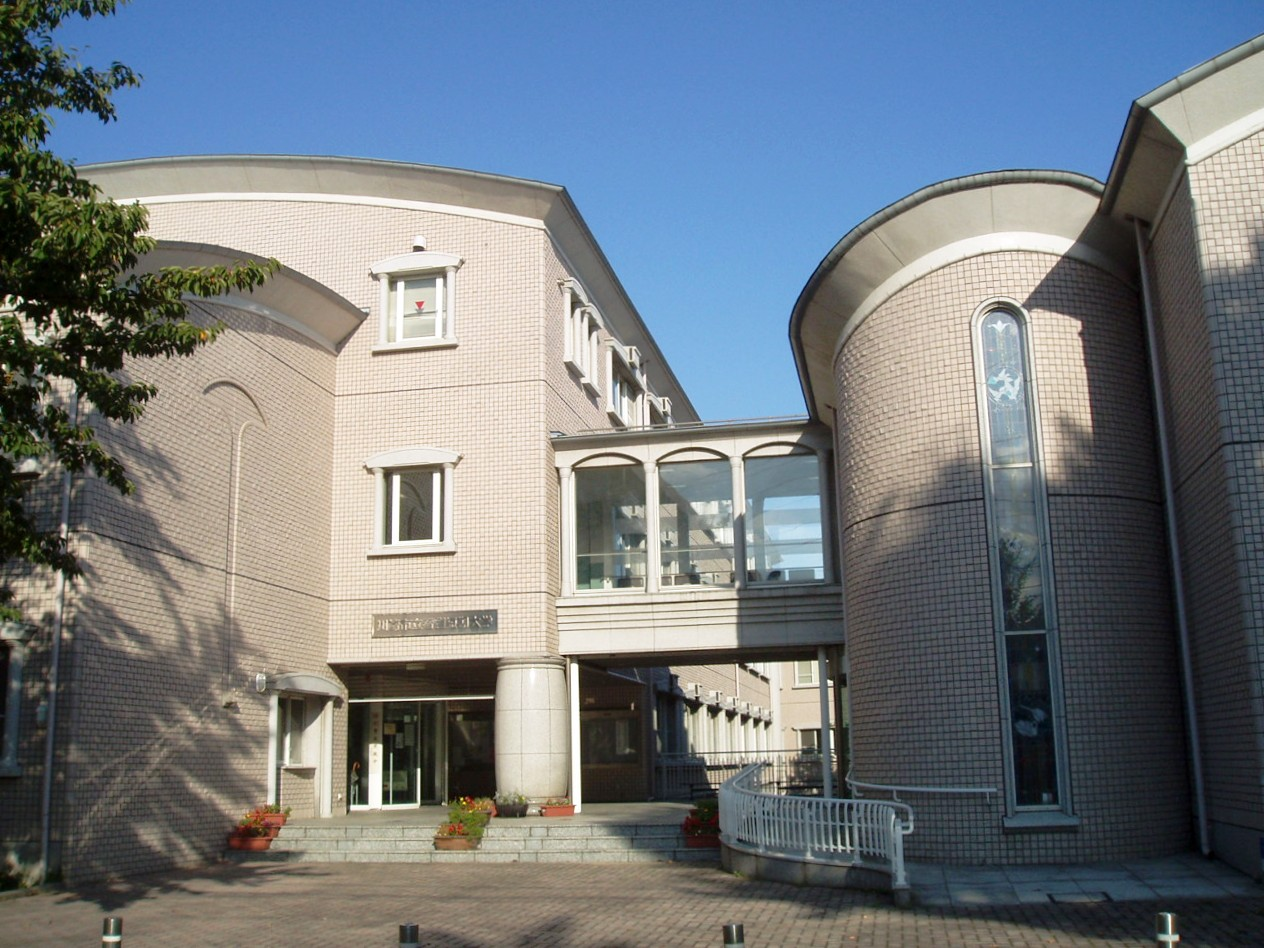
- Main entrance
- Type: Public
- Established: 2002
- Location: Saiwai-ku, Kawasaki, Kanagawa, Japan
- Website: Official website

Kawasaki City College of Nursing (川崎市立看護大学, Kawasaki shiritsu kango daigaku) is a coeducational public college in Saiwai-ku, Kawasaki, Kanagawa Prefecture, Japan. This college was established in 2022.

The site where this college now stands was formerly occupied by a junior college. The predecessor of that junior college was an educational institution established in 1964, which received formal accreditation as a junior college in 1995.

The school specializes in nutrition studies, and in child care.
