= Okinawa Prefectural College of Nursing =

Public university in Naha, Okinawa, Japan

Coordinates: 26.205745°N 127.695107°E

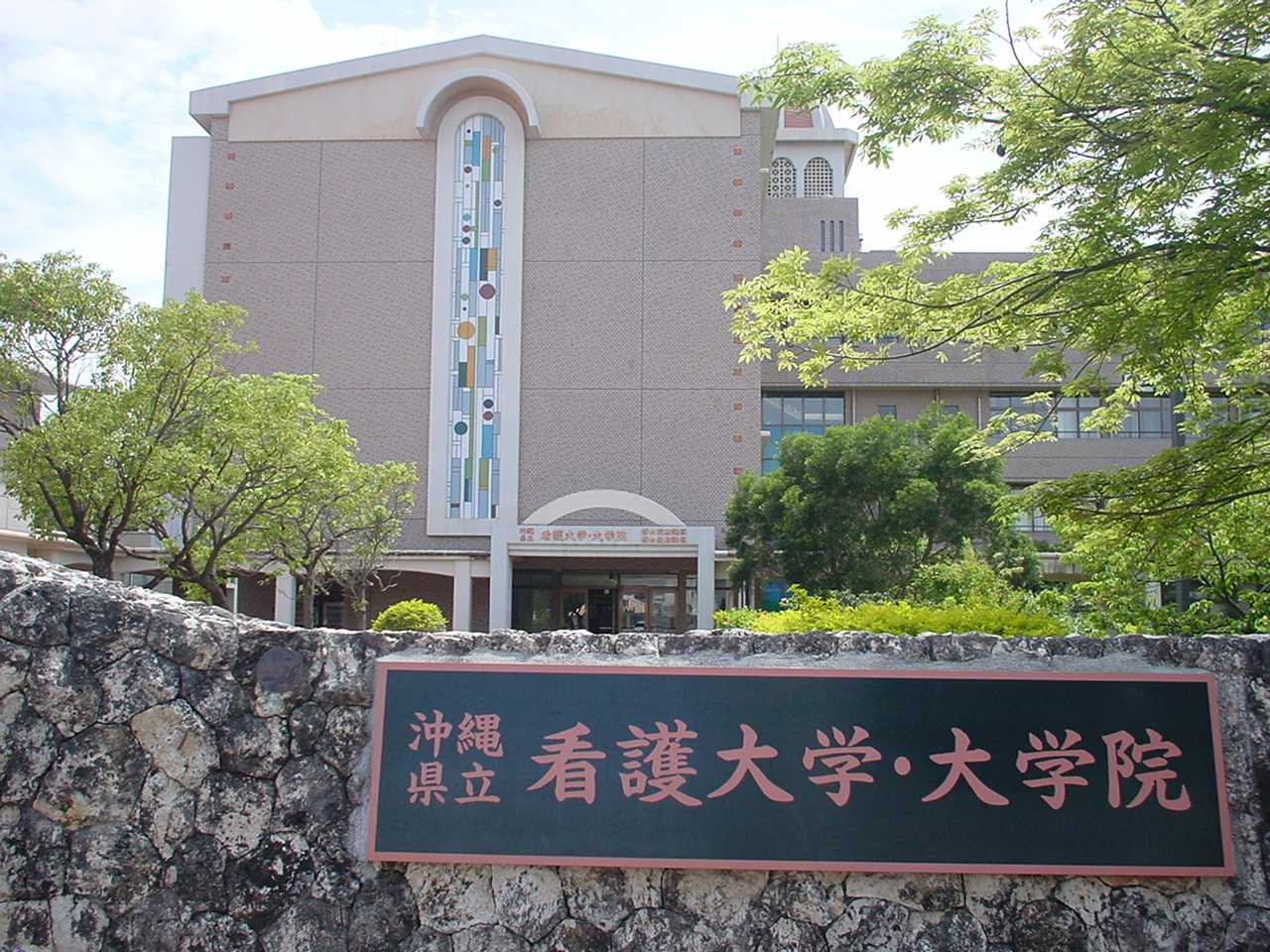
Okinawa Prefectural College of Nursing

Okinawa Prefectural College of Nursing (沖縄県立看護大学, Okinawa kenritsu kango daigaku) is a public university in Naha, Okinawa, Japan. The predecessor of the school was founded in 1946, and it was chartered as a university in 1999.
