= Kanagawa University of Human Services =

Public university in Yokosuka, Japan

Coordinates: 35°16′27″N 139°40′48″E

- 神奈川県立保健福祉大学; Kanagawa kenritsu hoken fukushi daigaku
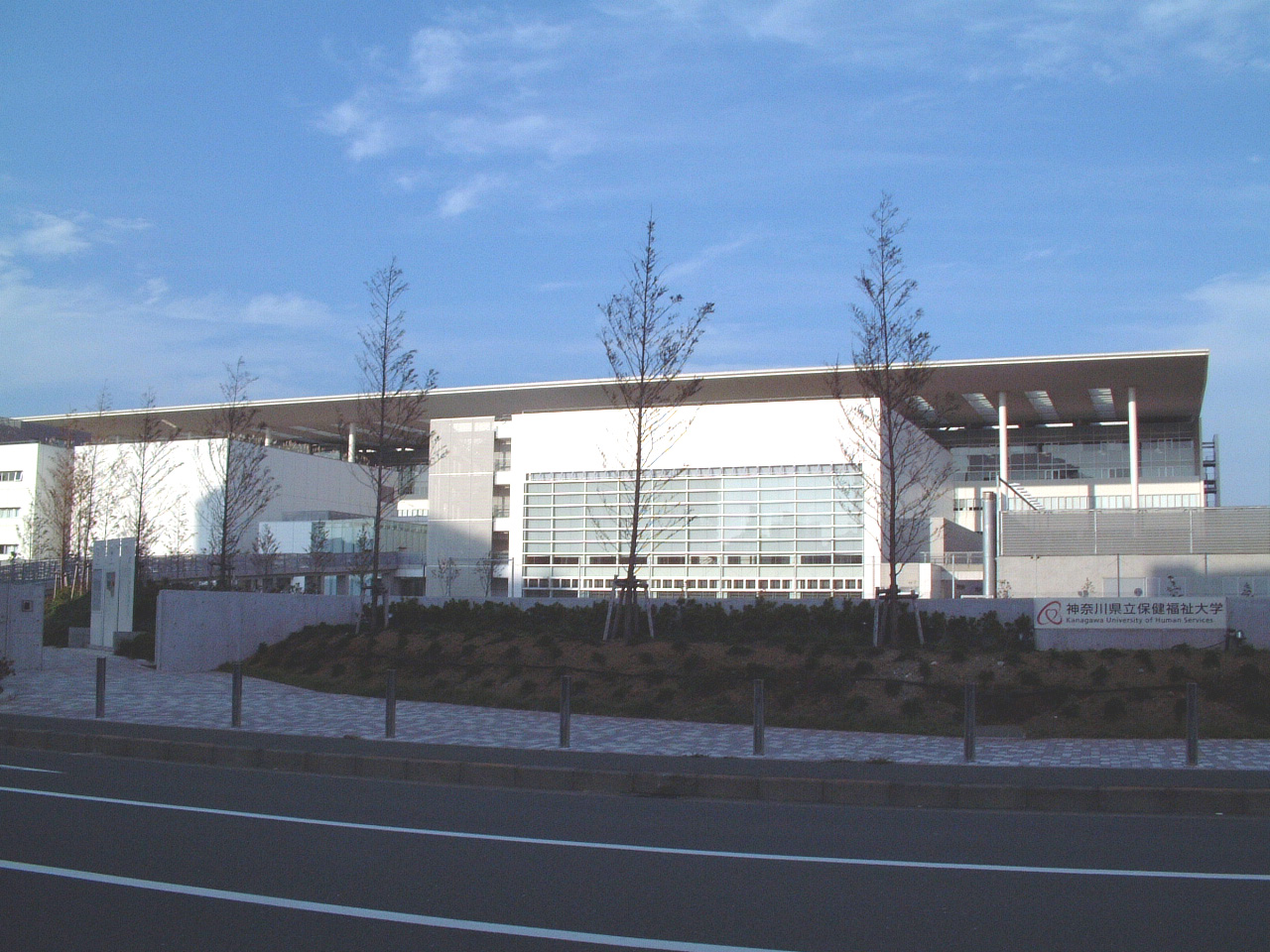
- Type: Public
- Established: 2003
- Location: Yokosuka, Kanagawa, Kanagawa, Japan
- Website: Official website

Kanagawa University of Human Services (神奈川県立保健福祉大学, Kanagawa kenritsu hoken fukushi daigaku) is a public university at Yokosuka, Kanagawa Prefecture, Japan.

The school was established in 2003, and specializes in human welfare studies.
