= Nara Prefectural University =

- 奈良県立大学
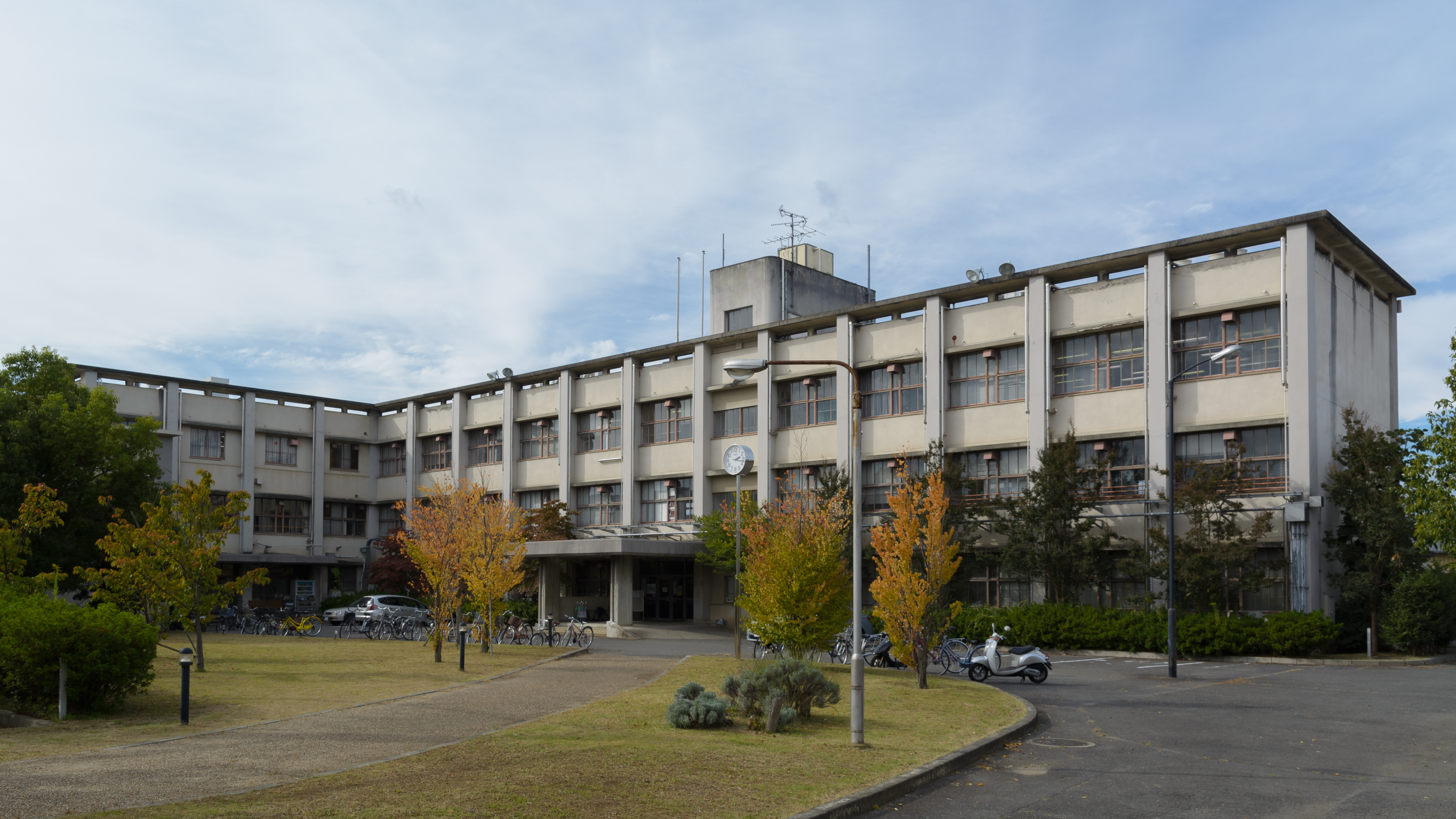
- Nara Prefectural University
- Type: public
- Established: 1953
- Location: 10, Funahashi-chō, Nara, Nara Prefecture, 630-8258, Japan; 34°41′15″N 135°49′16″E
- Colors: Blue and yellow
- Website: www.narapu.ac.jp
- Japan

Nara Prefectural University (奈良県立大学, Nara kenritsu daigaku) is a public university in Nara, Nara, Japan. The predecessor of the school was founded in 1953, and it was chartered as a university in 1990.
