= Gunma Prefectural College of Health Sciences =

Coordinates: 36°24′14″N 139°5′40.7″E

- 群馬県立県民健康科学大学
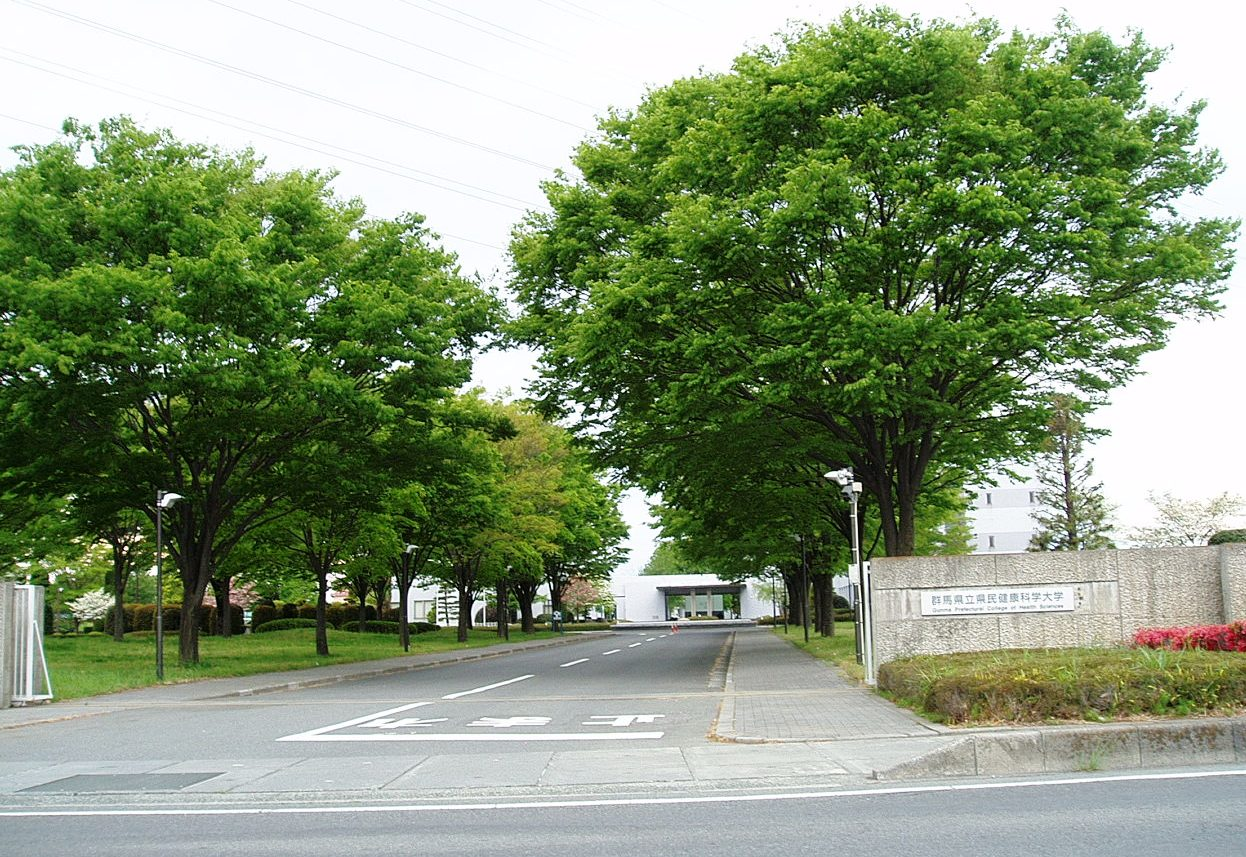
- Type: Public
- Established: 1993 chartered 2005
- Location: Maebashi, Gunma, Japan
- Website: Official home page

Gunma Prefectural College of Health Sciences (群馬県立県民健康科学大学, Gunma kenritsu kenmin kenkou kagaku daigaku) is a public university in Maebashi, Gunma, Japan. The predecessor of the school was founded in 1993, and it was chartered as a university in 2005.
