= Kyoto Prefectural University =

Japanese university

Coordinates: 35°02′50″N 135°46′01″E

- 京都府立大学
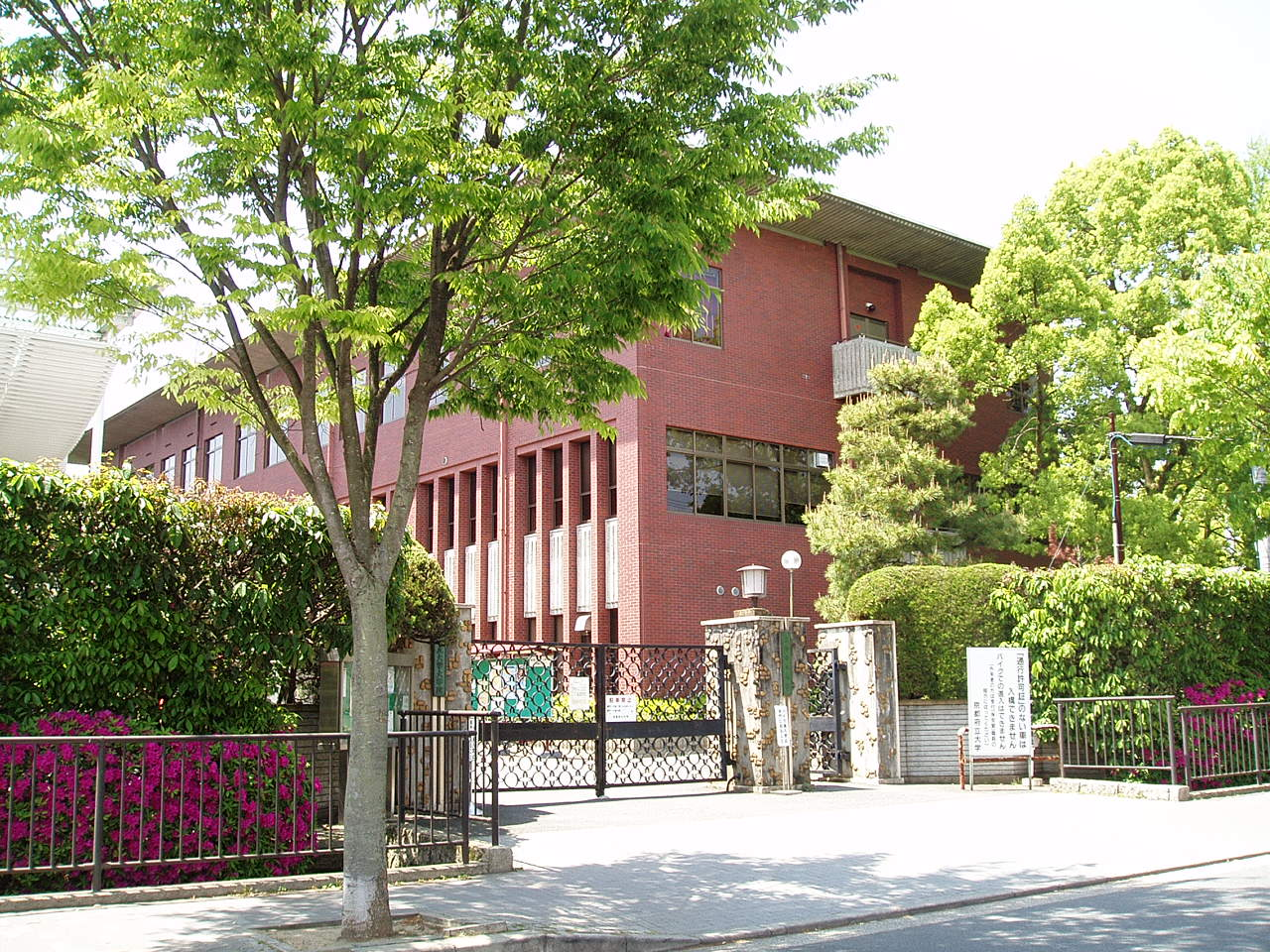
- Type: Public
- Established: Founded 1895; Chartered 1949
- President: Yasuhiro Tsukamoto
- Location: Kyoto, Kyoto, Japan
- Campus: Urban
- Website: Official website

Kyoto Prefectural University (京都府立大学, Kyōto furitsu daigaku), Fudai (府大) or Kyōfudai (京府大) for short, is a public university in Japan. Its campus is located in Nakaragi-cho, Shimogamo, Sakyo-ku, Kyoto.

== History ==
Kyoto Prefectural University was established in 1949 as Saikyo University (西京大学, Saikyō daigaku) by mingling two prefectural colleges: Kyoto Prefectural Agricultural and Forestry Vocational School (京都府立農林専門学校 Kyōto furitsu nōrin semmon gakkō, founded in 1895) and Kyoto Prefectural Women's Vocational School (京都府立女子専門学校 Kyōto furitsu joshi semmon gakkō, founded in 1927).

Saikyo University had at first two faculties: the Faculty of Letters and Domestic Science (in Katsura Campus) / the Faculty of Agriculture (in Shimogamo Campus). The brief history of the university is as follows:

- 1951: The Faculty of Women's Junior College was established (in Katsura Campus).
- 1959: The University was renamed Kyoto Prefectural University.
- 1962: All the faculties were integrated in Shimogamo Campus (Katsura Campus was abolished).
- 1970: The Faculty of Letters and Domestic Science was reorganized into two faculties.
  The Graduate School of Agriculture was established (Master's courses).
- 1977: The Faculty of Domestic Science was renamed Faculty of Living Science.
- 1983: A Doctoral course was added to the Graduate School of Agriculture.
- 1986: The Graduate School of Living Science was established (Master's courses).
- 1990: The Graduate School of Letters was established (Master's courses).
- 1997: The Faculty of Living Science was reorganized into two faculties: the Faculty of Welfare Society and the Faculty of Human Environment.
- 1998: The Faculty of Women's Junior College was abolished.
- 2001: Doctoral courses were added to the Graduate School of Letters.
  The Graduate School of Welfare Society was established.
  The Graduate School of Living Science was renamed Graduate School of Human Environment Science (with Doctoral courses).
- 2008: The faculties and graduate schools were reorganized.
- 2011: The Seika Campus was established.
- 2014: The Kyoto Institute of Japanese Food Culture was established.
- 2017: The university library was newly opened within the Rekisaikan, Kyoto Institute, Library and Archives and the Kyoto Institute for Regional Prospects (KIRP) was established.
- 2019: The Department of Japanese Food Culture was established in the Faculty of Letters.
- 2021: The Industry Liaison Office, the AI Data Science Education and Research Center, the Disaster and Epidemic Prevention Research Center, and the Center for Frontier Science History were all newly established.

== Undergraduate Schools ==
- Faculty of Letters
- Faculty of Welfare Society
- Faculty of Human Environment
- Faculty of Agriculture

The faculties above were reorganized into three new faculties (in April 2008):

- Faculty of Letters
- Faculty of Public Policy
- Faculty of Life and Environmental Sciences

== Graduate Schools ==
- Graduate School of Letters
- Graduate School of Welfare Society
- Graduate School of Human Environment Science
- Graduate School of Agriculture

The graduate schools above were reorganized into three new schools (in April 2008):

- Graduate School of Letters
- Graduate School of Public Policy
- Graduate School of Life and Environmental Sciences

== Institutes ==
- Attached Library
- Farm attached to the Faculty of Agriculture
