= Saitama Prefectural University =

Higher education institution in Saitama Prefecture, Japan

Coordinates: 35°55′47.9″N 139°45′18.8″E

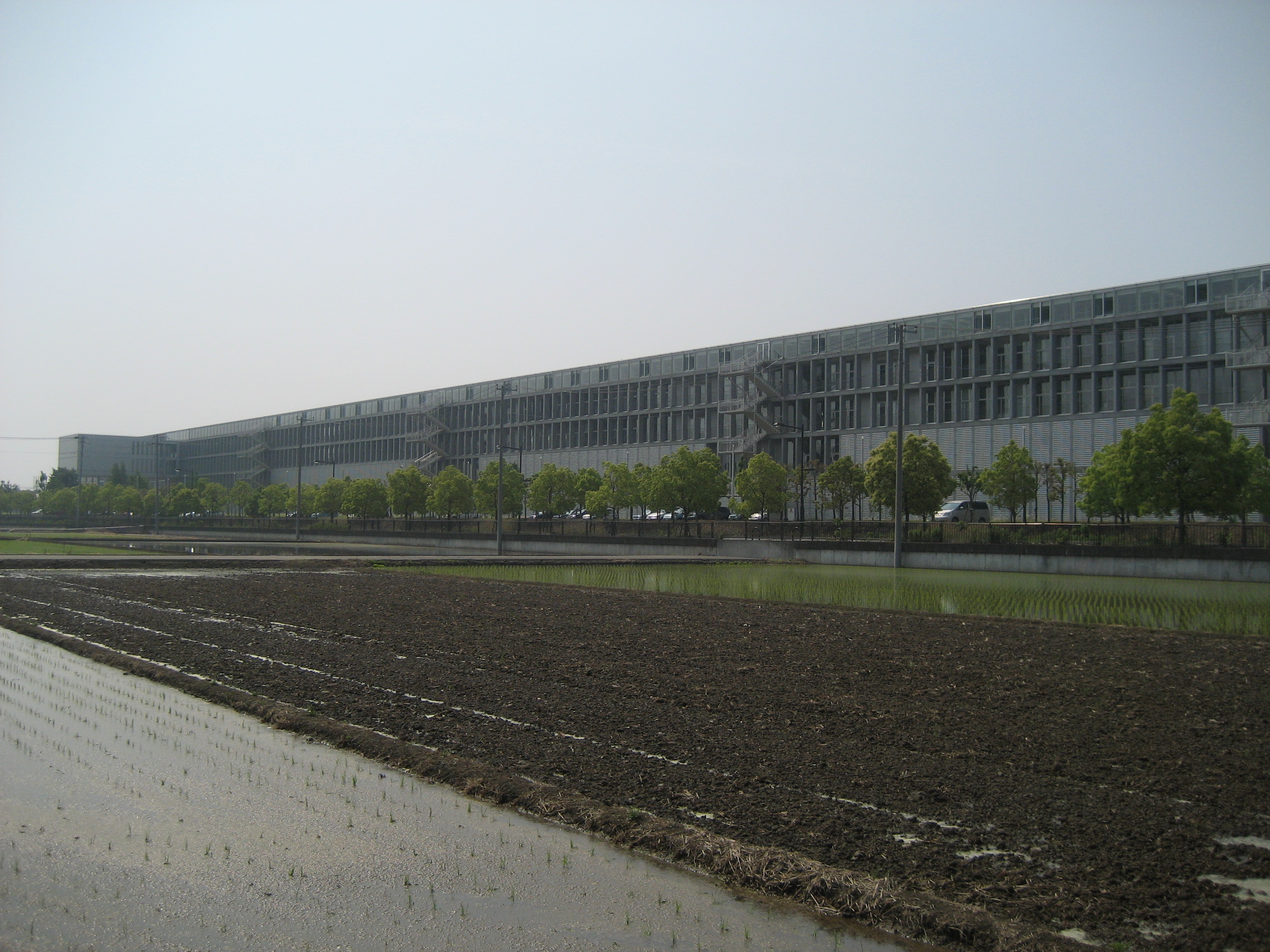
Saitama Prefectural University

Saitama Prefectural University (埼玉県立大学, Saitama kenritsu daigaku) is a public university in Sengendai, Koshigaya, Saitama, Japan.

== History ==
The school was established in 1999.
