= Ashikaga Flower Park Station =

Railway station in Ashikaga, Tochigi Prefecture, Japan

Ashikaga Flower Park Station あしかがフラワーパーク駅
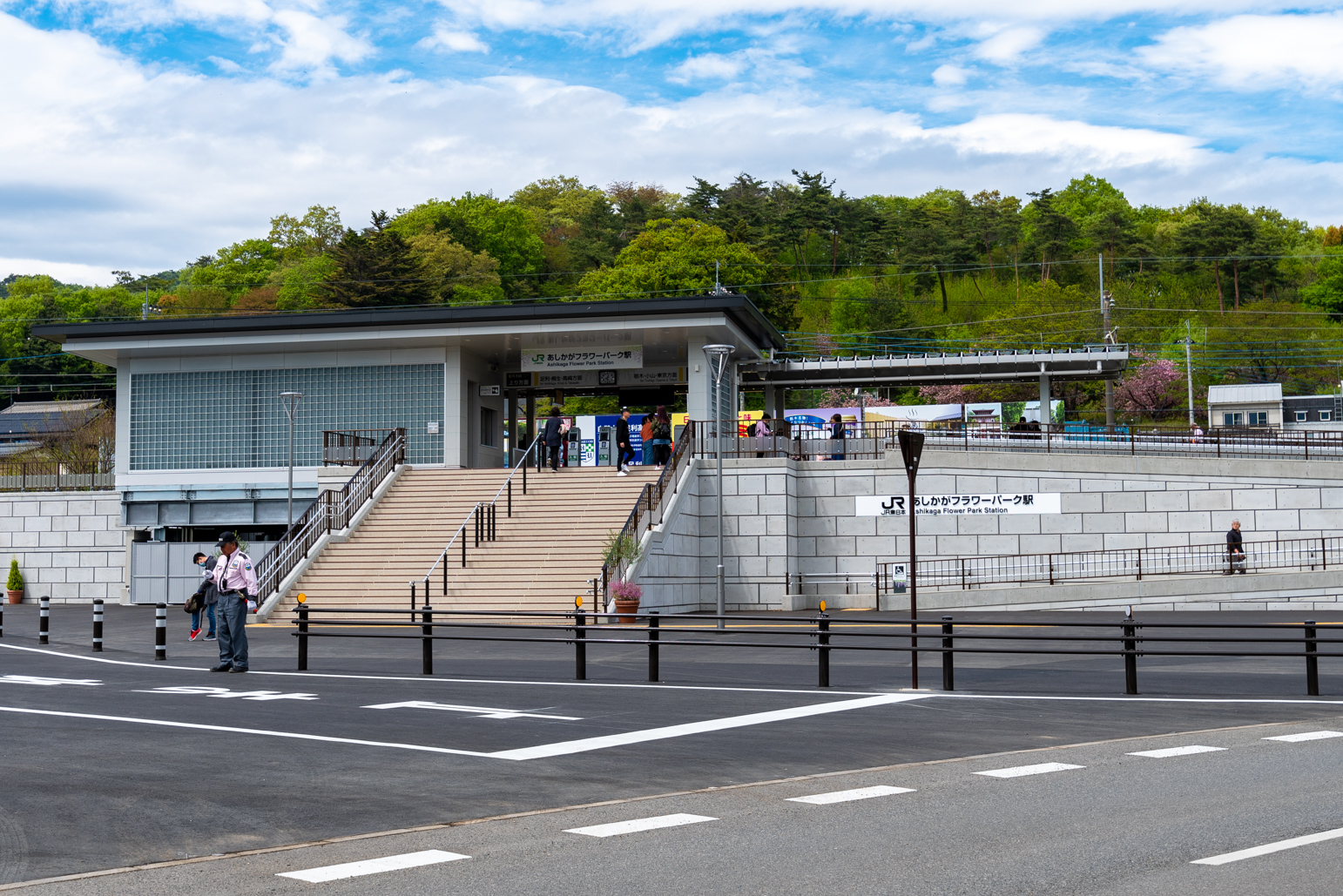
- Ashikaga Flower Park Station in April 2018

General information
- Location: Hasama-cho, Ashikaga-shi, Tochigi-ken 329-4216; Japan
- Coordinates: 36.315167°N 139.518611°E
- Operator: JR East
- Line: Ryōmō Line
- Distance: 32.0 km (19.9 mi) from Oyama
- Platforms: 1 side platform
- Tracks: 1

Other information
- Status: Unstaffed
- Website: Official website

History
- Opened: 1 April 2018; 8 years ago

Services
Preceding station	JR East	Following station
Ashikaga towards Takasaki	Ryōmō Line	Tomita towards Oyama
Location
- Location within Tochigi Prefecture Location within Japan

Ashikaga Flower Park Station (あしかがフラワーパーク駅, Ashikaga Furawā Pāku-eki) is a railway station on the Ryōmō Line in Ashikaga, Tochigi, Japan, operated by East Japan Railway Company (JR East). The station is named after the nearby Ashikaga Flower Park. This station is the newest station on the Ryōmō Line.

== Lines ==
Ashikaga Flower Park Station is served by the Ryōmō Line, and is located 32.0 km (19.9 mi) from the starting point of the line at Oyama, and 59.7 km (37.1 mi) from Takasaki. The preceding station of Tomita is 0.9 km (0.56 mi) away and the following station of Ashikaga is 6.2 km (3.9 mi) away.

== Station layout ==
The station consists of one side platform serving traffic in both directions. The station is unattended. Ashikaga Flower Park has a Braille fare table, and no other accessibility features.

=== Platform ===
-	■ Ryōmō Line	for Sano, Tochigi and Oyama
-	■ Ryōmō Line	for Kiryu, Isesaki, Maebashi, and Takasaki

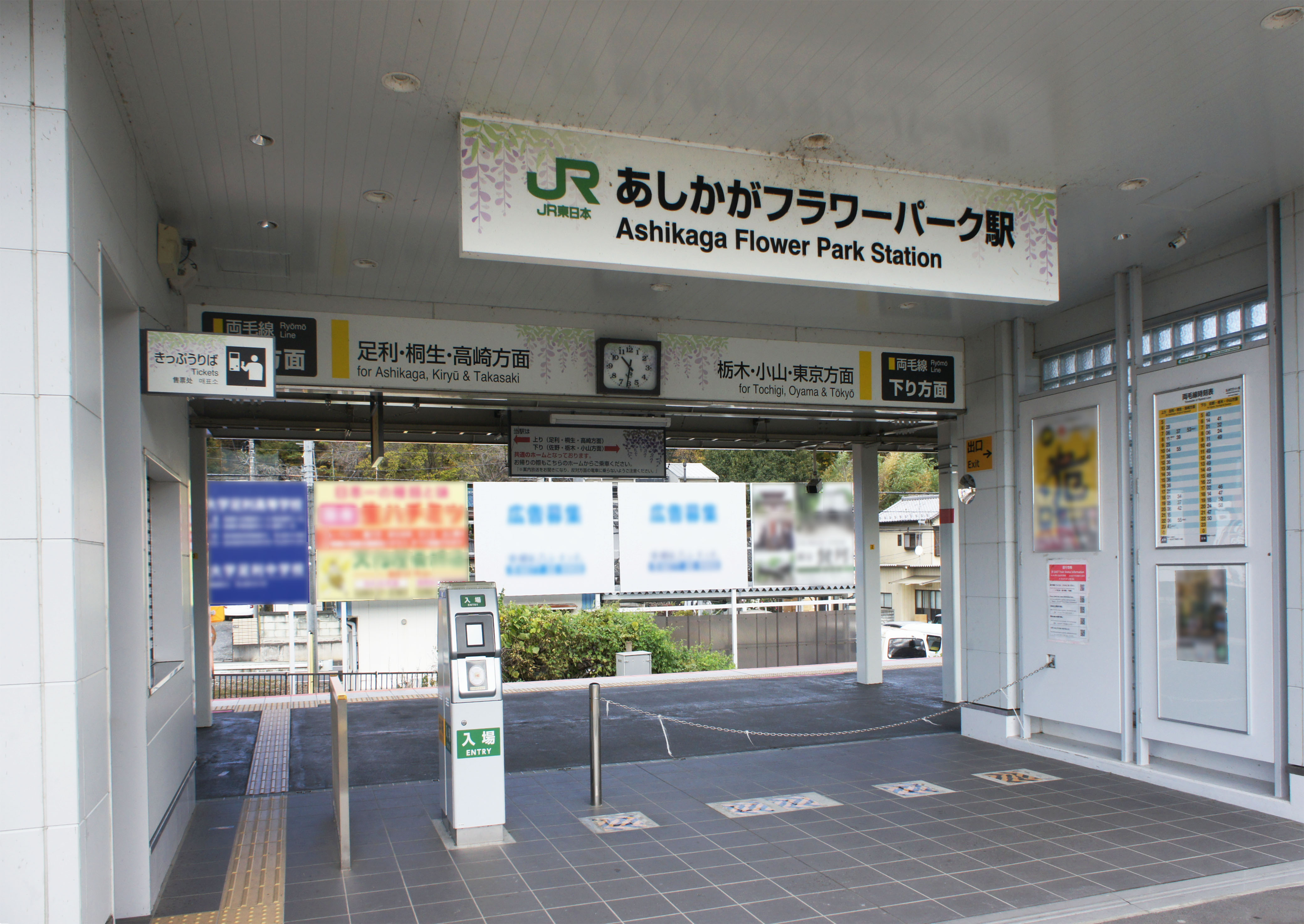
Ticket Gate November 2021

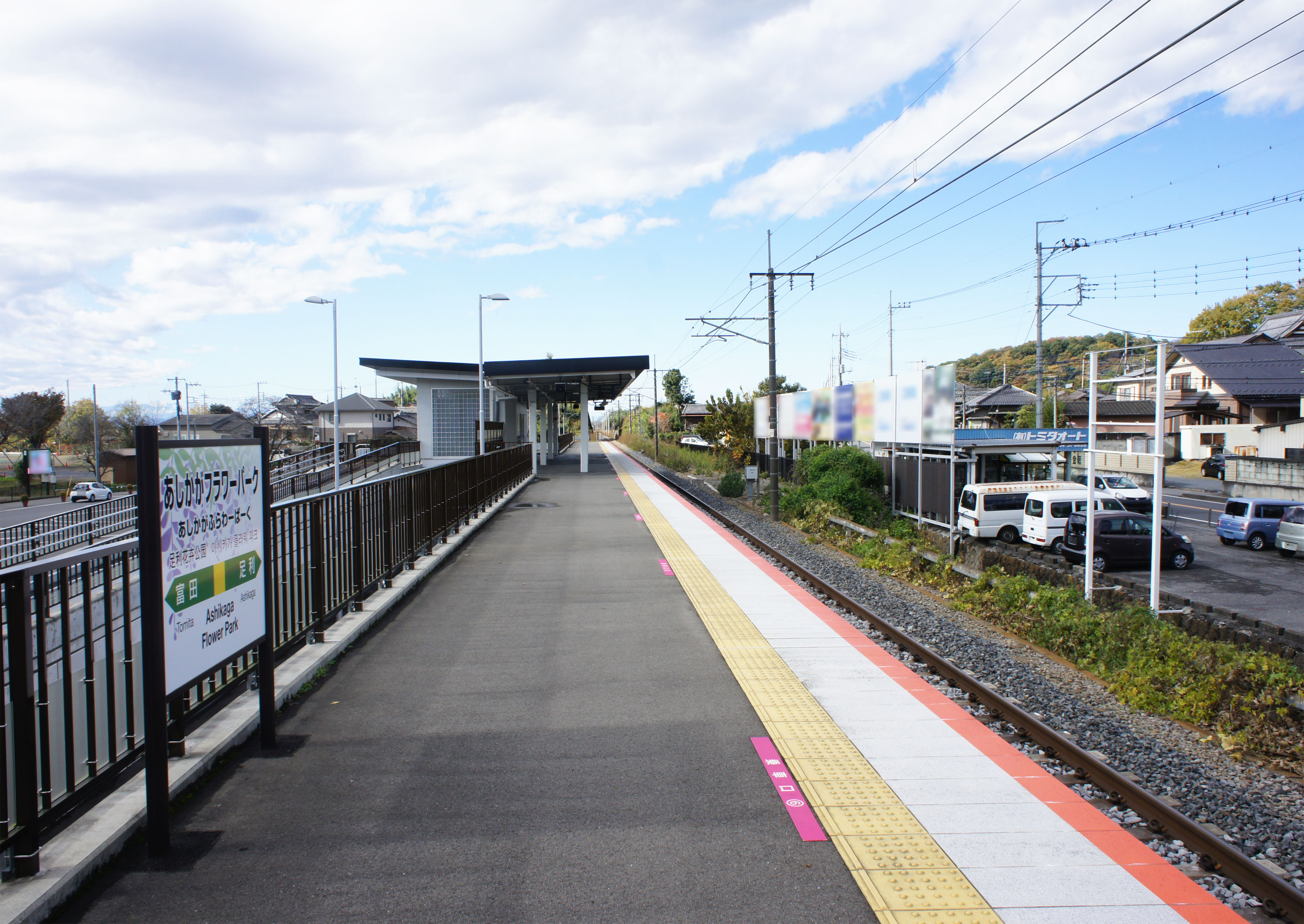
Platform November 2021

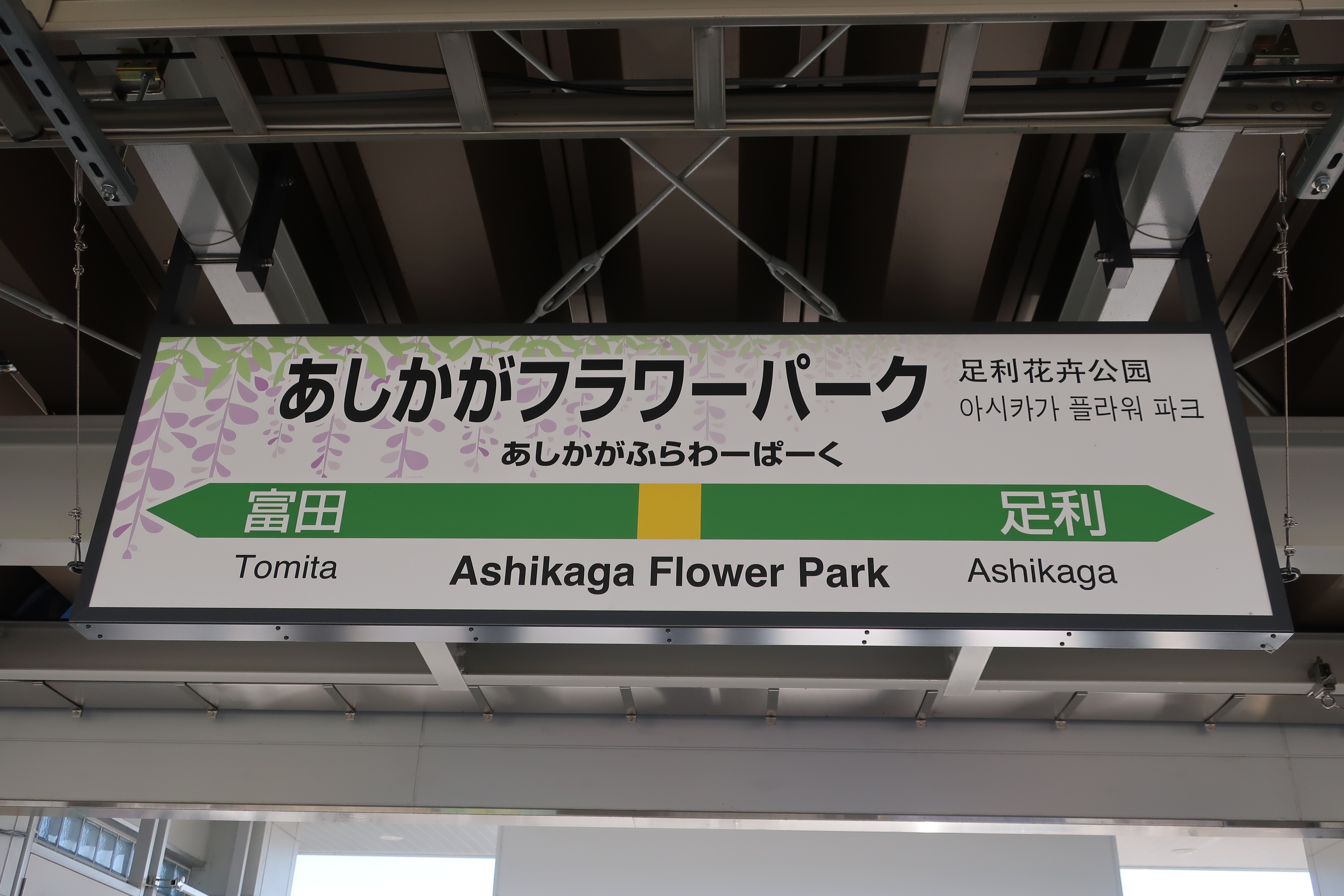
Platform Sign December 2019

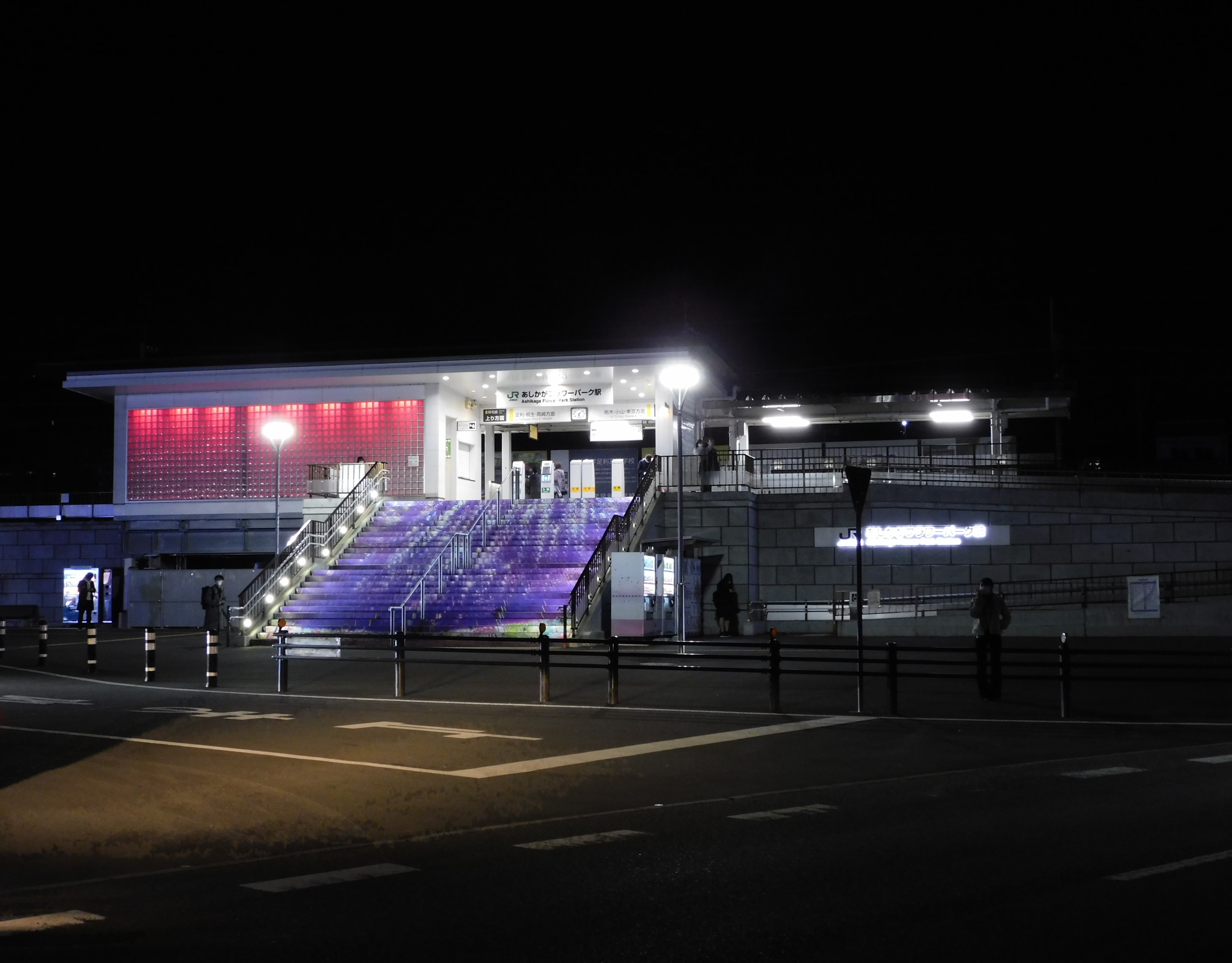
Station During the Night in Winter December 2021

== History ==
Construction of the new station started in August 2017. The total construction costs of ¥819 million are to be shared between JR East (¥323 million), Ashikaga City (¥396 million), and Tochigi Prefecture (¥100 million).

The name of the new station was announced by JR East in December 2017. The station opened on 1 April 2018.

== Passenger statistics ==
JR East has never reported the passenger numbers for Ashikaga Flower Park Station.

== Surrounding area ==
- Ashikaga Flower Park (足利フラワーパーク)
- Kurita Museum
- Prefecture Route 67

== See also ==
- List of railway stations in Japan
