= Omata Station =

Railway station in Ashikaga, Tochigi Prefecture, Japan

Omata Station 小俣駅
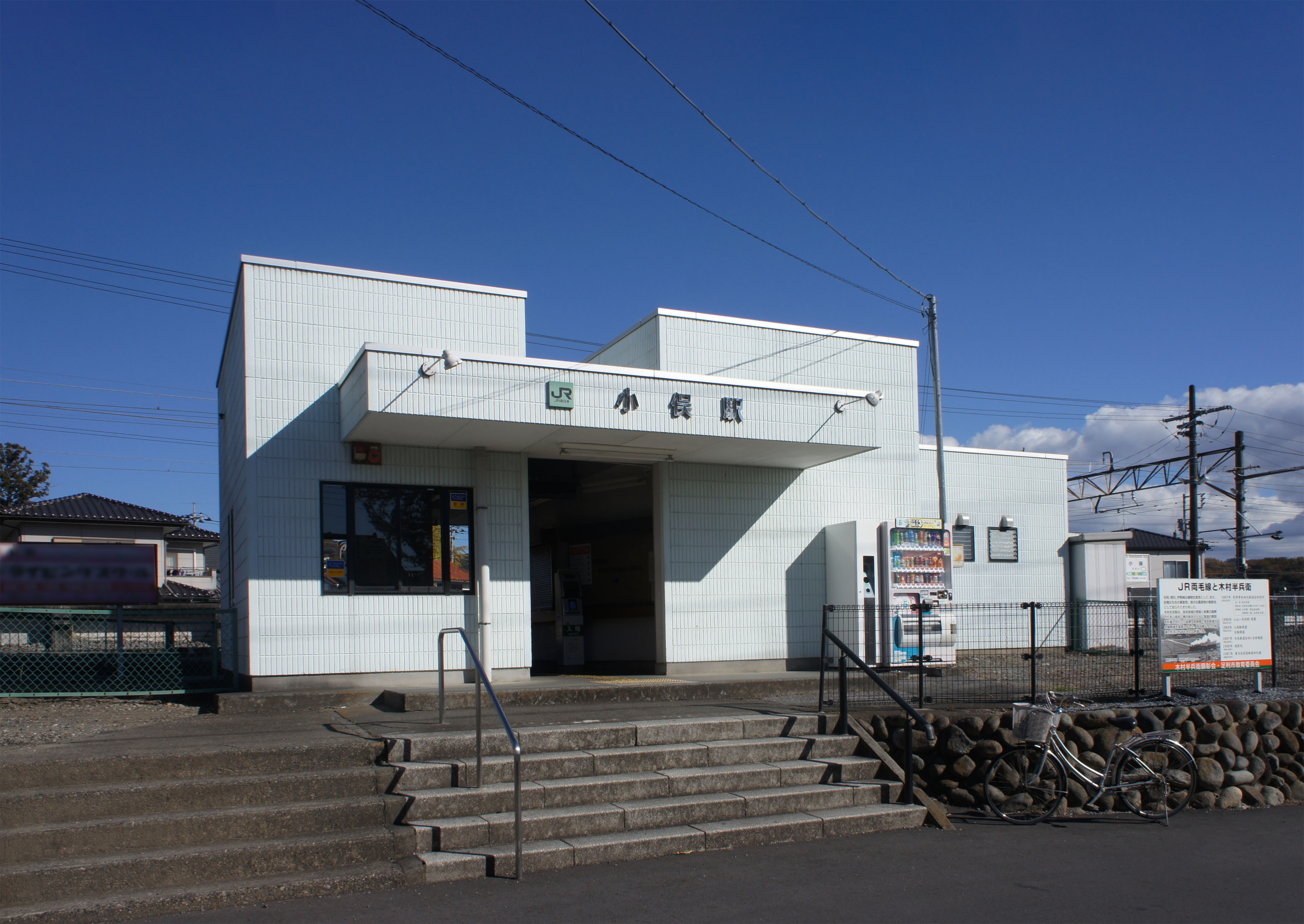
- Omata Station in November 2021

General information
- Location: Omata-cho, Ashikaga-shi, Tochigi-ken 326-0141; Japan
- Coordinates: 36.3752°N 139.374°E
- Line: Ryōmō Line
- Distance: 47.3 km (29.4 mi) from Oyama
- Platforms: 1 island platform
- Tracks: 2

Other information
- Status: Unstaffed
- Website: Official website

History
- Opened: 10 October 1889

Passengers
- FY2002: 485 daily

Services
Preceding station	JR East	Following station
Kiryū towards Takasaki	Ryōmō Line	Yamamae towards Oyama
Location
- Location within Tochigi Prefecture Location within Japan

Omata Station (小俣駅, Omata-eki) is a railway station in the city of Ashikaga, Tochigi, Japan, operated by the East Japan Railway Company (JR East). It is the westernmost station in Tochigi Prefecture.

== Lines ==
Omata Station is served by the Ryōmō Line, and is located 47.3 km (29.4 mi) from the starting point of the line at Oyama, and 44.4 km (27.6 mi) from Takasaki. The preceding station of Yamamae is 4.6 km (2.9 mi) away and the following station of Kiryū is 5.6 km (3.5 mi) away.

== Station layout ==
Omata Station has a single island platform connected to the station building by a footbridge. The station is unnamed with a simple ticket gate, ticket vending machine and has no accessibility features.

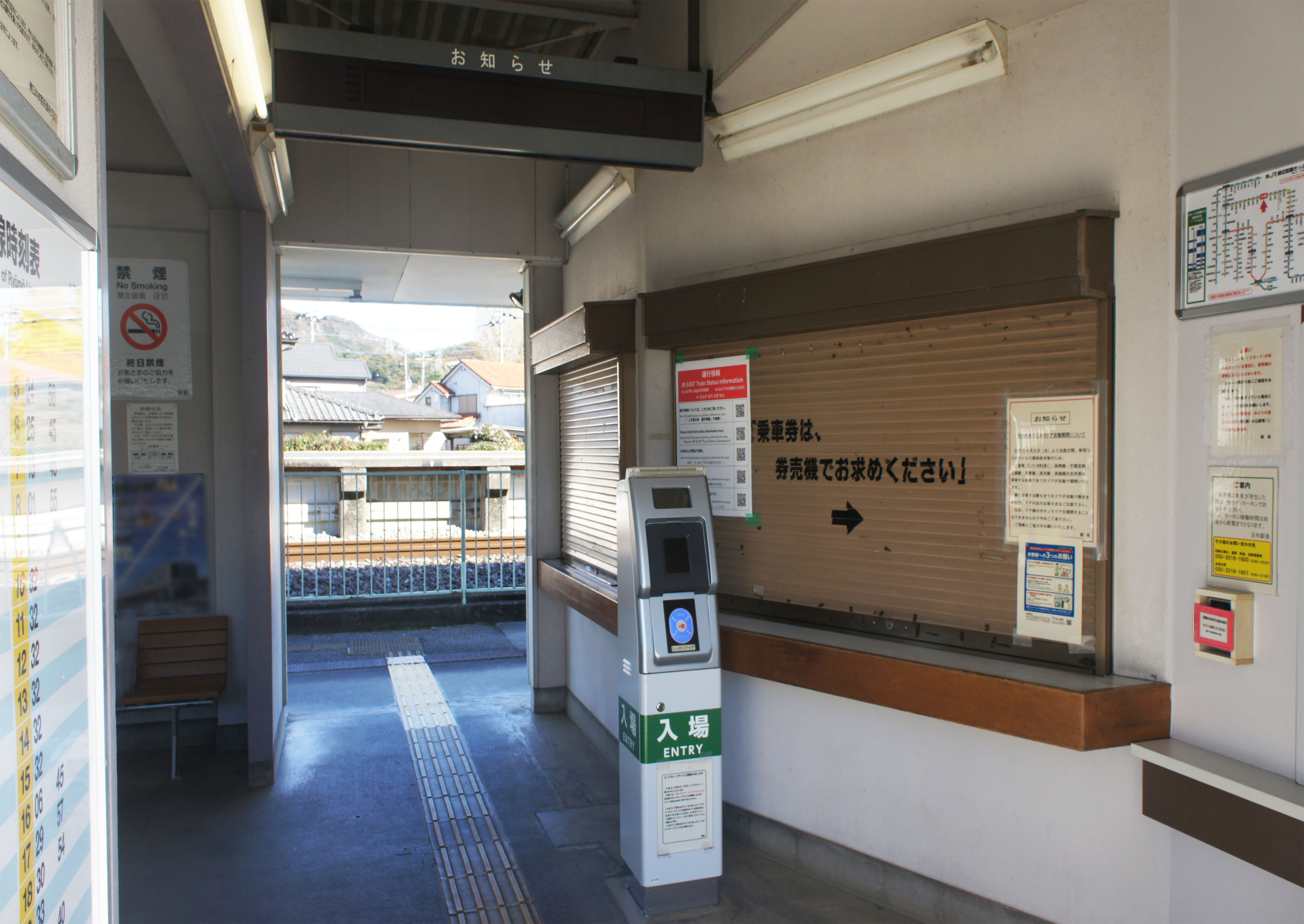
Ticket Gate November 2021

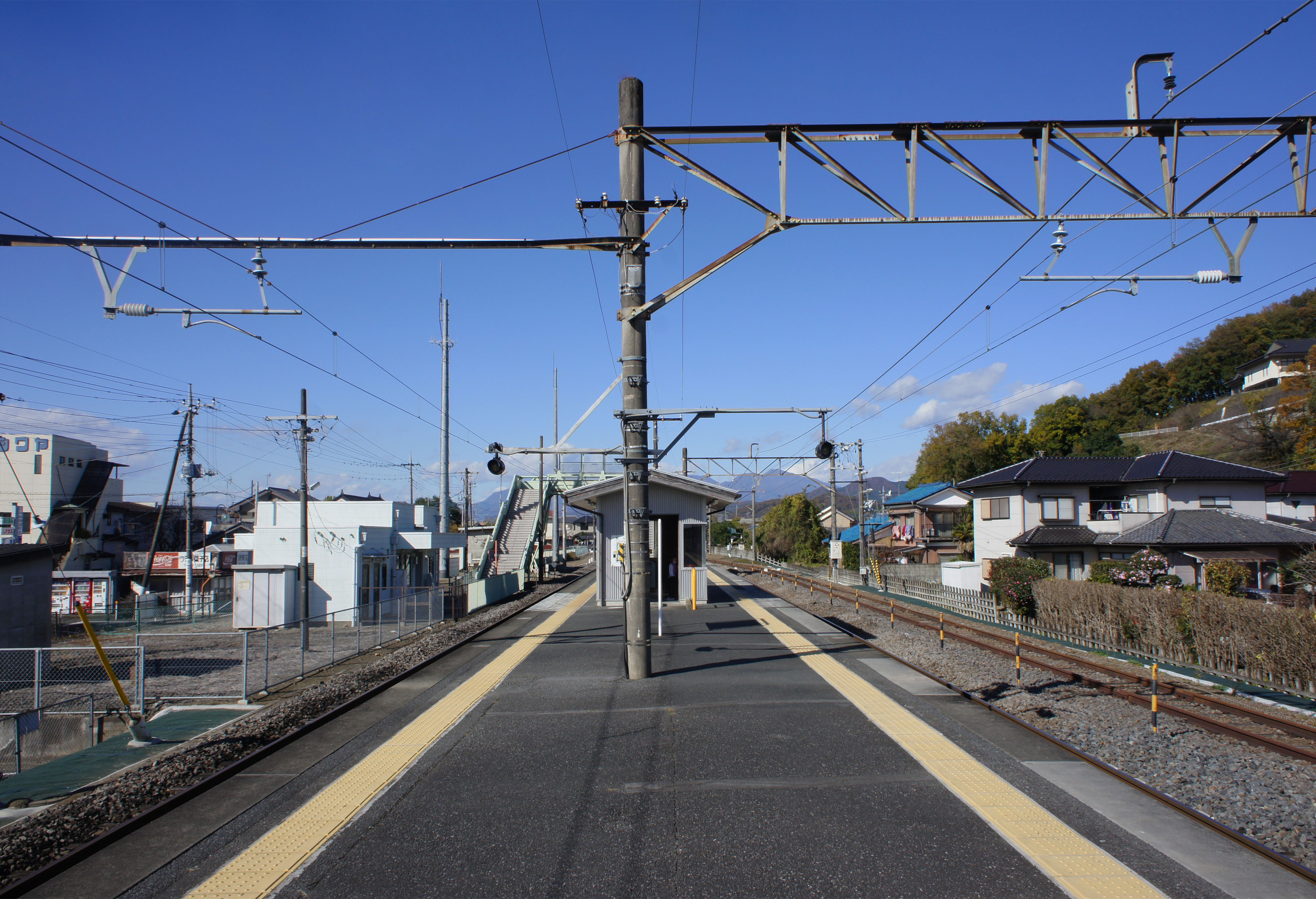
Platforms November 2011

=== Platforms ===
1	■ Ryōmō Line	for Kiryu, Isesaki, Maebashi, and Takasaki
2	■ Ryōmō Line	for Ashikaga, Tochigi, and Oyama

== History ==
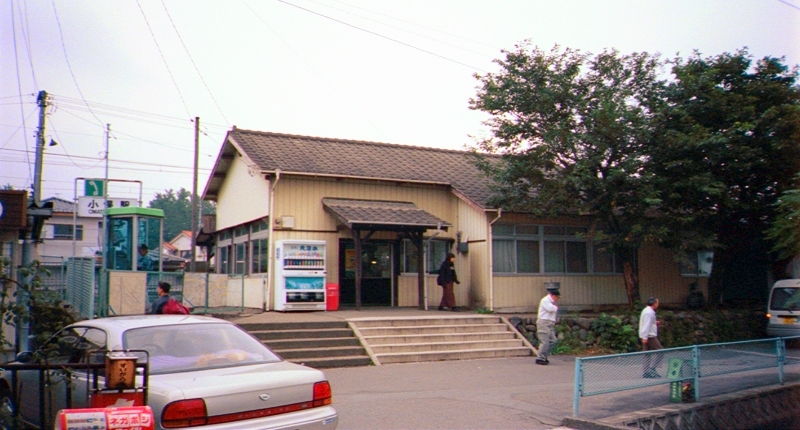
Old building of Omata Station October 1996

The station opened on 10 October 1889. With the privatization of JNR on 1 April 1987, the station came under the control of JR East.

The station started accepting Suica cards on November 18, 2001. In 2019, a plaque commemorating Hanbei Kimura, the creator of the Ryōmō Railway, was installed in front of the station to commemorate his contribution.

== Passenger statistics ==
In fiscal 2002, the station was used by an average of 485 passengers daily (boarding passengers only). Since 2003, JR East has not reported the passenger numbers for Omata Station.

Below is table containing the passenger statistics from the year 2000 to the year 2002:

Passenger statistics
Year	Average Daily Boarding Passengers
2000	593
2001	540
2002	485

== Surrounding area ==
- Watarase River
- Ashikaga Omata Post Office

== See also ==
- List of railway stations in Japan
