= Tomita Station =

Railway station in Ashikaga, Tochigi Prefecture, Japan

Tomita Station 富田駅
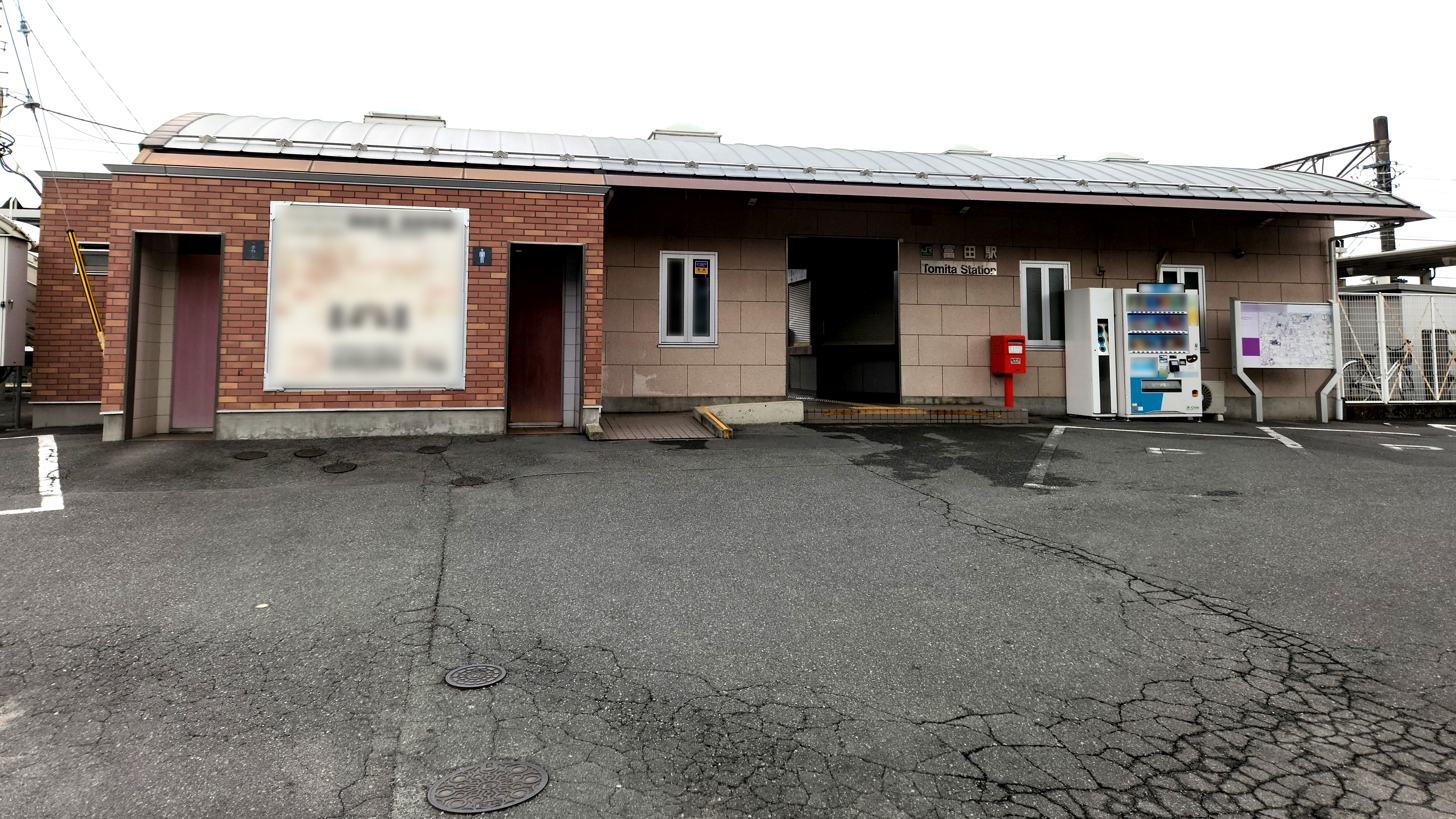
- Tomita Station in May 2022

General information
- Location: Komaba-cho, Ashikaga-shi, Tochigi-ken 329-4217; Japan
- Coordinates: 36.316083°N 139.528778°E
- Operator: JR East
- Line: ■ Ryōmō Line
- Distance: 31.1 km from Oyama
- Platforms: 1 side + 1 island platform
- Tracks: 2

Other information
- Status: Unstaffed
- Website: www.jreast.co.jp/estation/station/info.aspx?StationCd=1064

History
- Opened: 18 February 1893

Passengers
- FY2016: 1049

Services
Preceding station	JR East	Following station
Ashikaga Flower Park towards Takasaki	Ryōmō Line	Sano towards Oyama
Location
- Location within Tochigi Prefecture Location within Japan

Tomita Station (富田駅, Tomita-eki) is a railway station in the city of Ashikaga, Tochigi, Japan, operated by the East Japan Railway Company (JR East).

== Lines ==
Tomita Station is served by the Ryōmō Line, and is located 31.1 km from the terminus of the line at Oyama Station.

== Station layout ==
Tomita Station has one side platform (platform 1) and an island platform connected to the station building by a footbridge. The track for the former platform 3 has been removed.

=== Platforms ===
1	■ Ryōmō Line	for Ashikaga, Kiryu, Isesaki, Maebashi, and Takasaki
2	■ Ryōmō Line	for Sano, Tochigi, and Oyama

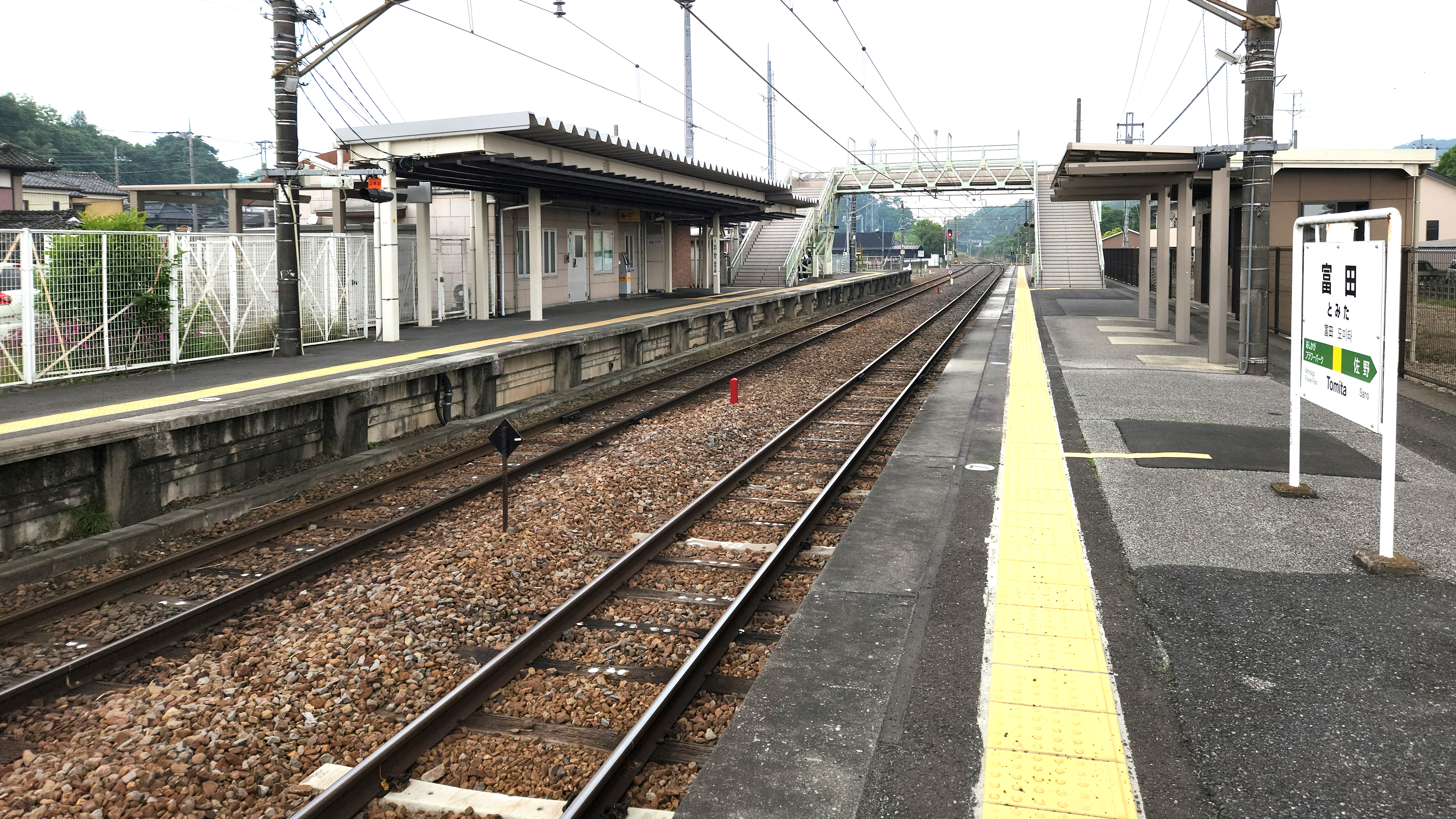
The platforms, May 2022

== History ==
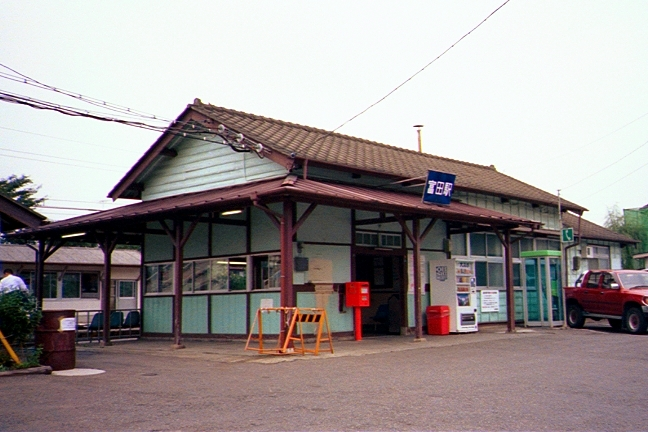
The station in October 1996 before rebuilding

Tomita Station opened on 18 February 1893. With the privatization of JNR on 1 April 1987, the station came under the control of JR East. A new station building was completed in March 1999.

== Passenger statistics ==
In fiscal 2016, the station was used by an average of 1049 passengers daily (boarding passengers only).

== Surrounding area ==
- Tomita Post Office
- Kurita Museum

== See also ==
- List of railway stations in Japan
