= Ashikaga, Tochigi =

Ashikaga 足利市
- City
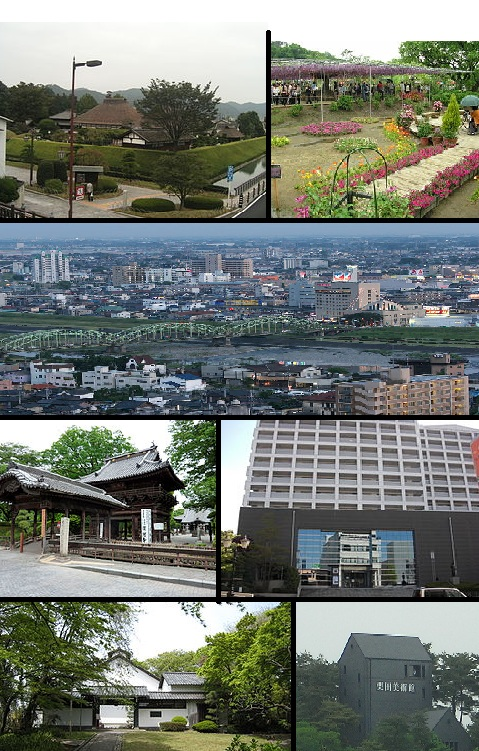
- From top, Ashikaga School, Ashikaga Flower Park, View of Downtown Ashikaga and Watarase River, Banna-ji, Ashikaga Municipal Art Museum, Soun Art Museum, Kurita Art Museum

- Flag Emblem

- Location of Ashikaga in Tochigi Prefecture

- Coordinates: 36°20′24.6″N 139°26′59″E
- Country: Japan
- Region: Kantō
- Prefecture: Tochigi

Area
  - Total: 177.76 km^{2} (68.63 sq mi)

Population (June 1, 2023)
  - Total: 140,036
  - Density: 787.78/km^{2} (2,040.3/sq mi)
- Time zone: UTC+9 (Japan Standard Time)
- Tree: Maple
- Flower: Azalea
- Phone number: 0284-20-2222
- Address: 3-2145 Honjo, Ashikaga-shi, Tochigi-ken 326-8601
- Website: Official website

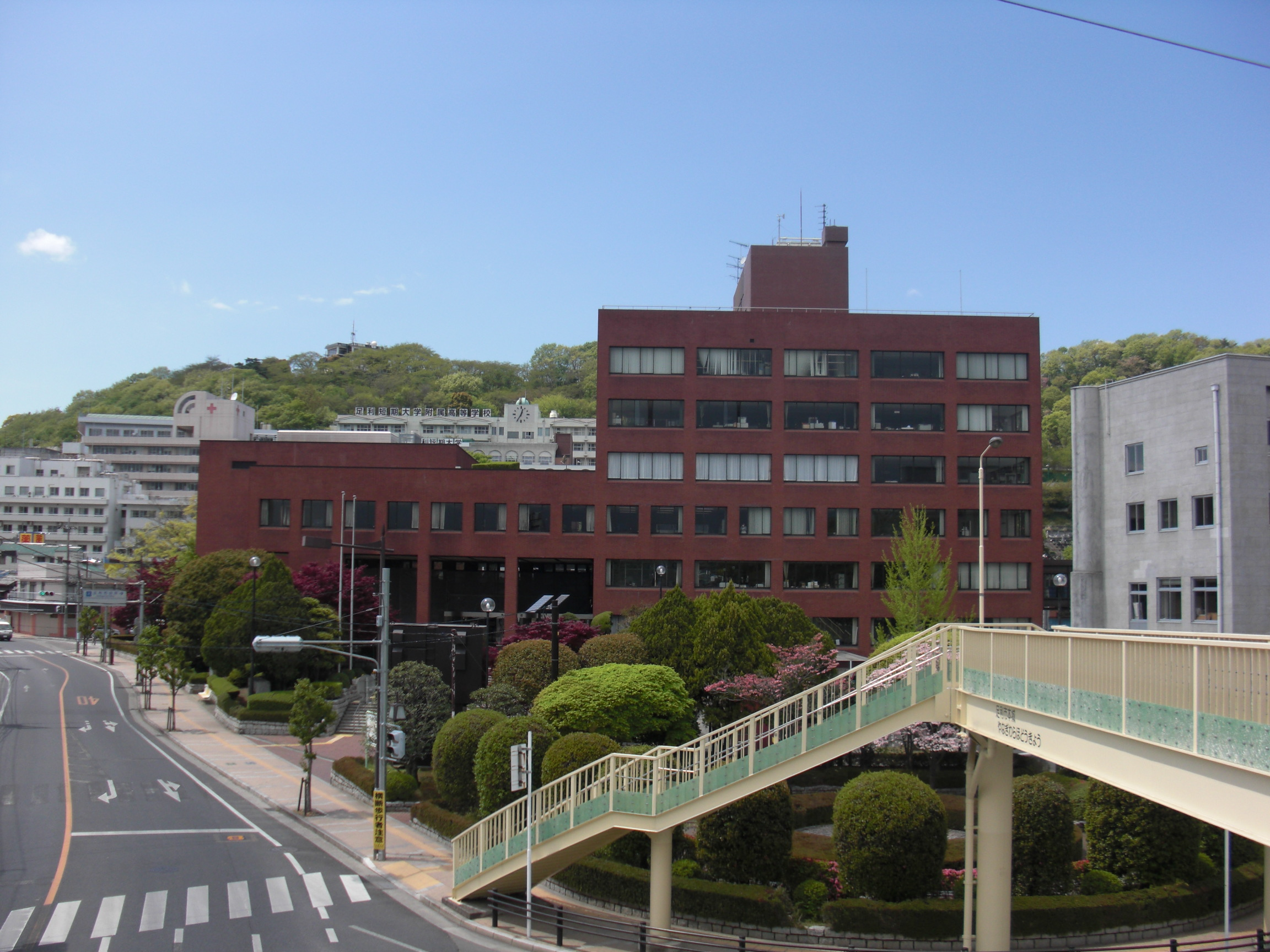
Ashikaga City Hall

Ashikaga (足利市, Ashikaga-shi; Japanese pronunciation: [ä̀.ɕi̥.kä́.ɡä́(.ɕì), -ŋä́(.ɕì), -ɡä̀, -ŋä̀]) is a city located in Tochigi Prefecture of Honshu, Japan. As of 1 June 2023, the city had an estimated population of 140,036, in 62,123 households and a population density of 788 persons per km^{2}. The total area of the city is 177.76 square kilometres (68.63 sq mi).

== Geography ==
Ashikaga is located in the northern Kanto plain in the far southwestern corner of Tochigi Prefecture, bordering on Gunma Prefecture to the north, west and south. The Watarase River flows through the center of the city. It is located approximately 80 km north of Tokyo.

== Surrounding municipalities ==
Gunma Prefecture

- Kiryū
- Ōra
- Ōta
- Tatebayashi

Tochigi Prefecture

- Sano

== Climate ==
Ashikaga has a humid subtropical climate (Köppen Cfa) characterized by warm summers. The average annual temperature in Ashikaga is 14.2 °C. The average annual rainfall is 1280 mm with September as the wettest month. The temperatures are highest on average in August, at around 26.4 °C, and lowest in January, at around 2.9 °C.

== Demographics ==
Per Japanese census data, the population of Ashikaga has declined over the past 30 years.

Historical population
Year	Pop.	±%
1960	146,209	—
1970	156,004	+6.7%
1980	165,756	+6.3%
1990	167,686	+1.2%
2000	163,140	−2.7%
2010	154,462	−5.3%
2020	144,746	−6.3%

== History ==
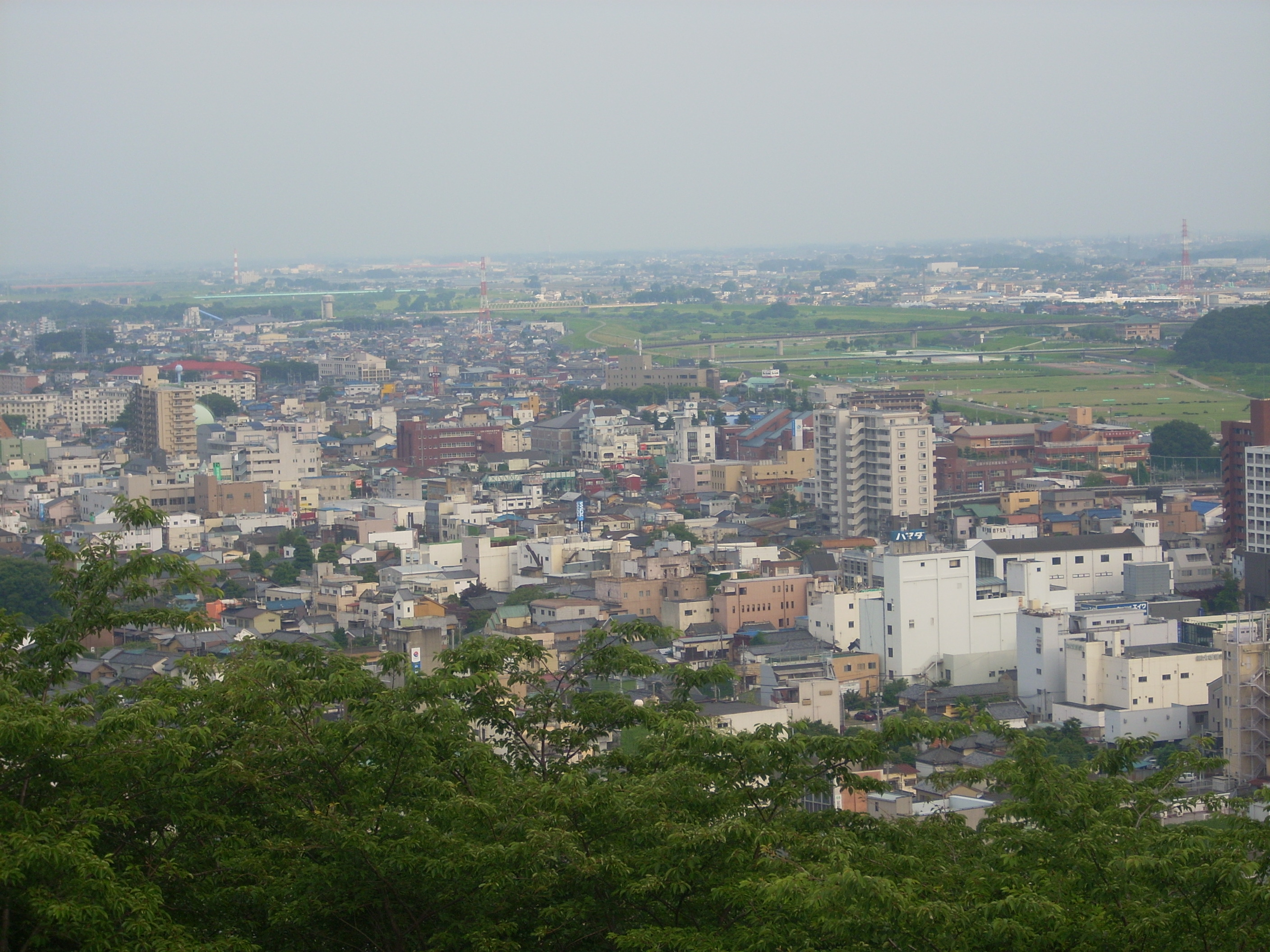
Ashikaga from a nearby Mountain

During the Heian Period, Ashikaga was developed by Minamoto no Yoshikuni, whose descendants later became the Ashikaga clan. The area was noted from this period for its academy, the Ashikaga Gakkō. During the Edo period, it was the center of Ashikaga Domain under the Tokugawa shogunate. Following the Meiji restoration, the town of Ashikaga within Ashikaga District, Tochigi was established with the creation of the modern municipalities system on April 1, 1889. It was elevated to city status on January 1, 1921. Ashikaga annexed the neighboring village of Keno on March 3, 1951, and the town of Yamabe on April 1, 1953. This was followed on August 1, 1954, by the villages of Mie and Yamamae, and on November 1, 1954, by the villages of Kitago and Nagusa. On April 1, 1959, Ashikaga annexed the village of Tomita, and the northern half of the village of Yabagawa on July 1, 1960. On October 1, 1962, Ashikaga annexed the towns of Mikuriya and Sakanishi. Ashikaga District was dissolved by this final merger.

== Government ==
Ashikaga has a mayor-council form of government with a directly elected mayor and a unicameral city legislature of 24 members. Ashikaga contributes four members to the Tochigi Prefectural Assembly. In terms of national politics, the city is part of Tochigi 5th district of the lower house of the Diet of Japan.

== Economy ==
Ashikaga has long been noted for its textile industry, but in recent years, it has also become known as an industrial and commercial city producing various aluminum, machine metal works and products. In the agricultural sector, Ashikaga is noted for its tomatoes.

== Education ==
- Ashikaga Institute of Technology
- Ashikaga Junior College
- Ashikaga has 22 public primary schools and 11 public middle schools operated by the city government and five public high schools operated by the Tochigi Prefectural Board of Education. There are also three private high schools and one private middle school. The prefecture also operates two special education schools for the handicapped.

== Transportation ==
=== Railway ===
JR East – Ryōmō Line

- Tomita - Ashikaga Flower Park - Ashikaga - Yamamae - Omata

Tōbu Railway – Tobu Isesaki Line

- Agata - Fukui - Tōbu-Izumi - Ashikagashi - Yashū-Yamabe

=== Highway ===
- Kita-Kantō Expressway – Ashikaga Interchange – Izuruhara Parking Area
- National Route 50
- National Route 293
- National Route 407

== Local attractions ==
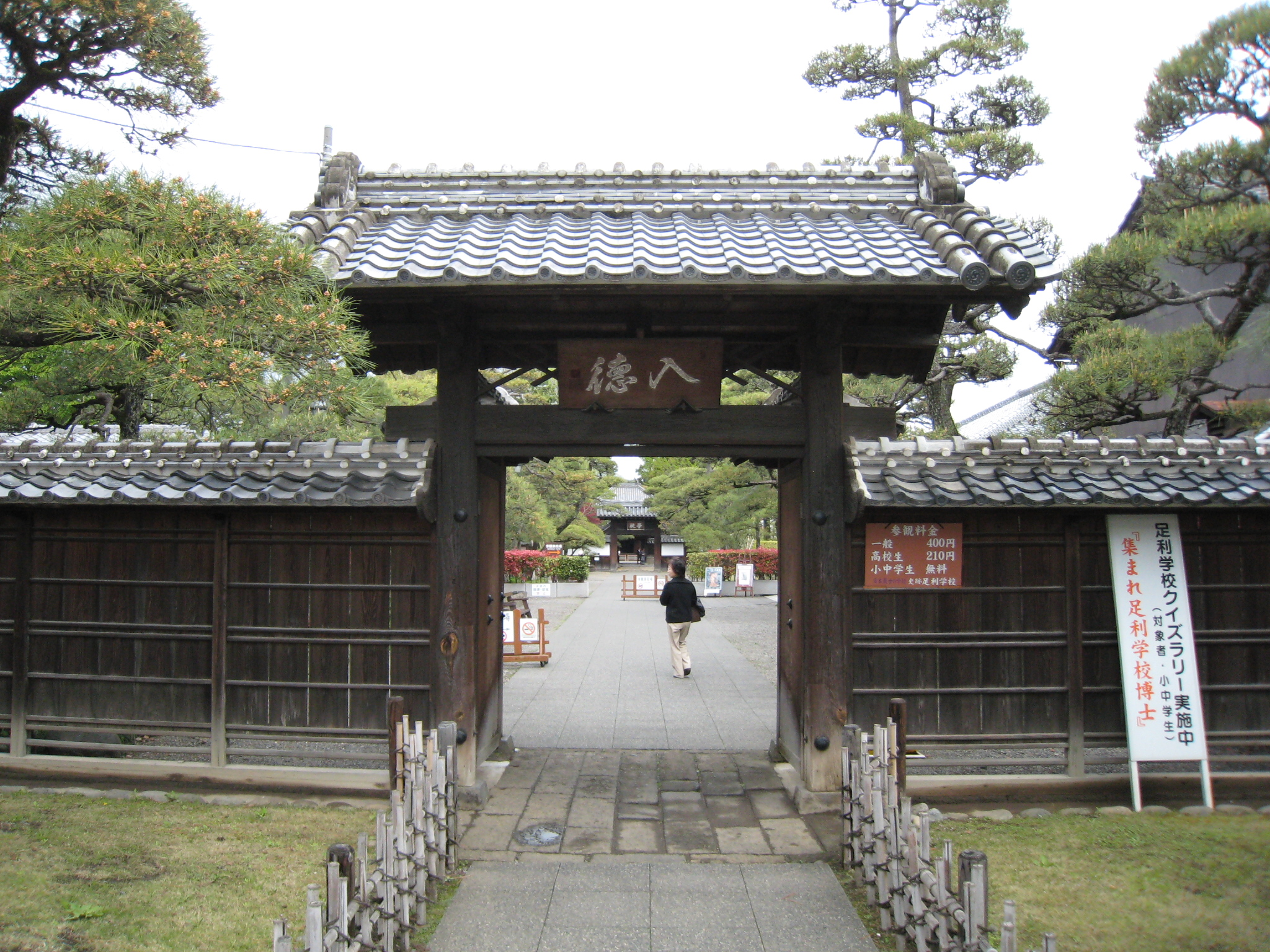
Ashikaga Gakko's main gate

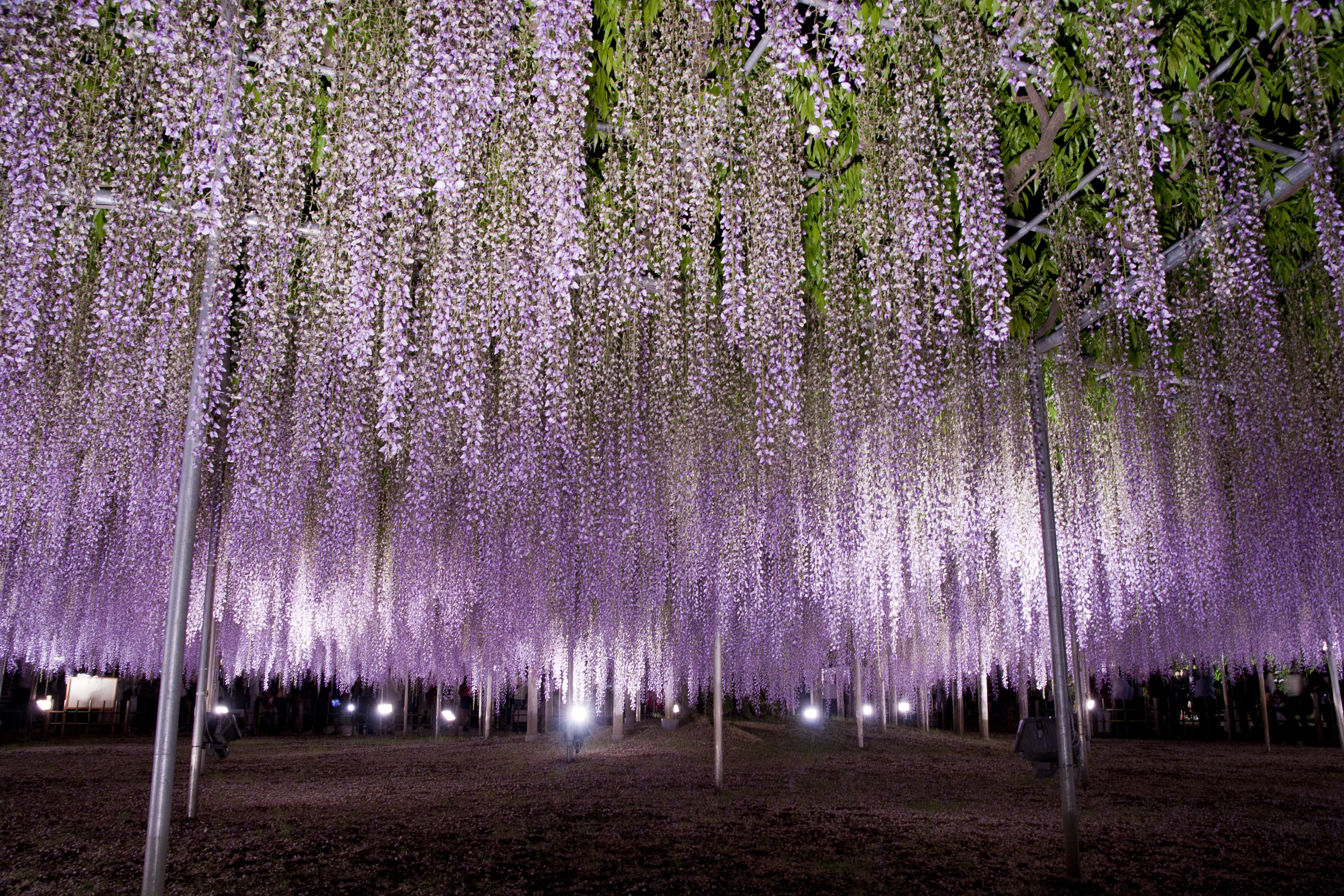
Japan's largest wisteria at Ashikaga Flower Park

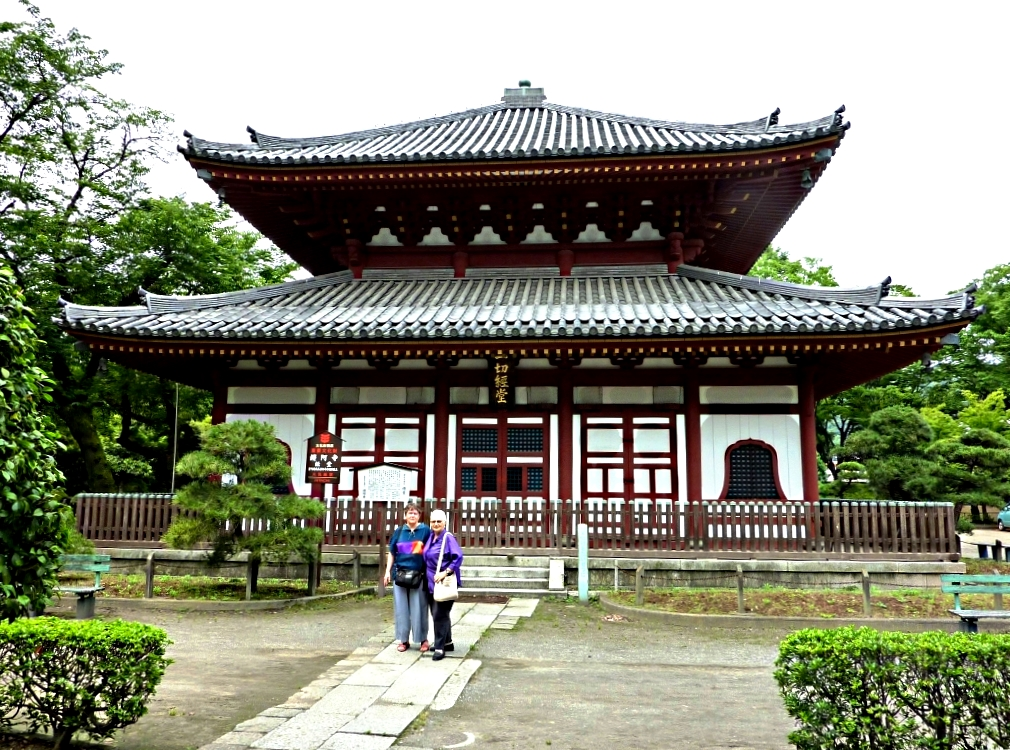
Ashikaga Banna-ji

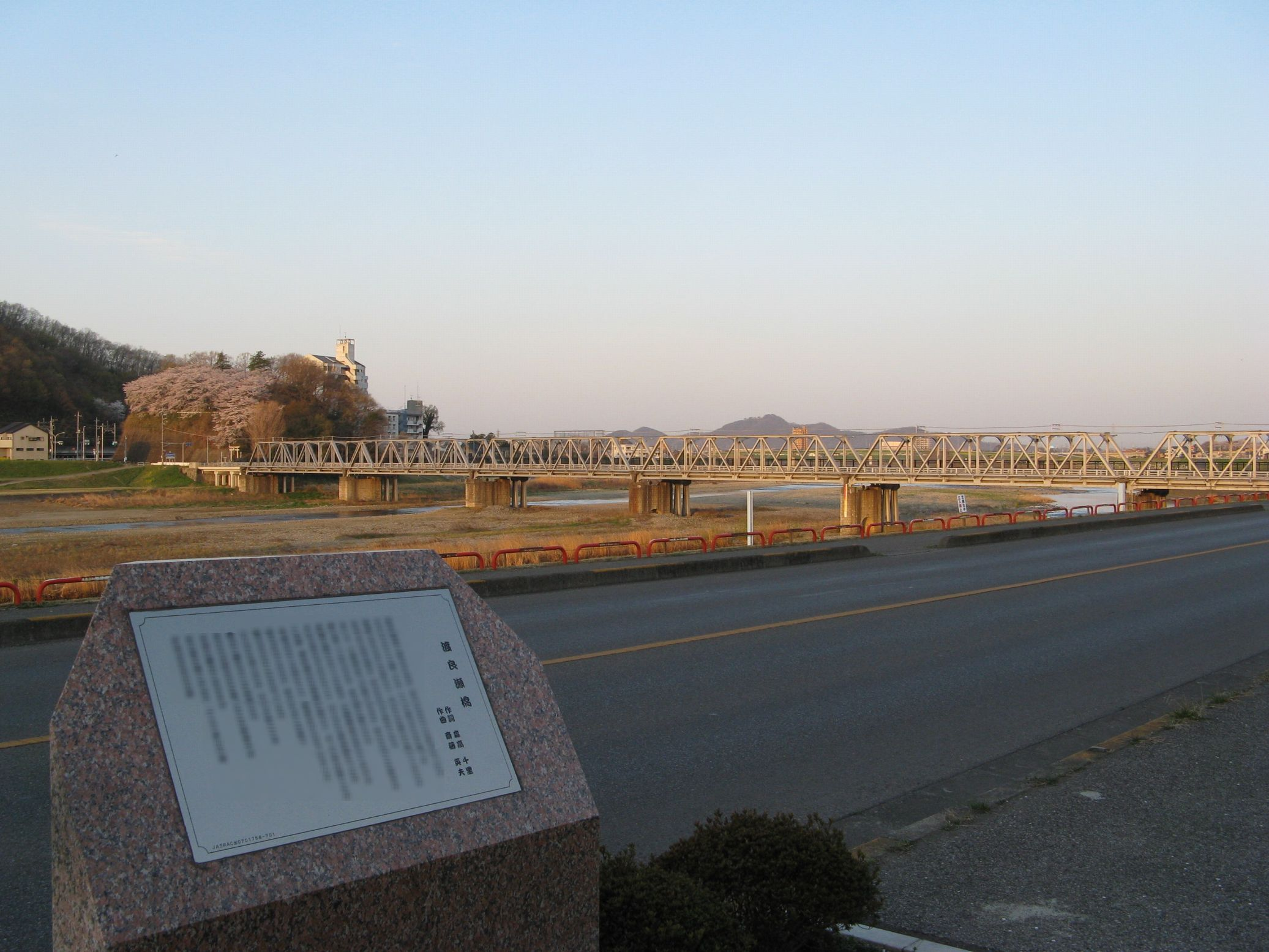
Watarasebashi Monument

- Ashikaga Gakkō (足利学校): referred to as the oldest school in Japan.
- Ashikaga Flower Park (足利フラワーパーク): Japan's oldest and largest wisteria.
- Banna-ji Temple (鑁阿寺): A temple known for its association with the Ashikaga clan.
- Coco Farm & Winery, located in the foothills on the outskirts of town. Founded around 1950, the vineyards are tended by adults with special needs and staff members living in community. During the third weekend of November, a harvest festival is held with live music and wine tasting. Thousands of visitors attend every year.
- Kurita Museum (栗田美術館): This museum has a fine collection of Imari and Nabeshima porcelains.
- Orihime Shrine (織姫神社): This shrine was built in 1879, the guardians of the textile city, Ashikaga.
- Watarasebashi Monument: A stele erected near Watarase Bridge in 2007 in honor of Chisato Moritaka's 1993 song "Watarasebashi". The stele features a speaker that plays the song.
- Watarase River Fireworks display, which takes places on the first Saturday of August attracts thousands of people from around the Kantō area.

== Sister cities ==
- Jining, Shandong, China
- Kamakura, Japan
- Springfield, Illinois, United States

== Notable people ==
- Atsushi Abe, voice actor
- Mitsuo Aida, poet and calligrapher
- George Akiyama, manga artist
- Yumiko Hara, marathon runner
- Chiaki Ishii, Japanese Brazilian judoka
- Toshimitsu Motegi, politician, member of parliament and Japanese government minister
- Noriyo Tateno, professional wrestler
- Masao Urino, songwriter, director

== See also ==
- Asteroid 9887 Ashikaga, named after the city
