= Yamamae Station =

Railway station in Ashikaga, Tochigi Prefecture, Japan

Yamamae Station 山前駅
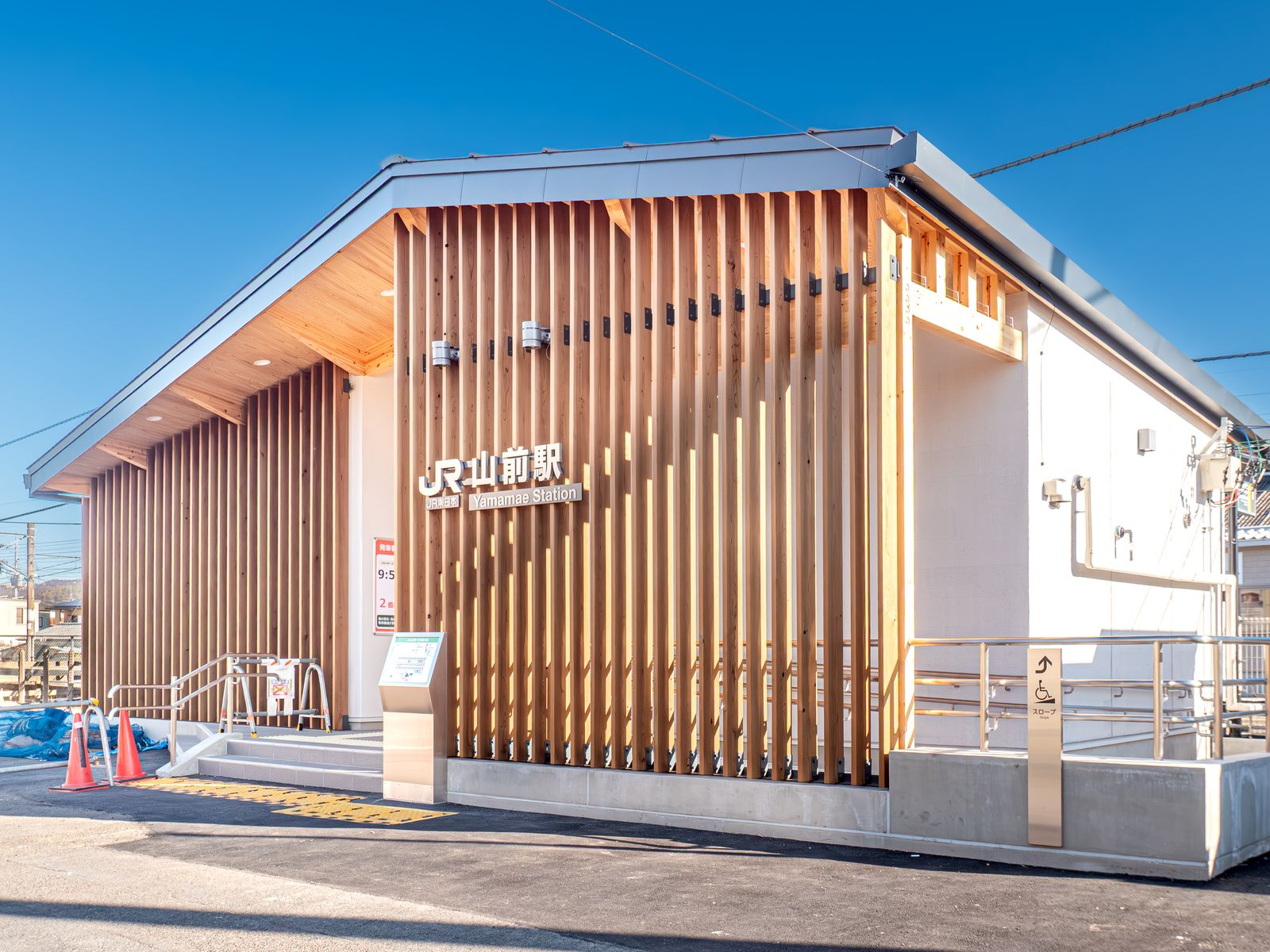
- Yamamae Station in March 2026

General information
- Location: Kashima-cho 2-chome, Ashikaga-shi, Tochigi-ken 326-0844; Japan
- Coordinates: 36.3471°N 139.4115°E
- Operator: JR East
- Line: Ryōmō Line
- Distance: 42.7 km (26.5 mi) from Oyama
- Platforms: 1 side + 1 island platform

Other information
- Status: Unstaffed
- Website: Official website

History
- Opened: 1 April 1897; 129 years ago

Passengers
- FY2017: 873 daily

Services
| Preceding station | JR East | Following station |
|---|---|---|
| Omata towards Takasaki | Ryōmō Line | Ashikaga towards Oyama |
Location
- Location within Tochigi Prefecture Location within Japan

Yamamae Station (山前駅, Yamamae-eki) a railway station in the city of Ashikaga, Tochigi, Japan, operated by the East Japan Railway Company (JR East).

== Lines ==
Yamamae Station is served by the Ryōmō Line, and is located 42.7 km (26.5 mi) from the starting point of the line at Oyama, and 49 km (30 mi) from Takasaki. The preceding station of Ashikaga is 4.5 km (2.8 mi) away and the following station of Omata is 4.6 km (2.9 mi) away.

== Station layout ==
Yamamae Station has a single side platform and a single island platform connected to the station building by a footbridge. The station is unnamed with a simple Suica ticket gate, a ticket vending machine and has no accessibility features.

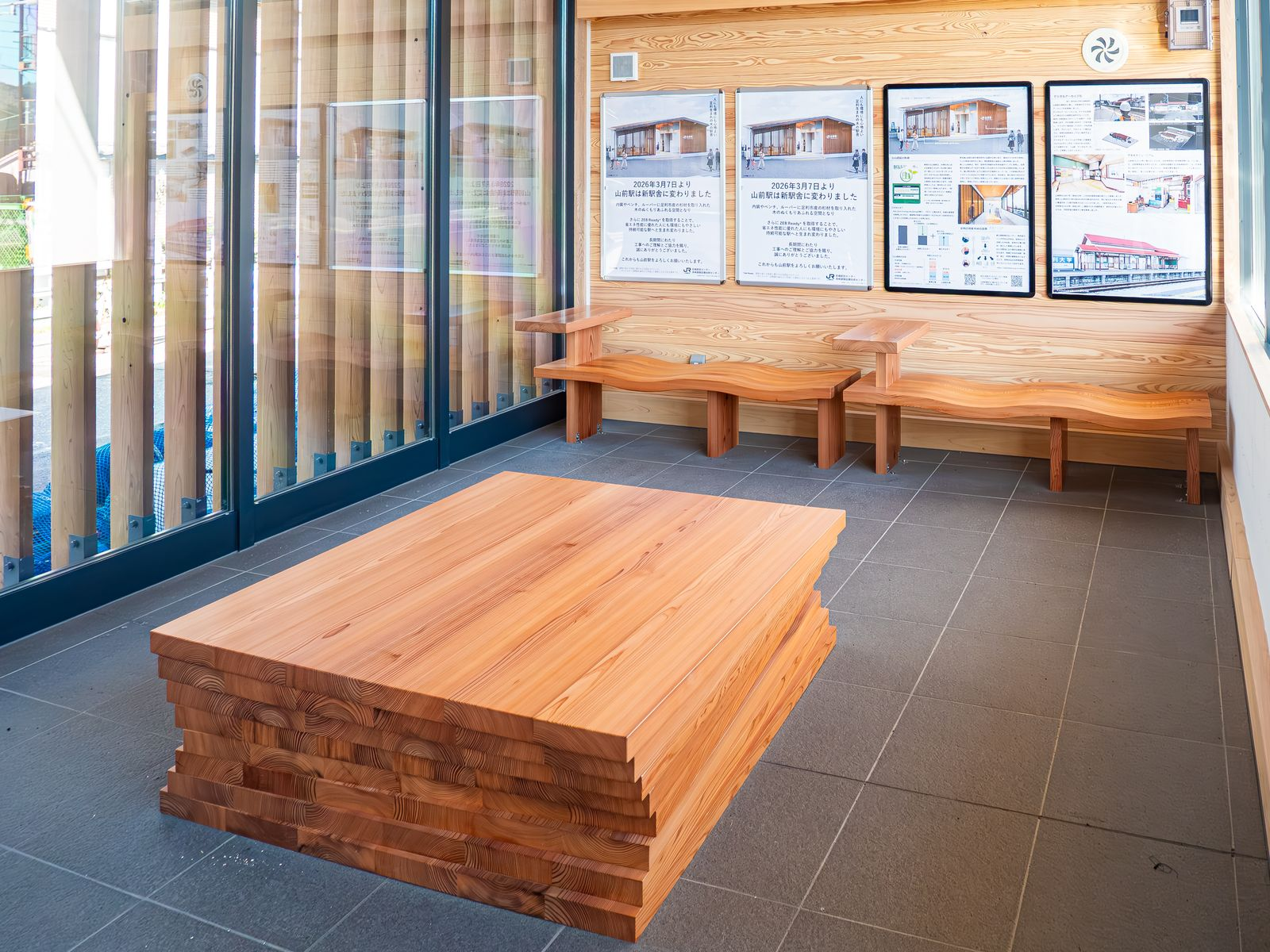
waiting room March 2026

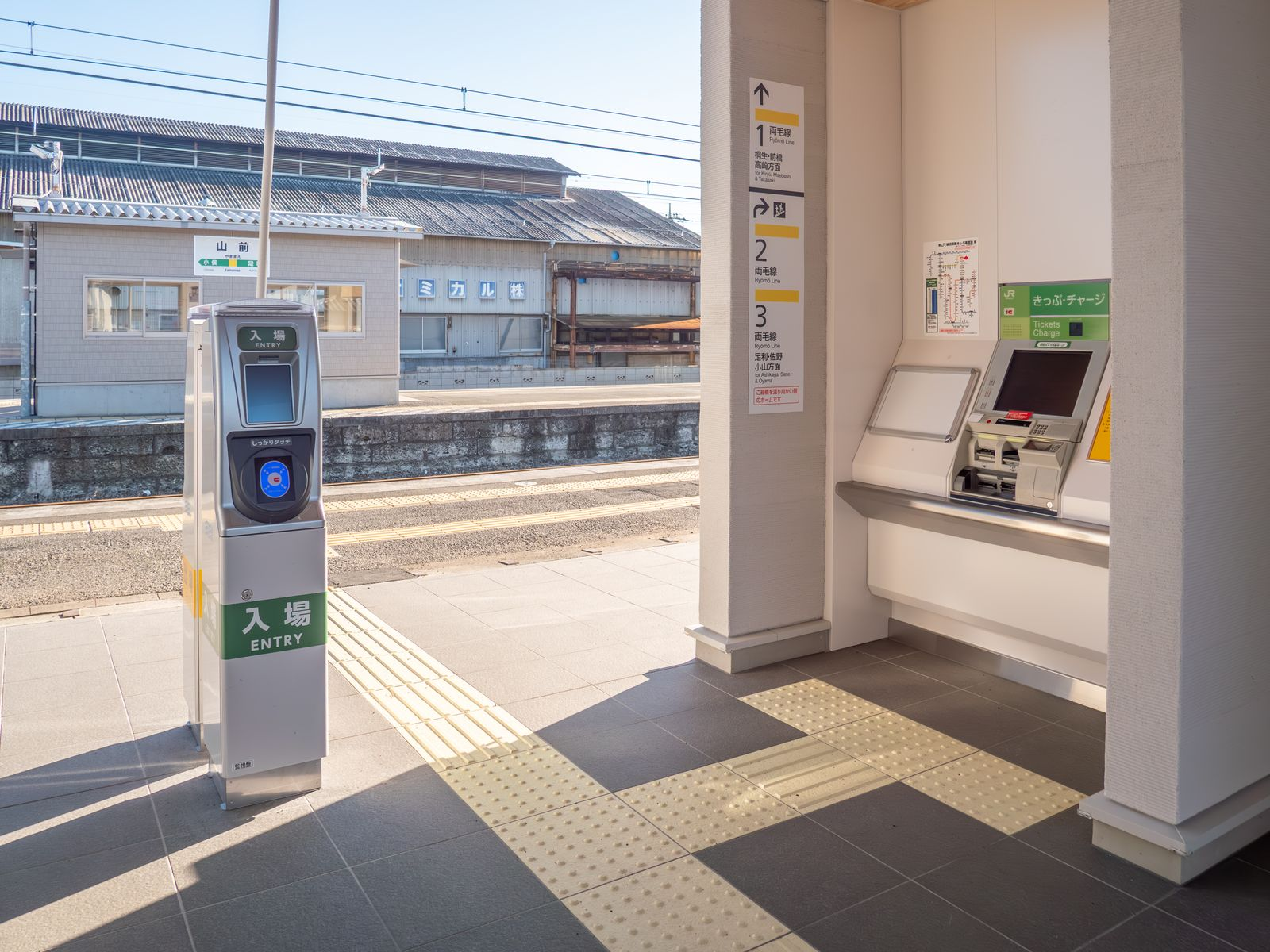
Ticket Gate March 2026

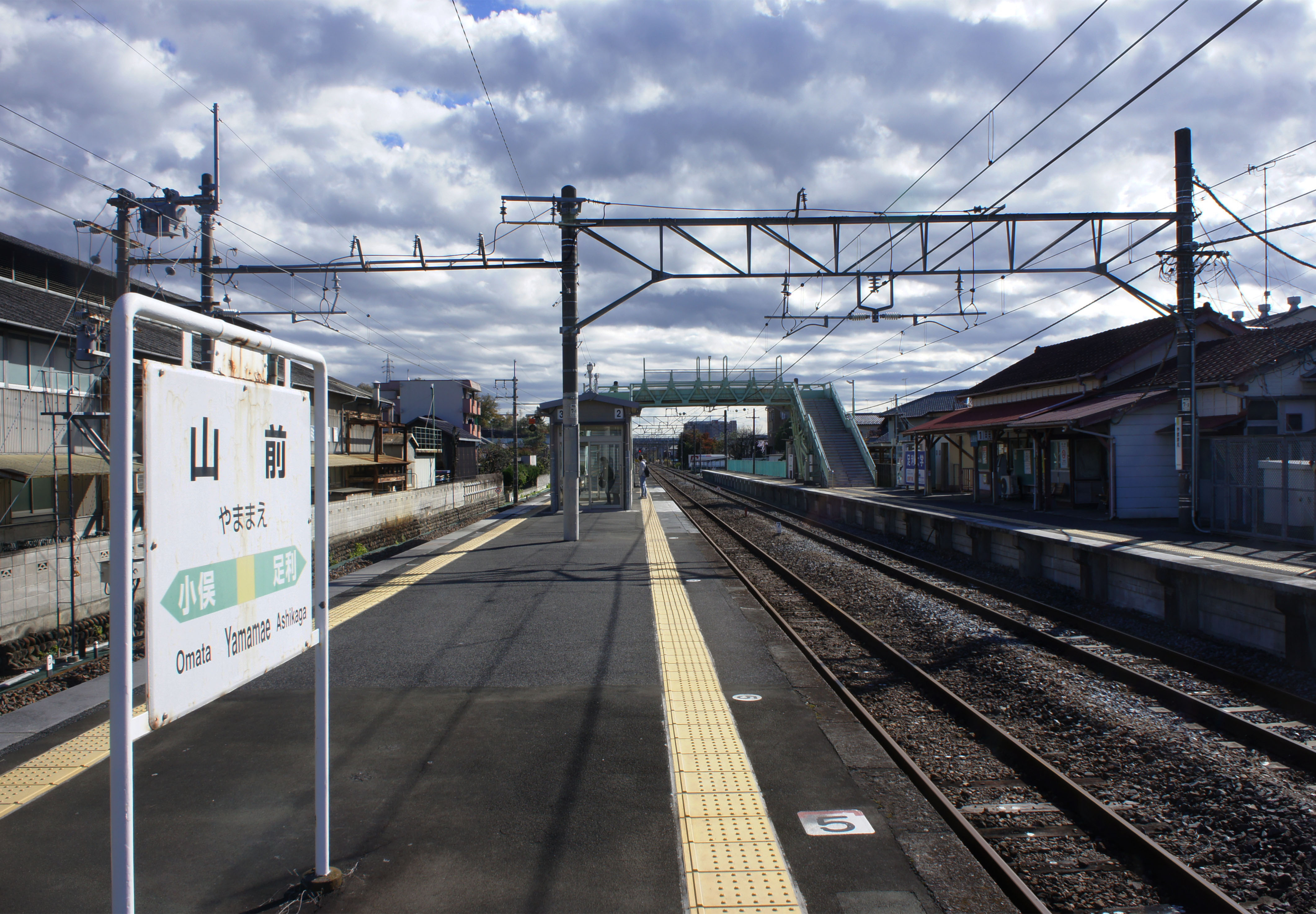
Platforms 2 & 3 November 2021

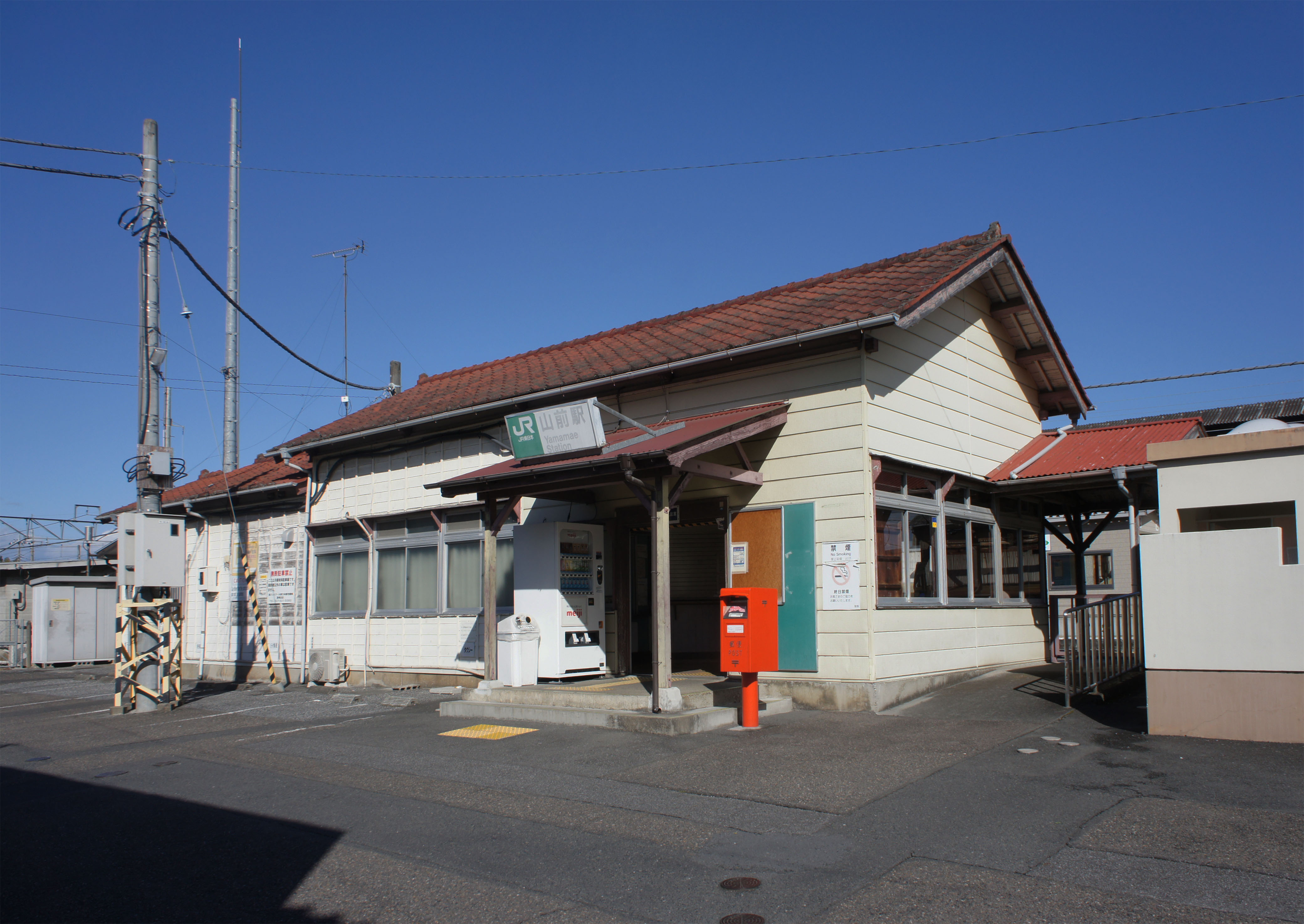
Old station building November 2021

=== Platforms ===
| 1 | ■ Ryōmō Line | for Kiryu, Maebashi, and Takasaki |
| 2; 3 | ■ Ryōmō Line | for Ashikaga, Tochigi, and Oyama |

== History ==
The station opened on 1 April 1897. With the privatization of JNR on 1 April 1987, the station came under the control of JR East.

The station started accepting Suica cards on November 18, 2001. On 1 March 2019, the station became unstaffed.

== Passenger statistics ==
In fiscal 2017, the station was used by an average of 873 passengers daily (boarding passengers only). Since 2018, JR East has not reported the passenger numbers for Yamamae Station.

Below is table containing the passenger statistics from the year 2000 to the year 2017:

Passenger statistics
| Year | Average Daily Boarding Passengers | Year | Average Daily Boarding Passengers |
|---|---|---|---|
| 2000 | 884 | 2010 | 775 |
| 2001 | 862 | 2011 | 784 |
| 2002 | 859 | 2012 | 826 |
| 2003 | 910 | 2013 | 864 |
| 2004 | 845 | 2014 | 859 |
| 2005 | 866 | 2015 | 860 |
| 2006 | 859 | 2016 | 872 |
| 2007 | 886 | 2017 | 873 |
| 2008 | 866 | | |
| 2009 | 826 | | |

== Surrounding area ==
- Ashikaga Fujimidai Hospital
- Kita-Kantō Expressway

== See also ==
- List of railway stations in Japan
