= Kurita Museum =

- 栗田美術館
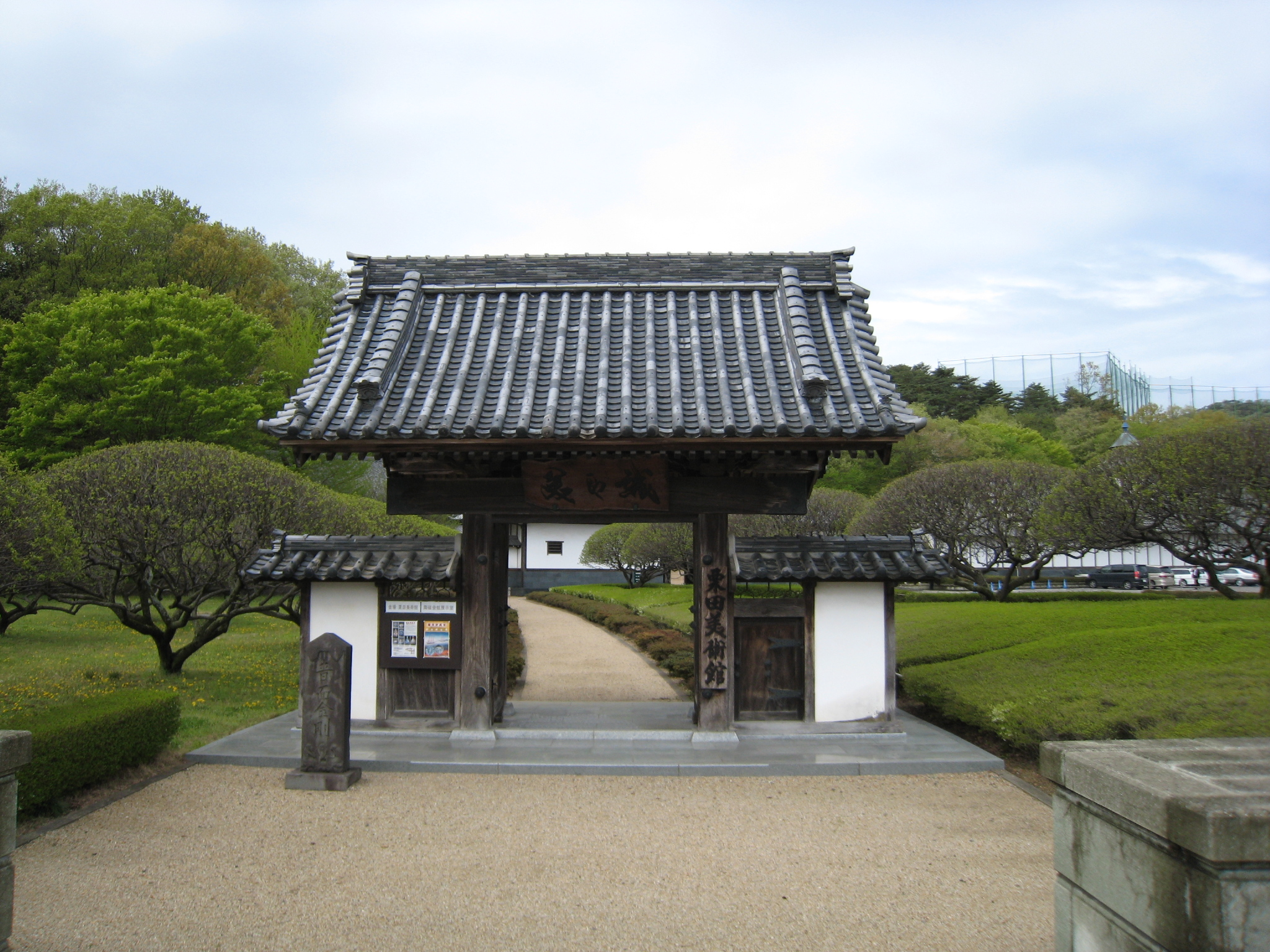
- Interactive map of the Kurita Museum area

General information
- Location: 1542 Komaba-chō, Ashikaga, Tochigi Prefecture, Japan
- Coordinates: 36°19′00″N 139°31′18″E
- Opened: 1975

Website
- Official website

Kurita Museum (栗田美術館, Kurita Bijutsukan) opened in Ashikaga, Tochigi Prefecture, Japan, in 1975. Specializing in Imari ware and Nabeshima ware, the collection includes the Important Cultural Property "Large Nabeshima Plate with Rock and Peony Design".

== See also ==
- List of museums in Tochigi prefecture
- Ashikaga Gakkō
- Banna-ji
