= Ashikaga Junior College =

Private junior college in Ashikaga, Tochigi, Japan

Coordinates: 36°20′25.4″N 139°26′50.7″E

- 足利短期大学
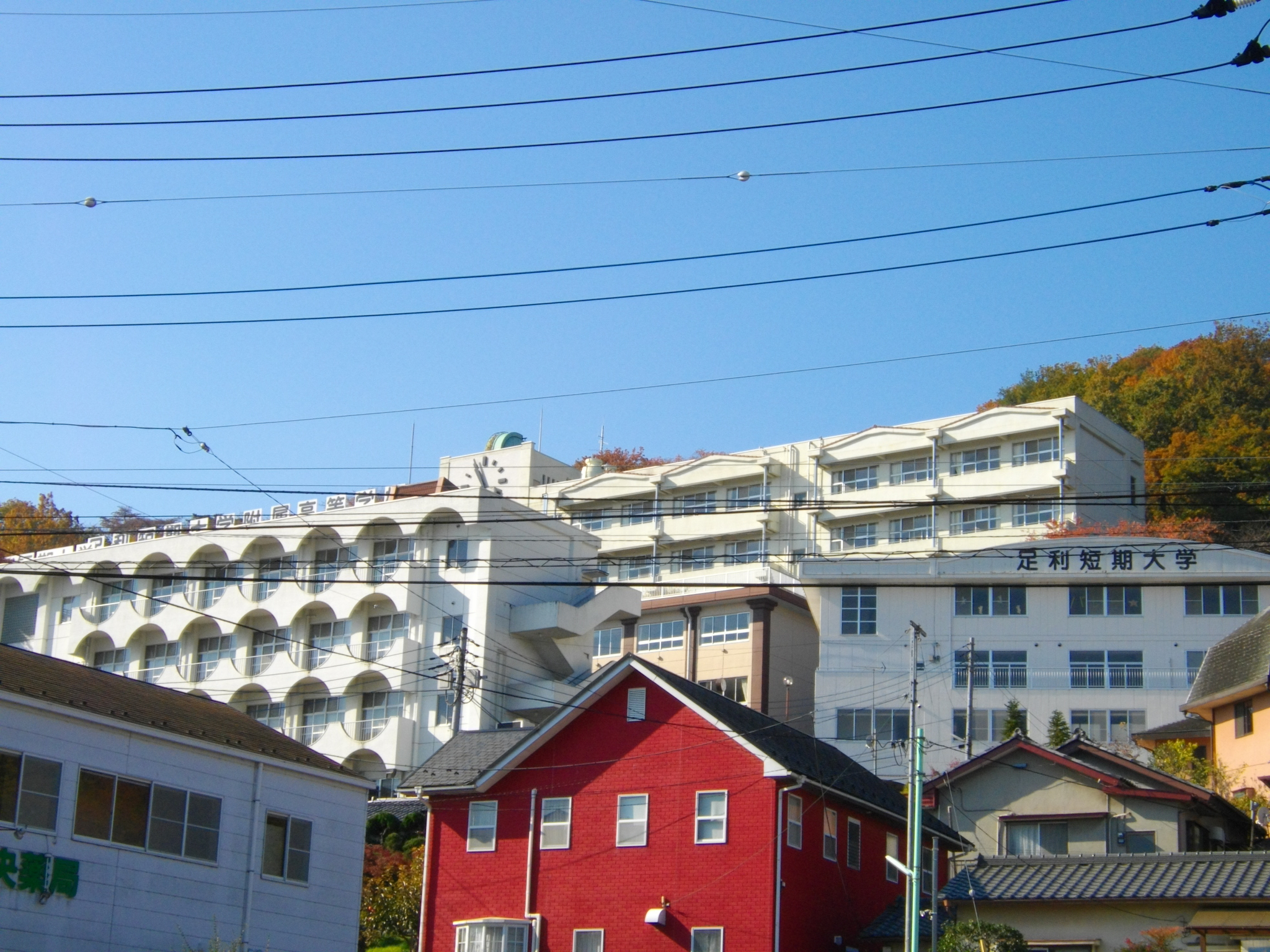
- Ashikaga Junior College
- Type: Private
- Established: 1979
- Location: Ashikaga, Tochigi, Japan
- Website: www.ashikaga.ac.jp

Ashikaga Junior College (足利短期大学, Ashikaga tanki daigaku) is a private junior college in Ashikaga, Tochigi, Japan, established in 1979. The predecessor of the college, a women's school, as established in 1925.
