= Banna-ji =

- 鑁阿寺
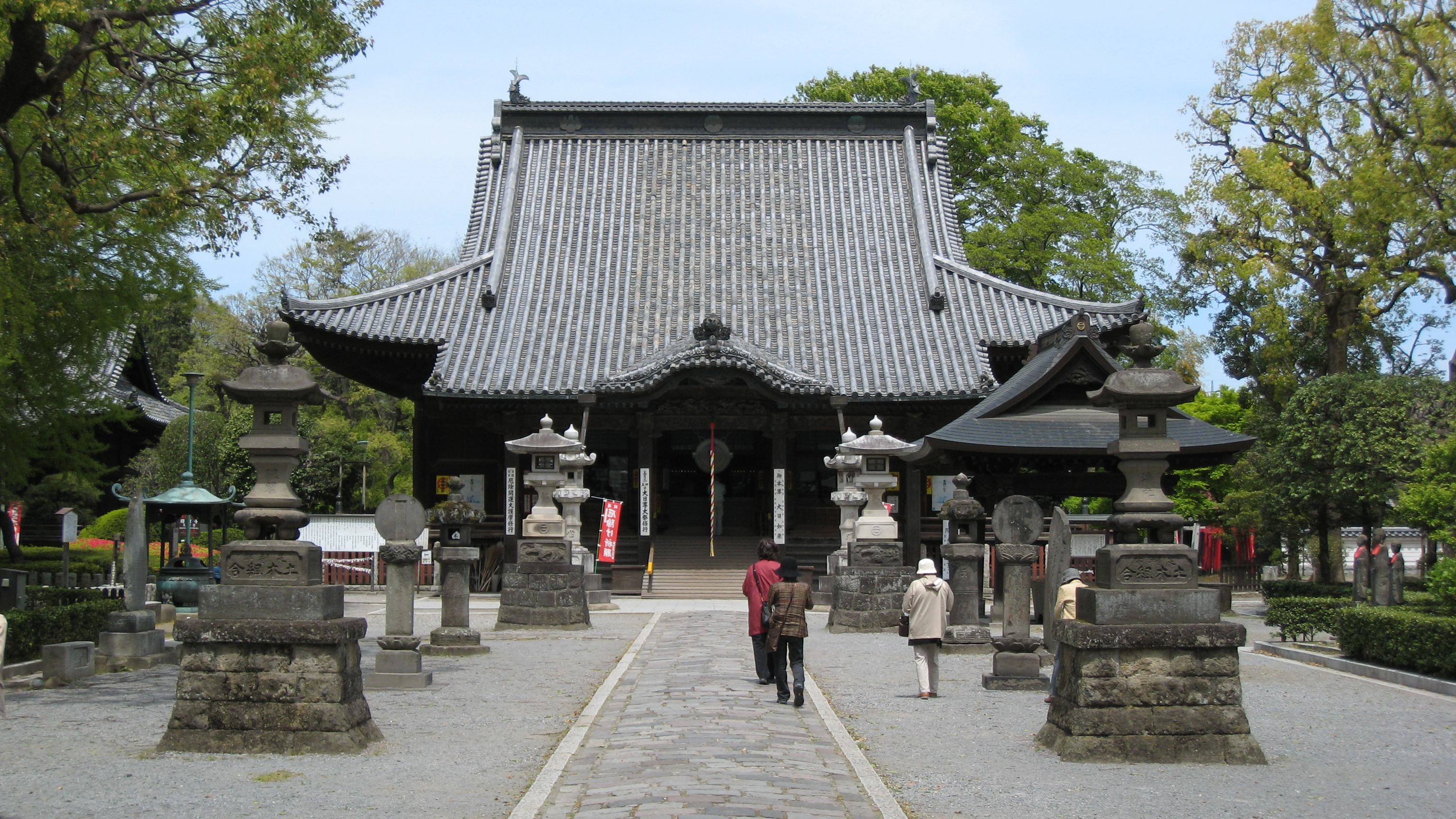
- Banna-ji Hondo (NT)

- Location within Tochigi Prefecture Location within Japan

Religion
- Affiliation: Buddhist
- Deity: Dainichi Nyōrai
- Rite: Shingon
- Status: functional

Location
- Location: 2220 Ietomichō, Ashikaga-shi, Tochigi-ken 326-0803
- Country: Japan
- Coordinates: 36°20′15.1″N 139°27′8.1″E

Architecture
- Founder: Ashikaga Yoshikane
- Completed: 1197

Website
- Official website

Banna-ji (鑁阿寺) is a Buddhist temple of the Shingon tradition in the city of Ashikaga, Tochigi Prefecture, in northern Kantō region of Japan. The honzon of the temple is a statue of Dainichi Nyōrai, leading to the temple's nickname of Dainichisama. The temple is built on the ruins of the ancestral fortified residence of the Ashikaga clan who ruled Japan during the Muromachi shogunate, and its grounds are a National Historic Site

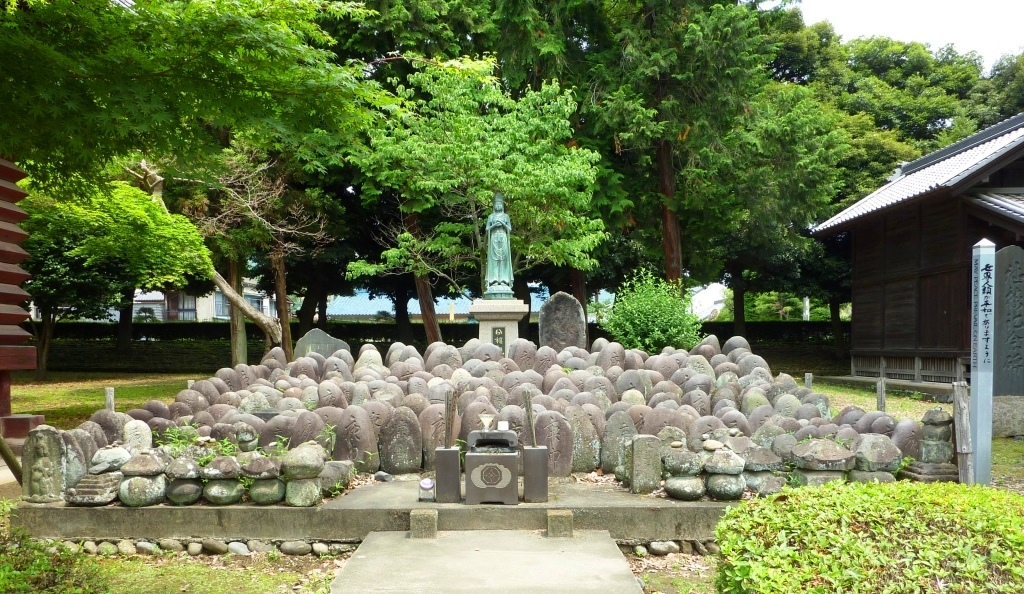
Buddha statue with votive offerings. Banna-ji

== History ==
Minamoto no Yoshiyasu was awarded a shōen (estate) in this area of Shimotsuke Province in the middle of the 12th century, and constructed a fortified residence. His third son took the name of "Ashikaga" from the place where this estate was located, and became Ashikaga Yoshikane. He served as a vassal of Minamoto no Yoritomo in the Genpei War and eventually became Yoritomo's brother-in-law. He was awarded with the governorship of Shimotsuke Province in 1185. Ten years later, in 1195, he retired, becoming a Buddhist monk and taking the name Gishō (義称). The following year he installed a statue of Dainichi Nyōrai in his residence, transforming it into a Buddhist temple named Banna-ji. This temple was greatly expanded by his third son, Ashikaga Yoshiuji, in 1234. Yoshiuji is also responsible for building the current Hondō of the temple. The temple was a subsidiary of Tsurugaoka Hachiman-gu in Kamakura for the remainder of the Kamakura period and Nanboku-cho period. However, by the Sengoku period, the power and influence of the Ashikaga clan had waned considerably, and the temple declined into near ruin.

== Present situation ==
The 40,000 square meter precincts of the temple gained protection as a National Historic Site in March 1922, and the main hall was designated as an Important Cultural Property of Japan in 1950. The temple still retains many remnants of its origins as a fortified samurai residence, including moats and earthen ramparts, along with four fortified gates, which date to the 1500s. These features led the temple to be included as one of Japan's Top 100 Castles in 2006 by the Japan Castle Foundation. The status of the main hall was raised to that of a National Treasure in 2013.

== Cultural Properties ==
=== Banna-ji Hondō (National Treasure) ===
The main hall of Banna-ji was originally constructed in 1234 by Ashikaga Yoshiuji. This structure burned down after being struck by lightning, and was rebuilt in 1299 by Ashikaga Sadauji, the father of the famous Ashikaga Takauji, founder of the Muromachi shogunate. It is a 5 x 5 bay hall with a irimoya style roof. Although the temple itself is an esoteric Buddhist temple, many of the architectural features of this building are based on the styles of Japanese Zen. The building was extensively remodeled around 1407 to 1432. It was designated an Important Cultural Property in 1908, and upgraded to a National Treasure in 2013.

=== Important Cultural Properties ===
- Kyōdō, early Edo period,
- Bonshō, Kamakura period,

== Gallery ==
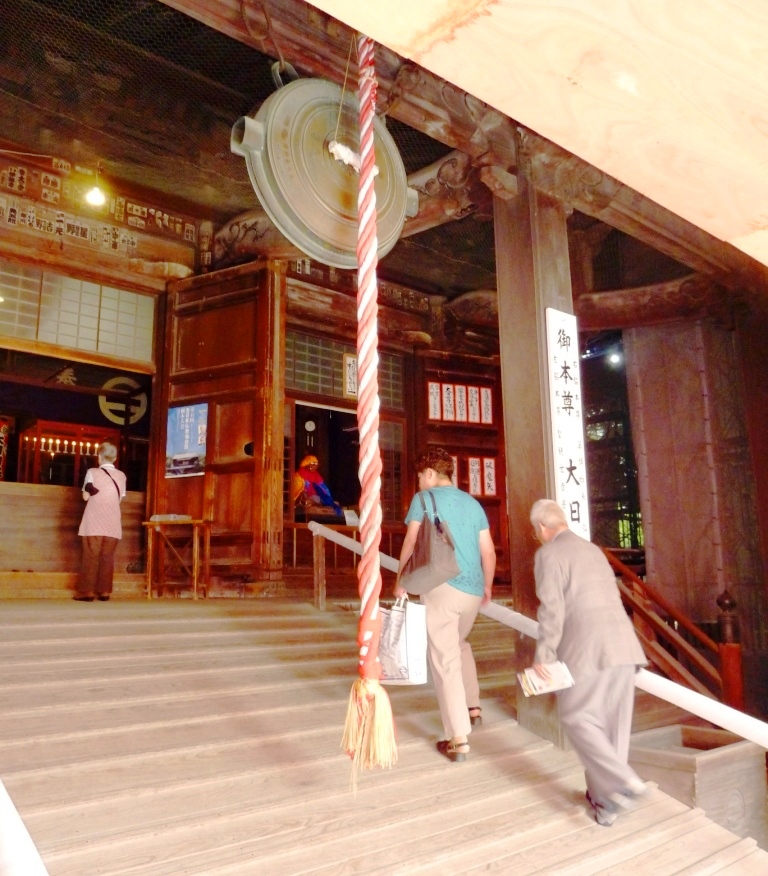
Large gong at Ashikaga Banna-ji

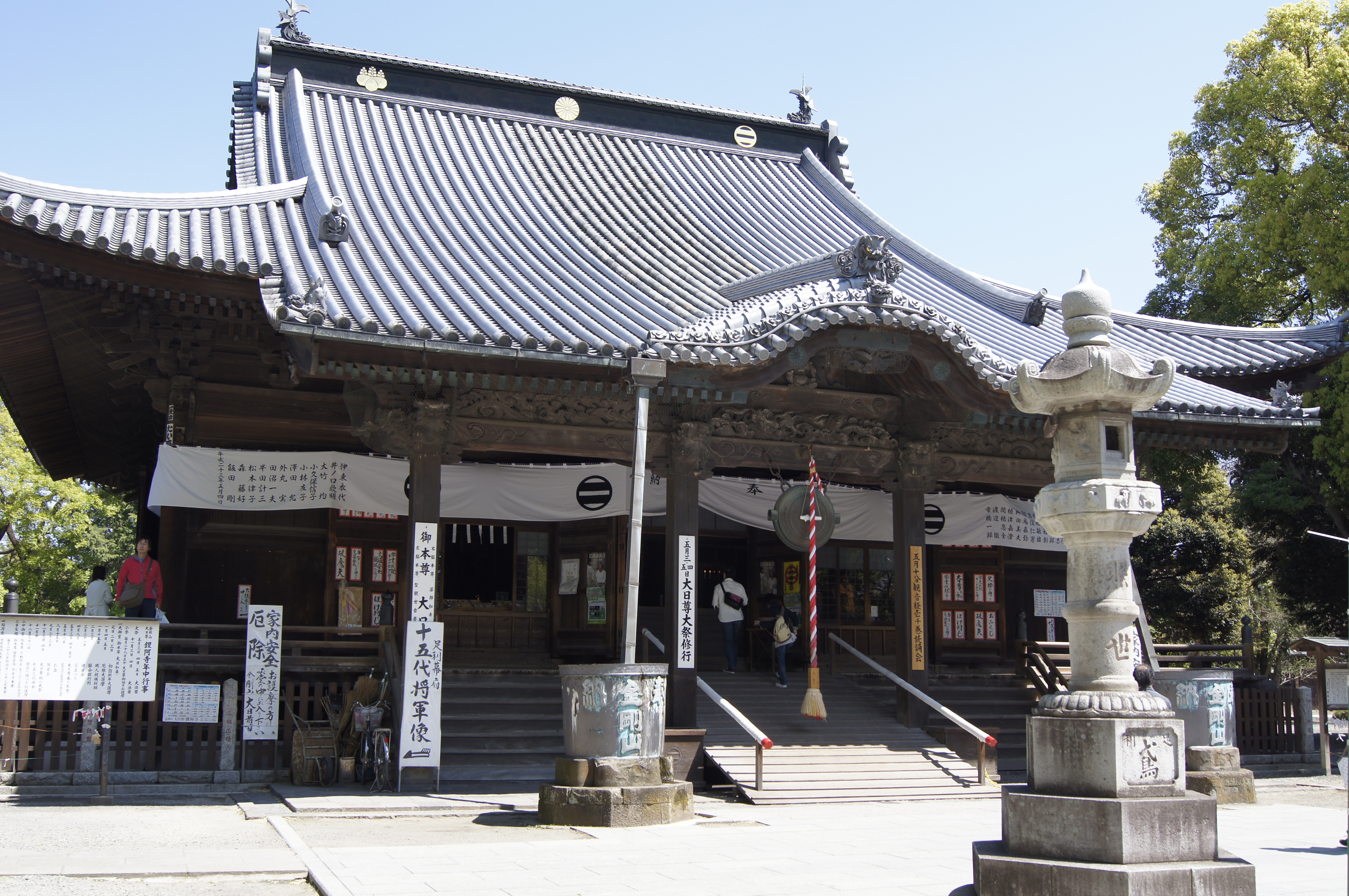
Hondō

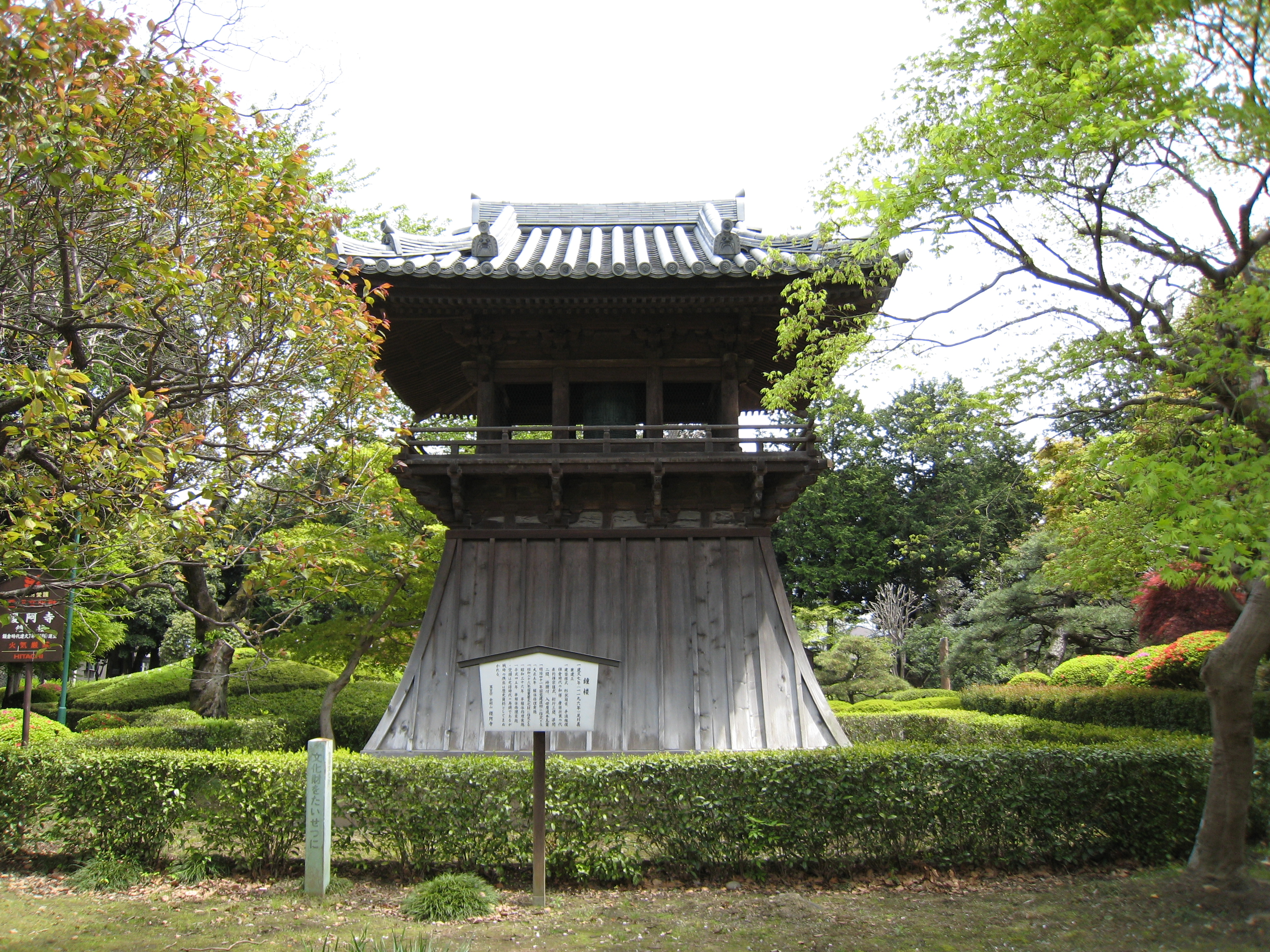
Shōrō containing bonshō

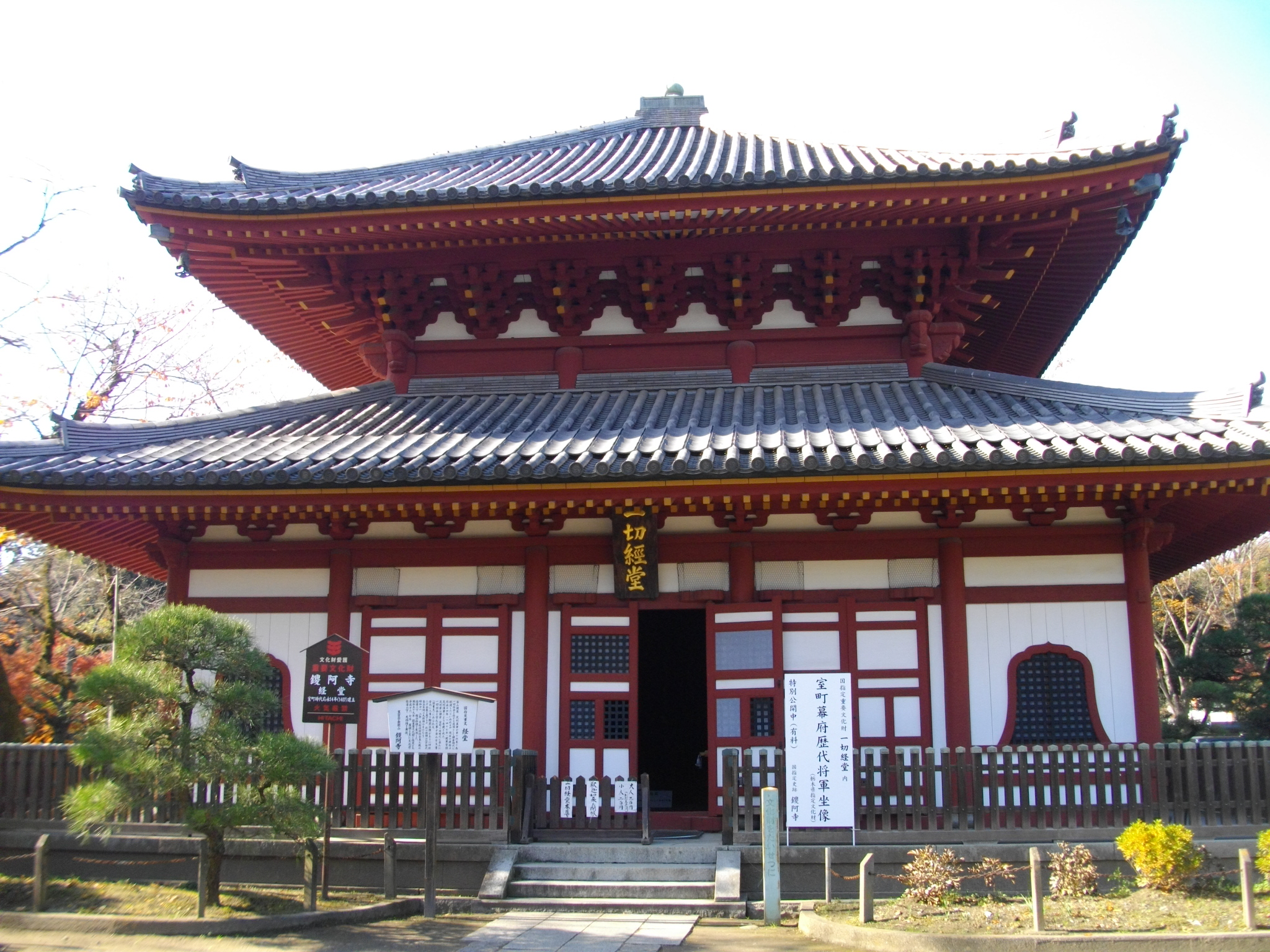
Kyōdō

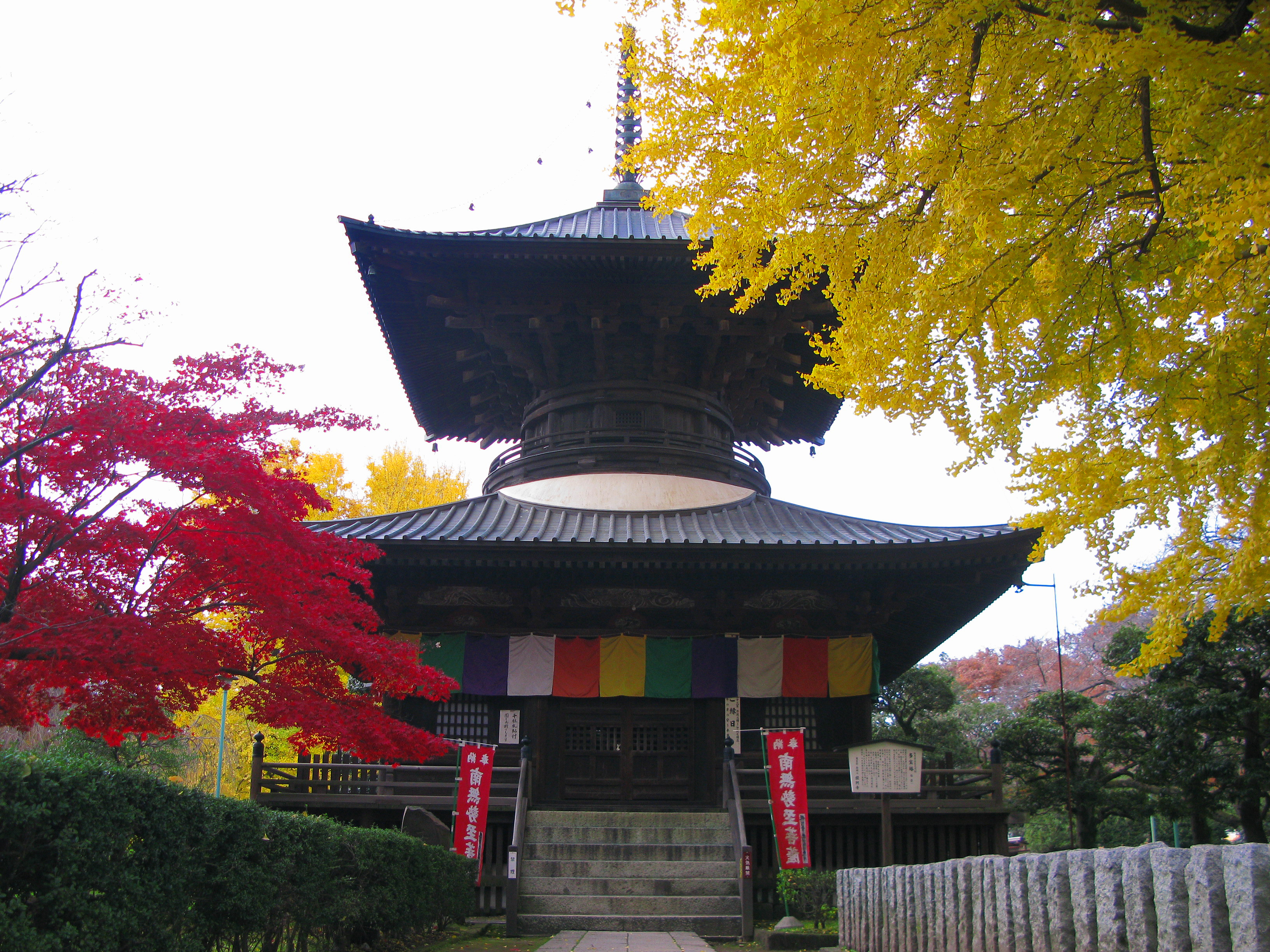
Tahōtō Pagoda

== See also ==
- List of Historic Sites of Japan (Tochigi)
