= Ashikaga Station =

Railway station in Ashikaga, Tochigi Prefecture, Japan

Ashikaga Station 足利駅
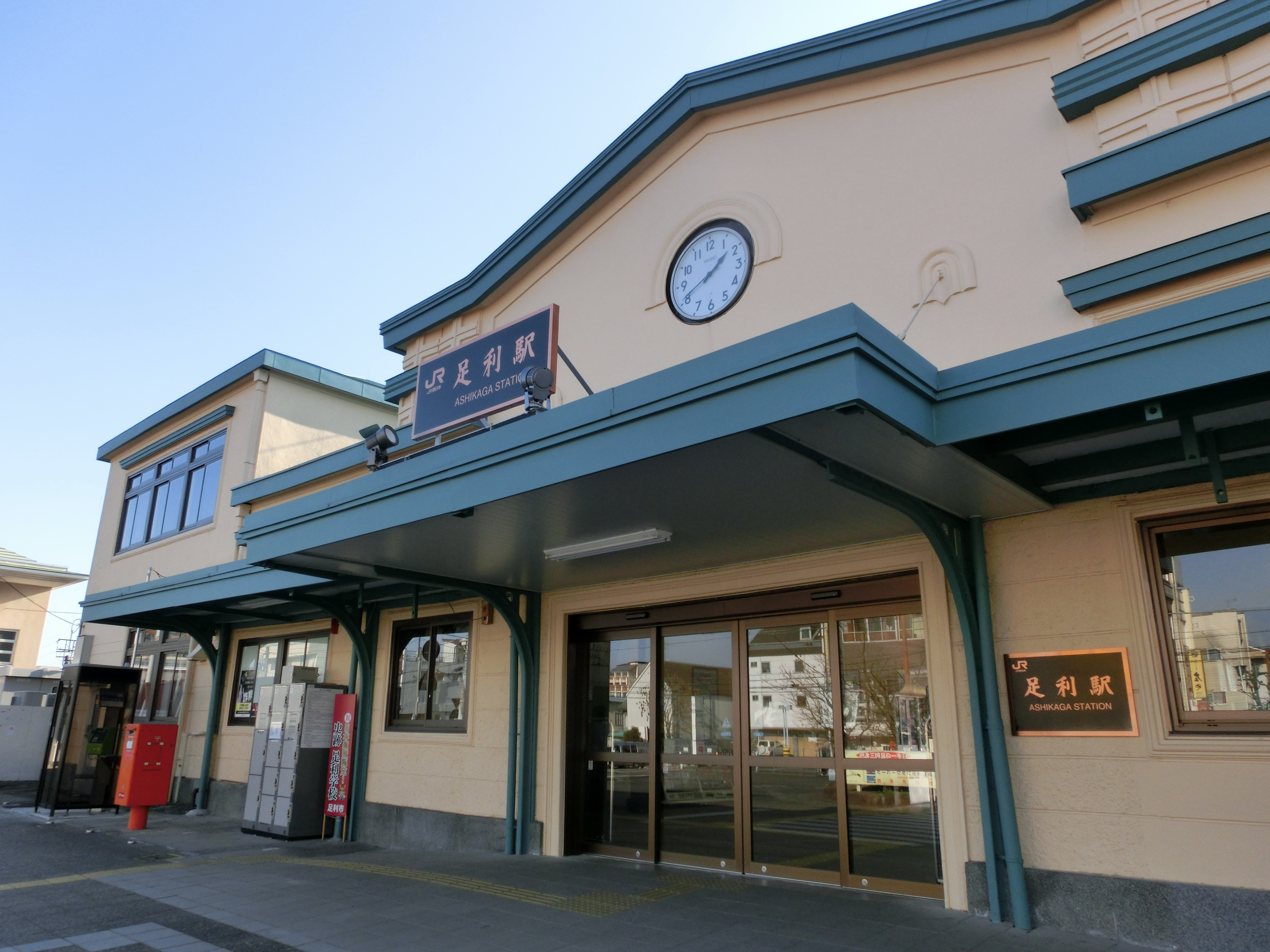
- Ashikaga Station north entrance in December 2015

General information
- Location: Ise-cho 118, Ashikaga-shi, Tochigi-ken 326-0053; Japan
- Coordinates: 36.3325°N 139.4557°E
- Operator: JR East
- Line: Ryōmō Line
- Distance: 38.2 km (23.7 mi) from Oyama
- Platforms: 2 side platforms
- Tracks: 2

Other information
- Status: Staffed
- Website: Official website

History
- Opened: 22 May 1888; 138 years ago

Passengers
- FY2021: 2,615

Services
Preceding station	JR East	Following station
Yamamae towards Takasaki	Ryōmō Line	Ashikaga Flower Park towards Oyama
Location
- Location within Tochigi Prefecture Location within Japan

Ashikaga Station (足利駅, Ashikaga eki) is a railway station in the city of Ashikaga, Tochigi Prefecture, Japan, operated by the East Japan Railway Company (JR East). It is one of two main railway stations of Ashikaga; the other is Ashikagashi Station of the private railway operator Tobu.

== Lines ==
Ashikaga Station is served by the Ryōmō Line, and is located 38.2 km (23.7 mi) from the starting point of the line at Oyama, and 53.5 km (33.2 mi) from Takasaki. The preceding station of Ashikaga Flower Park is 6.2 km (3.9 mi) away and the following station of Yamamae is 4.5 km (2.8 mi) away.

== Station layout ==
Ashikaga Station has two opposed side platforms connected to the station building by a footbridge. The station has many accessibility features such as elevators, Mobility scooter access, wheelchair-accessible bathroom, and a Braille Fare table.

=== Platforms ===
1	■ Ryōmō Line	for Sano, Tochigi and Oyama
2	■ Ryōmō Line	for Kiryu, Isesaki, Maebashi, and Takasaki

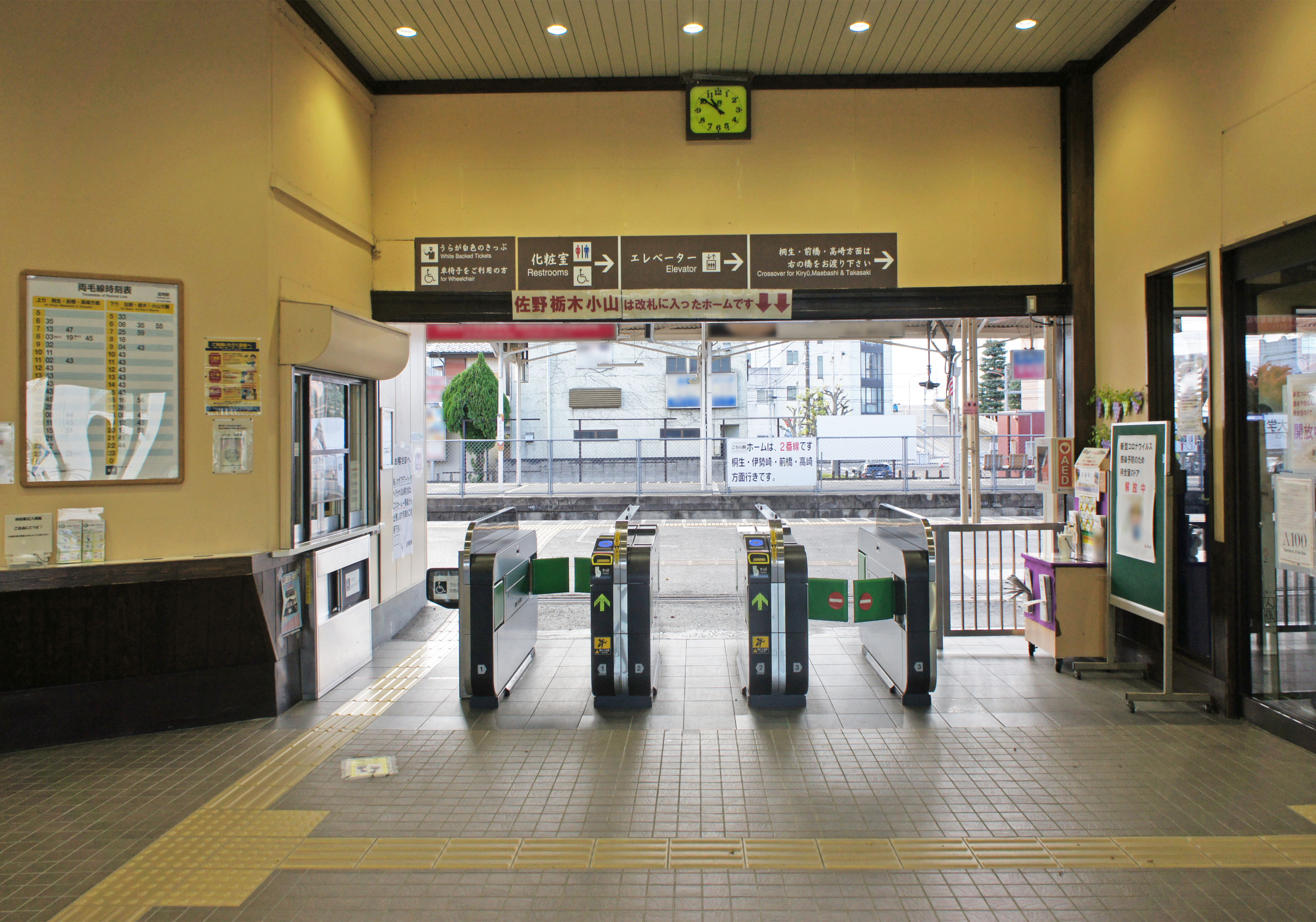
North Ticket Gates November 2021

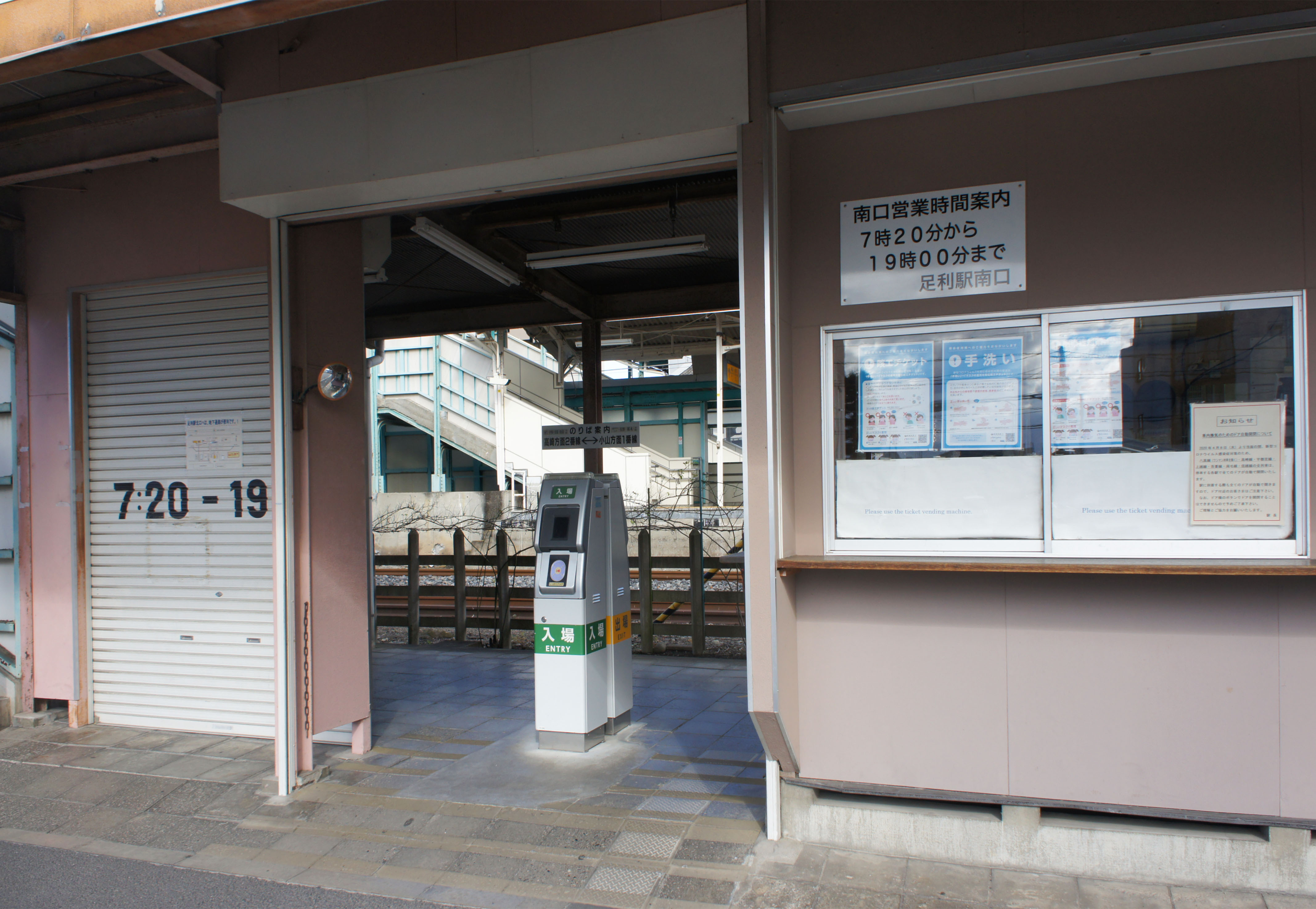
South Ticket Gate November 2021

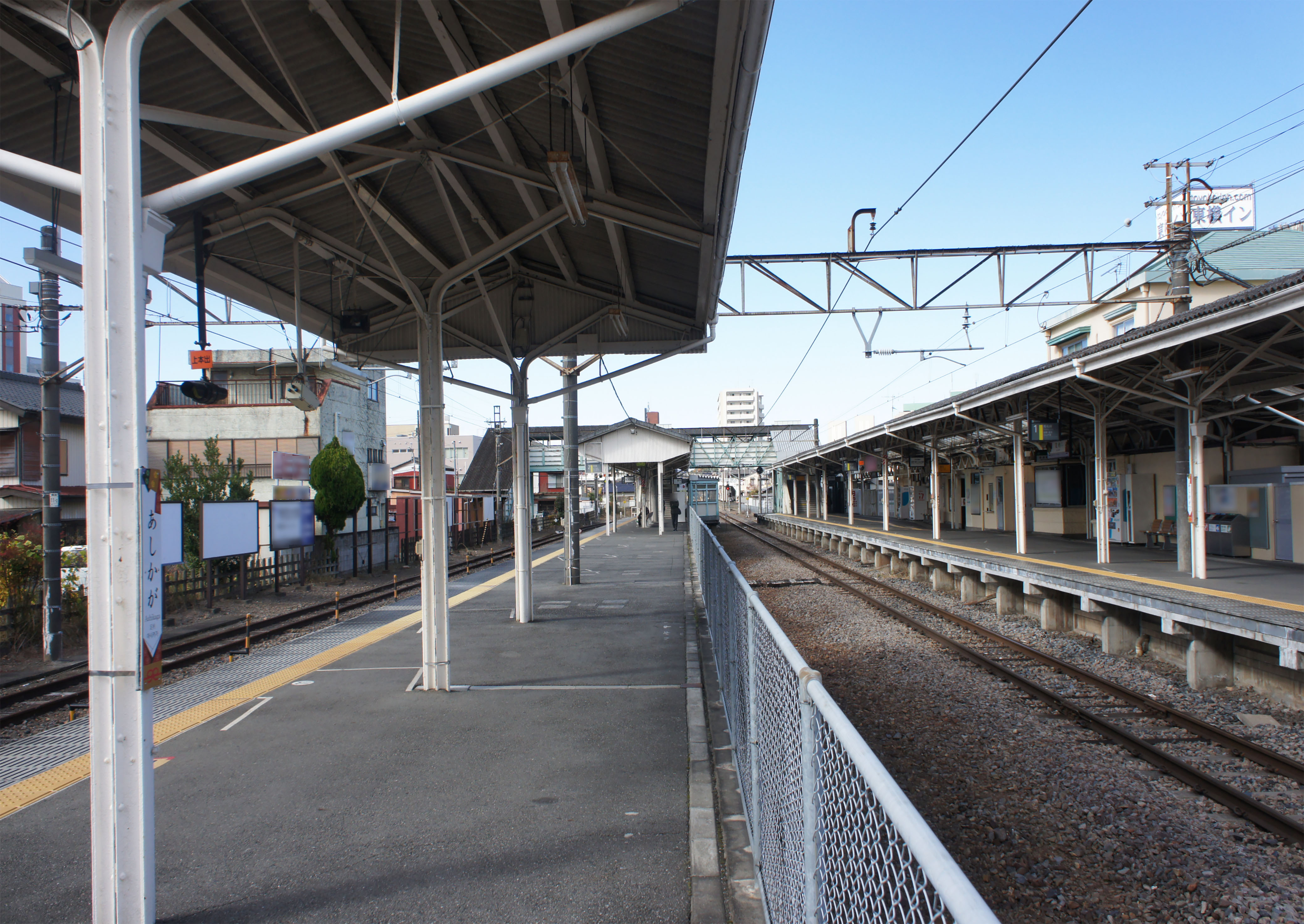
Platforms November 2021

== History ==
Ashikaga Station opened on 22 May 1888, as a station operated by the Ryomo Railway. With the privatization of Japanese National Railways (JNR) on 1 April 1987, the station came under the control of JR East.

The station started accepting Suica cards on November 18, 2001. On 25 July 2008, the station building was struck by lightning, which caused damage to the second floor. In July 2015, the station and Ashikagashi Station adopted Chisato Moritaka's 1993 song "Watarasebashi" as their train melody, as the song pays homage to the town of Ashikaga. In February 2021, the pillar-mounted station name sign and the hanging station name sign where replaced with textile pattern designed signs to pay homage to the Ryōmō Line.

== Passenger statistics ==
In fiscal 2021, the station was used by an average of 2,615 passengers daily (boarding passengers only).

Below is table containing the passenger statistics since the year 2000:

Passenger statistics
Year	Average Daily Boarding Passengers	Year	Average Daily Boarding Passengers	Year	Average Daily Boarding Passengers
2000	4,189	2010	3,318	2020	2,326
2001	4,045	2011	3,305	2021	2,615
2002	3,852	2012	3,373		
2003	3,773	2013	3,471		
2004	3,586	2014	3,366		
2005	3,502	2015	3,386		
2006	3,417	2016	3,345		
2007	3,310	2017	3,318		
2008	3,295	2018	3,314		
2009	3,267	2019	3,158		

== Surrounding area ==
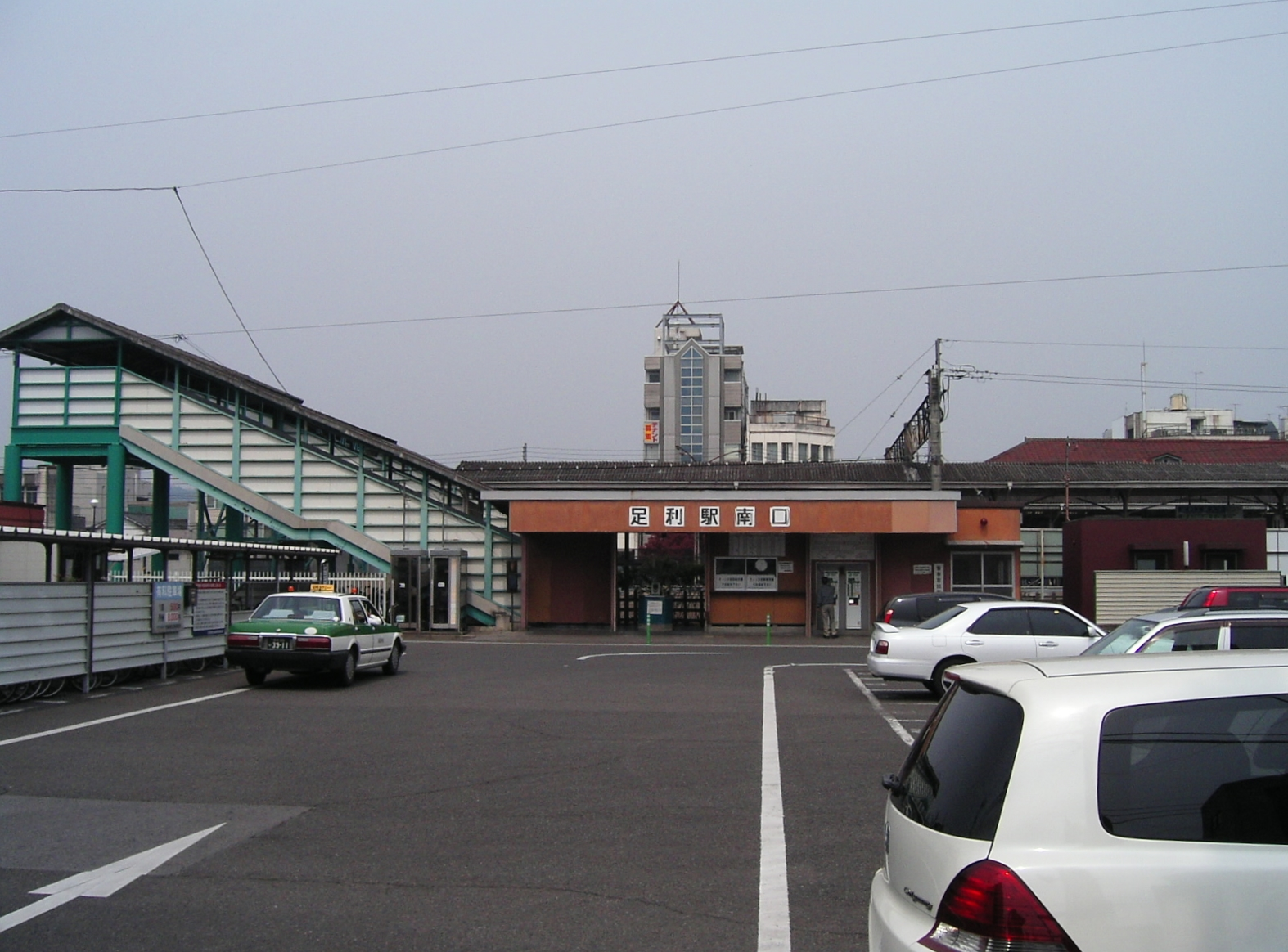
The south side of the station in April 2007

- Ashikagashi Station (Tobu Isesaki Line)
- Ashikaga Gakkō
- Orihime Shrine
- Banna-ji temple
- National Route 293
- Ashikaga City Hall
- Ashikaga Central Post Office
- Watarase River

== See also ==
- List of railway stations in Japan
