= Gōdo Station (Gunma) =

Railway station in Midori, Gunma Prefecture, Japan

WK12 Gōdo Station 神戸駅
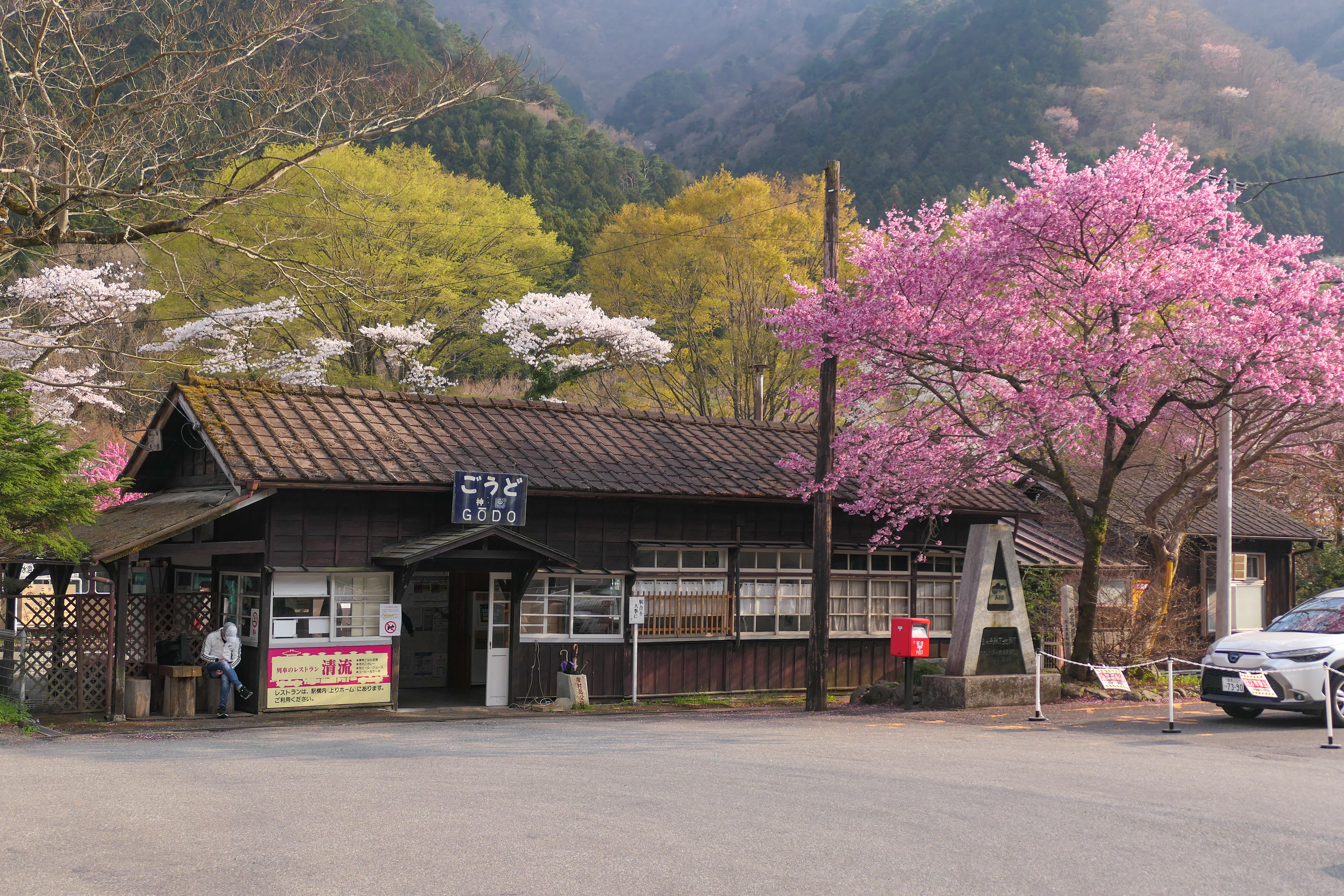
- Gōdo Station, April 2023

General information
- Location: Azuma-cho Gōdo 891, Midori-shi, Gunma-ken 376-0304; Japan
- Coordinates: 36°32′15″N 139°21′23″E
- Operator: Watarase Keikoku Railway
- Line: Watarase Keikoku Line
- Distance: 26.4 km from Kiryū
- Platforms: 1 side + 1 island platform

Other information
- Status: Unstaffed
- Station code: WK12
- Website: Official website

History
- Opened: 6 September 1912

Passengers
- FY2015: 227

Services
| Preceding station | Watarase Keikoku Railway | Following station |
|---|---|---|
| Mizunuma WK08 towards Aioi | Watarase Keikoku Line Watarase Keikoku-gō | Sōri WK13 towards Ashio |
| Konaka WK11 towards Kiryū | Watarase Keikoku Line | Sōri WK13 towards Matō |
Location
- Location within Gunma Prefecture Location within Japan

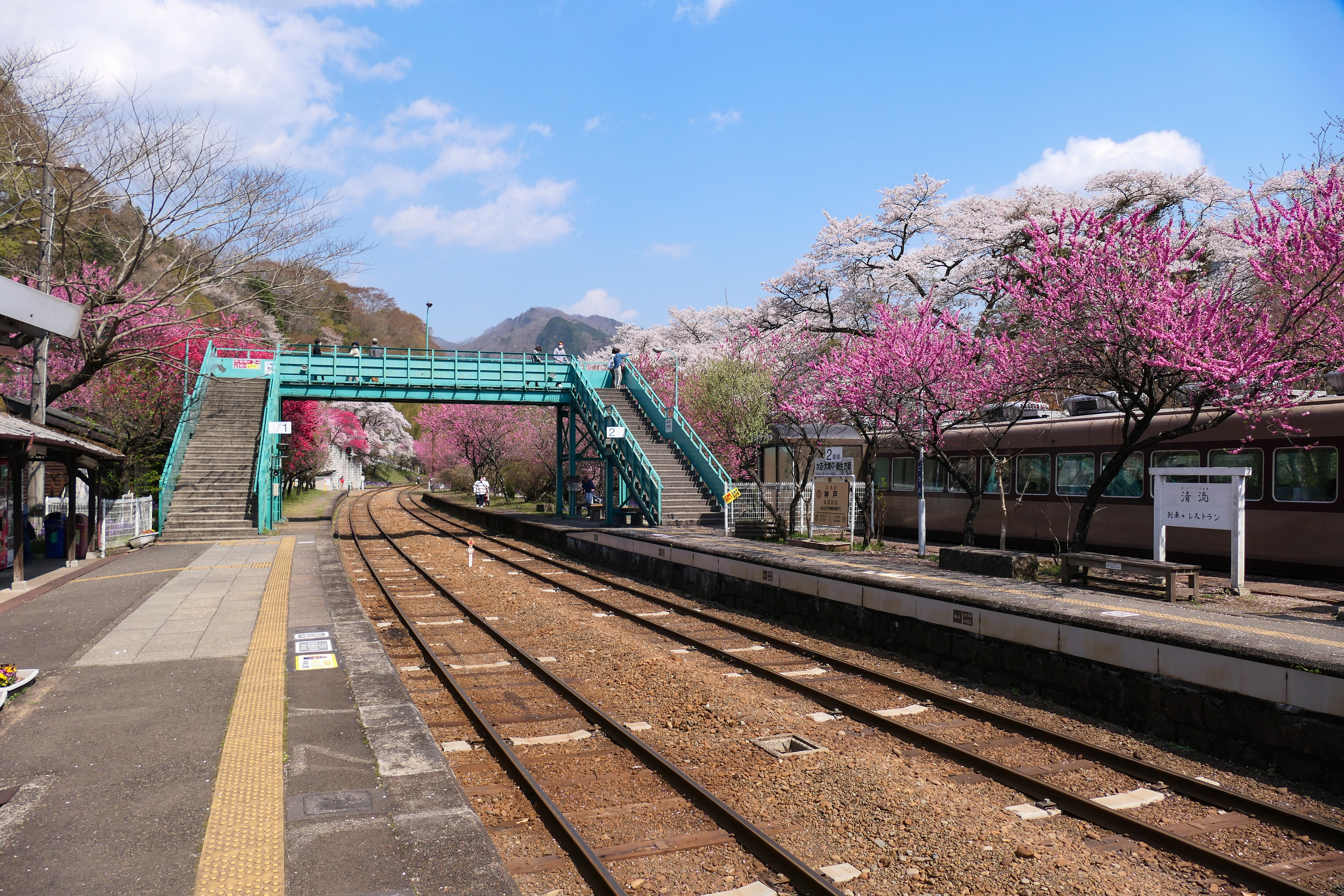
Platform, April 2023, showing entrance to restaurant car

Gōdo Station (神戸駅, Gōdo-eki) is a passenger railway station in the city of Midori, Gunma, Japan, operated by the third sector railway company Watarase Keikoku Railway.

== Lines ==
Gōdo Station is a station on the Watarase Keikoku Line and is 26.4 kilometers from the terminus of the line at Kiryū.

== Station layout ==
The station has a single side platform and an island platform; however, one side of the island platform is not in use for traffic, thus effectively the station has two opposed side platforms. On the unused portion of the island platform, two carriages from a former Tobu Railway Type 1720 are permanently parked as a restaurant.

== History ==
Gōdo Station opened on 6 September 1912 as a station on the Ashio Railway, but used the kanji “神土駅” to avoid confusion with the Kōbe Station in Hyōgo Prefecture. The kanji was changed to its present form on 29 March 1989 to match the local place name. The station building and platform were registered by the national government as a national Tangible Cultural Property in 2009. Two ancillary buildings, the rest house and the dangerous goods storeroom, were also granted the same Registered Tangible Cultural Property status later the same year.

== Surrounding area ==
- National Route 122
- Kusaki Dam
- Azuma Elementary School
- Azuma Middle School

== In popular culture ==
The station features in the final scene of the 2009 film Tenshi no Koi, but instead uses the station name "Furada" in its signage.

== See also ==
- List of railway stations in Japan
