= 1912 in rail transport =

This article lists events related to rail transport that occurred in 1912.

== Events ==
=== January events ===
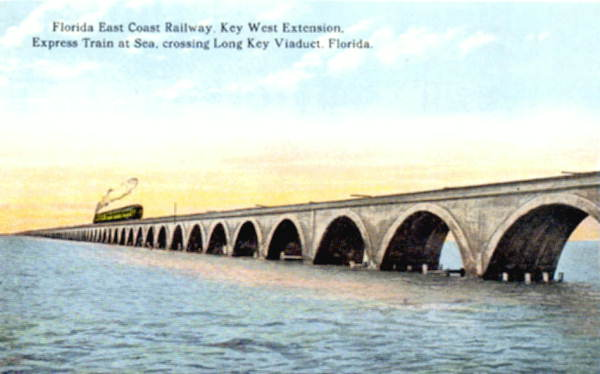
January 22 – The Overseas Railroad opens in Florida

- January 1 – The classification and renumbering of all the rolling stock of the three constituent railways that formed South African Railways in 1910 is implemented.
- January 3 – Canadian Pacific Railway leases the Dominion Atlantic Railway in Nova Scotia.
- January 22 – Florida East Coast Railway opens the Key West Extension in Florida.

=== February events ===
- February 1 – Stamford Brook station opens in suburban London serving District Railway and London and South Western Railway trains.
- February 7 – Official opening ceremonies are held for the Usambara Railway in German East Africa.
- February 11 – Togura Station, in Chikuma, Nagano, Japan, opens.
- February 27 – Pacific Great Eastern Railway (predecessor of the British Columbia Railway) is incorporated to build a line from Vancouver north to a connection with the Grand Trunk Pacific Railway at Prince George, British Columbia.

=== March events ===
- March 17 – First section of Italian Libya Railways (950 mm (3 ft 1 3/8 in) gauge) opens from Tripoli.

=== April events ===
- April 15 – Metre gauge electrified section of Tramways de Nice et du Littoral opens from Menton to Sospel in the Alpes-Maritimes of France.

=== June events ===
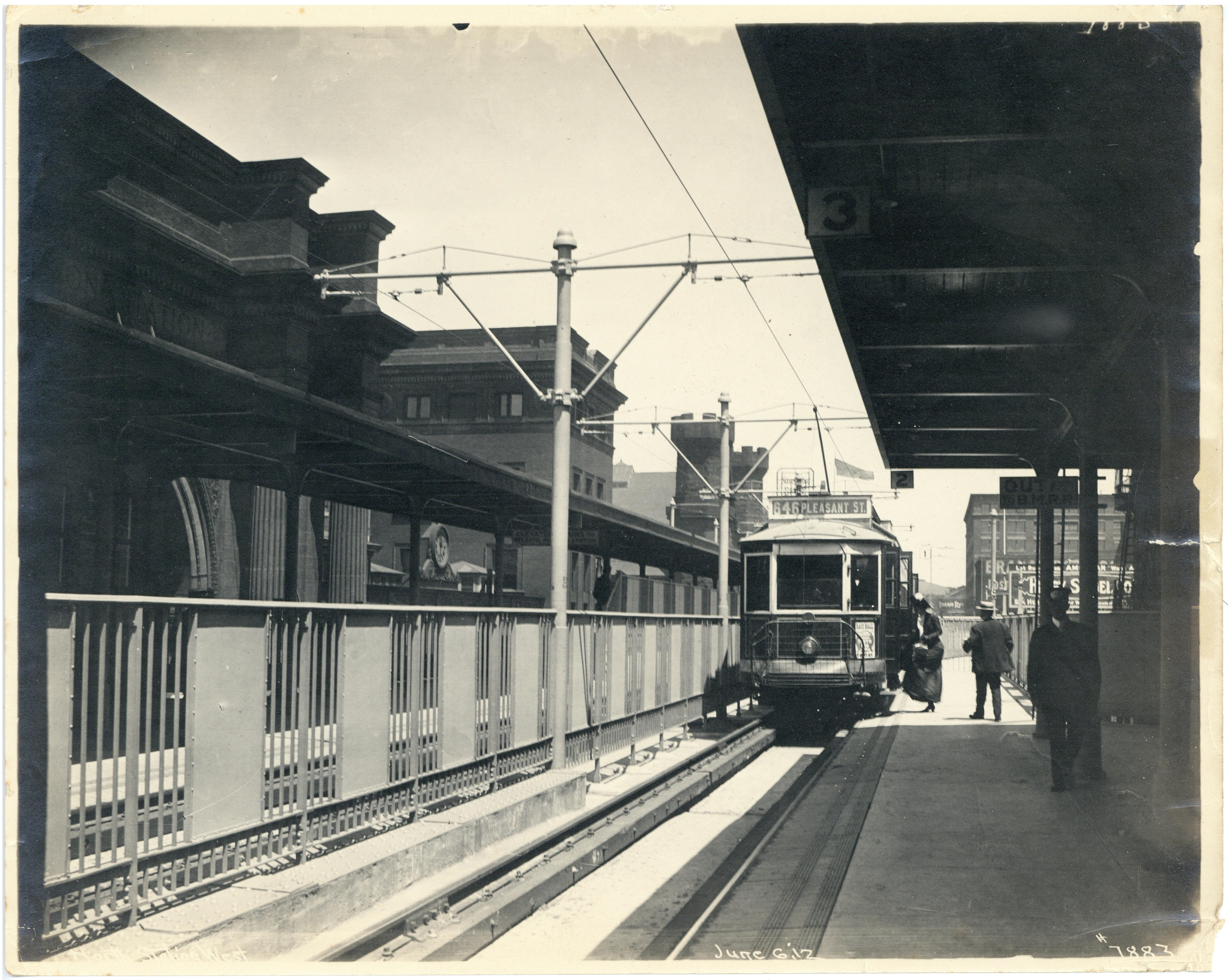
A Pleasant Street-bound streetcar at the southbound platform at North Station in 1912, five days after the Causeway Street Elevated opened

- June 1 – The first streetcars cross the new Lechmere Viaduct and run on the Causeway Street Elevated line in revenue service in Boston.
- June 2 – Chicago, Lake Shore and South Bend Railroad, predecessor of the Chicago South Shore and South Bend Railroad, begins "one-car" passenger service directly to the Chicago Loop.

=== August events ===
- August 1 – Jungfraubahn mountain rack railway in Switzerland completed by inauguration of the subterranean Jungfraujoch railway station, Europe's highest at 3,450 metres (11,320 ft) above sea level.

=== September events ===
- September 5 – The Ashio Railway (modern-day Watarase Keikoku Line) in Gunma and Tochigi Prefectures in Japan is extended from Omama Station out to Kodo Station.
- September 17 – The Ditton Junction rail crash near Widnes in England kills 15.

=== November events ===
- November – The Royal Bavarian State Railways begins the process of standardising the railway electrification systems in German-speaking countries at 15 kV AC, 16.6 Hz.
- November 11 – The Ashio Railway (modern-day Watarase Keikoku Line) in Gunma and Tochigi Prefectures in Japan is extended from Sori Station out to Kodo Station.
- November 24 – The Pennsylvania Railroad’s premier Chicago to New York train is christened the Broad Way Limited (named for the railroad’s four-track main line, not the New York City Theater District).

=== December events ===
- December 31 – The Ashio Railway (modern-day Watarase Keikoku Line) in Gunma and Tochigi Prefectures in Japan is extended from Sori Station to Ashio Station.

=== Unknown date events ===
- First Э 0-10-0 steam locomotive introduced in Russia. This will become the world's largest class with around 14,000 built.
- The world’s first diesel locomotive designed for main line use, built by Gesellschaft für Thermolokomotiven Diesel-Klose-Sulzer GmbH for the Prussian state railways, Germany, receives trials on the Winterthur–Romanshorn line in Switzerland prior to delivery to Berlin for more trials in September. The unit has direct mechanical transmission with a weight of 95 tonnes, power of 883 kW and a theoretical maximum speed of 100 km/h but will not prove to be a commercial success.
- Berne gauge European standard loading gauge agreed at an international railway conference held and consequent convention signed in Bern, Switzerland.
- Portland Company completes the last freight car commercially manufactured for Maine narrow gauge railroads.
- Oliver Bury moves from the General Manager position at the Great Northern Railway in England to a directorship.

== Births ==
=== March births ===
- March 14 – W. Graham Claytor, Jr., president of Amtrak 1982-1993 (died 1994).

== Deaths ==
=== June deaths ===
- June 16 – Eli H. Janney, inventor of the knuckle coupler (born 1831).

=== July deaths ===
- July 29 – William D. Washburn, first president of Soo Line Railroad 1883-1889, dies (b. 1931).
