= Midori, Gunma =

Midori みどり市
- City
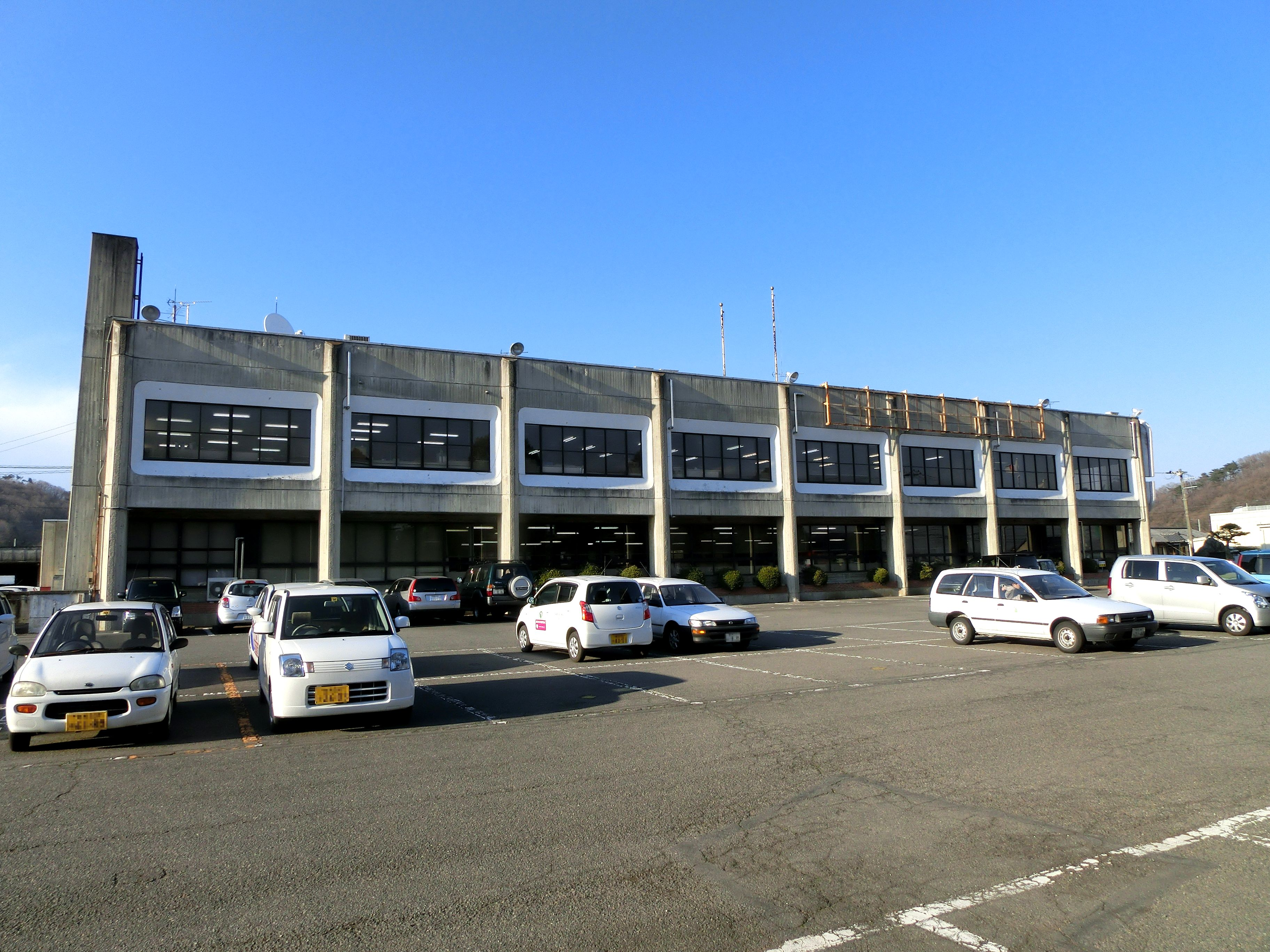
- Midori city hall

- Flag Seal

- Location of Midori in Gunma Prefecture

- Coordinates: 36°23′41.3″N 139°16′52.1″E
- Country: Japan
- Region: Kantō
- Prefecture: Gunma

Area
  - Total: 208.42 km^{2} (80.47 sq mi)

Population (August 31, 2020)
  - Total: 50,266
  - Density: 241.18/km^{2} (624.64/sq mi)
- Time zone: UTC+9 (Japan Standard Time)
- Tree: Yoshino sakura
- Flower: Erythronium japonicum; Chrysanthemum
- Bird: Green pheasant
- Phone number: 0277-76-2111
- Address: 2952 Shika, Kasakake-machi, Midori-shi, Gunma-ken 379-2395
- Website: Official website

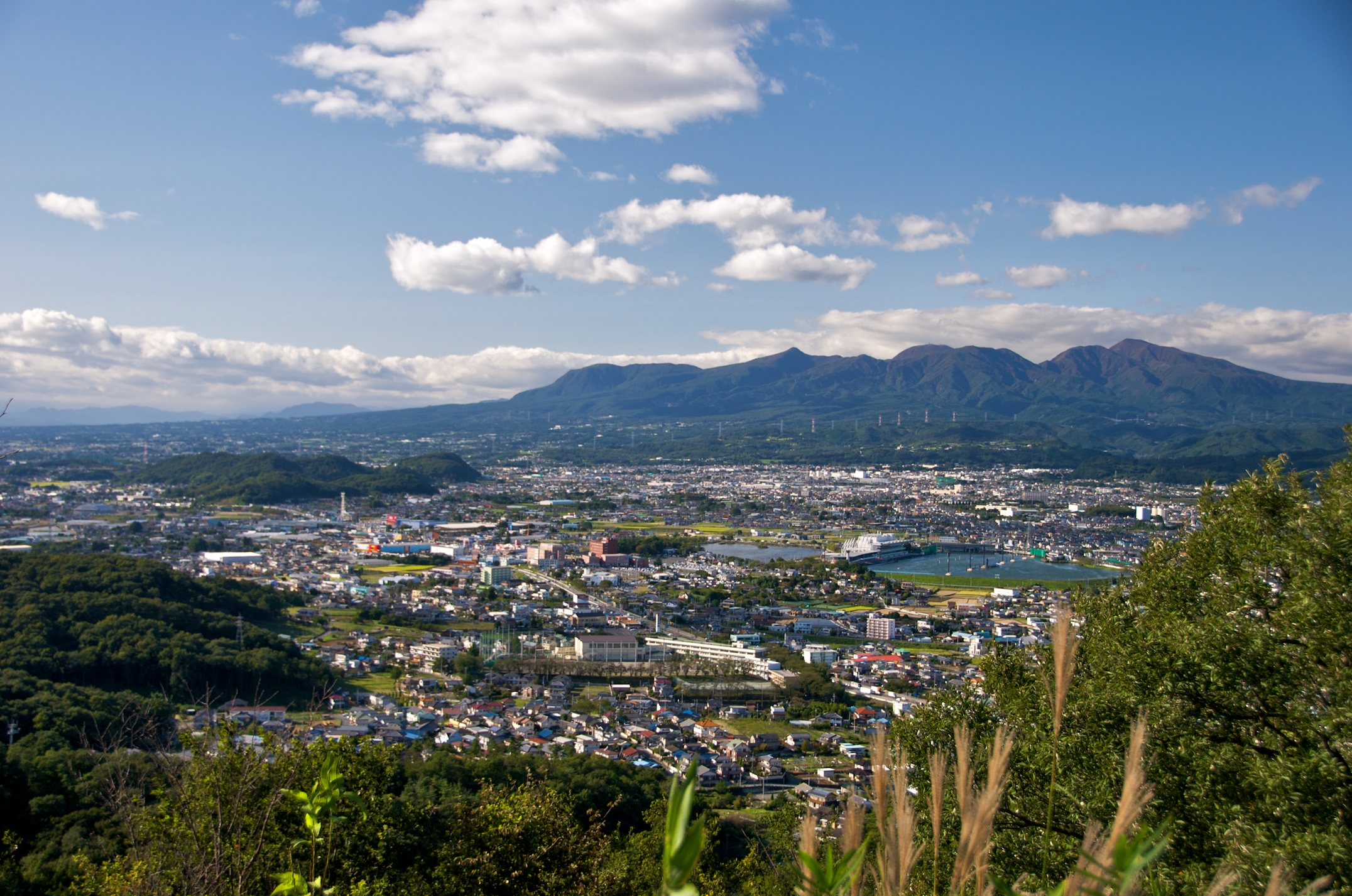
Mount Akagi and then outskirts of Kiryū and Midori cities

Midori (みどり市, Midori-shi) is a city located in Gunma Prefecture, Japan. As of 31 August 2020, the city had an estimated population of 50,266 in 21,028 households, and a population density of 240 persons per km^{2}. The total area of the city is 208.42 square kilometres (80.47 sq mi).

== Geography ==
Midori is located in eastern Gunma Prefecture in the northern Kantō Plains. The city is shaped like an inverse triangle, bordered by Tochigi Prefecture to the north, and by the city of Kiryū to the east and west. The Watarase River runs through parts of Midori City.

=== Surrounding municipalities ===
Gunma Prefecture

- Isesaki
- Kiryū
- Numata
- Ōta

Tochigi Prefecture

- Kanuma
- Nikkō
- Sano

=== Climate ===
Midori has a humid subtropical climate (Köppen Cfa) characterized by warm summers and cold winters with heavy snowfall. The average annual temperature in Midori is 14.0 °C. The average annual rainfall is 1296 mm with September as the wettest month. The temperatures are highest on average in August, at around 26.3 °C, and lowest in January, at around 2.7 °C.

== Demographics ==
Per Japanese census data, the population of Midori has recently plateaued after a long period of growth.

Historical population
Year	Pop.	±%
1960	33,442	—
1970	34,969	+4.6%
1980	44,064	+26.0%
1990	49,502	+12.3%
2000	51,266	+3.6%
2010	51,900	+1.2%
2020	49,648	−4.3%

== History ==
The city of Midori was established on March 27, 2006, from the merger of the town of Ōmama (from Yamada District), the town of Kasakake (from Nitta District), and the village of Azuma (from Seta District). All three districts were dissolved as a result of this merger.

== Government ==
Midori has a mayor-council form of government with a directly elected mayor and a unicameral city council of 18 members. Midori contributes one member to the Gunma Prefectural Assembly. In terms of national politics, the city is part of Gunma 1st district of the lower house of the Diet of Japan.

== Economy ==
Midori is noted for its production of tomatoes and eggplants.

== Education ==
Midori has seven public elementary schools and five public middle schools operated by the city government, and one public high school operated by the Gunma Prefectural Board of Education. The prefecture also operates one special education school for the handicapped. Kiryu University and its associated junior college are located in Midori.

- Elementary schools
  - Azuma Elementary School
  - Kasakake Elementary School
  - Kasakake Kita Elementary School
  - Kasakake Higashi Elementary School
  - Omama Higashi Elementary School
  - Omama Kita Elementary School
  - Omama Minami Elementary School
- Middle schools
  - Azuma Middle School
  - Kasakake Middle School
  - Kasakake Minami Middle School
  - Omama Higashi Middle School
  - Omama Middle School
- High schools
  - Omama High School
- Universities
  - Kiryu University

Hanawa Elementary School closed, and later became a museum.

== Transportation ==
=== Railway ===
JR East – Ryōmō Line

- Iwajuku

Watarase Keikoku Railway – Watarase Keikoku Line

- Ōmama – Kamikambai – (Motojuku – Mizunuma) – Hanawa – Nakano – Konaka – Gōdo – Sōri

Jōmō Electric Railway Company - Jōmō Line

- Akagi

Tōbu Railway – Tōbu Kiryū Line

- Azami – (Shin-Kiryū – Aioi) – Akagi

=== Highway ===
- National Route 50
- National Route 122
- National Route 353

== Local attractions ==
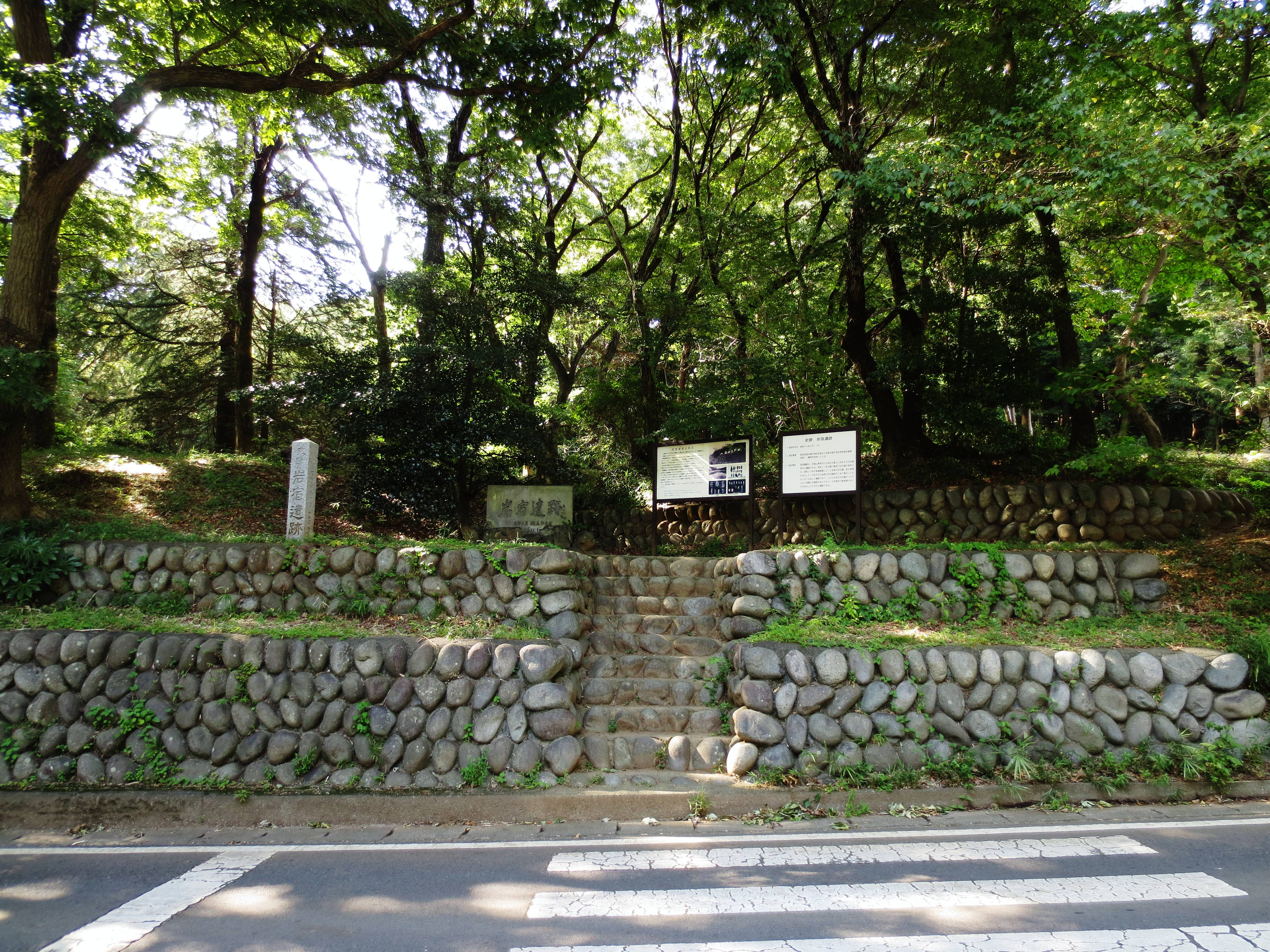
Iwajuku ruins

- Iwajuku, National Historic Site
- Tomihiro Art Museum

== Notable people ==
- Yui Ogura, voice actress, singer
- Yamato Wakatsuki, professional football player
