= Tsūdō Station =

Railway station in Nikkō, Tochigi Prefecture, Japan

WK15 Tsūdō Station 通洞駅
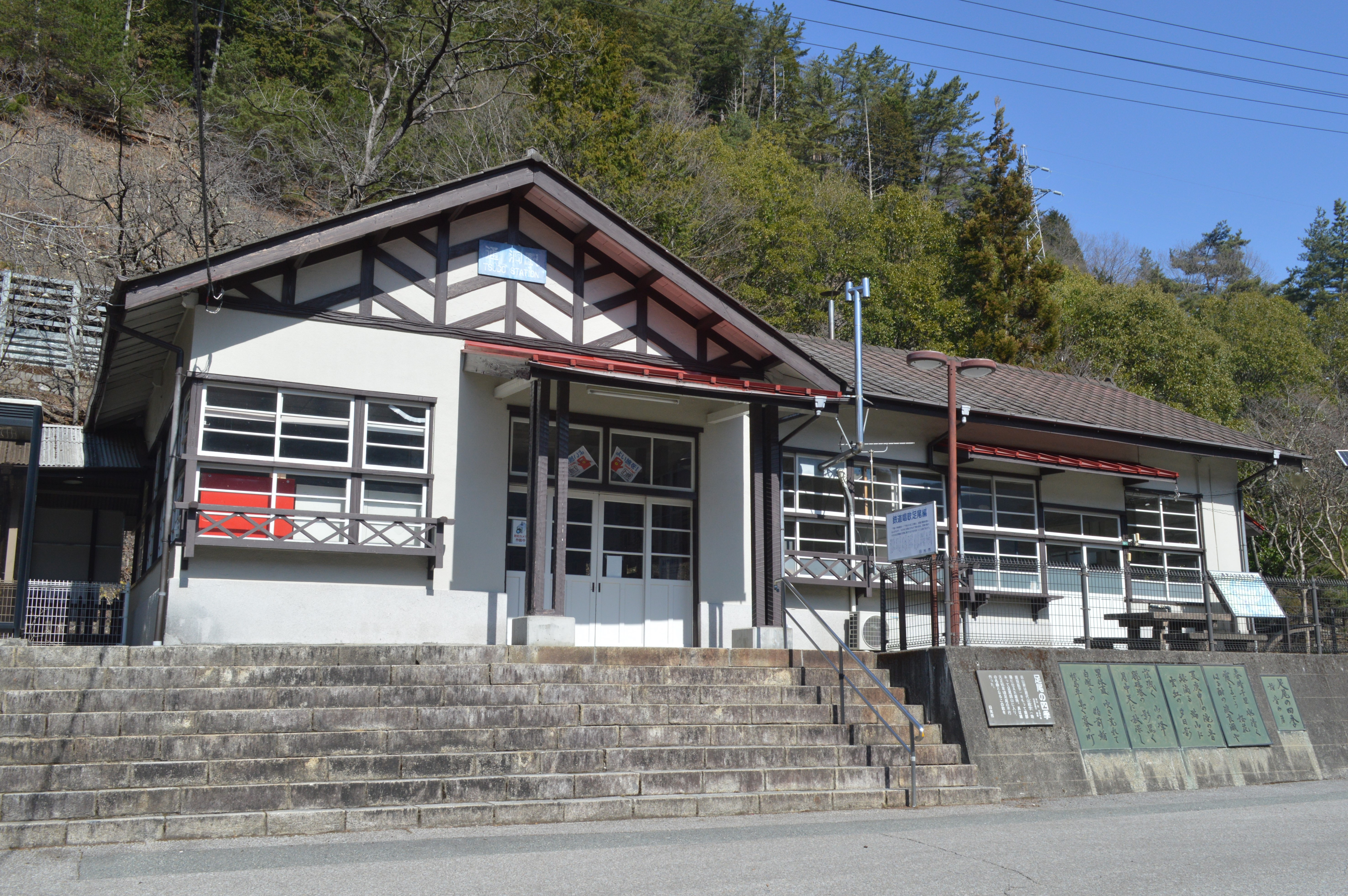
- Tsūdō Station, March 2024

General information
- Location: Ashiomachi Matsubara 13, Nikkō-shi, Tochigi-ken 321-1523; Japan
- Coordinates: 36.6368°N 139.4397°E
- Operator: Watarase Keikoku Railway
- Line: Watarase Keikoku Line
- Distance: 41.9 km from Kiryū
- Platforms: 1 side platform

Other information
- Station code: WK15
- Website: Official website

History
- Opened: 31 December 1912

Passengers
- FY2015: 57 daily

Services
Preceding station	Watarase Keikoku Railway	Following station
Sōri WK13 towards Aioi	Watarase Keikoku Line Watarase Keikoku-gō	Ashio WK16 Terminus
Haramukō WK14 towards Kiryū	Watarase Keikoku Line	Ashio WK16 towards Matō
Location
- Location within Tochigi Prefecture Location within Japan

Tsūdō Station (通洞駅, Tsūdō-eki) is a railway station in the city of Nikkō, Tochigi, Japan, operated by the Watarase Keikoku Railway.

== Lines ==
Tsūdō Station is a station on the Watarase Keikoku Line and is 41.9 kilometers from the terminus of the line at Kiryū.

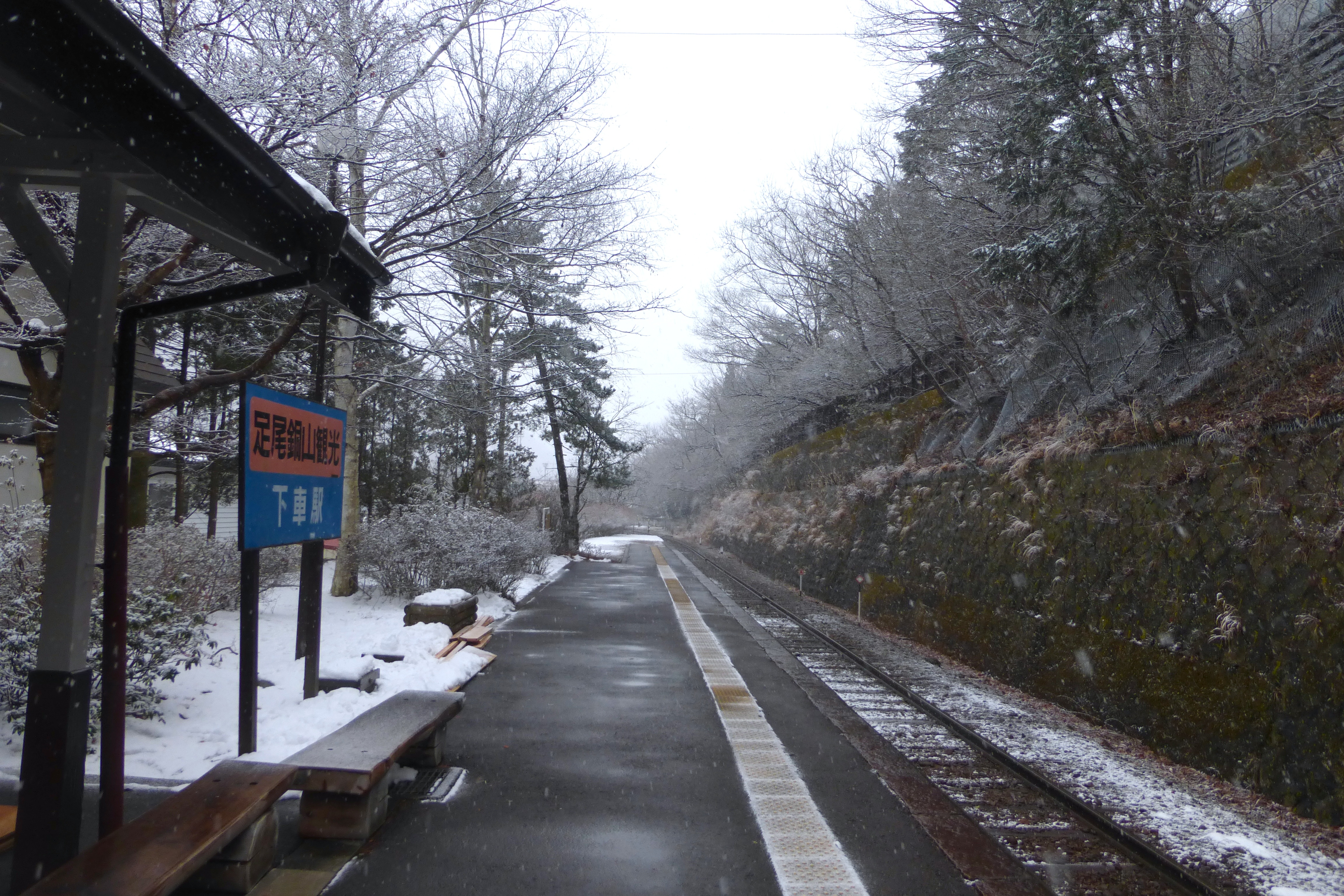
Station platform on a snowy day, 2015

== Station layout ==
The station consists of a single side platform serving traffic in both directions.

== History ==
Tsūdō Station opened on 31 December 1912 as a station on the Ashio Railway. The station building and platform received protection by the national government as a national Registered Tangible Cultural Property in 2009.

== Surrounding area ==
- Ashio Copper Mine is 5 minutes on foot from this station.
- former Ashio Town Hall
- Ashio Post Office
- National Route 122

== See also ==
- List of railway stations in Japan
