= Mizunuma Station =

Railway station in Kiryū, Gunma Prefecture, Japan

WK08 Mizunuma Station 水沼駅
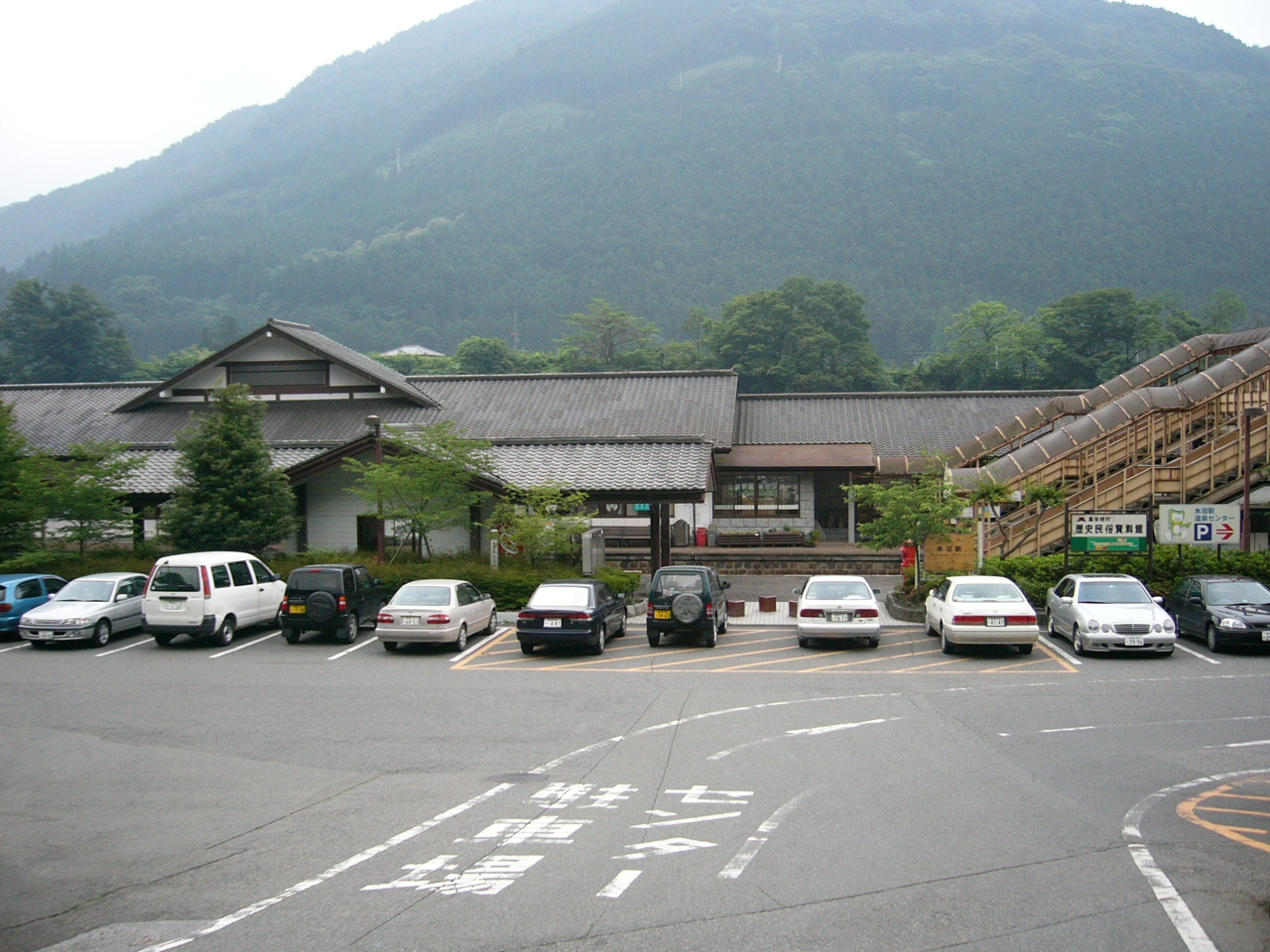
- Mizunuma Station, June 2005

General information
- Location: 151 Mizunuma Kurohone-cho, Kiryū City, Gunma Prefecture 376-0141; Japan
- Coordinates: 36.5000°N 139.2777°E
- Operator: Watarase Keikoku Railway
- Line: Watarase Keikoku Line
- Distance: 16.9 km (10.5 mi) from Kiryū
- Platforms: 2 side platforms
- Tracks: 2

Construction
- Structure type: At grade

Other information
- Status: Unstaffed
- Station code: WK08
- Website: Official website

History
- Opened: 5 September 1912; 113 years ago
- Former names: Mizunuma Teisha-jo (until 1918)

Passengers
- FY2019: 99

Services
Preceding station	Watarase Keikoku Railway	Following station
Ōmama WK05 towards Aioi	Watarase Keikoku Line Watarase Keikoku-gō	Gōdo WK12 towards Ashio
Motojuku WK07 towards Kiryū	Watarase Keikoku Line	Hanawa WK09 towards Matō
Location
- Location within Gunma Prefecture Location within Kanto Area Location within Japan

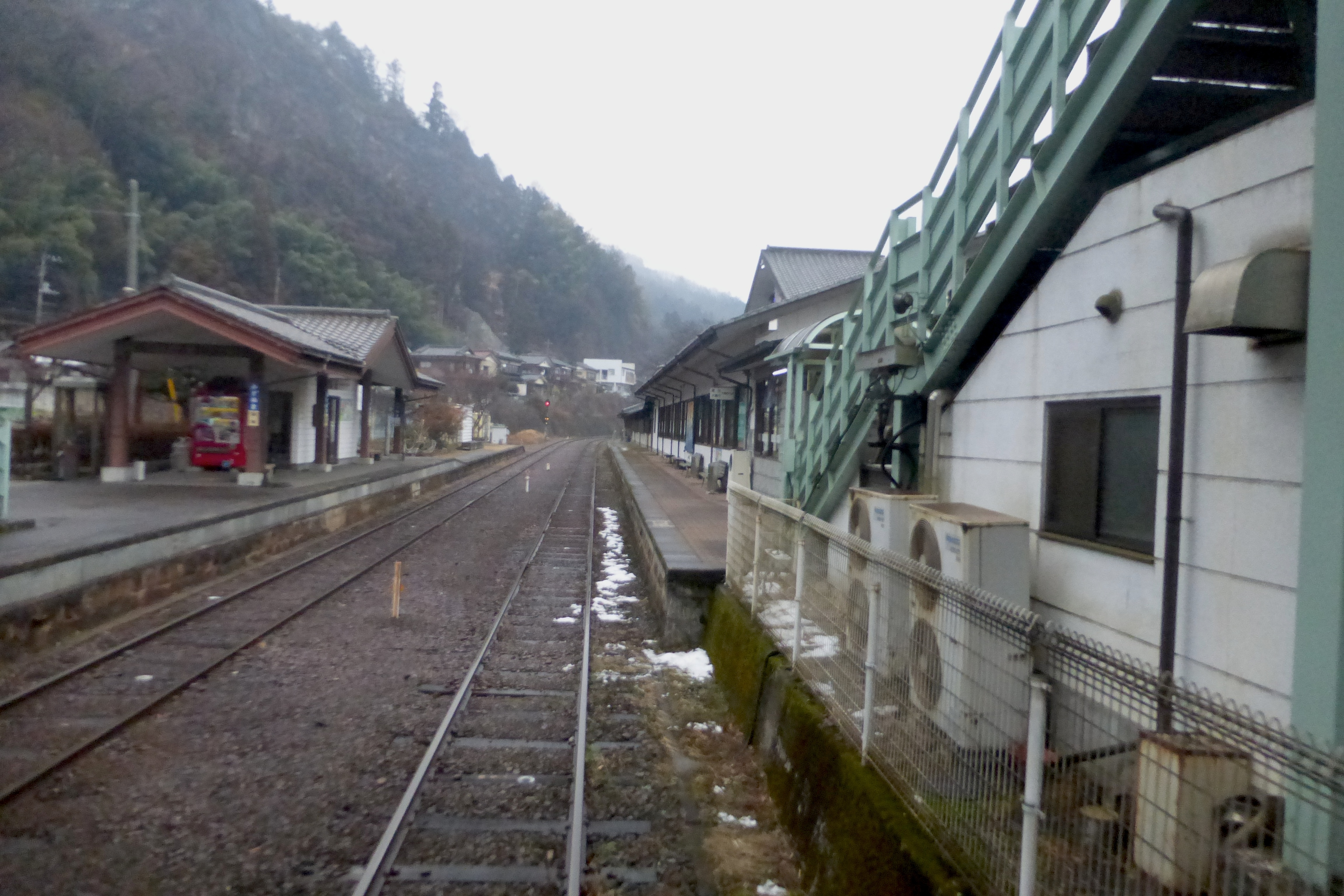
The station platforms, February 2015

Mizunuma Station (水沼駅, Mizunuma-eki) is a railway station in the city of Kiryū, Gunma, Japan, operated by the third sector railway company Watarase Keikoku Railway.

== Lines ==
Mizunuma Station is a station on the Watarase Keikoku Line and is 16.9 kilometers from the terminus of the line at Kiryū.

== Station layout ==
The station has a two opposed side platforms connected by a level crossing. The station is unattended.

== History ==
Mizunuma Station opened on 5 September 1912 as Mizunuma Teishajo (水沼停車場) on the Ashio Railway. It was renamed to its present name on 1 June 1918.

== Passenger statistics ==
In fiscal 2019, the station was used by an average of 99 passengers daily (boarding passengers only).

== Surrounding area ==
- former Mizunuma Village Hall
- Mizunuma Post Office
- National Route 122

== See also ==
- List of railway stations in Japan
