= Konaka Station =

Railway station in Midori, Gunma Prefecture, Japan

WK11 Konaka Station 小中駅
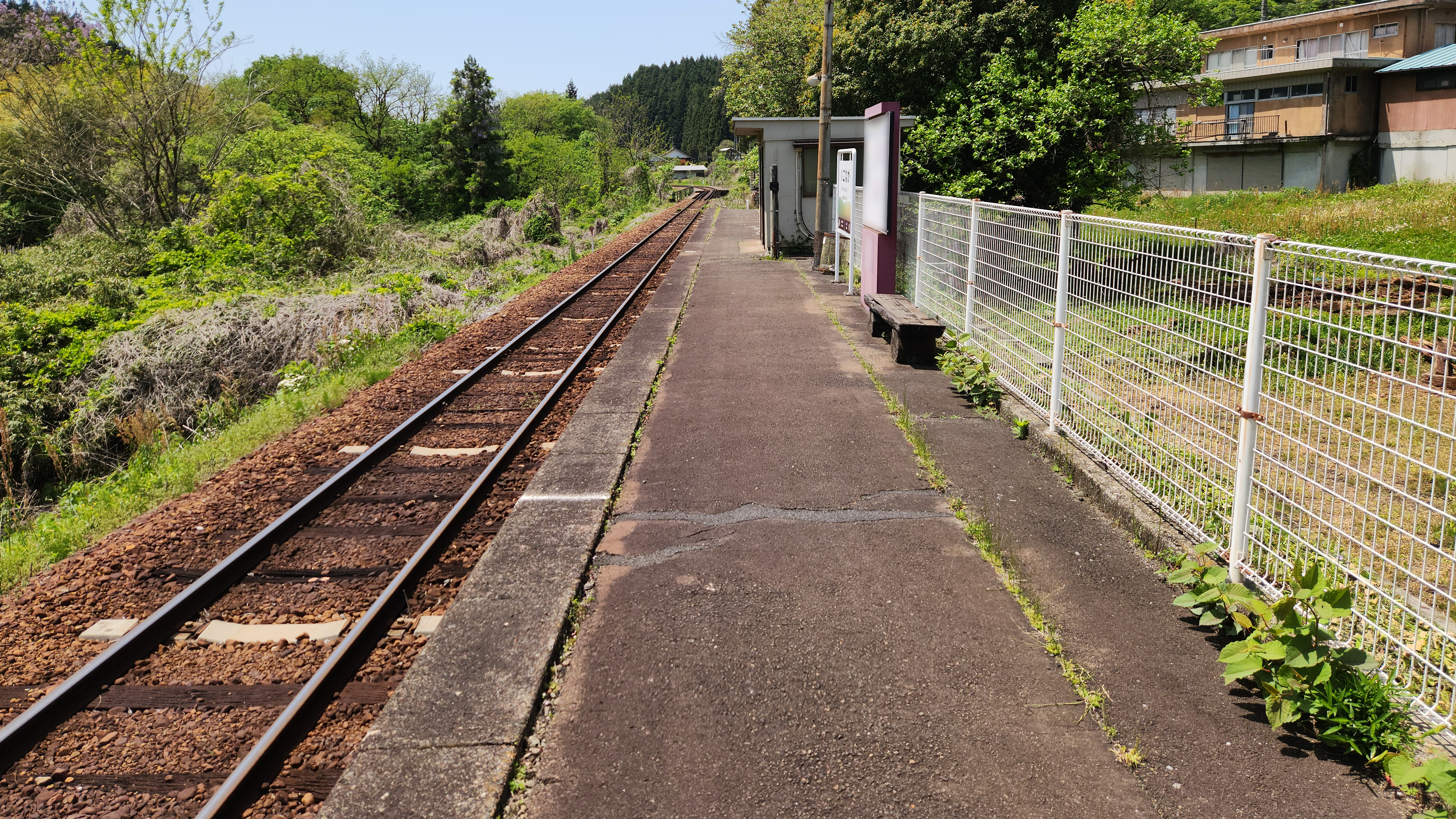
- Konaka Station, May 2025

General information
- Location: Azuma-cho Konaka 780, Midori-shi, Gunma-ken 376-0308; Japan
- Coordinates: 36.5354°N 139.3376°E
- Operator: Watarase Keikoku Railway
- Line: Watarase Keikoku Line
- Distance: 24.4 km from Kiryū
- Platforms: 1 side platform

Other information
- Status: Unstaffed
- Station code: WK11
- Website: Official website

History
- Opened: 31 December 1912

Passengers
- FY2015: 37

Services
Preceding station	Watarase Keikoku Railway	Following station
Nakano WK10 towards Kiryū	Watarase Keikoku Line	Gōdo WK12 towards Matō
Location
- Location within Gunma Prefecture Location within Japan

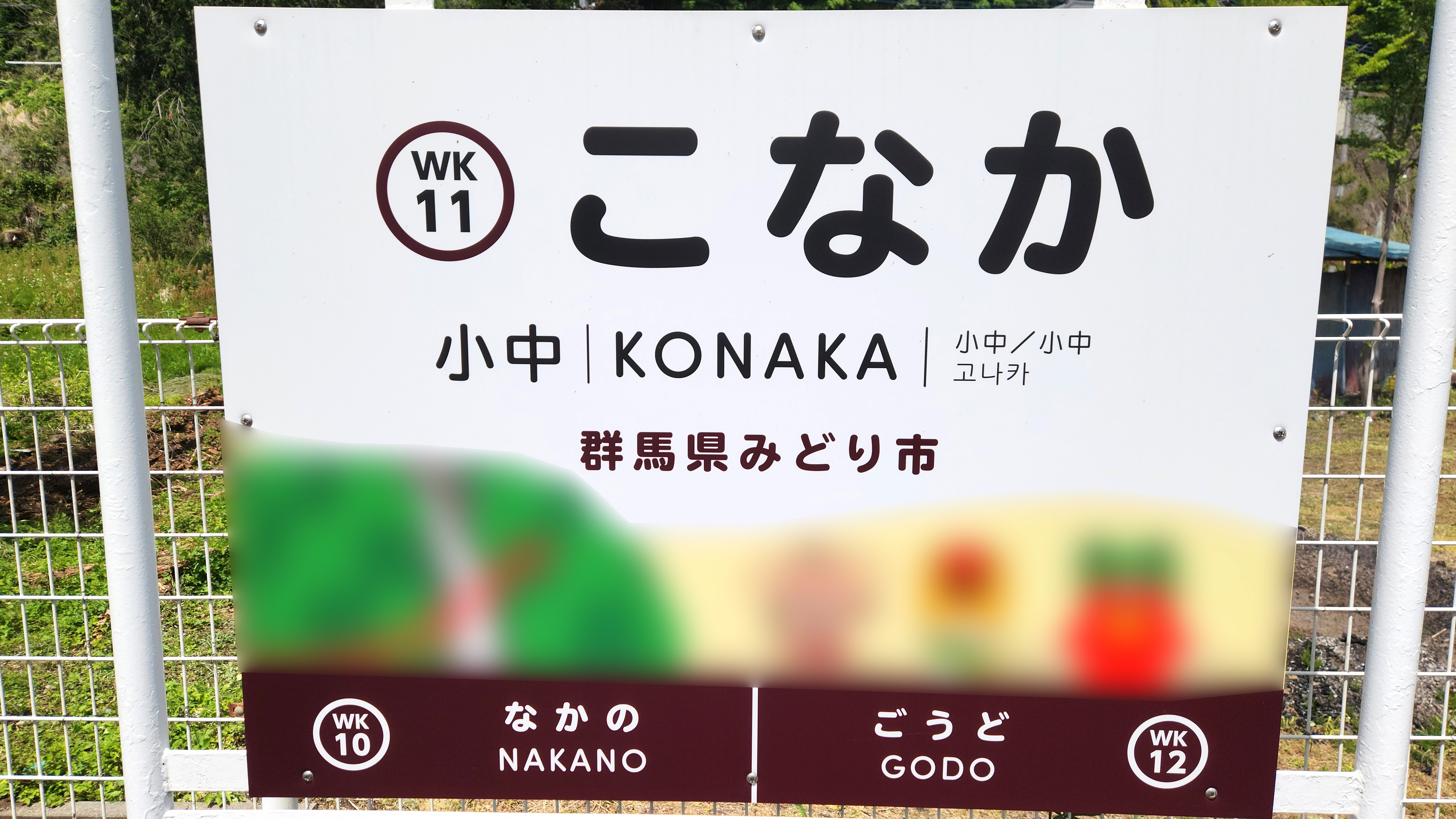
Station sign board, 2025.

Konaka Station (小中駅, Konaka-eki) is a passenger railway station in the city of Midori, Gunma, Japan, operated by the third sector railway company Watarase Keikoku Railway.

== Lines ==
Konaka Station is a station on the Watarase Keikoku Line and is 24.4 kilometers from the terminus of the line at Kiryū.

== Station layout ==
The station consists of a single side platform. There is no station building, but only a shelter on the platform. The station is unattended.

== History ==
Konaka Station opened on 31 December 1912.

== Surrounding area ==
- National Route 122

== See also ==
- List of railway stations in Japan
