= Haramukō Station =

Railway station in Nikkō, Tochigi Prefecture, Japan

WK14 Haramukō Station 原向駅
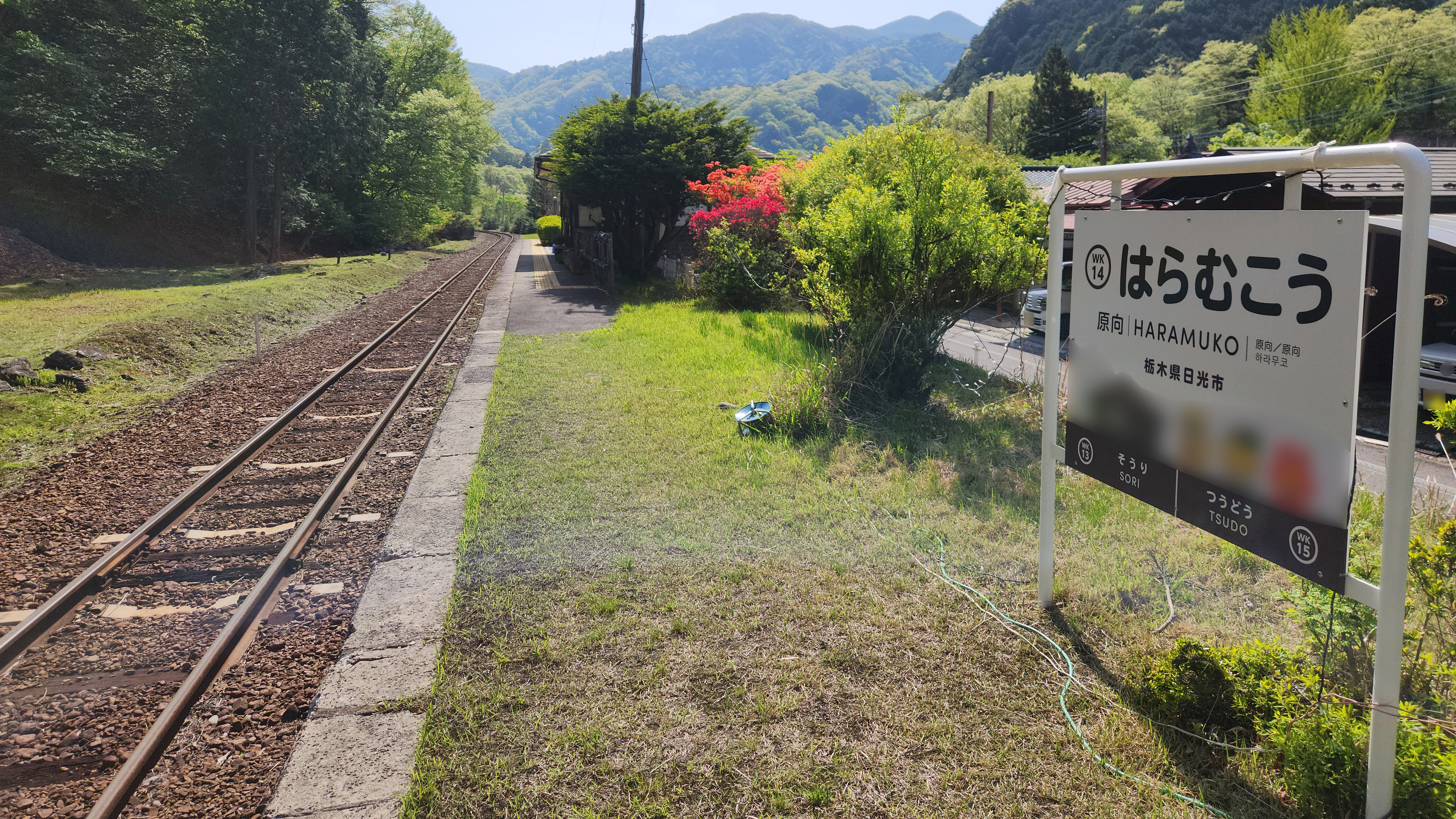
- Platform on May 2025

General information
- Location: Ashio-machi 3066, Nikkō-shi, Tochigi-ken 321-1511; Japan
- Coordinates: 36.6173°N 139.4204°E
- Operator: Watarase Keikoku Railway
- Line: Watarase Keikoku Line
- Distance: 38.7 km from Kiryū
- Platforms: 1 side platform

Other information
- Station code: WK14
- Website: Official website

History
- Opened: 31 December 1912

Passengers
- FY2015: 5 daily

Services
Preceding station	Watarase Keikoku Railway	Following station
Sōri WK13 towards Kiryū	Watarase Keikoku Line	Tsūdō WK15 towards Matō
Location
- Location within Tochigi Prefecture Location within Japan

Haramukō Station (原向駅, Haramukō-eki) is a railway station in the city of Nikkō, Tochigi, Japan, operated by the third-sector railway company Watarase Keikoku Railway.

== Lines ==
Haramukō Station is a station on the Watarase Keikoku Line and is 38.7 kilometers from the terminus of the line at Kiryū.

== Station layout ==
The station consists of a single side platform serving traffic in both directions. The station is unattended.

== History ==
Haramukō Station opened on 31 December 1912 as a station on the Ashio Railway.

== Surrounding area ==
- National Route 122

== See also ==
- List of railway stations in Japan
