= Undō-Kōen Station (Gunma) =

Railway station in Kiryū, Gunma Prefecture, Japan

WK04 Undō-Kōen Station 運動公園駅
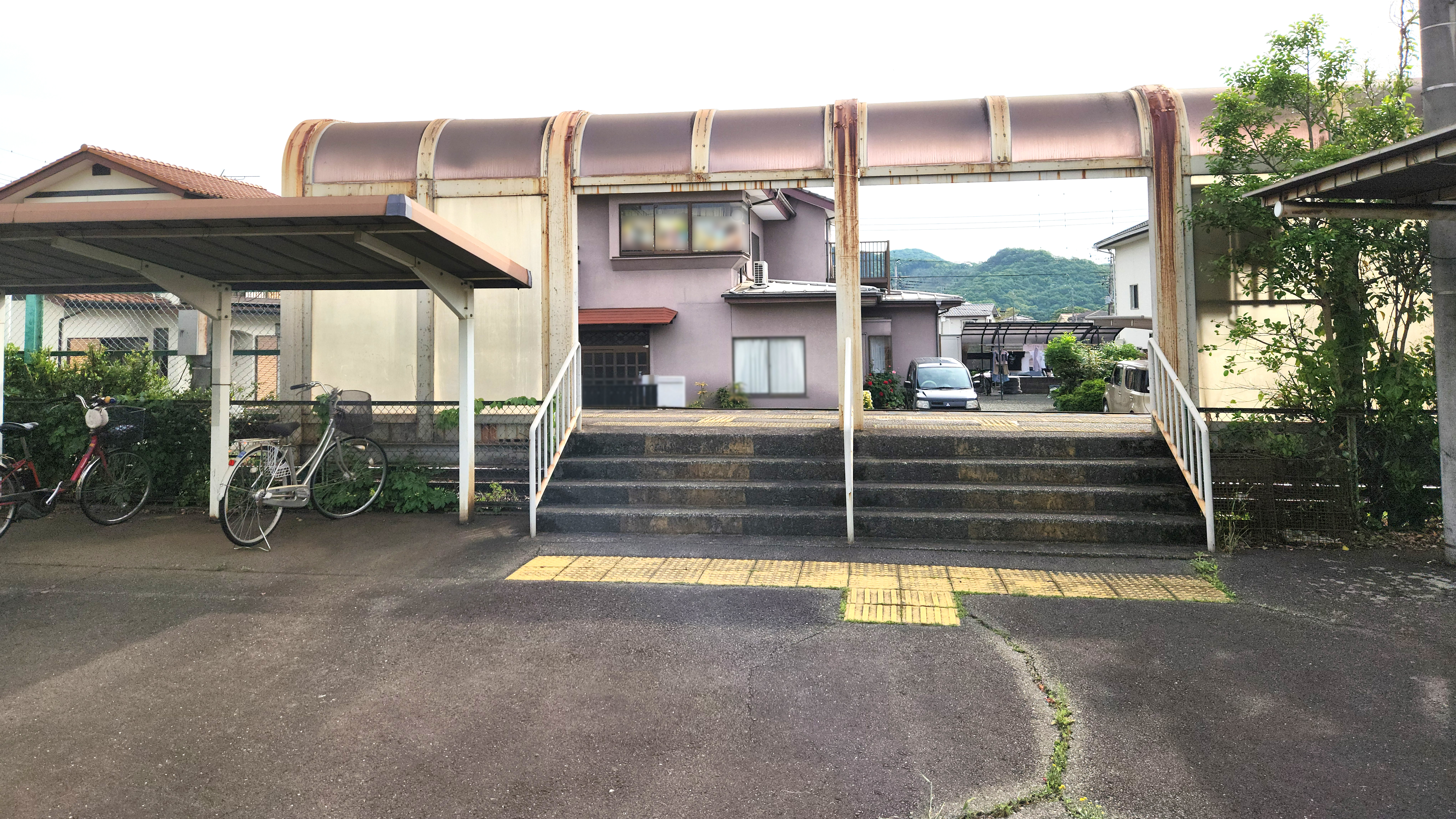
- The entrance, May 2025

General information
- Location: 246, Aioi-cho 3-chome, Kiryū-shi, Gunma-ken 376-0011; Japan
- Coordinates: 36°25′14″N 139°18′03″E
- Operator: Watarase Keikoku Railway
- Line: Watarase Keikoku Line
- Distance: 4.2 km from Kiryū
- Platforms: 1 side platform

Other information
- Status: Unstaffed
- Station code: WK04
- Website: Official website

History
- Opened: 5 September 1912

Passengers
- FY2019: 69

Services
Preceding station	Watarase Keikoku Railway	Following station
Aioi WK03 towards Kiryū	Watarase Keikoku Line	Ōmama WK05 towards Matō
Location
- Location within Gunma Prefecture Location within Japan

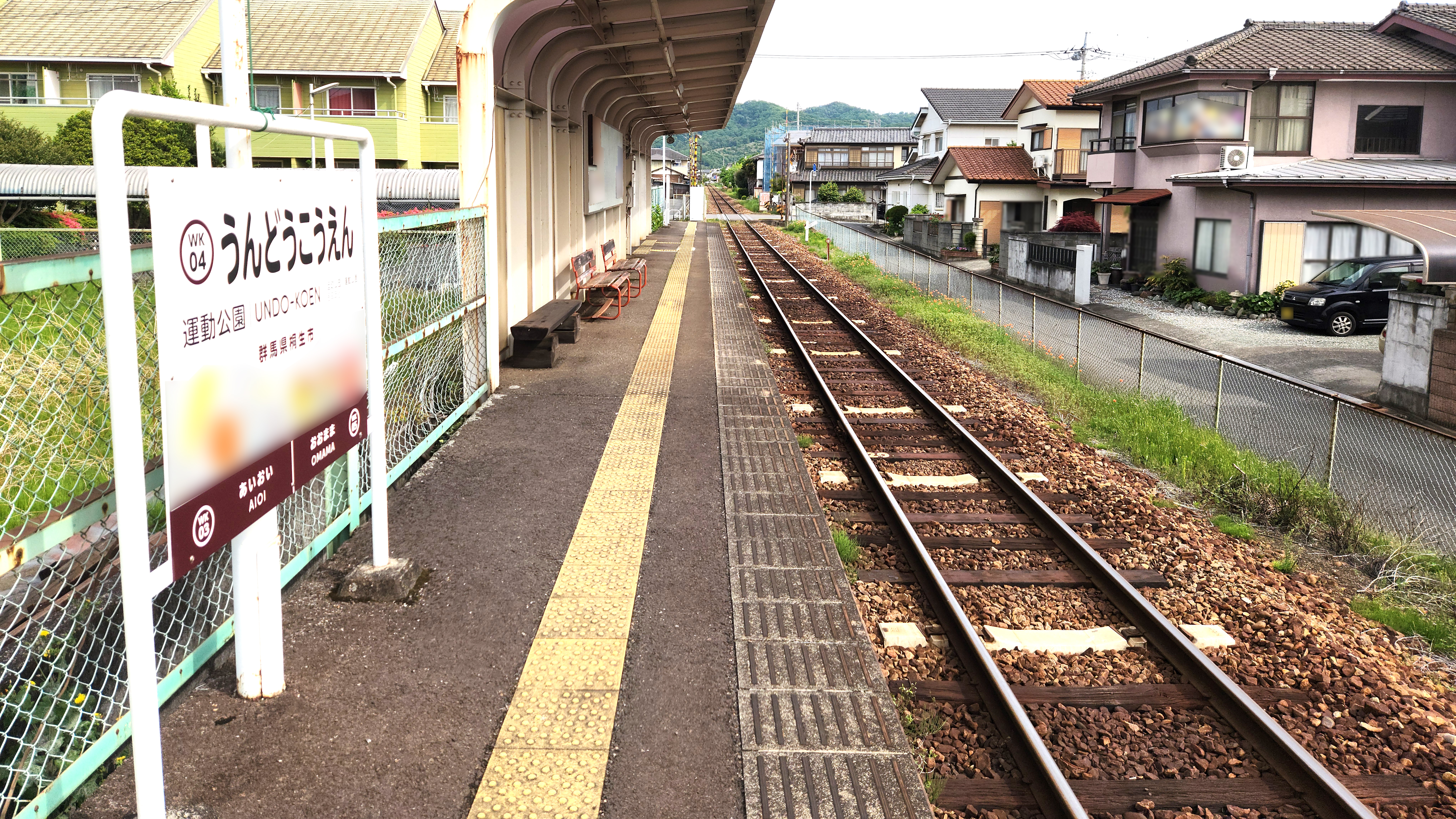
The platform, May 2025.

Undō-Kōen Station (運動公園駅, Undō-kōen-eki) is a passenger railway station in the city of Kiryū, Gunma, Japan, operated by the third sector railway company Watarase Keikoku Railway.

== Lines ==
Undō-kōen Station is a station on the Watarase Keikoku Line and is 4.2 kilometers from the terminus of the line at Kiryū.

== Station layout ==
The station consists of a single side platform serving traffic in both direction. There is no station building. The station is unattended.

== History ==
Undō-kōen Station opened on 29 March 1989.

== Passenger statistics ==
In fiscal 2019, the station was used by an average of 69 passengers daily (boarding passengers only).

== Surrounding area ==
- Kiryū Sports Park
- National Route 122

== See also ==
- List of railway stations in Japan
