= Nakano Station (Gunma) =

Railway station in Midori, Gunma Prefecture, Japan

WK10 Nakano Station 中野駅
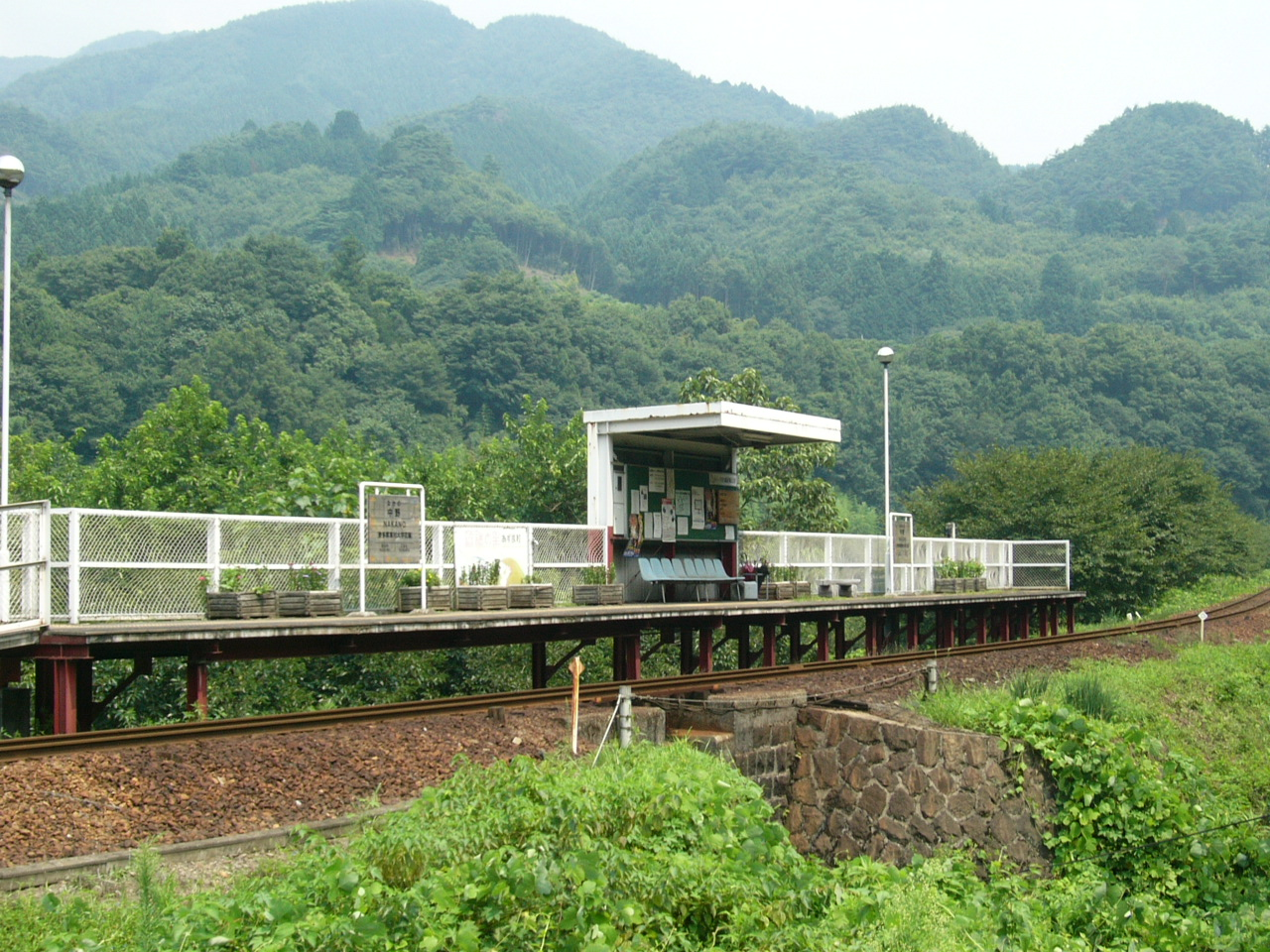
- Nakano Station, August 2004

General information
- Location: Azuma-cho Hanawa 613-1, Midori-shi, Gunma-ken 376-0307; Japan
- Coordinates: 36°31′27″N 139°19′02″E
- Operator: Watarase Keikoku Railway
- Line: Watarase Keikoku Line
- Distance: 21.0 km from Kiryū
- Platforms: 1 side platform

Other information
- Status: Unstaffed
- Station code: WK10
- Website: Official website

History
- Opened: 29 March 1989

Passengers
- FY2015: 6

Services
Preceding station	Watarase Keikoku Railway	Following station
Hanawa WK09 towards Kiryū	Watarase Keikoku Line	Konaka WK11 towards Matō
Location
- Location within Gunma Prefecture Location within Japan

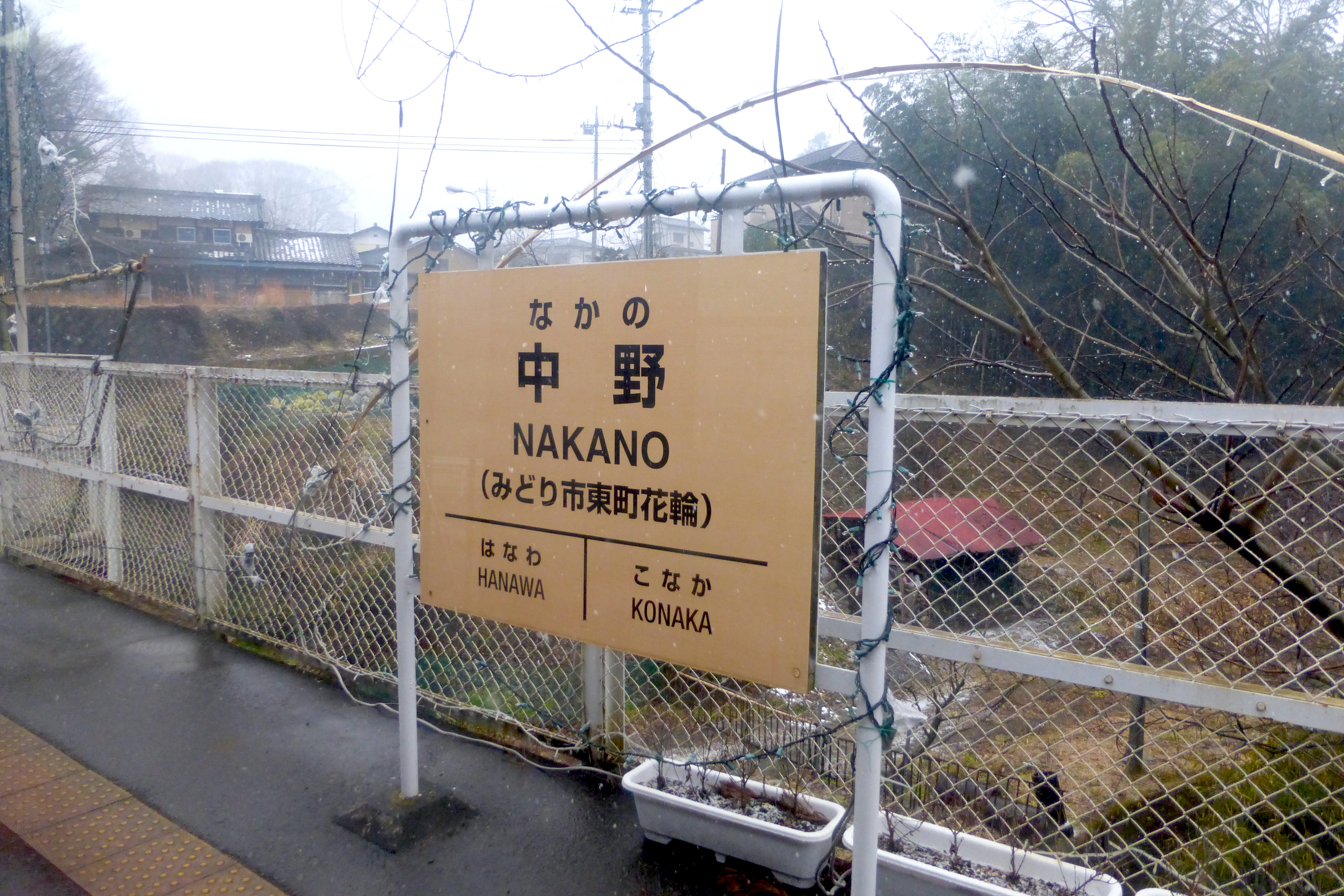
Station platform on a rainy day, 2015.

Nakano Station (中野駅, Nakano-eki) is a passenger railway station in the city of Midori, Gunma, Japan, operated by the third sector railway company Watarase Keikoku Railway.

== Lines ==
Nakano Station is a station on the Watarase Keikoku Line and is 21.0 kilometers from the terminus of the line at Kiryū.

== Station layout ==
The station consists of a single side platform. There is no station building, but only an open-sided shelter on the platform. The station is unattended.

== History ==
Nakano Station opened on 29 March 1989.

== Surrounding area ==
- National Route 122

== See also ==
- List of railway stations in Japan
