= Sōri Station =

Railway station in Midori, Gunma Prefecture, Japan

WK13 Sōri Station 沢入駅
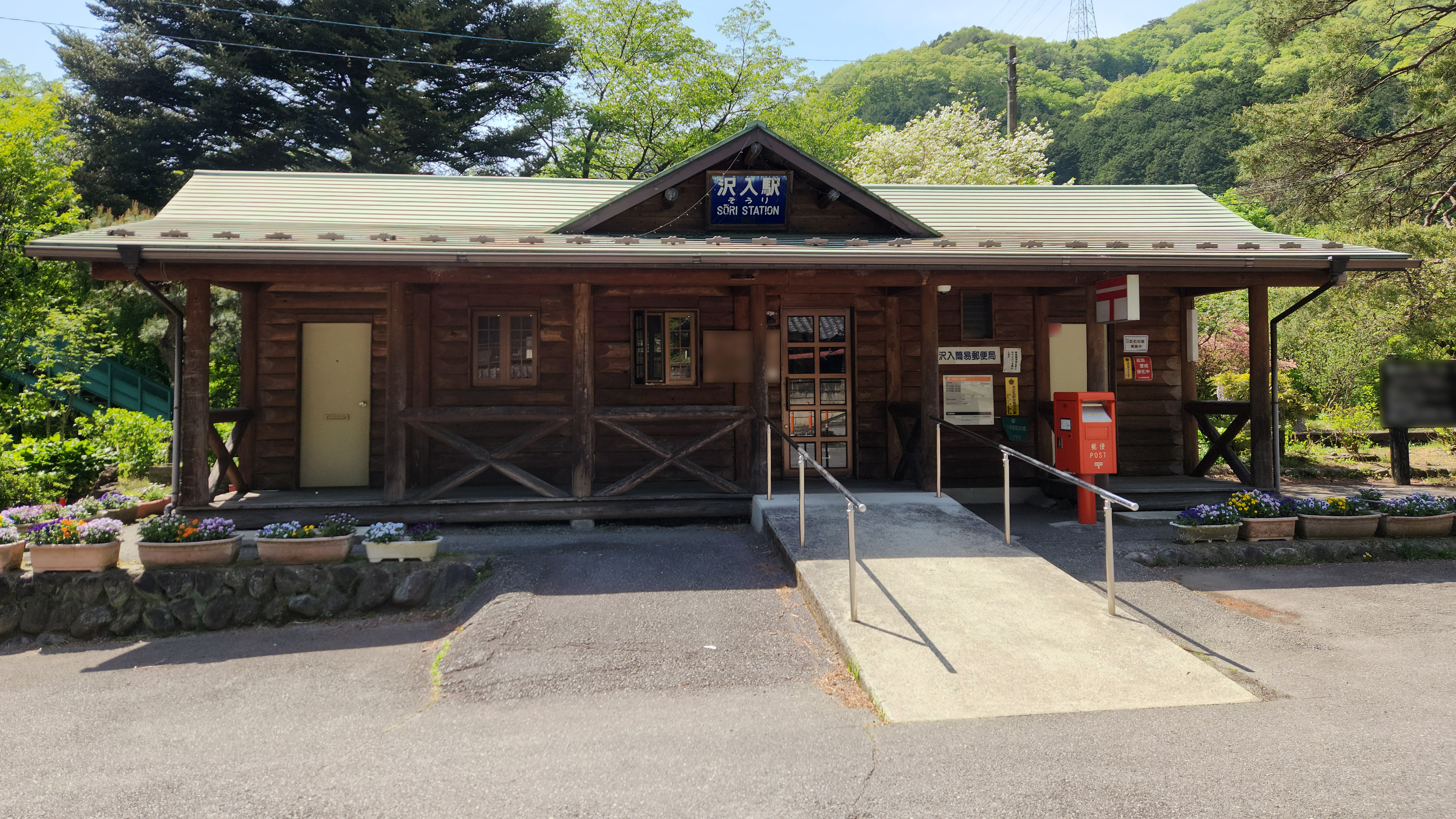
- Sōri Station, May 2025

General information
- Location: Azuma-cho Sōri 962, Midori-shi, Gunma-ken 376-0301; Japan
- Coordinates: 36.5806°N 139.3961°E
- Operator: Watarase Keikoku Railway
- Line: Watarase Keikoku Line
- Distance: 33.4 km from Kiryū
- Platforms: 2 side platforms

Other information
- Status: Unstaffed
- Station code: WK13
- Website: Official website

History
- Opened: 31 December 1912

Passengers
- FY2015: 39

Services
Preceding station	Watarase Keikoku Railway	Following station
Gōdo WK12 towards Aioi	Watarase Keikoku Line Watarase Keikoku-gō	Tsūdō WK15 towards Ashio
Gōdo WK12 towards Kiryū	Watarase Keikoku Line	Haramukō WK14 towards Matō
Location
- Location within Gunma Prefecture Location within Japan

Sōri Station (沢入駅, Sōri-eki) is a passenger railway station in the city of Midori, Gunma, Japan, operated by the third sector railway company Watarase Keikoku Railway.

== Lines ==
Sōri Station is a station on the Watarase Keikoku Line and is 33.4 kilometers from the terminus of the line at Kiryū.

== Station layout ==
The station has two opposed side platforms connected by a level crossing. The station building also doubles as the local post office.

== History ==
Sōri Station opened on 31 December 1912 as a station on the Ashio Railway. The station building and platform and waiting room were registered by the national government as a national Tangible Cultural Property in 2008.

== Surrounding area ==
- Sōri Post Office
- Sōri International Soccer School

== See also ==
- List of railway stations in Japan
