= Kamikambai Station =

Railway station in Midori, Gunma Prefecture, Japan

WK06 Kamikambai Station 上神梅駅
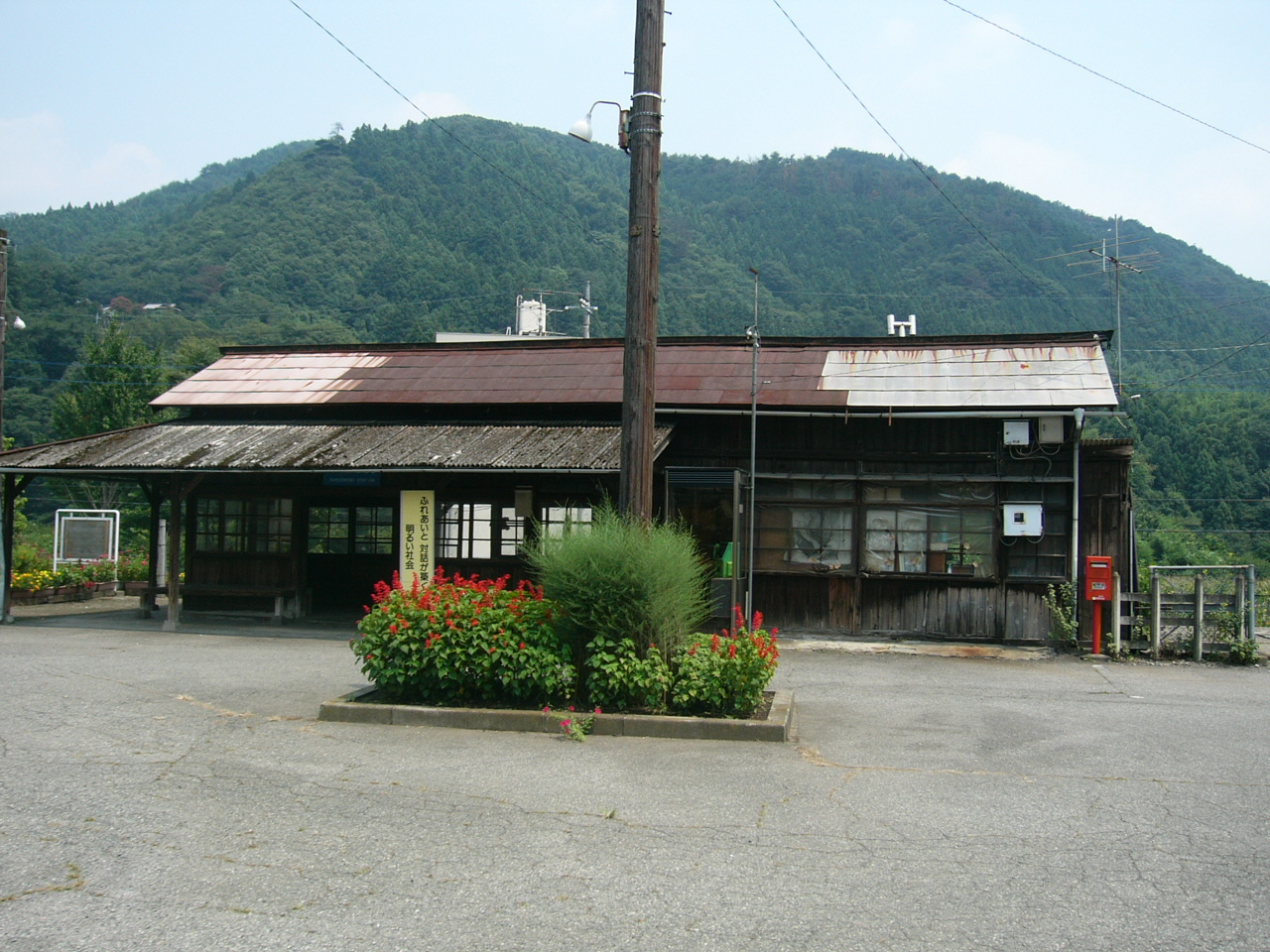
- Kamikambai Station, August 2004

General information
- Location: Ōmama-cho Kamikambai 245, Midori-shi, Gunma-ken 376-0104; Japan
- Coordinates: 36.4702°N 139.2576°E
- Operator: Watarase Keikoku Railway
- Line: Watarase Keikoku Line
- Distance: 12.4 km from Kiryū
- Platforms: 1 side platform

Other information
- Status: Unstaffed
- Station code: WK07
- Website: Official website

History
- Opened: 31 December 1912

Passengers
- FY2015: 40

Services
Preceding station	Watarase Keikoku Railway	Following station
Ōmama WK05 towards Kiryū	Watarase Keikoku Line	Motojuku WK07 towards Matō
Location
- Location within Gunma Prefecture Location within Japan

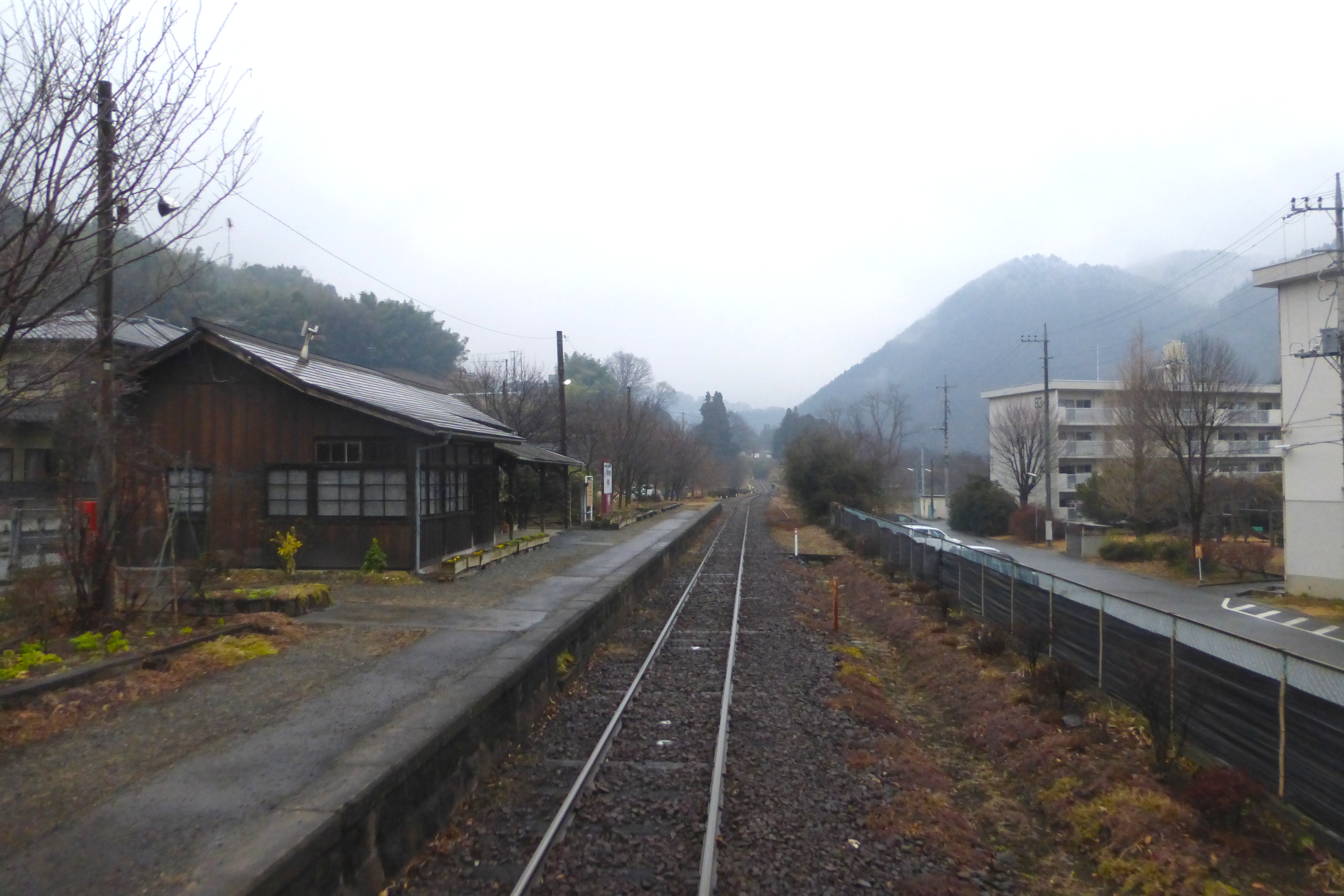
Station platforms, and station building, 2015.

Kamikambai Station (上神梅駅, Kamikambai-eki) is a passenger railway station in the city of Midori, Gunma, Japan, operated by the third sector railway company Watarase Keikoku Railway.

== Lines ==
Kamikambai Station is a station on the Watarase Keikoku Line and is 12.4 kilometers from the terminus of the line at Kiryū.

== Station layout ==
The station consists of a single side platform serving traffic in both directions. The station is unattended.

== History ==
Kamikambai Station opened on 31 December 1912 as a station on the Ashio Railway. The station building and platform were registered by the national government as a national Tangible Cultural Property in 2008.

== Surrounding area ==
- Midori city Kambai Elementary School
- Kifune Jinja
- National Route 122

== See also ==
- List of railway stations in Japan
