= Hanawa Station =

Railway station in Midori, Gunma Prefecture, Japan

WK09 Hanawa Station 花輪駅
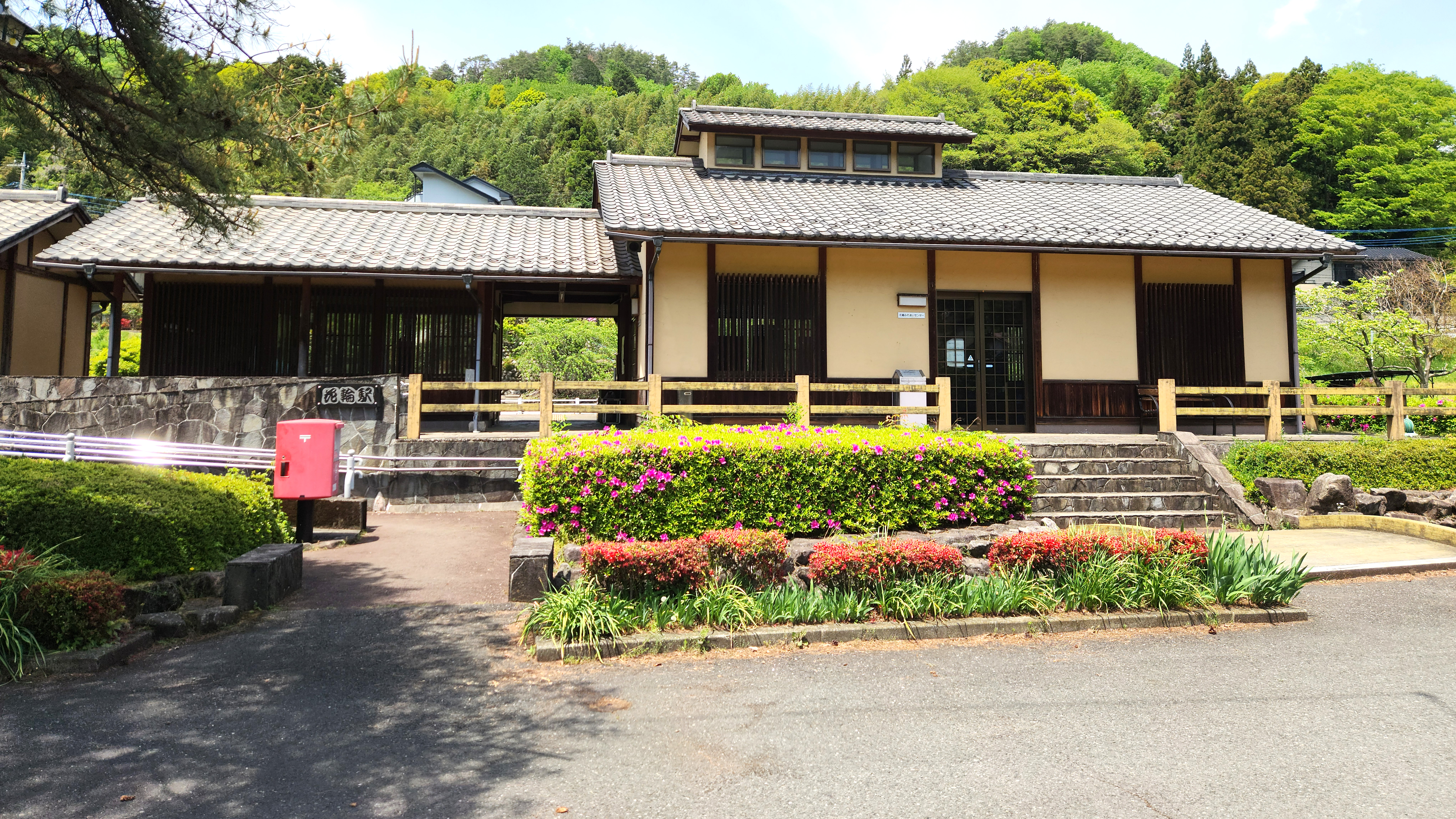
- Hanawa Station, May 2025

General information
- Location: 99 Hanawa, Higashimachi, Midori City, Gunma Prefecture 376-0307; Japan
- Coordinates: 36.5206°N 139.3079°E
- Operator: Watarase Keikoku Railway
- Line: Watarase Keikoku Line
- Distance: 21.0 km (13.0 mi) from Kiryū
- Platforms: 1 side platform
- Tracks: 1

Construction
- Structure type: At grade

Other information
- Status: Unstaffed
- Station code: WK09
- Website: Official website

History
- Opened: 31 December 1912; 113 years ago

Passengers
- FY2018: 53 daily

Services
Preceding station	Watarase Keikoku Railway	Following station
Mizunuma WK08 towards Kiryū	Watarase Keikoku Line	Nakano WK10 towards Matō
Location
- Location within Gunma Prefecture Location within Kanto Area Location within Japan

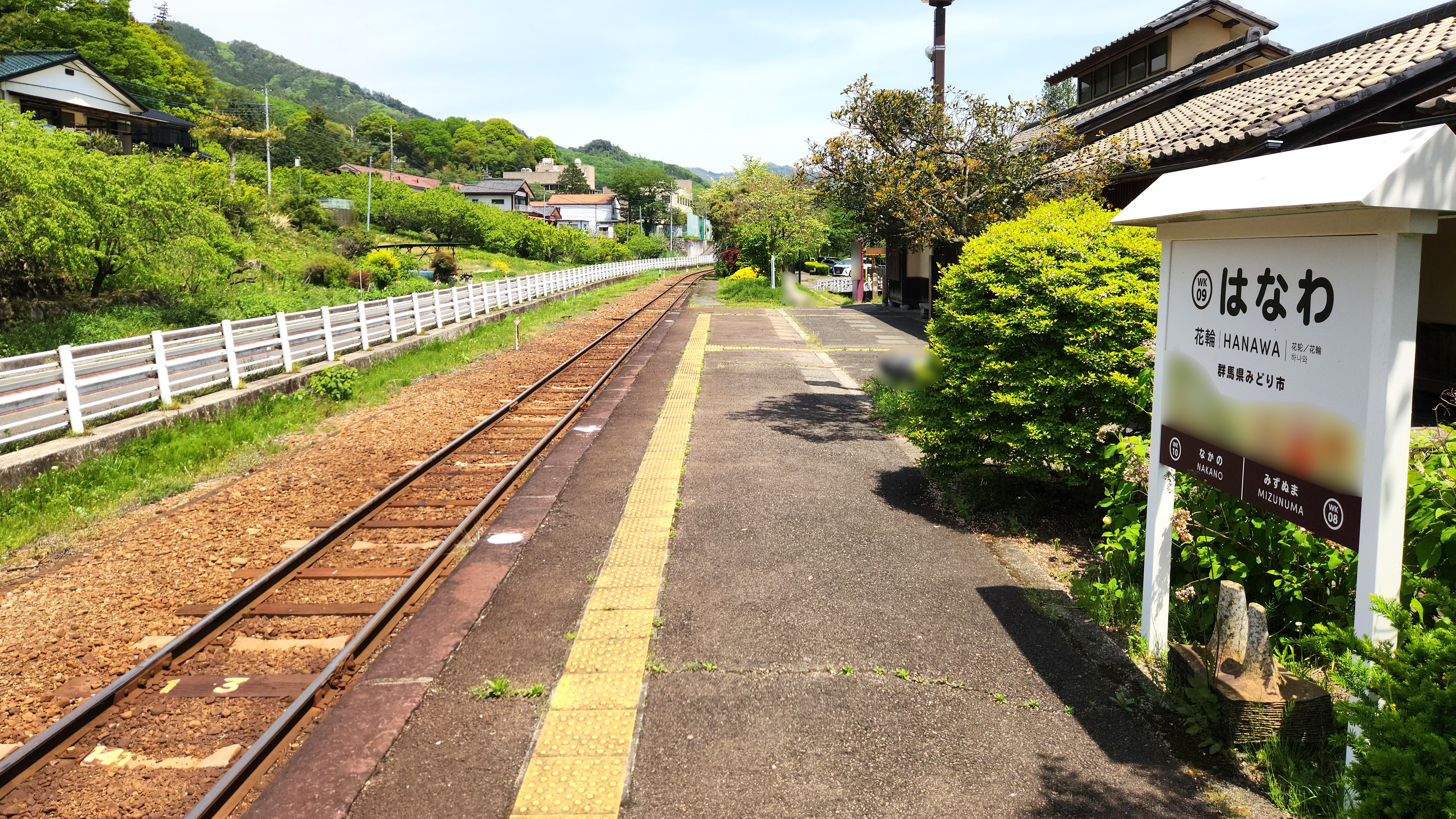
Station platform, 2025.

Hanawa Station (花輪駅, Hanawa-eki) is a passenger railway station in the city of Midori, Gunma, Japan, operated by the third sector railway company Watarase Keikoku Railway.

== Lines ==
Hanawa Station is a station on the Watarase Keikoku Line and is 21.0 kilometres (13.0 mi) from the terminus of the line at Kiryū.

== Station layout ==
The station has a single island platform, of which only one side is used, making it effectively a single side platform station. The station is unattended.

== History ==
Hanawa Station opened, as a station on the Ashio Railway, on 31 December 1912.

== Surrounding area ==
- Former Azuma Village Hall
- Hanawa Post Office
- National Route 122

== See also ==
- List of railway stations in Japan
