= Ōmama Station =

Railway station in Midori, Gunma Prefecture, Japan

WK05 Ōmama Station 大間々駅
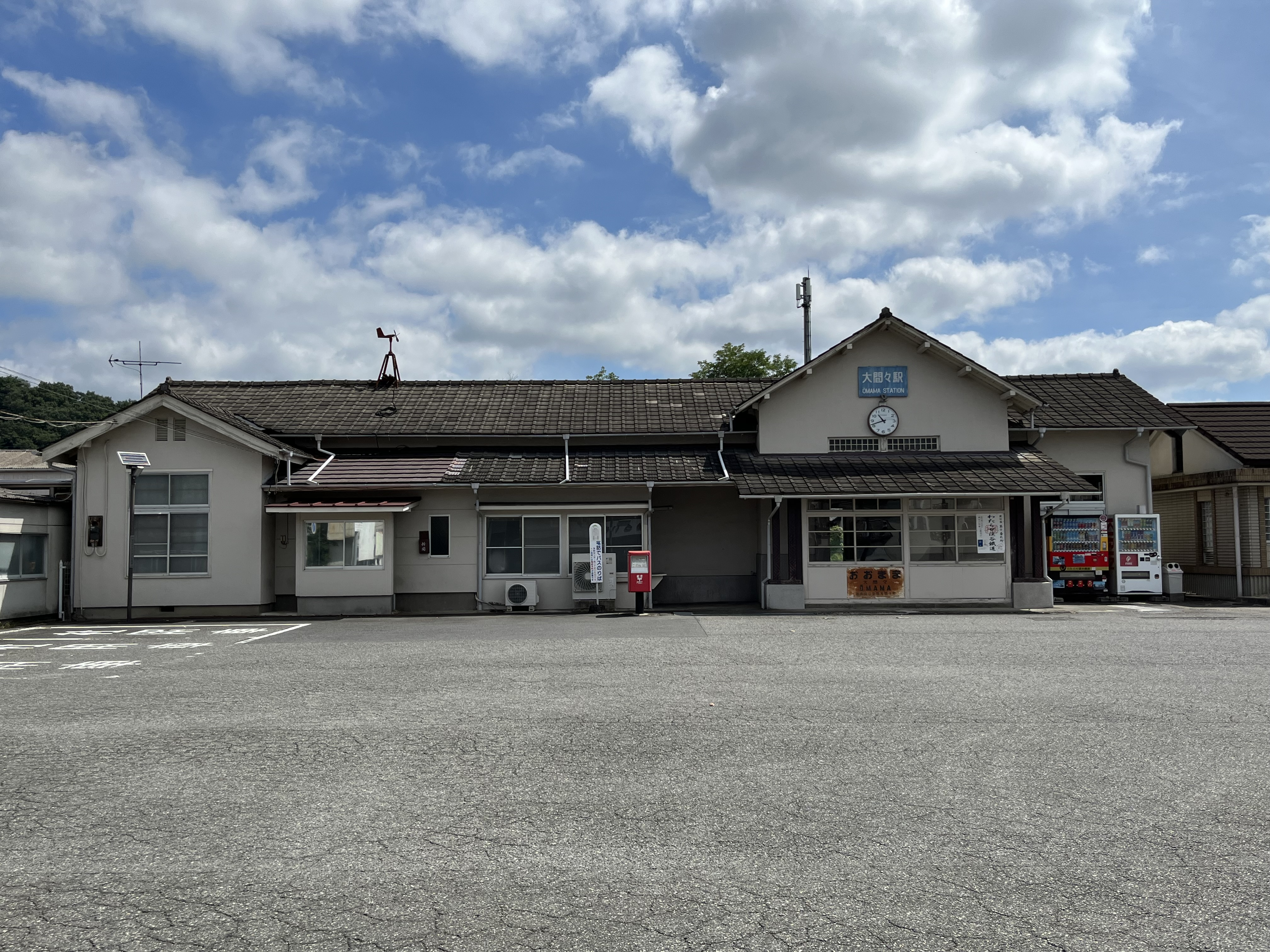
- Ōmama Station, August 2023

General information
- Location: 1375 Ōmama, Midori-shi, Gunma-ken 376-0101; Japan
- Coordinates: 36.4347°N 139.2776°E
- Operator: Watarase Keikoku Railway
- Line: Watarase Keikoku Line
- Distance: 7.3 km from Kiryū
- Platforms: 2 side + 2 bay platforms

Other information
- Status: Unstaffed
- Station code: WK05
- Website: Official website

History
- Opened: 15 April 1911

Passengers
- FY2015: 448

Services
Preceding station	Watarase Keikoku Railway	Following station
Aioi WK03 Terminus	Watarase Keikoku Line Watarase Keikoku-gō	Mizunuma WK08 towards Ashio
Undō-Kōen WK05 towards Kiryū	Watarase Keikoku Line	Kamikambai WK06 towards Matō
Location
- Location within Gunma Prefecture Location within Japan

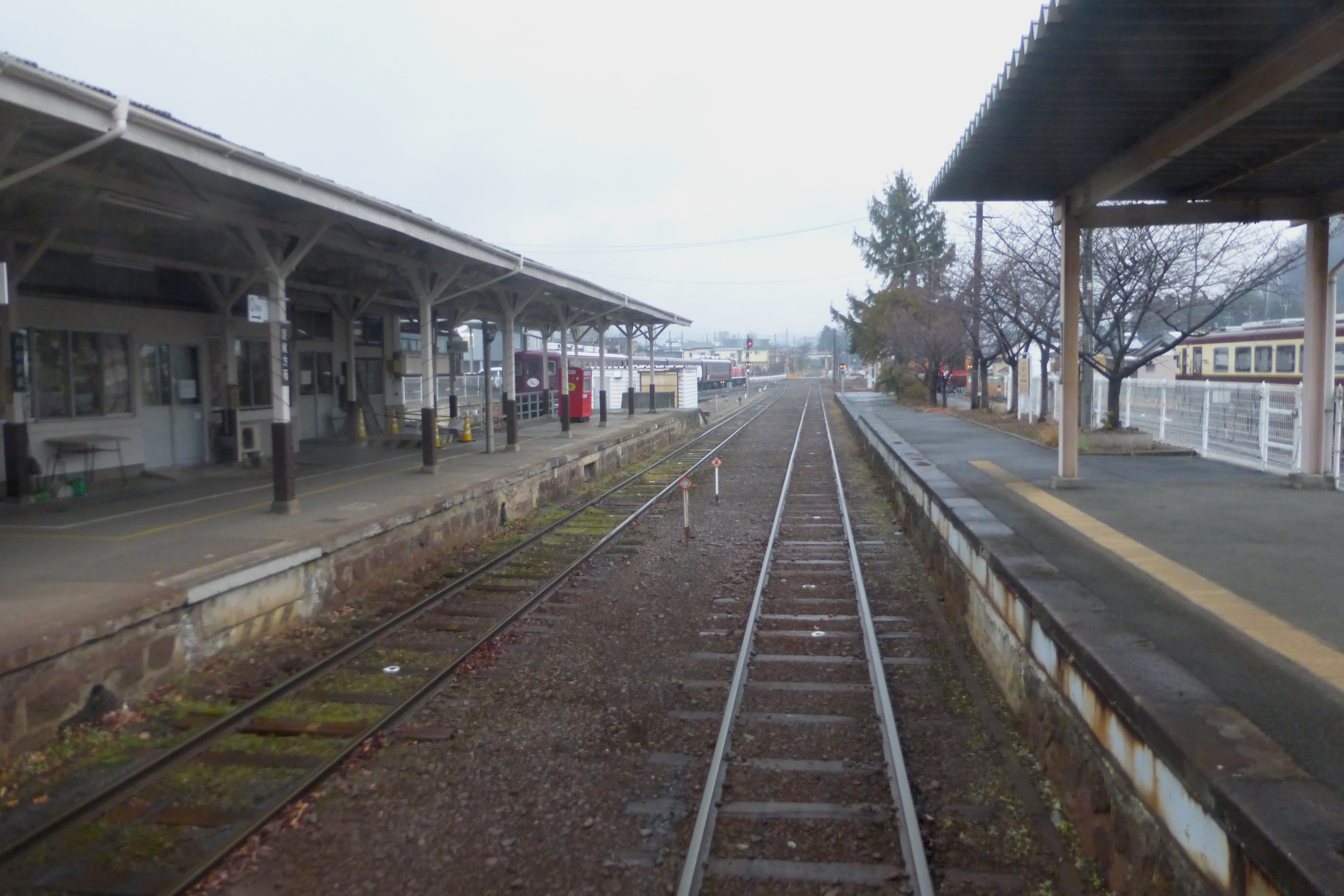
The station platforms in 2015

Ōmama Station (大間々駅, Ōmama-eki) is a passenger railway station in the city of Midori, Gunma, Japan, operated by the third sector railway company Watarase Keikoku Railway.

== Lines ==
Ōmama Station is a station on the Watarase Keikoku Line and is 7.3 kilometers from the terminus of the line at Kiryū.

== Station layout ==
The station has a two opposed side platforms, and one bay platform which is used as the starting point of the seasonal open car tourist trains departing for the Watarase Gorge.

== History ==
Ōmama Station opened on 15 April 1911 as Ōmama-machi Station (大間々町駅, Ōmamamachi-eki) on the Ashio Railway. It was renamed to its present name on 1 December 1912. The station building and platform were registered by the national government as a national Tangible Cultural Property in 2008.

== Surrounding area ==
- former Ōmama Town Hall
- Ōmama Post Office
- National Route 122

== See also ==
- List of railway stations in Japan
