= Motojuku Station =

Motojuku Station may refer to these train stations in Japan:

- Motojuku Station (Aichi), in Aichi Prefecture
- Motojuku Station (Gunma), in Gunma Prefecture
