= Motojuku Station (Gunma) =

Railway station in Kiryū, Gunma Prefecture, Japan

WK07 Motojuku Station 本宿駅
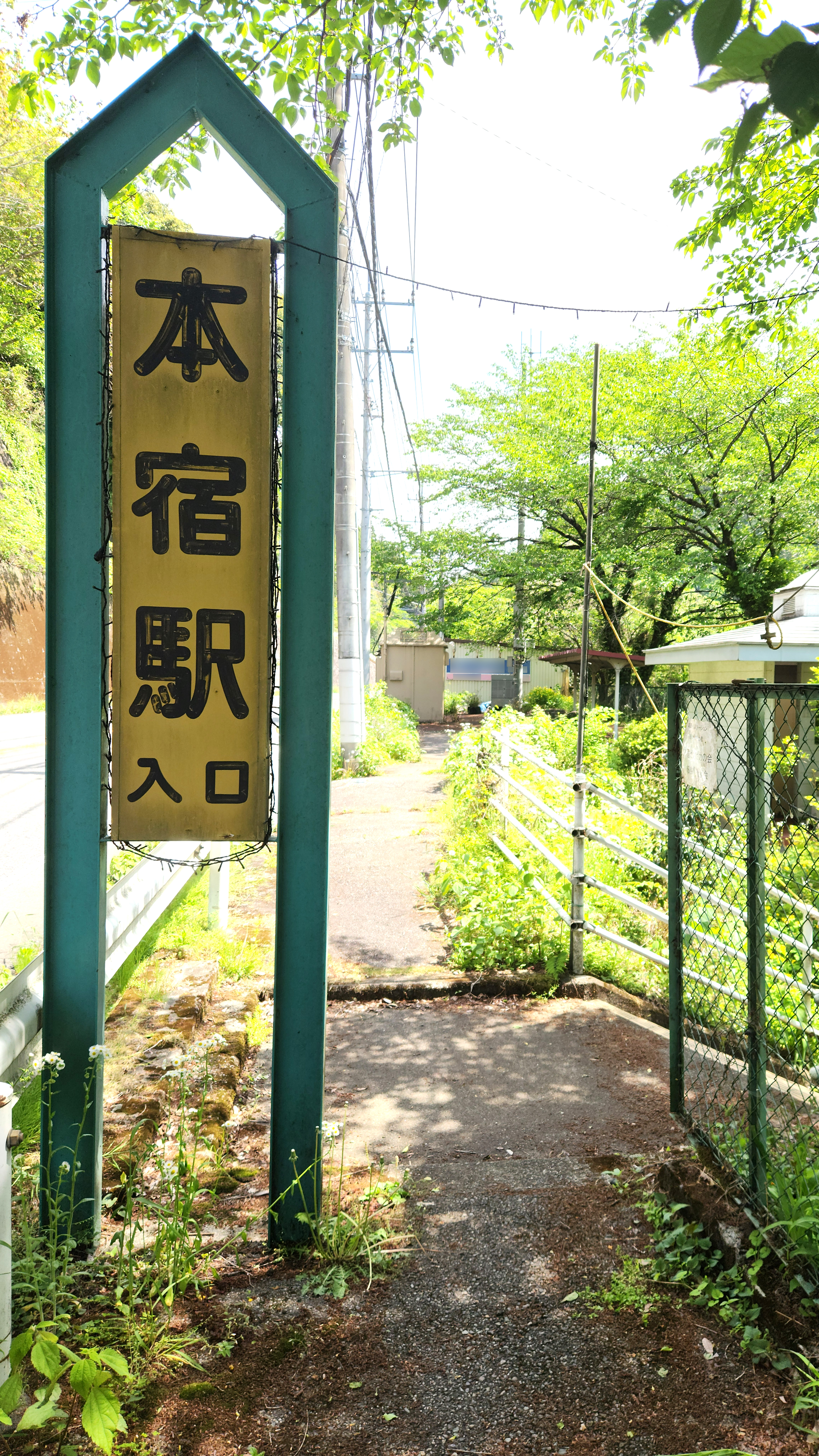
- Motojuku Station, May 2025

General information
- Location: Kurohone-cho Shukumeguri 1037-5, Kiryū-shi, Gunma-ken 376-0143; Japan
- Coordinates: 36°28′54″N 139°15′33″E
- Operator: Watarase Keikoku Railway
- Line: Watarase Keikoku Line
- Distance: 16.9 km (10.5 mi) from Kiryū
- Platforms: 1 side platform
- Tracks: 1

Construction
- Structure type: At grade

Other information
- Status: Unstaffed
- Station code: WK07
- Website: Official website

History
- Opened: 29 March 1989; 37 years ago

Passengers
- FY2019: 24

Services
Preceding station	Watarase Keikoku Railway	Following station
Kami-Kambai WK06 towards Kiryū	Watarase Keikoku Line	Mizunuma WK08 towards Matō
Location
- Location within Gunma Prefecture Location within Kanto Area Location within Japan

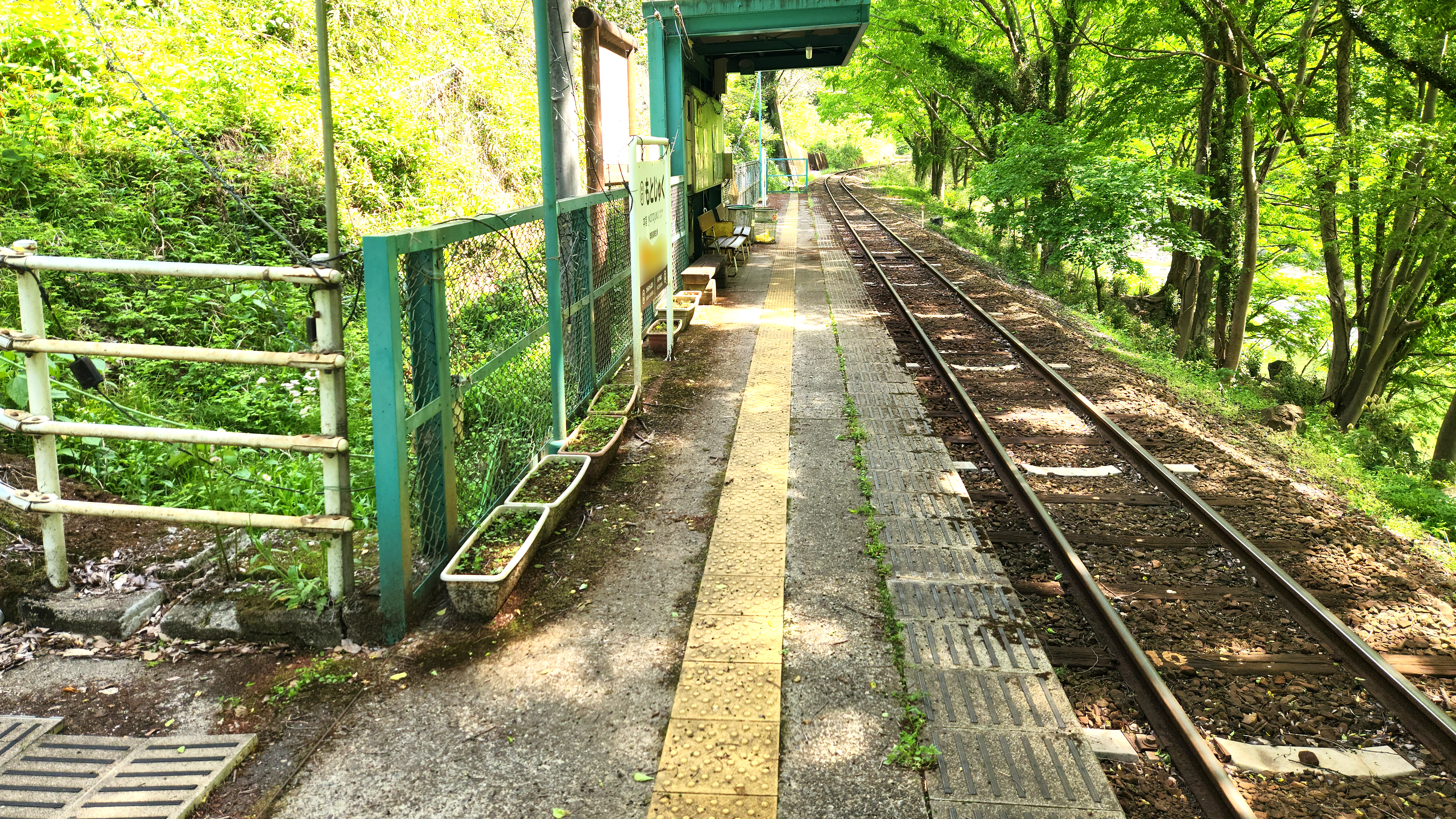
Station platform and waiting area, 2025.

Motojuku Station (本宿駅, Motojuku-eki) is a passenger railway station in the city of Kiryū, Gunma, Japan, operated by the third sector railway company Watarase Keikoku Railway.

== Lines ==
Motojuku Station is a station on the Watarase Keikoku Line and is 13.8 kilometers from the terminus of the line at Kiryū.

== Station layout ==
The station consists of a single side platform serving traffic in both directions. There is no station building, but only an open-sided shelter on the platform itself. The station is unattended.

== History ==
Motojuku Station opened on 29 March 1989.

== Passenger statistics ==
In fiscal 2019, the station was used by an average of 24 passengers daily (boarding passengers only).

== Surrounding area ==
- Nashiki onsen
- National Route 122

== See also ==
- List of railway stations in Japan
