= Watarase Keikoku Line =

Railway line in Gunma and Tochigi prefectures, Japan

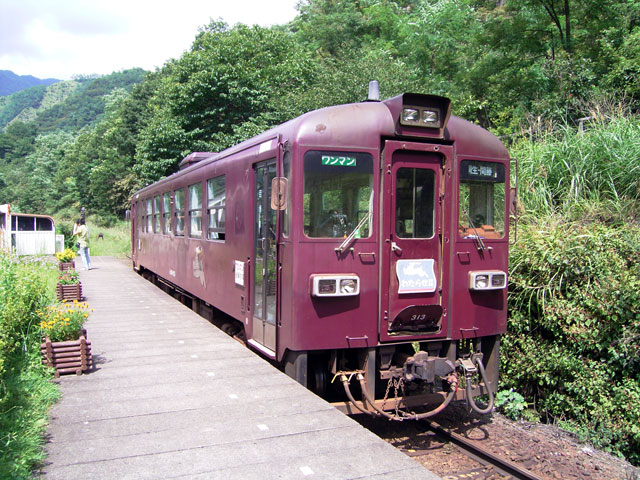
- Watarase Keikoku Railway Wa 89-313 train.

Overview
- Native name: わたらせ渓谷線
- Termini: Kiryū; Matō
- Stations: 17

History
- Opened: 15 April 1911; 114 years ago

Technical
- Line length: 44.1 km (27.4 mi)
- Number of tracks: 1
- Track gauge: 1,067 mm (3 ft 6 in)
- Operating speed: 75 km/h (47 mph) (Maximum)
- Train protection system: ATS-P; ATS-S N

The Watarase Keikoku Line (わたらせ渓谷線, Watarase Keikoku-sen) is a Japanese railway line connecting Kiryū Station in Kiryū, Gunma and Matō Station in Nikkō, Tochigi. This is the only railway line that the third-sector company Watarase Keikoku Railway (わたらせ渓谷鐵道, Watarase Keikoku Tetsudō) operates. The company and line are also known as Watakei (わた渓) or Watetsu (わ鐵). The company acquired the line from the East Japan Railway Company (JR East) in 1989. As the name suggests, the line runs along the Watarase River through a deep valley.

== History ==
The Ashio Railway Co. opened the line to Ashio-Motoyama (2 kilometres or 1.2 miles beyond Mato) in 1911–12 to service the Ashio Copper Mine, and leased the line to JNR in 1913. Passenger services were introduced in 1914. In 1918 the line was nationalised.

The copper mine closed in 1973, the same year the line was deviated for the construction of the Kusaki Dam, including the 5,242-metre (17,198 ft) Kusaki Tunnel.

Operation of the line between Kiryū and Matō was transferred to the Watarase Keikoku Railway, a third-sector company, in 1989. Also in 1989, the Ashio-Motoyama – Mato section was closed.

== Basic data ==
- Distance: 44.1 km (27.4 mi)
- Gauge: 1,067 mm (3 ft 6 in)
- Stations: 17
- Double-tracking: None
- Electrification: None
- Railway signalling:
  - Kiryū — Shimo-Shinden: Automatic
  - Shimo-Shinden — Matō: Simplified Automatic

== Station list ==
- Trains stop at stations marked "●" and pass those marked "｜".
- Local trains stop at all stations (other than Shimo-Shinden Signal Box).

Station No.	Station	Japanese	Watarase Keikoku-gō	Transfers	Location	
WK01	Kiryū	桐生		East Japan Railway Company (JR East): Ryōmō Line; Jōmō Electric Railway: Jōmō Line (Nishi-Kiryū)	Kiryū	Gunma
WK02	Shimo-Shinden	下新田			Kiryū	Gunma
WK03	Aioi	相老	※	Tōbu Railway: Kiryū Line	Kiryū	Gunma
WK04	Undō-Kōen	運動公園	｜	Jōmō Electric Railway: Jōmō Line (Kiryū-Kyūjō-Mae)	Kiryū	Gunma
WK05	Ōmama	大間々	●	Tōbu: Kiryū Line (Akagi); Jōmō Electric Railway: Jōmō Line (Akagi)	Midori	Gunma
WK06	Kami-Kambai	上神梅	｜		Midori	Gunma
WK07	Motojuku	本宿	｜		Kiryū	Gunma
WK08	Mizunuma	水沼	●		Kiryū	Gunma
WK09	Hanawa	花輪	｜		Midori	Gunma
WK10	Nakano	中野	｜		Midori	Gunma
WK11	Konaka	小中	｜		Midori	Gunma
WK12	Gōdo	神戸	●		Midori	Gunma
WK13	Sōri	沢入	●		Midori	Gunma
WK14	Haramukō	原向	｜		Nikkō	Tochigi
WK15	Tsūdō	通洞	●		Nikkō	Tochigi
WK16	Ashio	足尾	●		Nikkō	Tochigi
WK17	Matō	間藤			Nikkō	Tochigi
