= Aioi Station (Gunma) =

Railway station in Kiryū, Gunma Prefecture, Japan

TI56 WK03 Aioi Station 相老駅
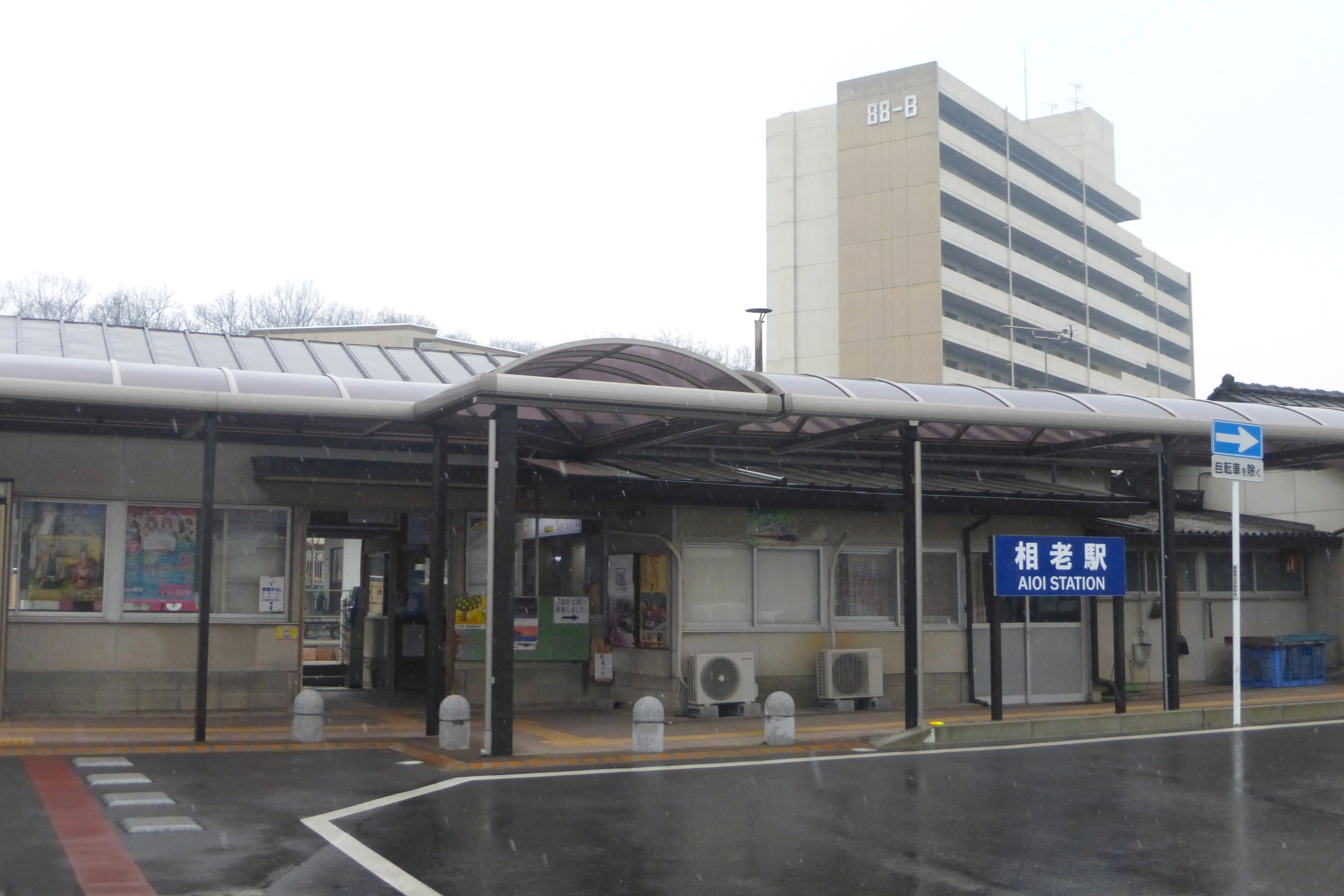
- Aioi Station building, February 2015

General information
- Location: 2-756 Aioicho, Kiryū-shi, Gunma-ken 376-0011; Japan
- Coordinates: 36.4100°N 139.3044°E
- Operator: Tōbu Railway; Watarase Keikoku Railway
- Line: Tōbu Kiryū Line Watarase Keikoku Line
- Distance: 16.9 km from Ōta

Other information
- Status: Staffed
- Station code: TI-56, WK04
- Website: Official website

History
- Opened: 15 April 1911

Passengers
- FY2019: 698

Services
Preceding station	Tobu Railway	Following station
Shin-Kiryū TI55 towards Asakusa	Ryomo	Akagi TI57 Terminus
Shin-Kiryū TI55 towards Ōta	Kiryū Line	Akagi TI57 Terminus
Preceding station	Watarase Keikoku Railway	Following station
Terminus	Watarase Keikoku Line Watarase Keikoku-gō	Ōmama WK05 towards Ashio
Shimo-Shinden WK02 towards Kiryū	Watarase Keikoku Line	Undō-Kōen WK04 towards Matō
Location
- Location within Gunma Prefecture Location within Japan

Aioi Station (相老駅, Aioi-eki) is a junction passenger railway station in the city of Kiryū, Gunma, Japan, operated by the private railway operator Tōbu Railway and the third sector Watarase Keikoku Railway.

== Lines ==
Aioi Station is a station on the Tōbu Kiryū Line, and is located 16.9 kilometers from the starting point of the line at Ōta. It is also 3.1 kilometers grin the terminal of the Watarase Keikoku Railway Watarase Keikoku Line at Kiryū.

== Station layout ==
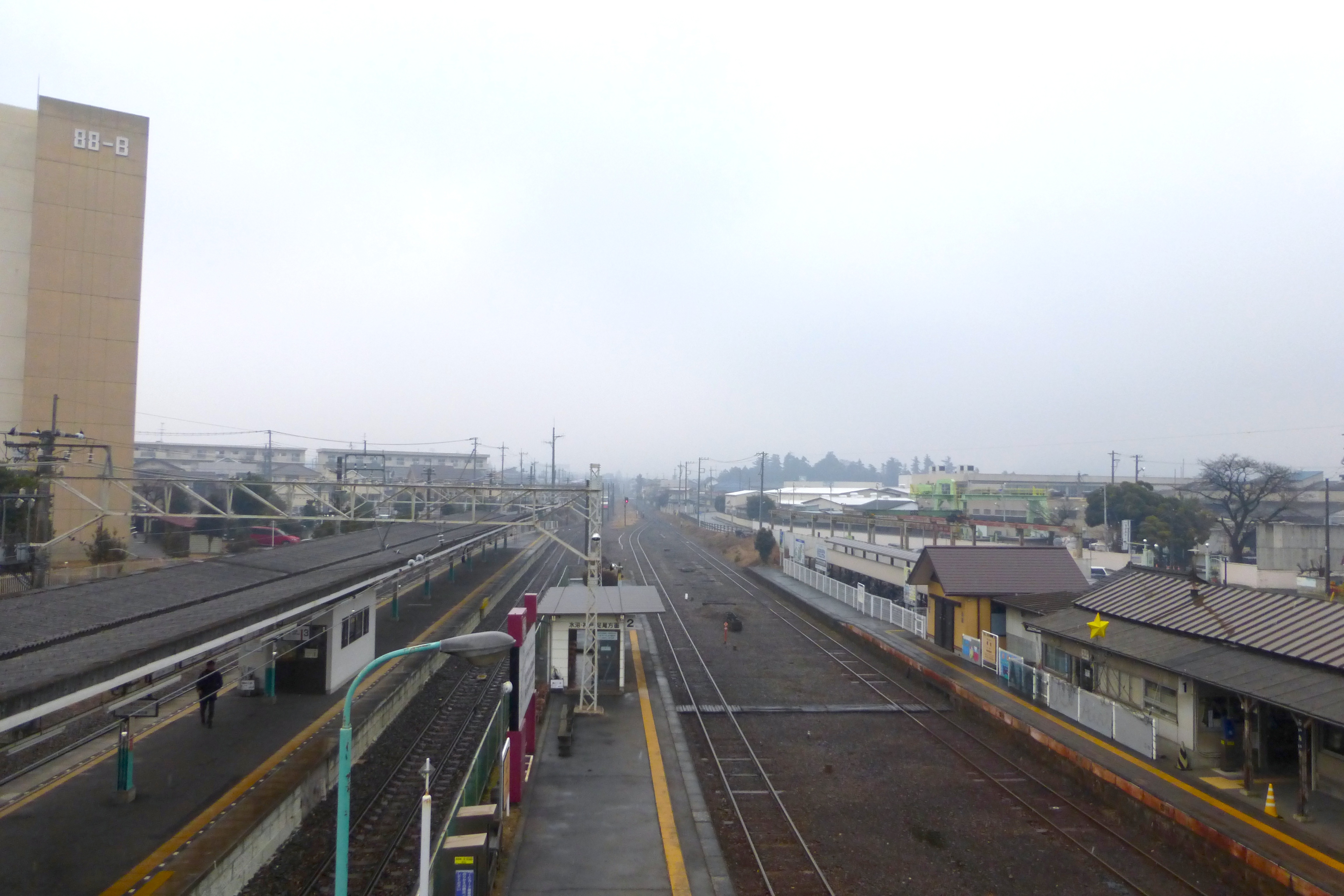
Overview of the station, with the Tobu Kiryu Line platforms on the left and the Watarase Keikoku Railway platforms on the right, February 2015

Aioi Station has two opposed side platforms for the Watarase Keikoku Railway and one island platform for the Tōbu Railway, with both sets of platforms connected to the station building by a footbridge. Both companies share the same set of ticket barriers.

=== Platforms ===
1	■ Watarase Keikoku Line	for Kiryū
2	■ Watarase Keikoku Line	for Ōmama and Ashio
3	■ Tōbu Kiryū Line	for Ōta
4	■ Tōbu Kiryū Line	for Akagi

== History ==
Aioi Station opened on the Ashio Line on 15 April 1911, with the name written using the kanji characters (相生). The kanji characters were changed to the present name on 1 July 1913.

From 17 March 2012, station numbering was introduced on all Tōbu lines, with Aioi Station becoming "TI-56".

== Passenger statistics ==
In fiscal 2019, the station was used by an average of 698 passengers daily (boarding passengers only).

== Surrounding area ==
- Kiryū Aioi Post Office
- National Route 122

== See also ==
- List of railway stations in Japan
