= Ashio Station =

Railway station in Nikkō, Tochigi Prefecture, Japan

WK16 Ashio Station 足尾駅
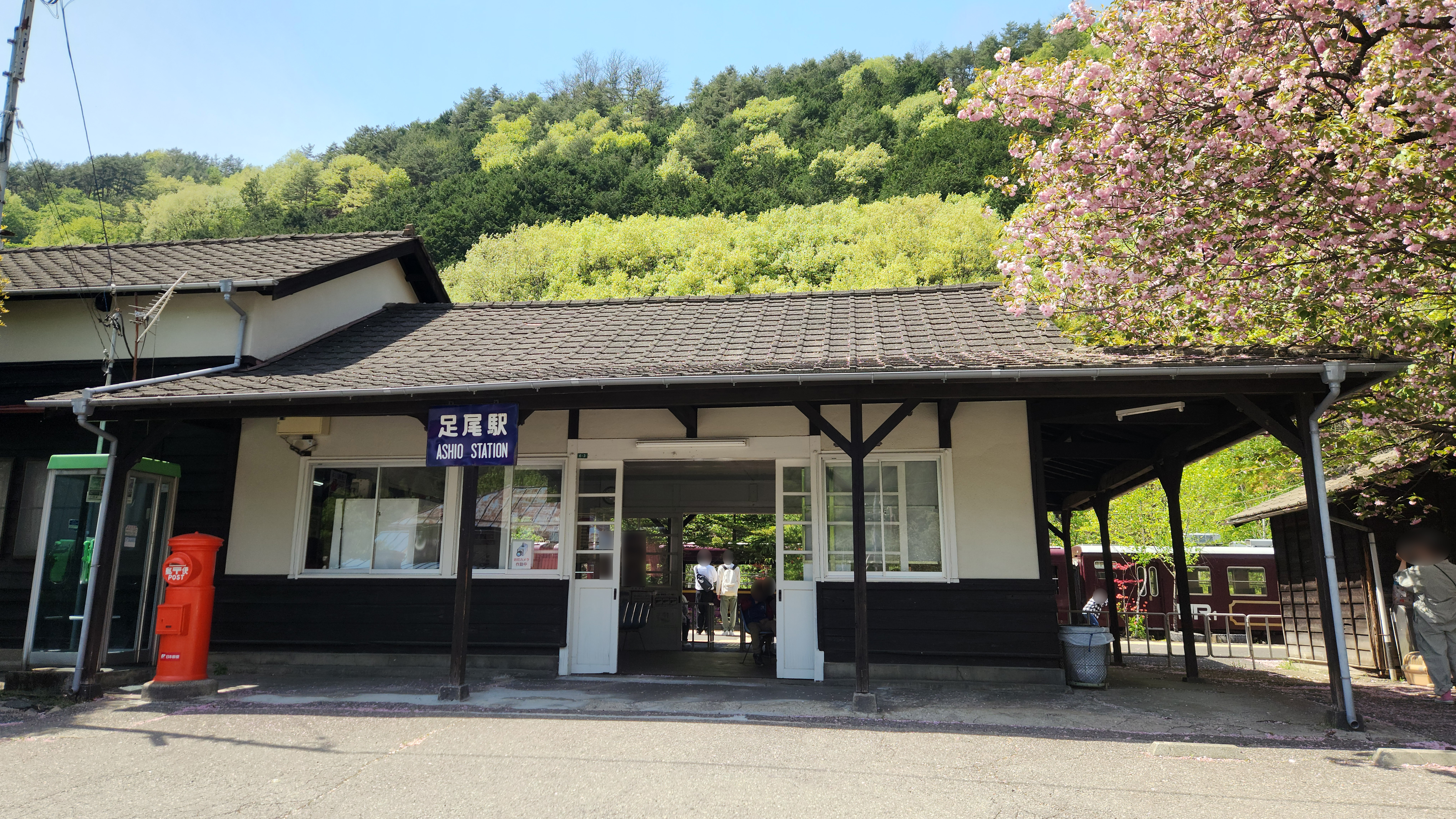
- Ashio Station on May 2025

General information
- Location: Ashio-machi Kakemizu 6, Nikkō-shi, Tochigi-ken 321-1512; Japan
- Coordinates: 36.6418°N 139.4477°E
- Operator: Watarase Keikoku Railway
- Line: Watarase Keikoku Line
- Distance: 42.8 km from Kiryū
- Platforms: 2 side platforms

Other information
- Station code: WK16
- Website: Official website

History
- Opened: 31 December 1912

Passengers
- FY2015: 50 daily

Services
Preceding station	Watarase Keikoku Railway	Following station
Tsūdō WK15 towards Aioi	Watarase Keikoku Line Watarase Keikoku-gō	Terminus
Tsūdō WK15 towards Kiryū	Watarase Keikoku Line	Matō WK17 Terminus
Location
- Location within Tochigi Prefecture Location within Japan

Ashio Station (足尾駅, Ashio-eki) is a railway station in the city of Nikkō, Tochigi Prefecture, Japan, operated by the third-sector railway company Watarase Keikoku Railway.

== Lines ==
Ashio Station is a station on the Watarase Keikoku Line and is 42.8 kilometers from the terminus of the line at Kiryū.

== Station layout ==
The station has a two opposed side platforms connected to the station building by a level crossing.

=== Platforms ===
1	■ Watarase Keikoku Line	for Kiryū
2	■ Watarase Keikoku Line	for Matō

== History ==
Ashio Station opened on 31 December 1912 as a station on the Ashio Railway. In 2009, many of the structures of Ashio Station were granted protection as national Registered Tangible Cultural Properties. These include the station building and adjacent platform, the opposing platform, Baggage Storage Shed Dangerous Goods Shed and Freight Depot with freight platform.

== Surrounding area ==
- Ashio Copper Mine
- National Route 122

== See also ==
- List of railway stations in Japan
