= Matō Station =

Railway station in Nikkō, Tochigi Prefecture, Japan

WK17 Matō Station 間藤駅
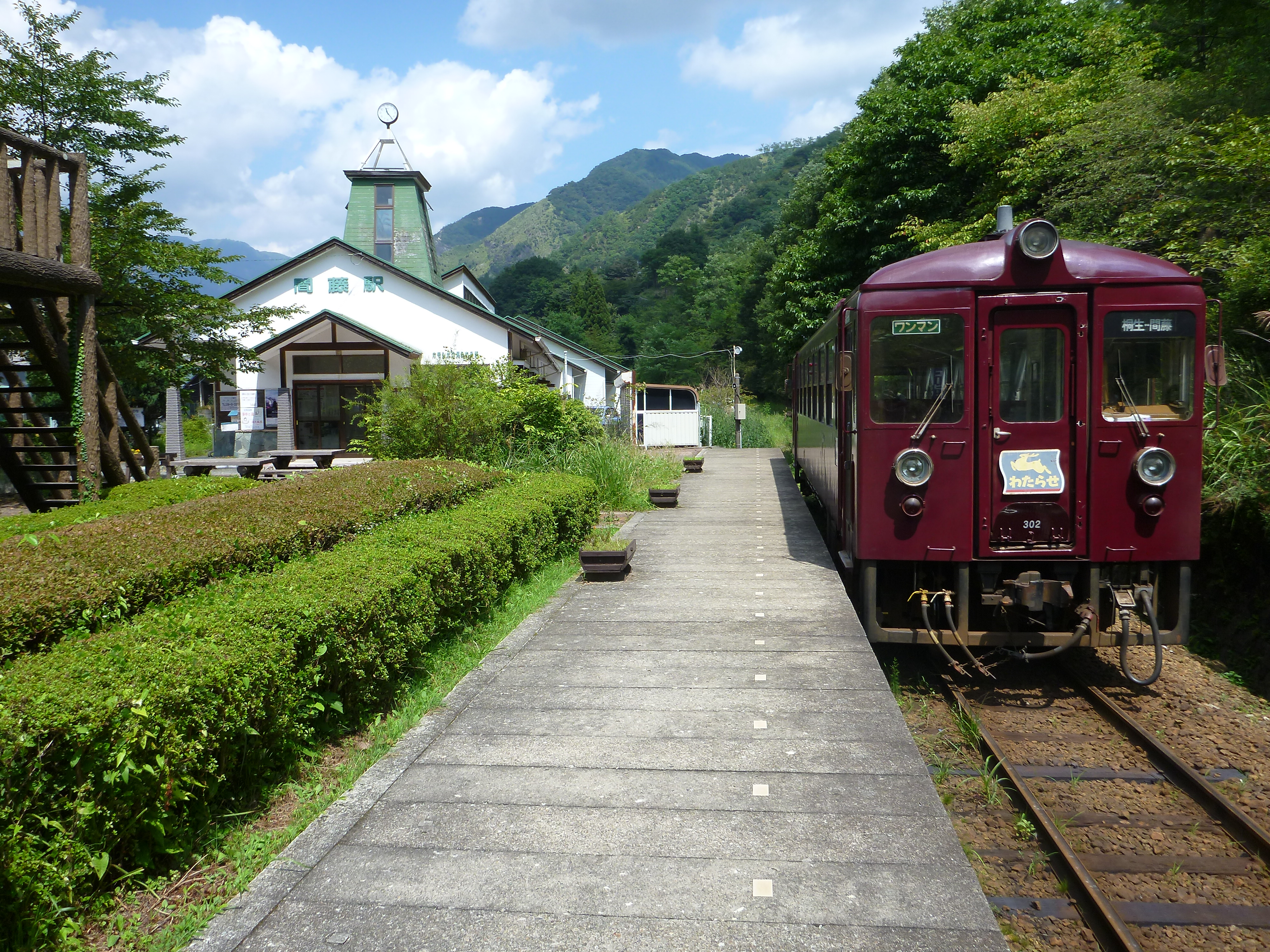
- Matō Station, August 2013

General information
- Location: 2 Ashio-machi Shimo-Matō, Nikkō-shi, Tochigi-ken 321-1506; Japan
- Coordinates: 36.6537°N 139.4498°E
- Operator: Watarase Keikoku Railway
- Line: Watarase Keikoku Line
- Distance: 44.1 km from Kiryū
- Platforms: 1 side platform

Other information
- Station code: WK17
- Website: Official website

History
- Opened: 1 November 1914

Passengers
- FY2015: 184 daily

Services
Preceding station	Watarase Keikoku Railway	Following station
Ashio WK16 towards Kiryū	Watarase Keikoku Line	Terminus
Location
- Location within Tochigi Prefecture Location within Japan

Matō Station (間藤駅, Matō-eki) is a railway station on the Watarase Keikoku Line in the city of Nikkō, Tochigi, Japan, operated by the third-sector railway operator Watarase Keikoku Railway.

== Lines ==
Matō Station is a terminal station on the Watarase Keikoku Line and is 44.1 kilometers from the opposing terminus of the line at Kiryū.

== Station layout ==
The station has a single side platform.

== History ==
Matō Station opened on 1 November 1914 as a station on the Ashio Railway.

== Surrounding area ==
- Ashio Akakura Post Office
- Ashio Copper Mine
- National Route 122

== See also ==
- List of railway stations in Japan
