= Japan National Route 122 =

National highway in Japan

National Route 122
- 国道122号
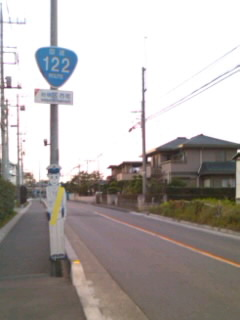

Route information
- Length: 158.4 km (98.4 mi)
- Existed: 1963–present

Major junctions
- North end: National Route 120 in Nikkō
- South end: National Route 17 in Toshima, Tokyo

Location
- Country: Japan

Highway system
- National highways of Japan; Expressways of Japan
← National Route 121	→ National Route 123

National Route 122 is a national highway of Japan connecting Nikkō, Tochigi and Toshima, Tokyo in Japan, with a total length of 158.3 km (98.4 mi).

== Route description ==
A section of National Route 122 in Midori in Gunma Prefecture is a musical road.

== History ==
Route 122 was originally designated on 18 May 1953 from Maebashi to Mito. This was redesignated as Route 50 on 1 April 1963 and the current Route 122 was designated the same day.
