= My Next Life as a Villainess: All Routes Lead to Doom! The Movie =

2023 Japanese animated film by Keisuke Inoue

- Theatrical release poster
- Kanji: 劇場版 乙女ゲームの破滅フラグしかない悪役令嬢に転生してしまった…
- Revised Hepburn: Gekijōban Otome Gēmu no Hametsu Furagu Shika Nai Akuyaku Reijō ni Tensei Shite Shimatta…
- Directed by: Keisuke Inoue
- Screenplay by: Megumi Shimizu; Megumu Sasano
- Story by: Satoru Yamaguchi
- Based on: My Next Life as a Villainess: All Routes Lead to Doom! by Satoru Yamaguchi
- Starring: Maaya Uchida; Shouta Aoi; Tetsuya Kakihara; Tatsuhisa Suzuki; Yoshitsugu Matsuoka; Miho Okasaki; Inori Minase; Saori Hayami; Kensho Ono; Ayumu Murase; Akari Kitō; Reina Ueda; Yoko Hikasa; Rie Kugimiya
- Cinematography: Hideki Etō; Naoki Etō
- Edited by: Michi Takigawa
- Music by: Nichion
- Production company: Silver Link
- Distributed by: Asmik Ace
- Release dates: November 19, 2023 (New York City); December 8, 2023 (Japan)
- Running time: 90 minutes
- Country: Japan
- Language: Japanese
- Box office: ¥40 million (US$284,716)

My Next Life as a Villainess: All Routes Lead to Doom! The Movie, (Note: Japanese: 劇場版 乙女ゲームの破滅フラグしかない悪役令嬢に転生してしまった…, Hepburn: Gekijōban Otome Gēmu no Hametsu Furagu Shika Nai Akuyaku Reijō ni Tensei Shite Shimatta…) often shortened to Hamefura: The Movie, (Note: Japanese: 劇場版 はめふら, Hepburn: Gekijōban Hamefura) is a 2023 Japanese animated film based on the light novel series My Next Life as a Villainess: All Routes Lead to Doom! by Satoru Yamaguchi. Produced by Silver Link and distributed by Asmik Ace, the film is directed by Keisuke Inoue from a script written by Megumi Shimizu and Megumu Sasano, who both adapted an original story by Yamaguchi.

An anime film based on the light novel series was announced in September 2021, with Maaya Uchida reprising her role as Catarina Claes. The production of the film started in April 2022 and was completed in November 2023. Inoue, Shimizu, and Sasano were revealed to be working on the film in June 2023, along with the cast from the anime television series adaptation of the light novel returning to reprise their roles. Additional staff and cast were revealed in September 2023.

My Next Life as a Villainess: All Routes Lead to Doom! The Movie premiered in New York City on November 19, 2023, and was released in Japan on December 8. The film grossed ¥40 million in Japan.

== Premise ==
Catarina Claes meets a mysterious boy while visiting the circus caravan coming from the country of Mutrac, which leads to an unprecedented event for her.

== Voice cast ==
- Maaya Uchida as Catarina Claes
  - Uchida also voiced Pochi
- Shouta Aoi as Geordo Stuart
- Tetsuya Kakihara as Keith Claes
- Tatsuhisa Suzuki as Alan Stuart
- Yoshitsugu Matsuoka as Nicol Ascart
- Miho Okasaki as Mary Hunt
- Inori Minase as Sophia Ascart
- Saori Hayami as Maria Campbell
- Toshiki Masuda as Raphael Walt
- Azumi Waki as Anne Shelley
- Kohsuke Toriumi as Sora
- Yusuke Shirai as Ian Stuart
- Kensho Ono as Aaqil
- Ayumu Murase as Qumiit
- Akari Kitō as Nashiit
- Reina Ueda as Haati
- Yoko Hikasa as Alqus
- Rie Kugimiya as Piyo
- Takuto Yokoyama as Catarina's father

== Production ==
An anime film based on the light novel series My Next Life as a Villainess: All Routes Lead to Doom! by Satoru Yamaguchi was announced in September 2021, with its illustrator Nami Hidaka revealing the title through a celebratory illustration as Hamefura: The Movie. Maaya Uchida, who voices Catarina Claes in the anime television series adaptation of the light novel, was "surprised and happy" with the announcement. By April 2022, the official title of the film had been revealed and the production had begun. Keisuke Inoue was revealed to be directing the film at Silver Link in June 2023. Additionally, Megumi Shimizu and Megumu Sasano were announced to be writing the script based on an original story written by Yamaguchi; Shimizu was also credited for the film's composition. Miwa Oshima was also announced as the character designer. That month, Uchida, Shouta Aoi, Tetsuya Kakihara, Tatsuhisa Suzuki, Yoshitsugu Matsuoka, Miho Okasaki, Inori Minase, Saori Hayami, Toshiki Masuda, Azumi Waki, Kohsuke Toriumi, and Yusuke Shirai were set to reprise their roles from the anime series as Catarina, Geordo Stuart, Keith Claes, Alan Stuart, Nicol Ascart, Mary Hunt, Sophia Ascart, Maria Campbell, Raphael Walt, Anne Shelly, Sora, and Ian Stuart, respectively, while a new character resembling a chick named Piyo was introduced. Before reprising his role for the film, Suzuki was recast in September 2021 with Yuki Ito to voice Alan in the bonus drama CDs of the Nintendo Switch game My Next Life as a Villainess: All Routes Lead to Doom! Pirates of the Disturbance.

In September 2023, Uchida was also set to voice Pochi. That month, Kensho Ono, Ayumu Murase, Akari Kitō, Reina Ueda, Yoko Hikasa, and Rie Kugimiya also joined the cast as Aaqil, Qumiit, Nashiit, Haati, Alqus, and Piyo, respectively. Additional staff working on the film were also announced, including Asuka Komiyama as the art director, Eri Shigetomi as the color designer, Hideki Etō and Naoki Etō as cinematographers, and Michi Takigawa as the editor. The film was completed in November 2023.

== Music ==
In September 2023, a team of composers at the Japanese music publishing company Nichion was announced to be working on My Next Life as a Villainess: All Routes Lead to Doom! The Movie. The team had eight composers, namely Natsumi Tabuchi, Kanade Sakuma, Tatsuhiko Saiki, Misaki Tsuchida, Junko Nakajima, Reiko Abe, Kaho Sawada, and Miki Sakurai. That month, Angela and Aoi were set to collaborate to perform the theme song for the film titled "Harenochi Hallelujah!" (晴れのちハレルヤ！). Its single was released in Japan on December 6, 2023. Koji Fujimoto wrote and composed the insert song "The Caravan Nights' Entertainment", which was performed by Yuriko Kaida in the film.

== Marketing ==
The first teaser visual for My Next Life as a Villainess: All Routes Lead to Doom! The Movie was released in September 2021, which features Catarina doing an impression of Edvard Munch's 1893 composition The Scream. The second visual for the film was unveiled in April 2022, followed by a third one along with a teaser trailer in June 2023. The main key visual and trailer for the film were released in September 2023. The film's novel version, written by Yamaguchi and illustrated by Hidaka, was published by Ichijinsha under their Ichijinsha Bunko Iris imprint in Japan on November 20, 2023, and was given to three winners of an X (formerly Twitter) campaign during the fourth week of its theatrical run. Two "special episode" booklets were set to be given to theatergoers during the first and second weeks of the film's theatrical run. The first booklet contains a novel by Yamaguchi titled Aratana Bunka ga Tanjō Shite Shimatta… (新たな文化が誕生してしまった…; lit. 'A New Culture Has Been Born...') and a manga by Hidaka titled Min'na no Negai o Kiite Mita… (みんなの願いを聞いてみた…; lit. 'I Asked Everyone's Wishes...'). The second booklet contains a novel by Yamaguchi titled Ikoku no Odoriko Ishō o Kite Mita… (異国の踊り子衣装を着てみた…; lit. 'I Tried Wearing a Foreign Dancer Costume...') and a manga by Hidaka titled Ākiru ni Machi o An'nai Shite Mita… (アーキルに街を案内してみた…; lit. 'I Gave Aaqil a Tour of the City...').

Promotional partners for the film included the flower decoration brand Start Flowers, Keio Presso Inn, the theme park Marble Village Lockheart Castle in Gunma Prefecture, and GiGO.

== Release ==
=== Theatrical ===
My Next Life as a Villainess: All Routes Lead to Doom! The Movie had its world premiere at Anime NYC in New York City on November 19, 2023. The film was released in Japan on December 8, 2023. It would play a special video first before the screening, which features Catarina's five personalities recapping the series' story, and would have an otome game-style post-credit scene written by Shimizu that was set to change weekly. The film was screened at the Jamnime Festival in Thailand in February 2024.

=== Home media ===
My Next Life as a Villainess: All Routes Lead to Doom! The Movie was exclusively streamed on U-Next on May 1, 2024, and was distributed on other streaming services in Japan on August 1. The Blu-ray for the film, along with a CD containing character songs, was released in Japan on September 4, 2024.

== Reception ==
=== Box office ===
My Next Life as a Villainess: All Routes Lead to Doom! The Movie grossed ¥40 million (US$284,716) in Japan. Outside Japan, the film earned $10,095 in South Korea. In its opening weekend, it debuted in eleventh place at the box office ranking.

=== Critical response ===
Reuben Baron of Anime News Network graded My Next Life as a Villainess: All Routes Lead to Doom! The Movie "C+", describing the film as a "filler anime movie" which would make fans of the series wait for a third season to know the follow-up of the second season's tease about Fortune Lover II. Baron lauded the film's art and animation as among the best of the series, and the "charming" new characters, although Baron pointed out that it resulted in the regular supporting characters getting fewer moments to shine. Baron was critical of the film's conclusion, describing it as "crass and awkward".
