= Okkirikomi =

Japanese noodle dish

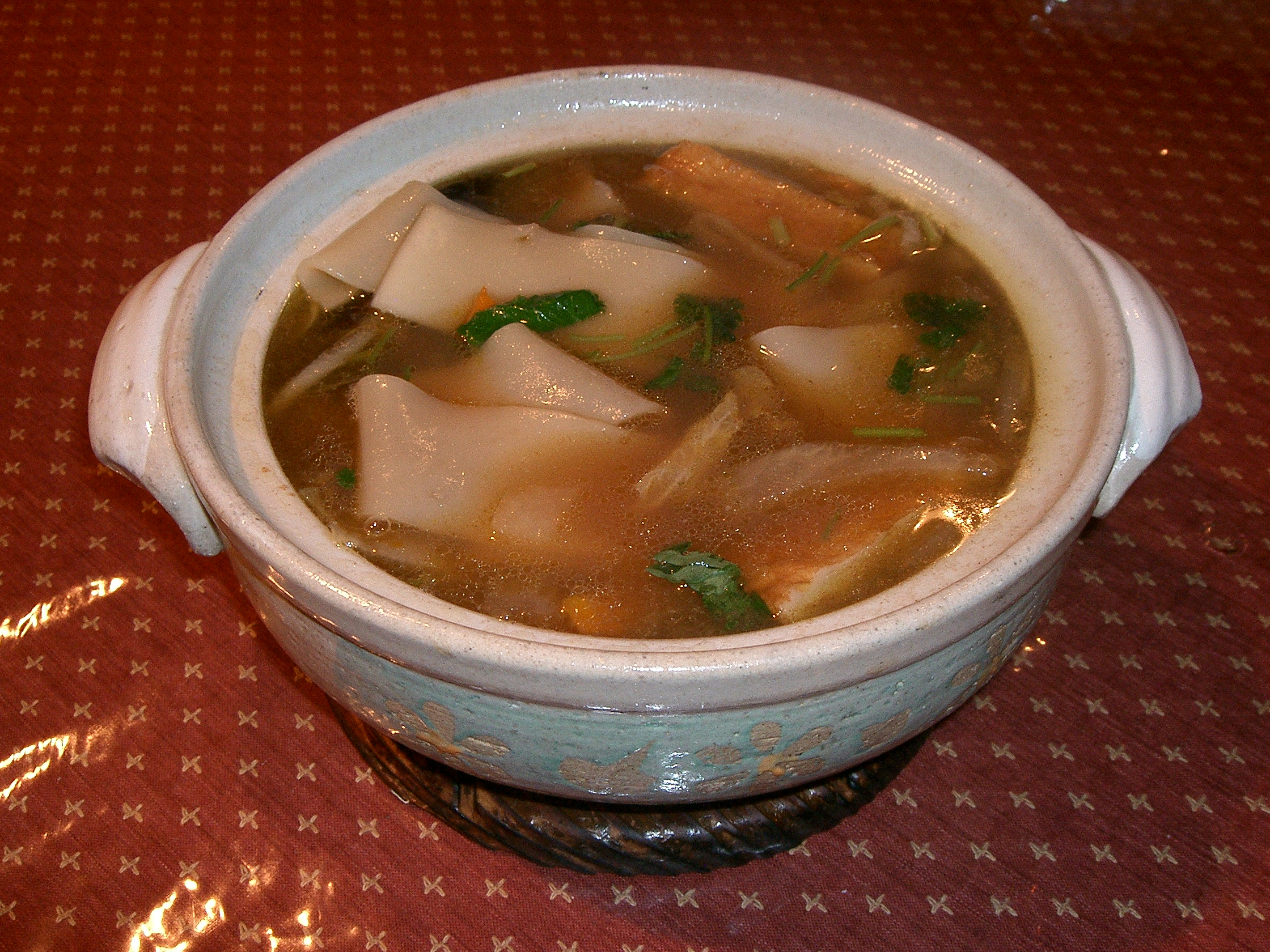
- Okkirikomi; wide noodles in hot broth
- Type: Noodles
- Place of origin: Japan
- Main ingredients: Wheat flour

Okkirikomi (okkirikomi, おっきりこみ) is a type of simmered noodle dish that can be found in Gunma Prefecture, some parts of northern Saitama Prefecture, and the Chichibu area. It is usually written in hiragana and sometimes seen as おきりこみ (okirikomi) but may sometimes be found in kanji as well (おっ切り込み).

== Overview ==
There are variations, but in general okkirikomi consists of fat noodles made from wheat flour that are placed raw in a pot with seasonal vegetables. It is then simmered in a thick broth made of miso or soy sauce and seasoned with mirin.

Areas in Japan where multi-cropping wheat is common tend to develop dishes based on wheat; okkirikomi is one example of this. Another is hōtō, a flat wheat noodle dish that originated in Yamanashi Prefecture. Although similar to other related wheat noodle dishes, okkirikomi has characteristics that differentiates it from the others.

== Origin ==
Okkirikomi is an old farmers' recipe that gained popularity due to its simplicity. The noodles are cut by hand into fat lengths and combined with seasonal vegetables such as carrots, leeks, sweet potatoes, taros, or daikon radishes. Then a generous amount of broth is added to the pot and left to simmer. In some areas it is also called nibōtō (煮ぼうとう) or joshu hōtō (上州ほうとう).

Other sources believe that okkirikomi was introduced via China in the 12th century; after eating it at the palace in Kyoto, Yoshishige Nitta brought it back to his home land (present day Gunma) and shared it with his family.

The name okkirikomi developed naturally. Noodles were cut and added to the pot to simmer, and more could be added as needed. In Japanese, this process can be expressed as 切っては入れ (kitte wa ire) and 切り込む (kirikomu), which then became okkirikomi.

== Regional differences ==
=== Flavor and ingredients ===
In northern and western Gunma, okkirikomi is typically miso based, but in eastern Gunma it tends to be soy sauce based. In central Gunma, both kinds are popular. Historically, soy sauce was widely available in Eastern Gunma but at that time there were not many opportunities to eat okkirikomi, so as soy sauce became more commonly available in everyday households, people in Eastern Gunma began using it instead of miso for their okkirikomi. It remained popular even when soy sauce became expensive.

The vegetables used in okkirikomi also varies depending on the area. In mountainous regions such as the towns surrounding Mt. Akagi and Mt. Haruna, taro is a common ingredient whereas in areas like Agatsuma and Tano District, potatoes are more often used. However, sweeter vegetables such as sweet potato or pumpkin are generally not added regardless of the area.

=== Differences between other kinds of noodles ===
==== Udon ====
When making okkirikomi noodles, salt is not added, and the noodles are raw when placed in the pot to simmer. The flour then dissolves into the broth, causing it to thicken. Because of the broth's thickness, eating okkirikomi helps warm up one's body, and thus it is a popular food in winter. Likewise, it is generally not cooked during hot summer months.

In the past, there was a difference in the quality of flour used for udon and okkirkomi; the latter sometimes contained some of the bran. Additionally, okkirikomi was cooked regularly in everyday life, whereas udon was only eaten on special occasions.

==== Hōtō ====
There are two main differences between okkirikomi and Yamanashi Prefecture's hōtō.

When compared with hōtō or udon in general, okkirikomi uses 2/3 less water when making the noodles. Using less water gives the noodles a good flavor, but causes them to harden quickly. It is important to knead them slowly yet forcefully to prevent the noodles from hardening. The ingredients are also different; while okkirikomi has both soy sauce and miso based variations, hoto is primarily soy sauce based. Hoto often has sweet vegetables such as pumpkin in it while okkirikomi does not.

== Cultural significance ==
It is known as one of Gunma's soulfoods and is often used for local tourism.

In 2007, the Ministry of Agriculture, Forestry and Fisheries held an event to find the top 100 best local dishes across all of Japan; okkirikomi was one of the dishes selected to represent Gunma. As such, it is known as one of Gunma's soulfoods. In 2009 the ministry published information about each featured dish in English (calling the event Japan's Tasty Secrets) to help spread Japanese food culture abroad.

In 2014, okkirikomi was designated as an Intangible Folk Cultural Property at the prefectural level.

In 2018, Gunma Prefecture ran a stamp rally to promote okkirikomi. 63 restaurants across the prefecture participated. Customers could use the stamps they collected to enter into a random drawing to win Gunma-chan themed prizes.

== See also ==
- Udon
- Hōtō
