= Karakkaze =

Strong, dry wind in Kantō, Japan

Karakkaze (空っ風、からっかぜ) refers to a kind of strong, dry wind that occurs in the Kantō region of Japan.

== Overview ==
Karakkaze is formed when wind gusts cross atop the mountains in the Jōetsu region and experience a drop in both temperature and atmospheric pressure. Water vapor in the air falls as rain or snow on the mountain, so the wind that then crosses over the mountain becomes dry.

Gunma Prefecture is famous for its karakkaze in winter. Other names include Jōmō Karakkaze (Jōmō is an old name for Gunma) and Akagi Oroshi (karakkaze that blows down from Mt. Akagi). In Jomo Karuta, karakkaze is featured on the 'ra' card.

Besides Gunma, Nasunohara in Tochigi Prefecture and Hamamatsu in Shizuoka Prefecture both are famous for karakkaze; there it is called Nasu and Enshu Karakkaze respectively.

== Effects ==
A phenomenon known as foehn wind suppresses cooling, which creates less snowfall in the surrounding area. This also creates a strong wind chill due to the strength of the winds.

Minor inconveniences caused by karakkaze include:

- interrupting outdoor sporting matches
- drying out skin (Gunma has ranked last in terms of beautiful skin according to a national survey on skin care)
- annoying locals (due to its loud howling sound)
- blowing laundry off balconies

However, it is strong enough to cause more serious damage. Wind speeds can reach up to 20 kilometers per hour, causing damage to old houses.

During the 1970s, residents in Ōta, Gunma complained that karakkaze was blowing up dust from the potato fields and spreading it throughout the city. They claimed the wind blew dust into their houses and prevented them from drying their laundry.

In February, 2021 a wildfire broke out in Ashikaga, Tochigi. The fire burned for nine consecutive days. In combination with an accumulation of dried leaves and debris, karakkaze made it difficult for helicopters to fly properly, delaying the fire department from being able to stop the blaze sooner.

== Uses ==
=== In agriculture ===
Farmers utilize the strong winds to dry various kinds of produce, such as konnyaku, cabbage, and cucumbers.

=== As renewable energy ===
Gunma Prefectural Studio Tsulunos did a presentation called Let’s Get Together Gunma Wind!! and addressed ways to harness the power of karakkaze for wind power generation.
