= Gumma Paz College =

Coordinates: 36°20′57″N 139°0′31.1″E

- 群馬パース大学
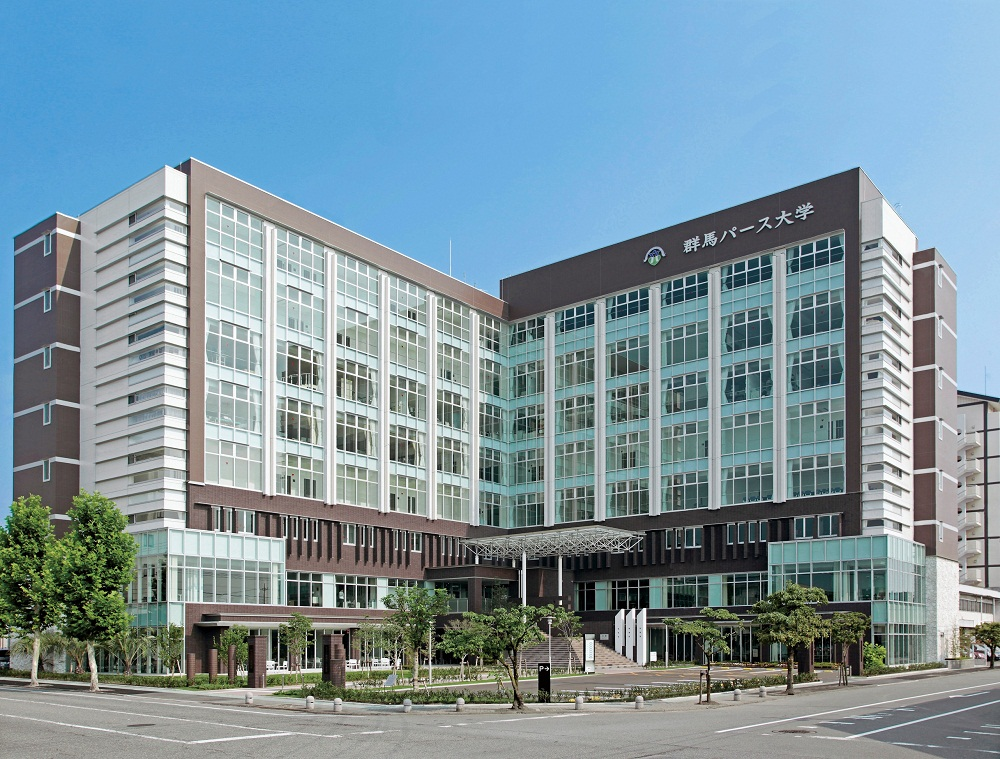
- Type: Private
- Established: Founded 1998; Chartered 2005
- Location: Takasaki, Gunma, Japan
- Website: Official website

Gumma Paz College (群馬パース大学, Gunma Paasu Daigaku) is a private university in Takasaki, Gunma, Japan, established in 2005. The predecessor of the school was founded in 1998.
