= Kiryu University =

Coordinates: 36°22′43.85″N 139°17′44.31″E

- 桐生大学
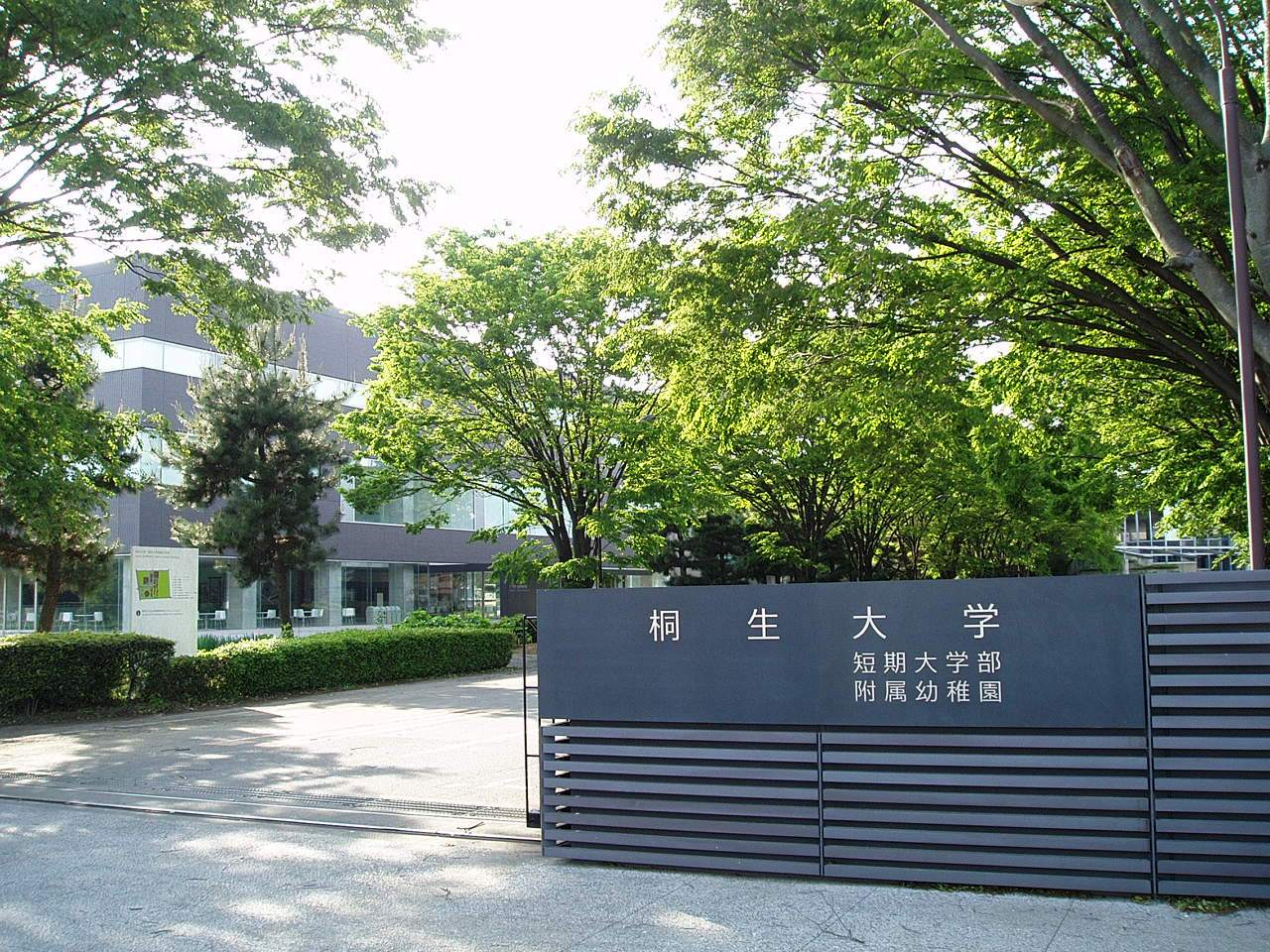
- Type: Private
- Established: Founded 1901; Chartered 2008
- President: Takushi Tadakuma
- Academic staff: 44 (May 2011)
- Students: 553 (May 2011)
- Location: Midori, Gunma, Japan
- Campus: Suburb
- Website: www.kiryu-u.ac.jp

Kiryu University (桐生大学, Kiryū daigaku) is a co-educational private university in Midori, Gunma, Japan. It is run by Kirigaoka Educational Institution (学校法人 桐丘学園) originated in Kiryu.

== History ==
The history of the university can be traced back to 1901, when Kiryu Girls' Sewing School was founded. In 1963 the educational institution established Kirigaoka Women's Junior College, which became co-educational and was renamed Kirigaoka Junior College in 1971. Again the college was renamed Kiryu Junior College in 1989. The junior college was started with only one department (Clothing); in 2008 it consisted of three departments (Living Science, Art & Design, and Nursing).

In 2008 the educational institution established Kiryu University, and the Department of Nursing of the junior college was merged into the university.

=== Undergraduate schools ===
- Faculty of Health Care
  - Department of Nutrition
  - Department of Nursing

=== Affiliated schools ===
- Kiryu University Junior College (formerly Kiryu Junior College)
  - Department of Living Science
  - Department of Art and Design
- Kiryu Daiichi High School
- Kiryu University Junior High School
- Kindergarten
