= Maebashi Institute of Technology =

Public university in Gunma Prefecture, Japan

Coordinates: 36°21′52″N 139°4′51.4″E

- 前橋工科大学
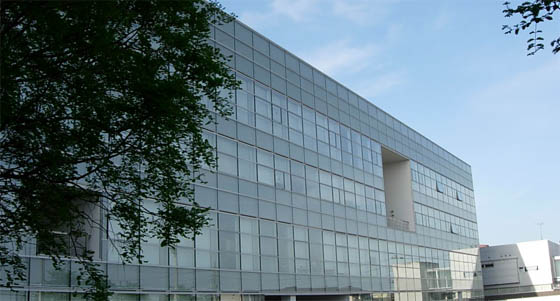
- Type: Public
- Established: Founded 1952; Chartered 1997
- Location: Maebashi, Gunma, Japan
- Website: Official website

Maebashi Institute of Technology (前橋工科大学, Maebashi kōka daigaku) is a public university in Maebashi, Gunma, Japan. The predecessor of the school was founded in 1952 and was chartered as a university in 1997.
