= Takayama, Gunma =

Takayama 高山村
- Village
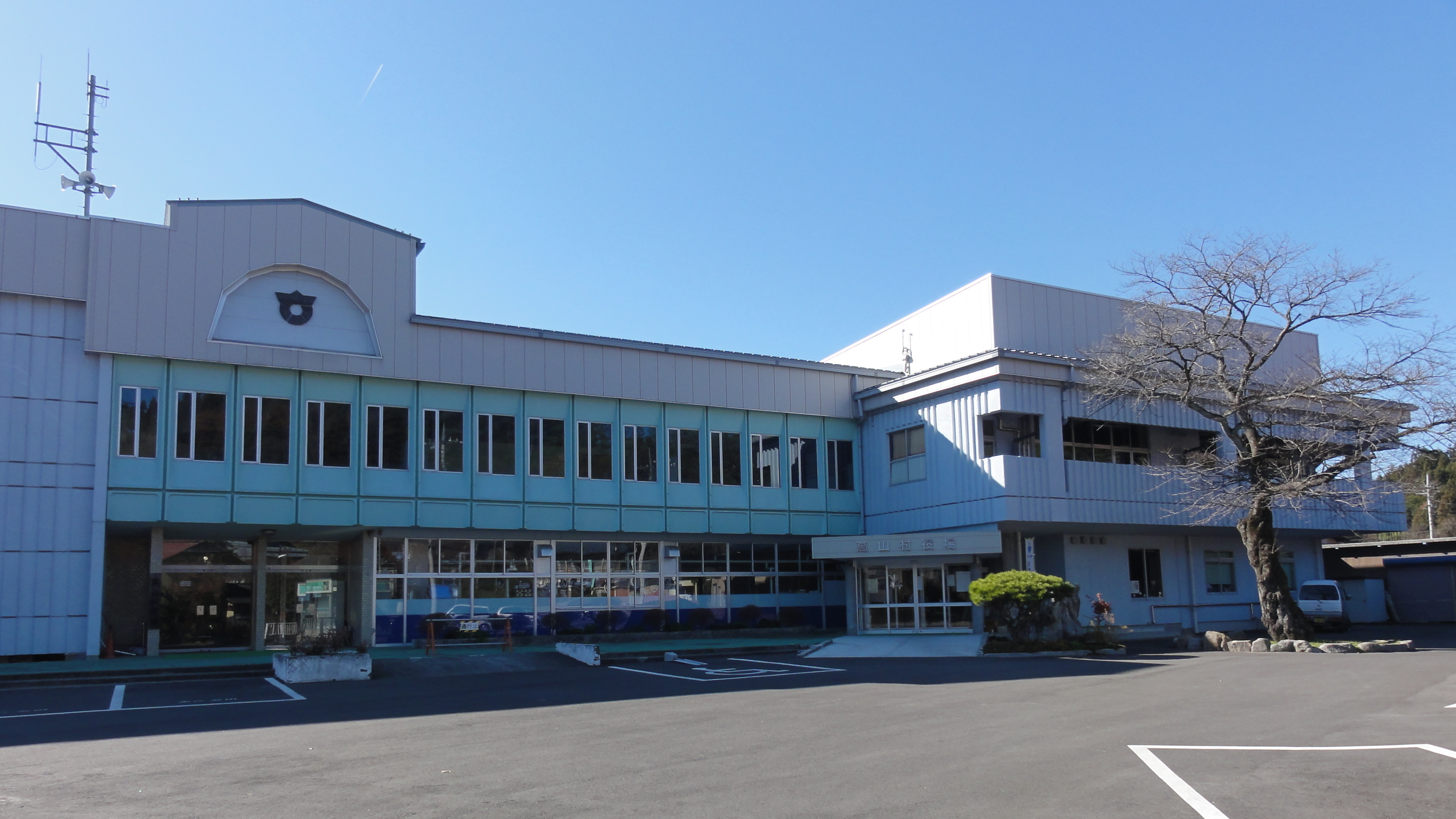
- Takayama village office

- Flag Seal

- Location of Takayama in Gunma Prefecture

- Coordinates: 36°37′4.7″N 138°56′36.9″E
- Country: Japan
- Region: Kantō
- Prefecture: Gunma
- District: Agatsuma

Area
  - Total: 64.18 km^{2} (24.78 sq mi)

Population (September 2020)
  - Total: 6,889
  - Density: 107.3/km^{2} (278.0/sq mi)
- Time zone: UTC+9 (Japan Standard Time)
- Tree: Oak
- Flower: Japanese Gentian
- Bird: Copper pheasant
- Phone number: 0279-63-2111
- Address: 2856-1 Nakayama, Takayama-mura, Agatsuma-gun, Gunma-ken 377-0702
- Website: Official website

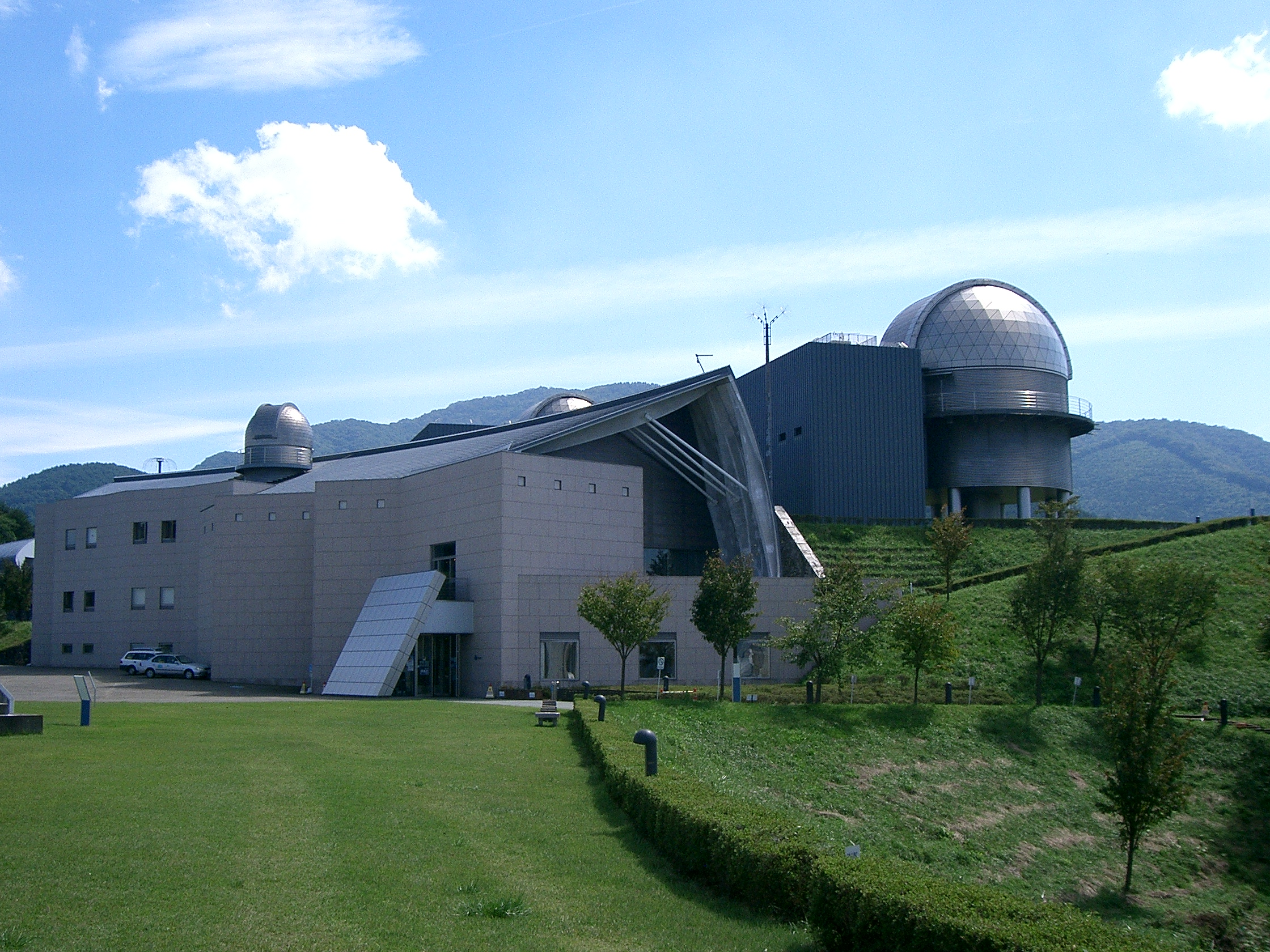
Gunma Astronomical Observatory

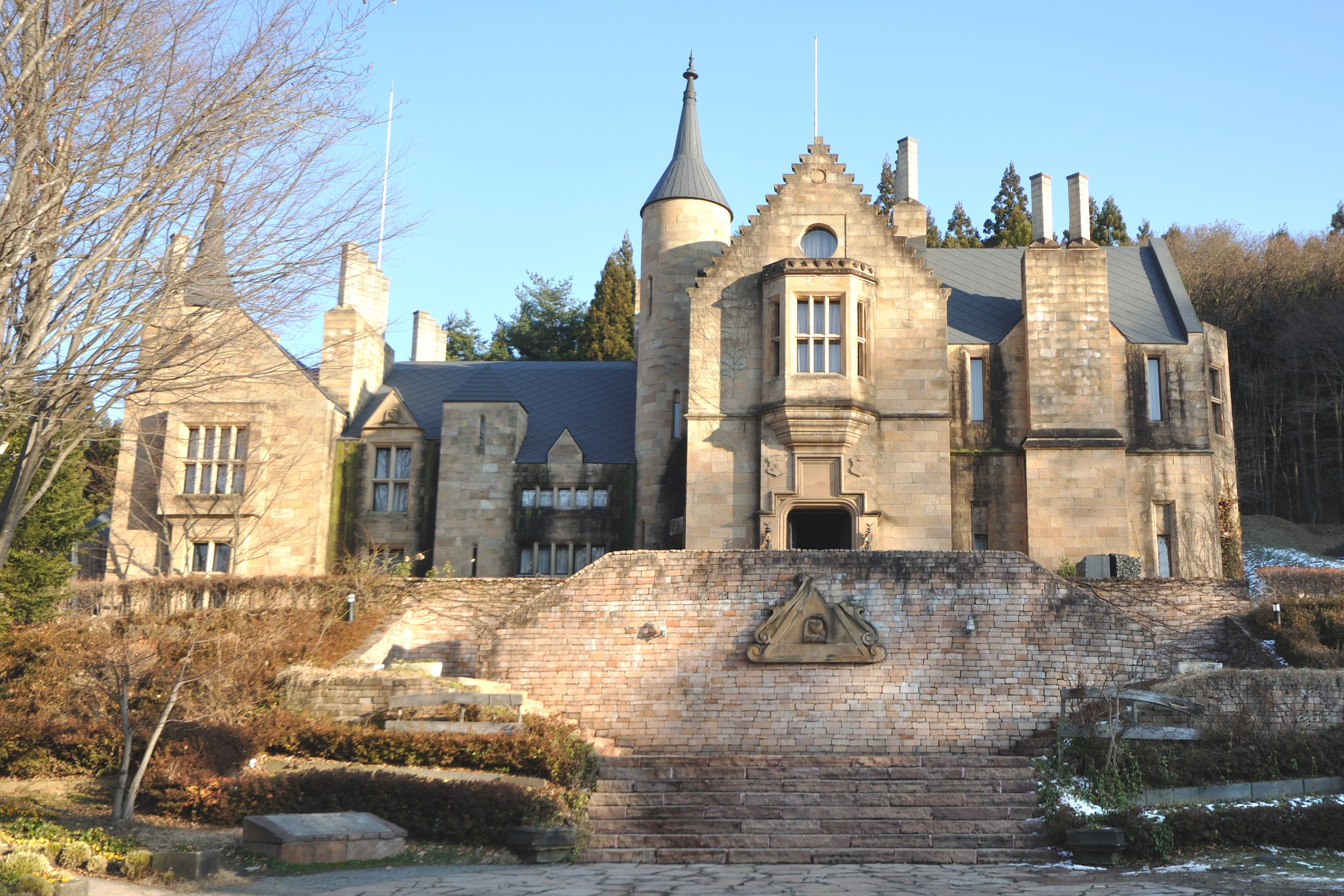
Marble Village Lockheart Castle

Takayama (高山村, Takayama-mura) is a village located in Gunma Prefecture, Japan. As of 1 September 2020, the village had an estimated population of 6,889 in 2449 households, and a population density of 110 persons per km^{2}. The total area of the village is 64.18 square kilometres (24.78 sq mi).

== Geography ==
Located at the easternmost point of Agatsuma District, Takayama is surrounded by mountains at all cardinal directions. The Gunma Telescope is located on Mount Komochi in the south.

- Mountains: Mount Onoko (1208m), Junigadake (1200.9m), Mount Komochi (1296m)
- Rivers: Agatsuma River

=== Surrounding municipalities ===
Gunma Prefecture

- Minakami
- Nakanojō
- Numata
- Shibukawa

=== Climate ===
Takayama has a humid continental climate (Köppen Dfb) characterized by warm summers and cold winters with heavy snowfall. The average annual temperature in Takayama is 6.7 °C. The average annual rainfall is 1548 mm with September as the wettest month. The temperatures are highest on average in August, at around 21.7 °C, and lowest in January, at around -5.7 °C.

== Demographics ==
Per Japanese census data, the population of Takayama has remained relatively steady over the past century.

Historical population
Year	Pop.	±%
1920	3,286	—
1930	3,688	+12.2%
1940	4,025	+9.1%
1950	4,965	+23.4%
1960	4,813	−3.1%
1970	4,161	−13.5%
1980	4,788	+15.1%
1990	4,087	−14.6%
2000	4,348	+6.4%
2010	3,911	−10.1%
2020	3,511	−10.2%

== History ==
During the Edo period, the area around Takayama was part of the hatamoto-administered territory within Kōzuke Province. With the creation of the modern municipalities system after the Meiji Restoration on April 1, 1889, the village of Takayama was created within Agatsuma District of Gunma Prefecture.

== Government ==
Takayama has a mayor-council form of government with a directly elected mayor and a unicameral village council of 10 members. Takayama, collectively with the other municipalities in Agatsuma District, contributes two members to the Gunma Prefectural Assembly. In terms of national politics, the village is part of Gunma 5th district of the lower house of the Diet of Japan.

== Economy ==
The economy of Takayama is primarily agricultural.

== Education ==
Takayama has one public elementary school and one public middle school operated by the village government. The village does not have a high school.

- Gumma Paz Gakuen College

== Transportation ==
Takayama is served by a rail line from Nagoya.

It is also home to one of 10 musical roads located in Gunma prefecture alone; the song played is "When You Wish Upon a Star."

== Local attractions ==
- Gunma Prefectural Astronomical Observatory
- Marble Village Lockheart Castle
