= Marble Village Lockheart Castle =

Japanese theme park

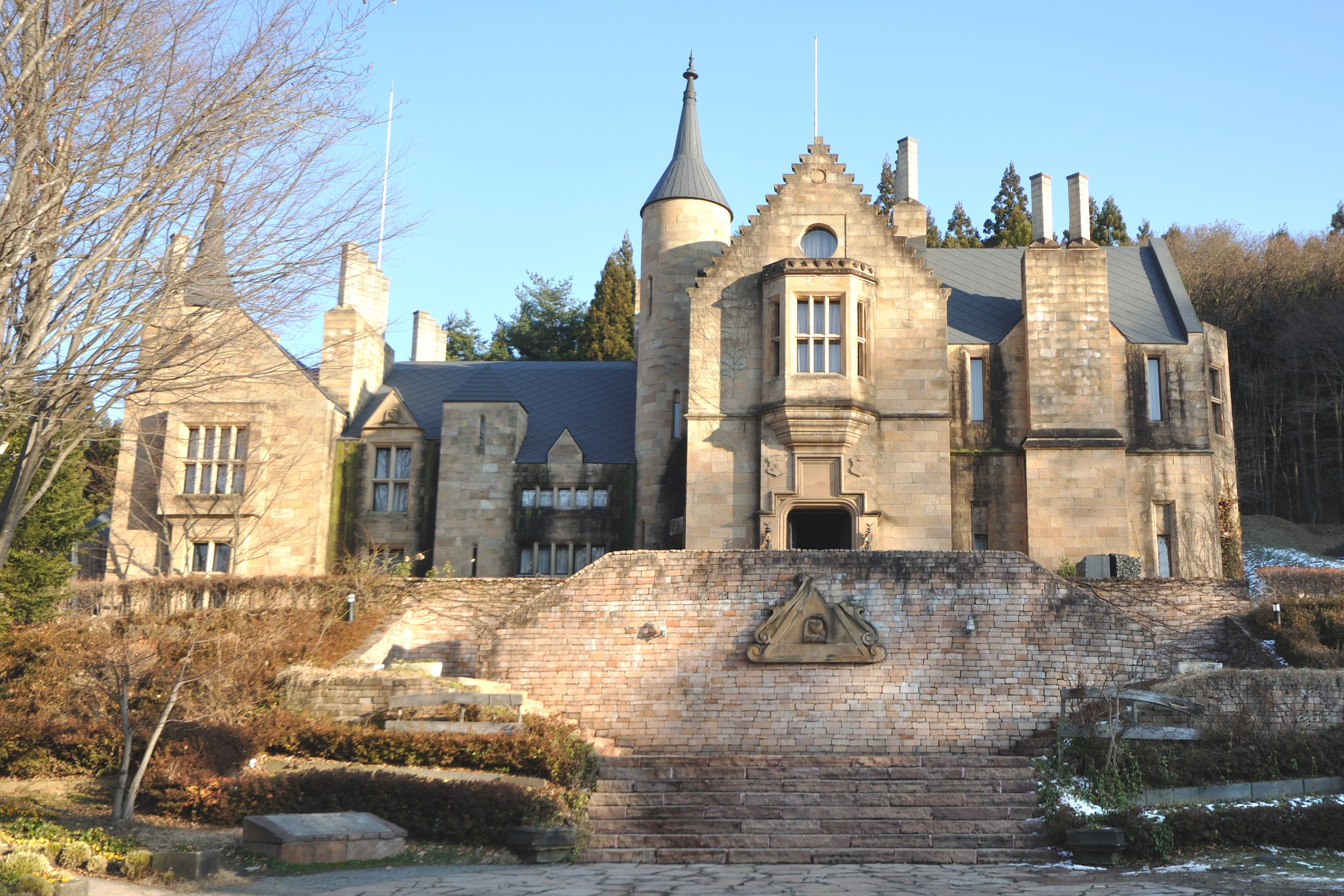
- Interactive map of Marble Village Lockheart Castle
- Location: Takayama, Gunma, Japan
- Coordinates: 36.630833°N 138.988056°E
- Opened: 6 April 1993; 33 years ago

Marble Village Lockheart Castle (大理石村ロックハート城, Dairiseki-mura rokkuhāto-jō) is a theme park in the village of Takayama, Gunma Prefecture, Japan. It is based around a reproduction of a 19th-century Scottish castle.

== Milton Lockhart House ==
Lockheart Castle
- ロックハート城
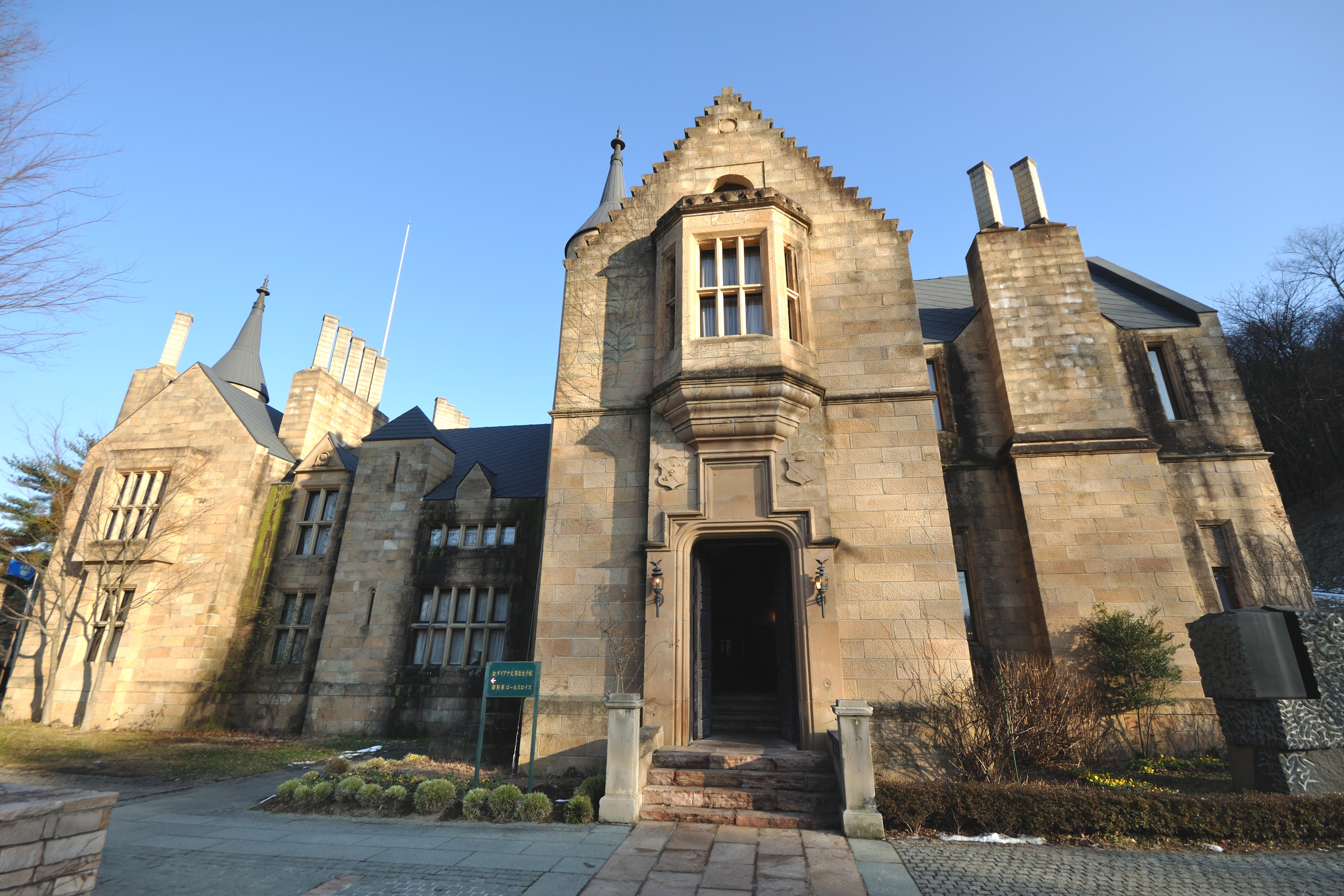
- The reconstructed residence
- Interactive map of the Lockheart Castle area
- Former names: Milton Lockhart House

General information
- Location: Takayama, Gunma, Japan
- Completed: 1829; 1993 (reconstruction)
- Demolished: 1987
- Owner: Masahiko Tsugawa

Design and construction
- Architect: William Burn

The Lockheart Castle, originally known as the Milton Lockhart House, was a residence built in 1829 in Carluke, Scotland by William Lockhart, a member of the British Parliament. It was designed by William Burn. The Lockhart family retained the residence until the Second World War.

In 1987, the Milton Lockhart House was bought by Japanese actor Masahiko Tsugawa. The mansion was subsequently deconstructed, and its original building materials were transported to Japan in 1988 via the Trans-Siberian Railway, with permission from Mikhail Gorbachev. The residence was rebuilt in 1993 in the "Marble Village" theme park in Takayama. It was the first time a European mansion was relocated to Japan.

== In popular culture ==
The theme park served as a filming location for several movies, TV series, and music videos. For example, the Lockheart Castle appeared in the 2019 film Fly Me to the Saitama, and in music videos for the songs "Aristocrat's Symphony" by Versailles and "Mayonaka ni Kawashita Yakusoku" by Malice Mizer.
