= Gumma Paz Gakuen College =

Higher education institution in Gunma Prefecture, Japan

Coordinates: 36°20′57″N 139°0′31.1″E

- 群馬パース学園短期大学
- Type: private
- Established: 1998
- Location: Takayama, Gunma, Japan
- Website: Official website

Gumma Paz Gakuen College (群馬パース学園短期大学, Gumma Paz Gakuen Tanki Daigakubu) is a private junior college in Takayama, Gunma, Japan.

== History ==
- 1998: Junior College was established
- 2001: Advanced course was set up
- 2002: The second Academic department was set up.
- 2003: New campus was set up at Takasaki, Gunma
- 2005: It was changed to four years college or Gumma Paz College.

== Names of Academic department ==
- Nursing
- Physical Therapy

== Advanced course ==
- Public Health Nursing

== See also ==
- List of junior colleges in Japan
