= Gunma-chan =

Mascot created by the government of Gunma Prefecture, Japan

- First appearance: 1983
- Created by: Baba Noboru

In-universe information
- Species: Pony

Gunma-chan (ぐんまちゃん, formerly known as Yūma-chan, or ゆうまちゃん) is the fictional yuru-chara mascot of Gunma Prefecture. There are two official versions of the character.

== The original version ==
The original Gunma-chan debuted in 1983 as a mascot character for a sporting event held in Gunma. The design was a running horse with a blue mane. When the rights were later transferred to the prefecture, they did not include the right to change the design, which is why there are two different official versions of the mascot. After that Gunma-chan was made the official mascot of Gunma. Although since replaced with the second generation version, images of the original can still be seen around Gunma, such as at the Gunmaken Bajikoen in Maebashi or the Dodaira-gawa Dam in Shimonita.

== The second version ==
The second version is currently used for regional promotion of Gunma Prefecture. Then called Yūma-chan, it made its first official appearance at the 3rd National Sports Tournament for Intellectual Disabled Athletes in 1994. Submissions for a new mascot design were accepted from the public, with prefectural employee Fumiko Nakajima's being chosen as the winner. The name Yūma-chan was created by combining the words yūai (referring to the disabled athletes) and Gunma. In this version, Yuma-chan is a pony that walks on two legs and is supposed to be the chibi version of the original. This time, when rights were passed to prefecture, the right to change the design was also included, which is why there are variations to the design in use today. For example, in addition to the classic "boy" version with a green hat, there is a "girl" version with a ribbon.

Gunma then began revamping its PR efforts; Yuma-chan was rebranded into the present day Gunma-chan after the opening of the Gunma Sogo Joho Center, (a general information center) that was opened in Ginza, Tokyo, in July 2008. It is commonly known as Gunma-chan's House.

The prefecture had a budget of over 125 million yen in 2020 to promote Gunma-chan and its brand. That budget was more than doubled to over 329 million in 2021.

== Character profile ==
Birthday: 22 February

Age: 7-years-old (no matter how many years pass)

Special Skills: Mysterious healing power

Sex: None

== Costume rental ==
Starting in 2000, a Gunma-chan costume was available to rent for private events, helping to improve its name recognition with the public.

As of June 2020, the prefecture owns 18 Gunma-chan costumes available and they are used in situations when Gunma-chan needs to make appearances in different places at the same time. In 2019 alone there were 787 requests to borrow the costumes; the most requests ever received stands at 906. However, the public noticed the inconsistencies with how each Gunma-chan performed (as it depended on who was wearing the costume) which caused citizens to complain when these behaviours did not fit the image of the original Gunma-chan. In 2013, this became a topic of debate in the Prefectural Assembly. After Gunma-chan won the Yuru-Chara Grand Prix in 2014, Gunma established guidelines for those renting the costumes, including a limited number of gestures and moves that were allowed to be performed in public. Afterwards it was found that there were many cases in which those guidelines were ignored.

On 12 May 2020, Gunma's Media Promotion Division decided that in order to protect Gunma-chan's image there would no longer be any costume rentals allowed. Instead, starting in October of that year, Gunma-chan itself would head the Gunma-chan Caravan Corps, a group that would dispatch Gunma-chan for free when needed. However, due to this policy change, Gunma-chan now only appears at official PR events designated by the prefecture.

== PR activities ==
=== Events ===
Gunma-chan has made appearances at various events and competitions over the years. Some include:

In 1996, it appeared at a national sports festival held in Gunma.

In 2004, it appeared at sporting event held for disabled athletes.

In 2005, it placed first in a national character popularity contest sponsored by the Mainichi Newspaper company, in which it won more than half of the votes.

In 2015, it was designated as a mascot for a winter sports event held in Gunma. Official Gunma-chan art showed Gunma-chan performing various winter sports.

==== Yuru-Chara Grand Prix ====
Gunma-chan steadily gained nationwide popularity through participating in the Yuru-Chara Grand Prix. In 2011, it placed 18th; in 2012 and 2013, it placed 3rd; and in 2014, it won 1st place with 1,002,505 votes.

=== Merchandise and goods ===
Gunma-chan themed goods are sold in souvenir shops, convenience stores, and stations around the prefecture. An online store was also established after the anime's release.

As 28 October is Gunma Citizens Day, the prefecture releases a notebook that features Gunma-chan on the cover every year.

From 12 December 2012, Gunma-chan was appointed as the head manager of the prefectural PR department and also acts as an ambassador for sukiyaki and ginhikari fish, two dishes that the prefecture has been trying to promote in recent years.

Gunma will be releasing a Gunma-chan themed license plate available starting October 2023.

=== Local government ===
Each local government in Gunma has its own official Gunma-chan art that it uses.

On the official Gunma Prefecture website, there is a "Gunma-chan mode" that once toggled changes all the pictures and banners to Gunma-chan versions.

=== TV appearances ===
Gunma-chan was featured on TV Asahi in a program called Sanma no Nan Demo Derby.

A Gunma-chan plushie appeared on the Tokyo MX program called 5 Ji Ni Muchu. Since 1017, Gunma-chan has also been making regular appearances on Gunma Ichiban, which is broadcast on Gunma TV.

=== In anime ===
Gunma-chan was featured as the main character in an anime called Gunma-chan (アニメぐんまちゃん in Japanese), which aired from 3 October 2021 to 26 December 2021 on Tokyo MX and seven other network. There are 39 episodes in the first season, with each being about seven minutes long. It is narrated by Takako Honda. The television series is produced by the studio Ascension and directed by Mitsuru Hongo. The opening theme song is "Switch!" by Karin Takahashi, Aya Uchida and Yui Ogura, while the ending theme is "Happy" by Maria Imamura. A promotional poster was distributed for free prior to its release. Originally a premiere was set to be held on 8 August 2021, but was cancelled due to the COVID-19 pandemic. An episode from the series streamed early on YouTube from 17 September to 2 October 2021.

A second season premiered on 8 April 2023, with returning casts.

The anime sparked confusion for locals when it first aired; despite official sources stating for years that Gunma-chan had no sex, in the anime Gunma-chan's sister calls it her big brother throughout the series, implying that Gunma-chan is a boy.

== Collaborations ==
In 2012, Gunma-chan appeared in a mobile game called Gunma no Yabo.

From 2013 to 2015, Hotel Metropolitan Takasaki had a Gunma-chan themed room that guests could book.

In 2014, Gunma-chan was featured on a series of cup noodles that were sold across the country. The following year, a brand of yakisoba noodles was also released.

Local sweets shops sometimes sell Gunma-chan themed desserts. One example is Omama Aoyagi located in Midori City, Gunma.

From April 2020 to April 2022, The Jomo Electric Railway company ran about 700 trains that were Gunma-chan themed.
