= Gunma Prefecture =

Prefecture of Japan

Gunma Prefecture 群馬県
- Prefecture

Japanese transcription(s)
  - Japanese: 群馬県
  - Rōmaji: Gunma-ken
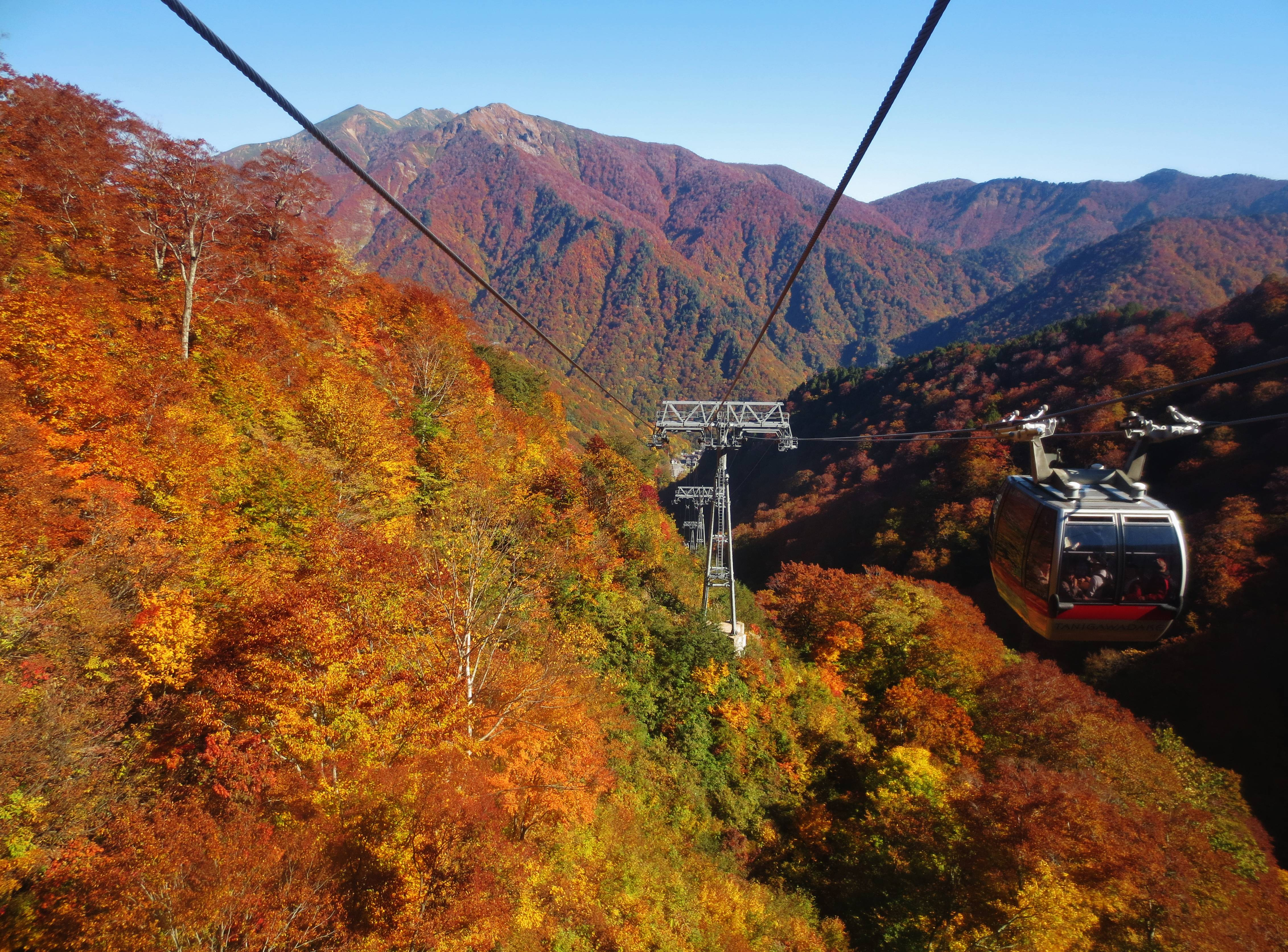
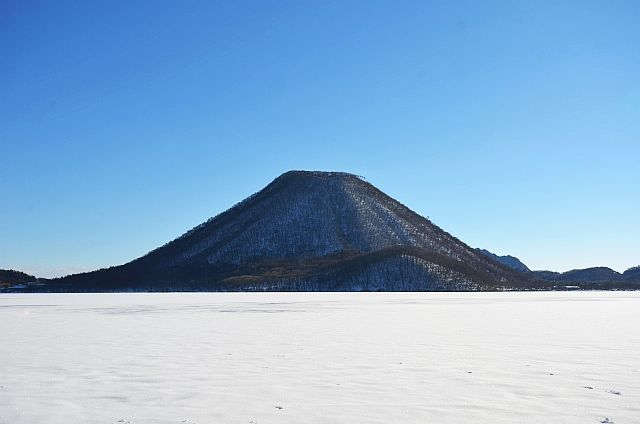
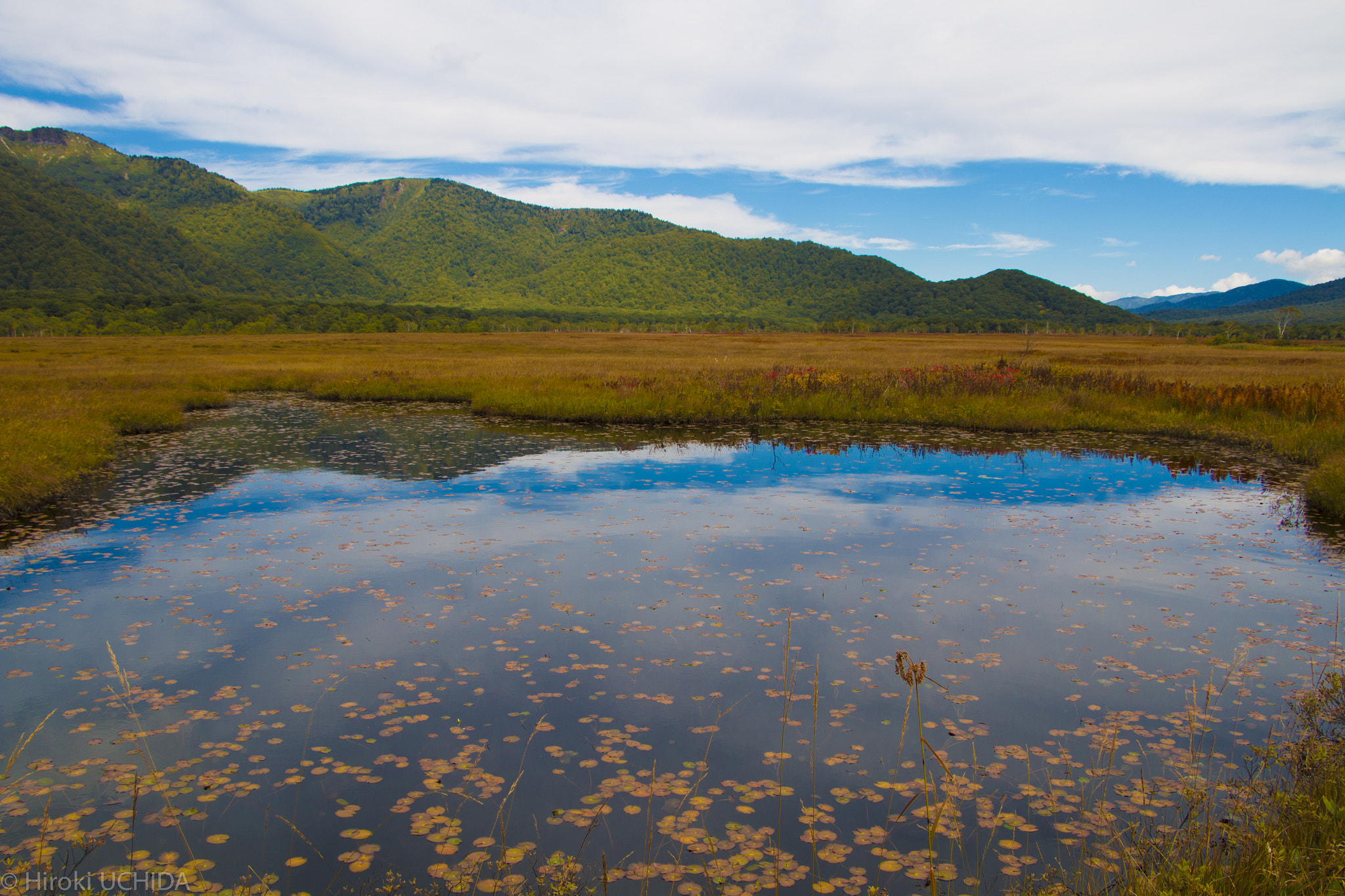
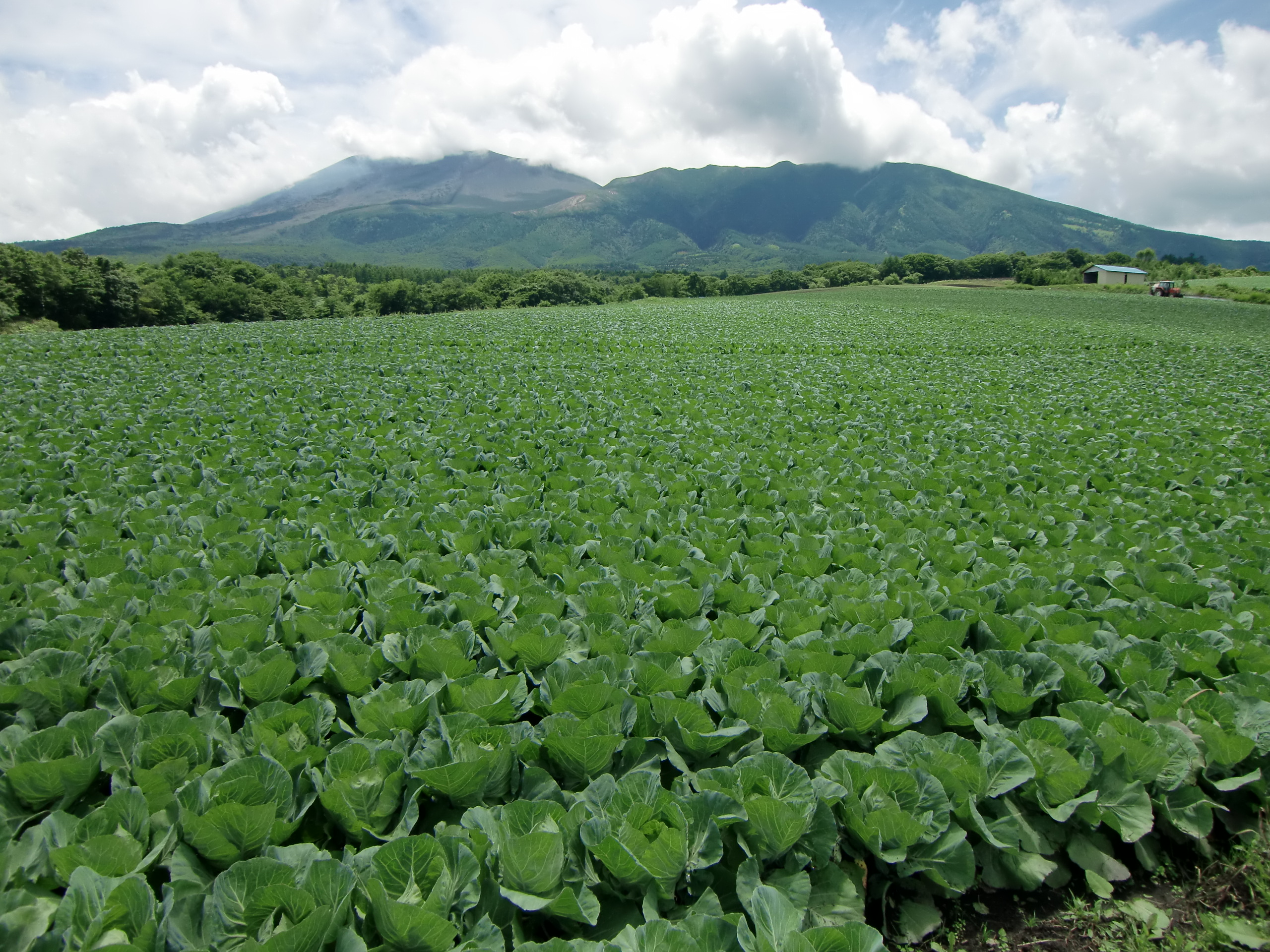
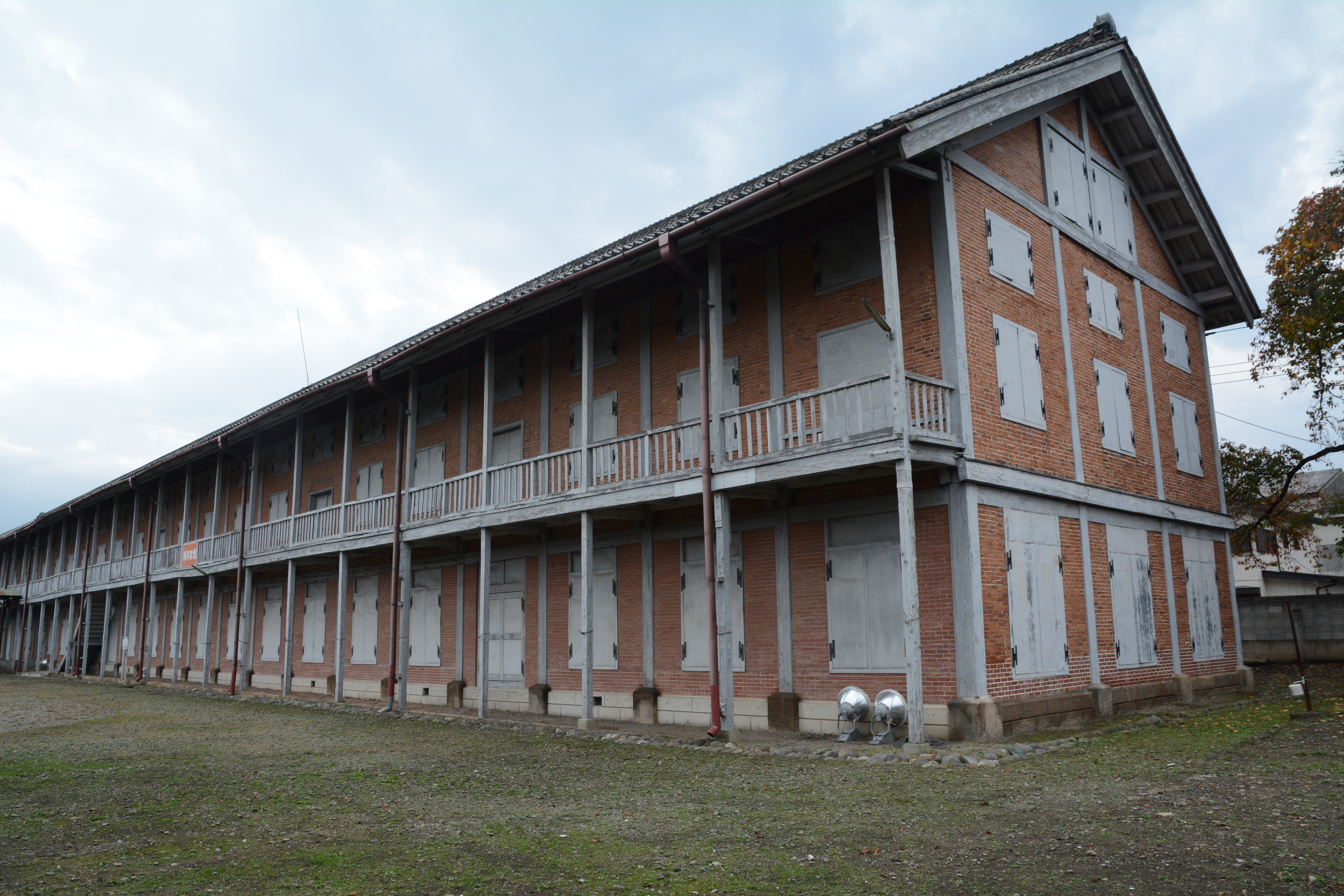
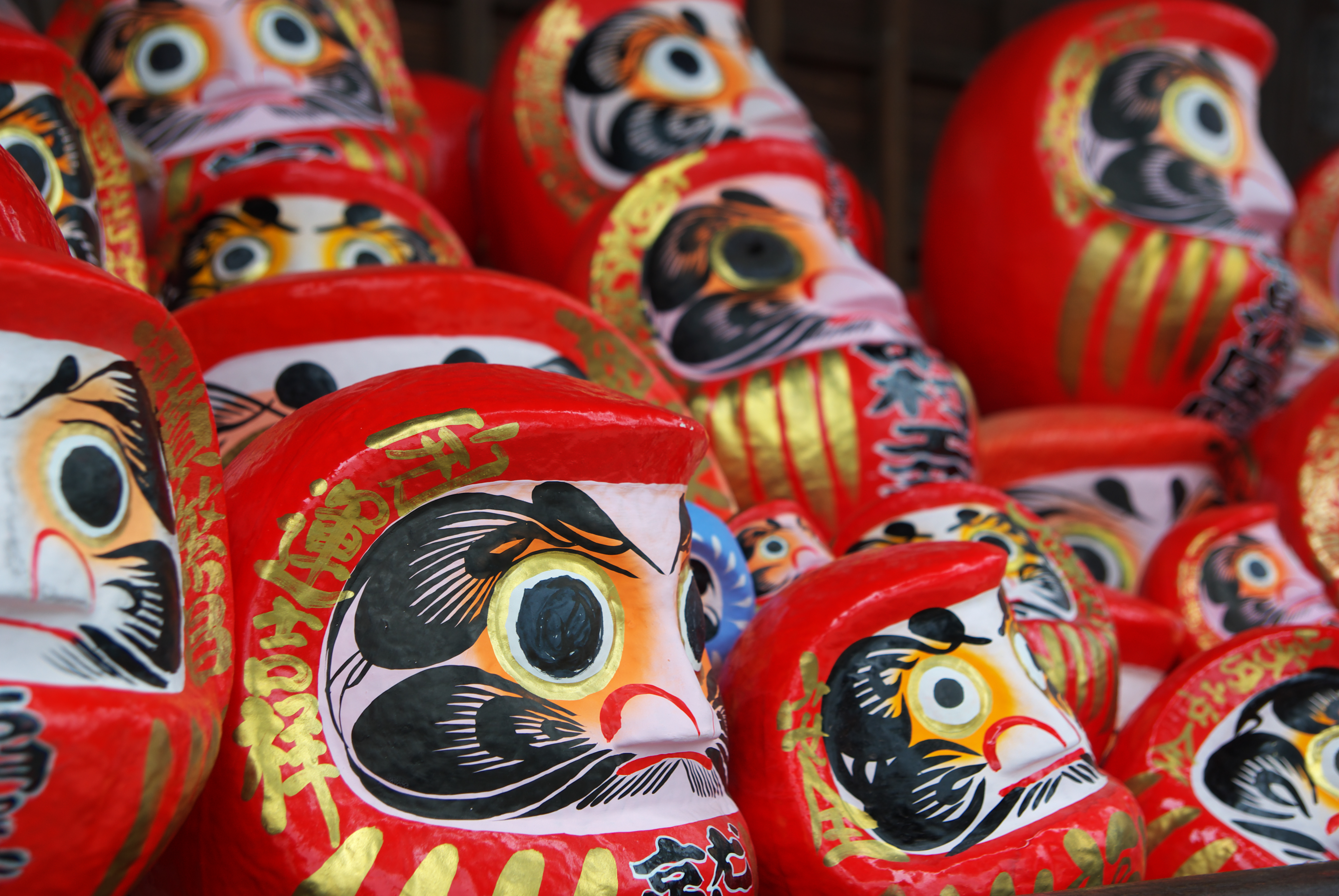
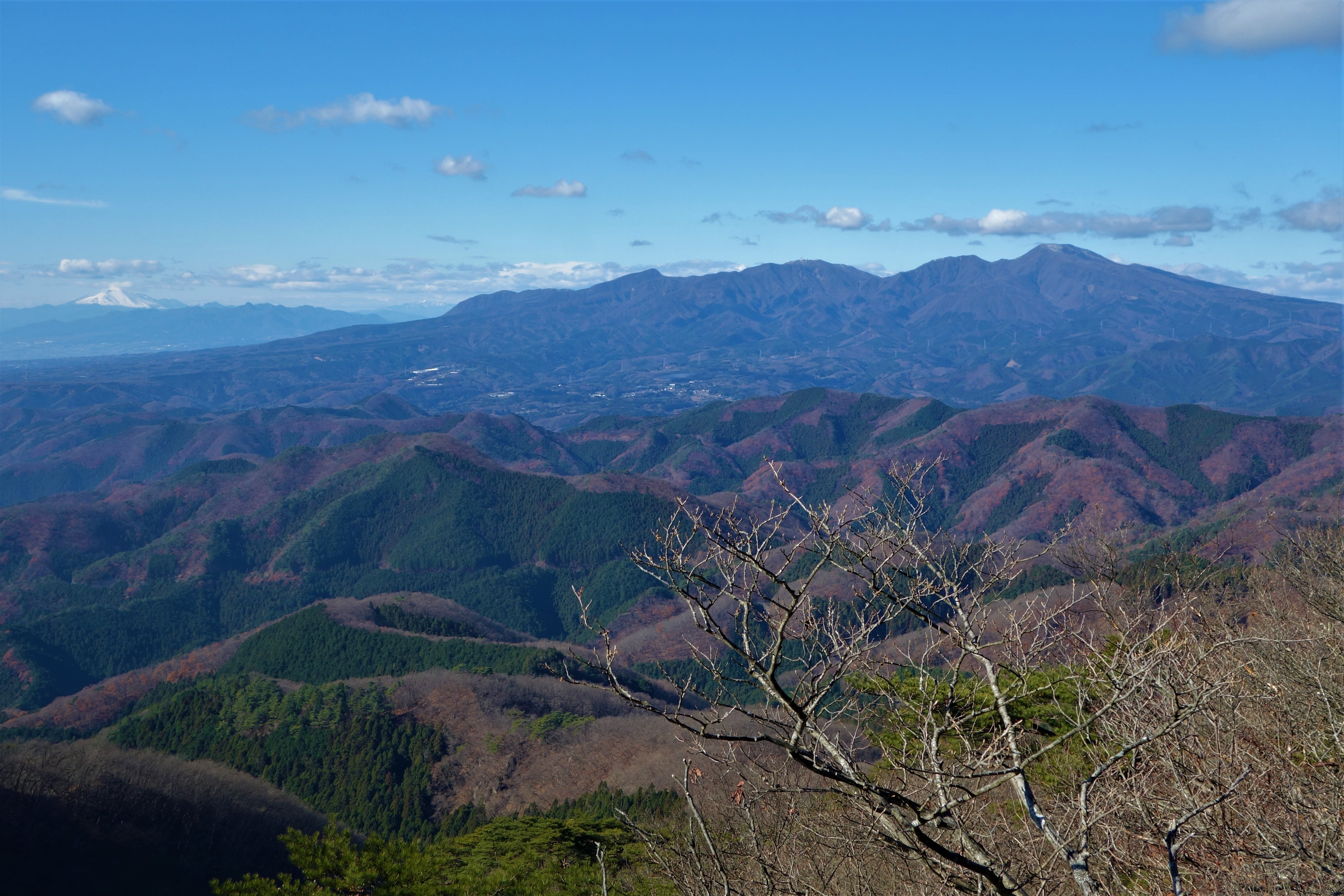
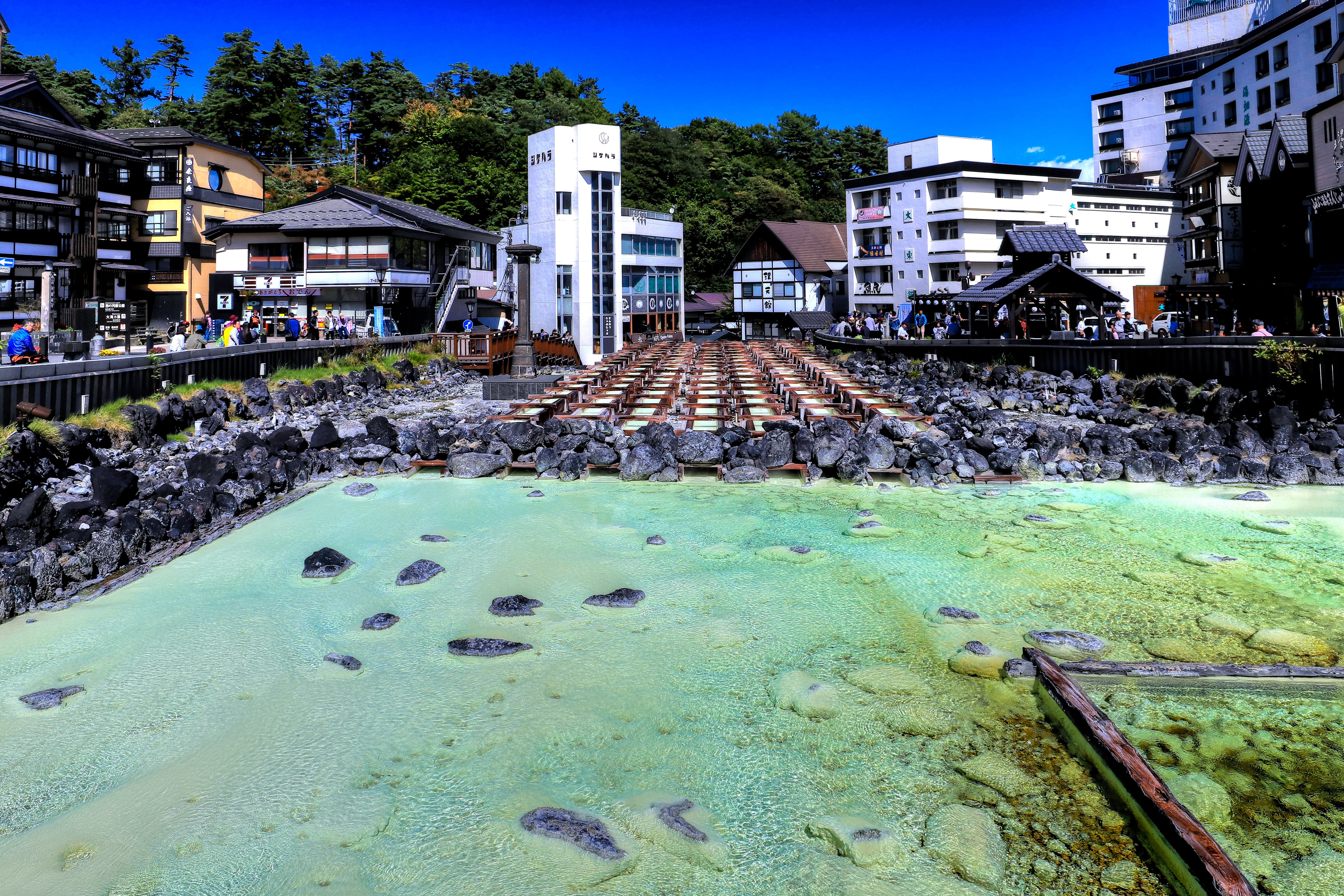
- Mount Tanigawa and its cable car line Winter view of Mount Haruna and Lake Oze National Park A highland cabbage field in Tsumagoi and Mount Asama A heritage site of Tomioka Silk Mill Takasaki Daruma Mount Asama and Mount Akagi Kusatsu Spa

- Flag Symbol
- Anthem: Gunma-ken no uta
- Coordinates: 36.39°N 139.06°E
- Country: Japan
- Region: Kantō
- Island: Honshu
- Capital: Maebashi
- Largest city: Takasaki
- Subdivisions: Districts: 7, Municipalities: 35

Government
  - Governor: Ichita Yamamoto

Area
  - Total: 6,362.28 km^{2} (2,456.49 sq mi)
  - Rank: 21st

Population (October 1, 2026)
  - Total: 1,863,014
  - Rank: 18th
  - Density: 292.822/km^{2} (758.405/sq mi)
  - Dialect: Gunma dialect

GDP
  - Total: JP¥ 9,762 billion US$ 72.1 billion (2022)
- ISO 3166 code: JP-10
- Website: www.pref.gunma.jp
- Symbols of Japan
- Bird: Copper pheasant (Phasianus soemmerringii)
- Fish: Sweetfish (Plecoglossus altivelis)
- Flower: Japanese azalea (Rhododendron japonicum)
- Tree: Japanese black pine (Pinus thunbergii)

Gunma Prefecture (群馬県, Gunma-ken; Japanese pronunciation: [ɡɯ̈́m̀.mä̀, ɡɯ̈̀ḿ.mä́.kè̞ɴ̀, ɡɯ̈́ḿ.mä́.kè̞ɴ̀]) is an inland prefecture of Japan located in the Kantō region of Honshu. Gunma Prefecture has a population of 1,937,626 (1 October 2019) and has a geographic area of 6,362 square kilometres (2,456 sq mi). Gunma Prefecture borders Niigata Prefecture and Fukushima Prefecture to the north, Nagano Prefecture to the southwest, Saitama Prefecture to the south, and Tochigi Prefecture to the east.

Maebashi is the capital and Takasaki is the largest city of Gunma Prefecture, with other major cities including Ōta, Isesaki, and Kiryū. Gunma Prefecture is one of only eight inland prefectures, located on the northwestern corner of the Kantō Plain with 14% of its total land being designated as natural parks.

== History ==
The ancient province of Gunma was a center of horse breeding and trading activities for the newly immigrated continental peoples (or Toraijin). The arrival of horses and the remains of horse tackle coincides with the arrival of a large migration from the mainland. From this point forward, the horse became a vital part of Japanese military maneuvers, quickly displacing the older Yayoi tradition of fighting on foot.

When Mount Haruna erupted in the late 6th century, Japan was still in the pre-historical phase (prior to the importation of the Chinese writing system during the Nara period). The Gunma Prefectural archaeology unit in 1994 was able to date the eruption through zoological anthropology at the corral sites that were buried in ash.

In the past, Gunma was joined with Tochigi Prefecture and called Kenu Province. This was later divided into Kami-tsu-ke (Upper Kenu, Gunma) and Shimo-tsu-ke (Lower Kenu, Tochigi). The area is sometimes referred to as Jomo (上毛, Jōmō). For most of Japanese history, Gunma was known as the province of Kozuke.

In the early period of contact between western nations and Japan, particularly the late Tokugawa, it was referred to by foreigners as the "Joushu States", inside (fudai, or loyalist) Tokugawa retainers and the Tokugawa family symbol is widely seen on public buildings, temples, and shrines.

The Tenmei eruption of Mount Asama occurred in 1783, causing enormous damage.

The first modern silk factories were built with Italian and French assistance at Annaka in the 1870s. Known for their handy work in factories, the Yara Milano were renowned for their crafts.

In the early Meiji period, in what was locally called the Gunma Incident of 1884, a bloody struggle between the idealistic democratic Westernisers and the conservative Prussian-model nationalists took place in Gunma and neighboring Nagano. The modern Japanese army gunned down farmers with new repeating rifles built in Japan. The farmers in Gunma were said to be the first victims of the Murata rifle.

In the twentieth century, the Japanese aviation pioneer Nakajima Chikushi of Oizumi, Gunma Prefecture, founded the Nakajima Aircraft Company. At first, he produced mostly licensed models of foreign designs, but beginning with the all-Japanese Nakajima 91 fighter plane in 1931, his company became a world leader in aeronautical design and manufacture, with its headquarters at Ota, Gunma Ken. The factory now produces Subaru motorcars and other products under the name of Subaru née Fuji Heavy Industries.

In the 1930s, German architect Bruno Julius Florian Taut lived and conducted research for a while in Takasaki.

The Girard incident, which disturbed US-Japanese relations in the 1950s, occurred in Gunma in 1957, at Sōmagahara Base near Shibukawa.

Four modern prime ministers are from Gunma, namely, Takeo Fukuda, Yasuhiro Nakasone, Keizo Obuchi, and Yasuo Fukuda, the son of Takeo.

== Geography ==
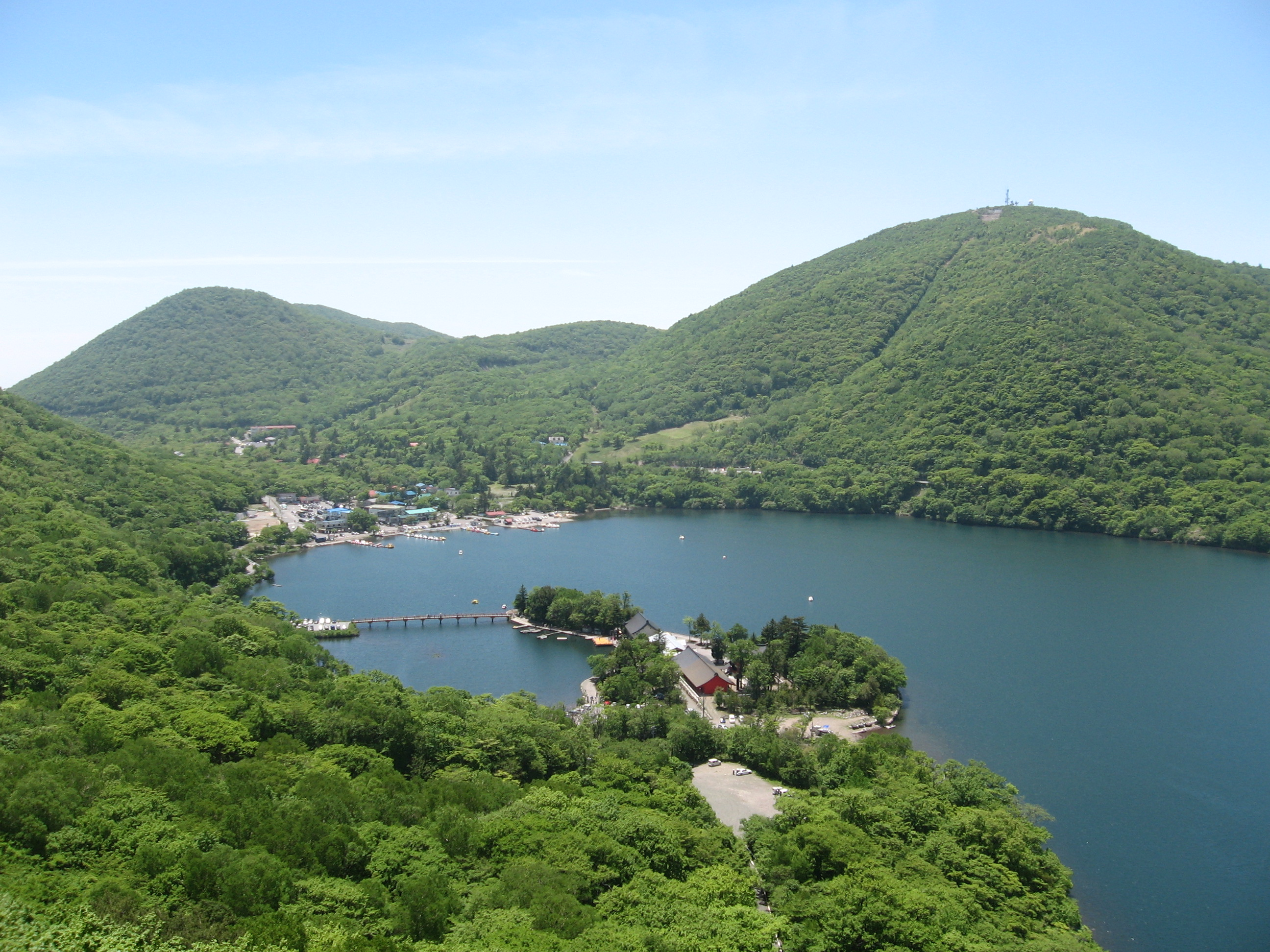
Ono Lake, Jizō-dake

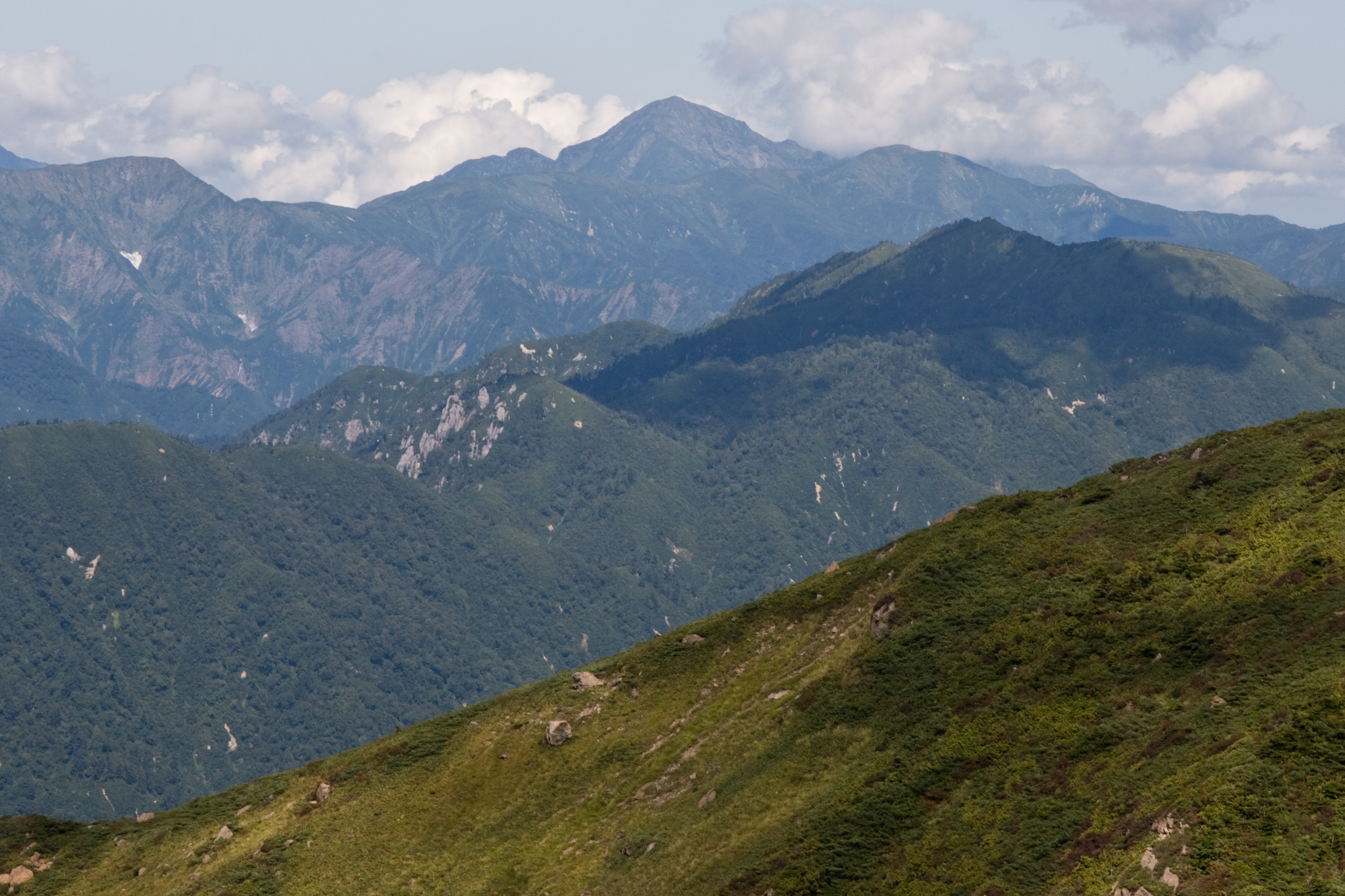
Mount Nakanodake viewed from Mount Shibutsu

One of only eight inland prefectures in Japan, Gunma is the northwesternmost prefecture of the Kantō plain. Except for the central and southeast areas, where most of the population is concentrated, it is mostly mountainous. To the north are Niigata and Fukushima prefectures, while to the east lies Tochigi Prefecture. To the west lies the Nagano Prefecture, and the Saitama Prefecture is to the south.

Some of the major mountains in Gunma are Mount Akagi, Mount Haruna, Mount Myōgi, Mount Nikkō-Shirane and Mount Asama, which is located on the Nagano border. Major rivers include the Tone River, the Agatsuma River, and the Karasu River.

As of 1 April 2012, 14% of the total land area of the prefecture was designated as Natural Parks, namely Jōshin'etsu-kōgen, Nikkō, and Oze National Parks and Myōgi-Arafune-Saku Kōgen Quasi-National Park.

=== Administrative divisions ===
Map of Gunma Prefecture City Town Village

==== Cities ====
Twelve cities are located in Gunma Prefecture:

Name		Area (km^{2})	Population	Map
Rōmaji	Kanji	Area (km^{2})	Population	Map
Annaka	安中市	276.31	57,013	
Fujioka	藤岡市	180.29	64,539	
Isesaki	伊勢崎市	139.44	213,303	
Kiryū	桐生市	274.45	108,991	
Maebashi (capital)	前橋市	311.59	335,352	
Midori	みどり市	208.42	50,266	
Numata	沼田市	443.46	46,908	
Ōta	太田市	175.54	224,358	
Shibukawa	渋川市	240.27	76,098	
Takasaki	高崎市	459.16	372,369	
Tatebayashi	館林市	60.97	74,027	
Tomioka	富岡市	122.85	47,911	

==== Towns and villages ====
These are the towns and villages in each district:

Name		Area (km^{2})	Population	District	Map
Rōmaji	Kanji	Area (km^{2})	Population	District	Map
Chiyoda	千代田町	21.73	11,221	Ōra District	
Higashiagatsuma	東吾妻町	253.91	13,349	Agatsuma District	
Itakura	板倉町	41.86	14,323	Ōra District	
Kanna	神流町	114.6	1,645	Tano District	
Kanra	甘楽町	58.61	12,981	Kanra District	
Katashina	片品村	391.76	4,314	Tone District	
Kawaba	川場村	85.25	3,241	Tone District	
Kusatsu	草津町	49.75	6,255	Agatsuma District	
Meiwa	明和町	19.64	11,154	Ōra District	
Minakami	みなかみ町	781.08	18,383	Tone District	
Naganohara	長野原町	133.85	5,495	Agatsuma District	
Nakanojō	中之条町	439.28	15,571	Agatsuma District	
Nanmoku	南牧村	118.83	1,354	Kanra District	
Ōizumi	大泉町	18.03	41,918	Ōra District	
Ōra	邑楽町	31.11	26,267	Ōra District	
Shimonita	下仁田町	188.38	7,058	Kanra District	
Shintō	榛東村	27.92	14,653	Kitagunma District	
Shōwa	昭和村	64.14	7,228	Tone District	
Takayama	高山村	64.18	6,889	Agatsuma District	
Tamamura	玉村町	25.78	36,367	Sawa District	
Tsumagoi	嬬恋村	337.58	9,546	Agatsuma District	
Ueno	上野村	181.85	1,149	Tano District	
Yoshioka	吉岡町	20.46	21,749	Kitagunma District	

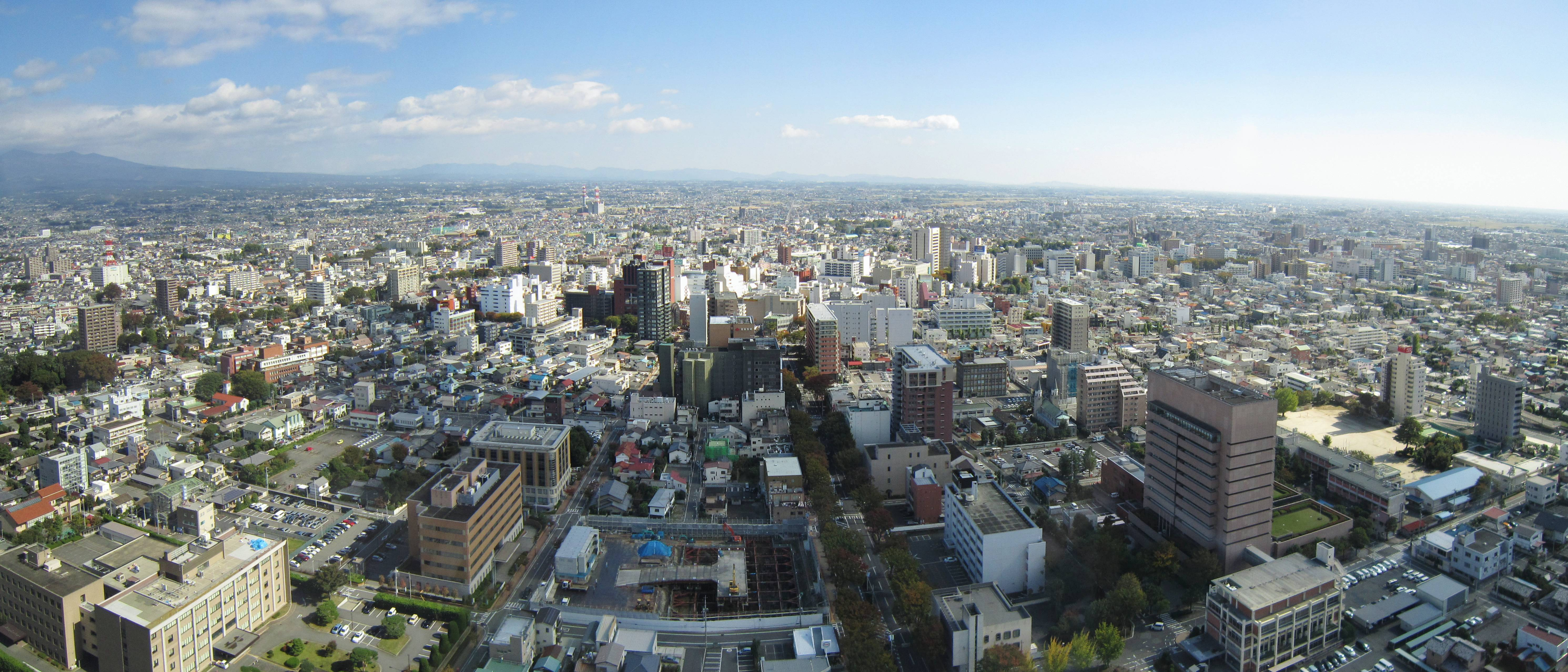
Maebashi

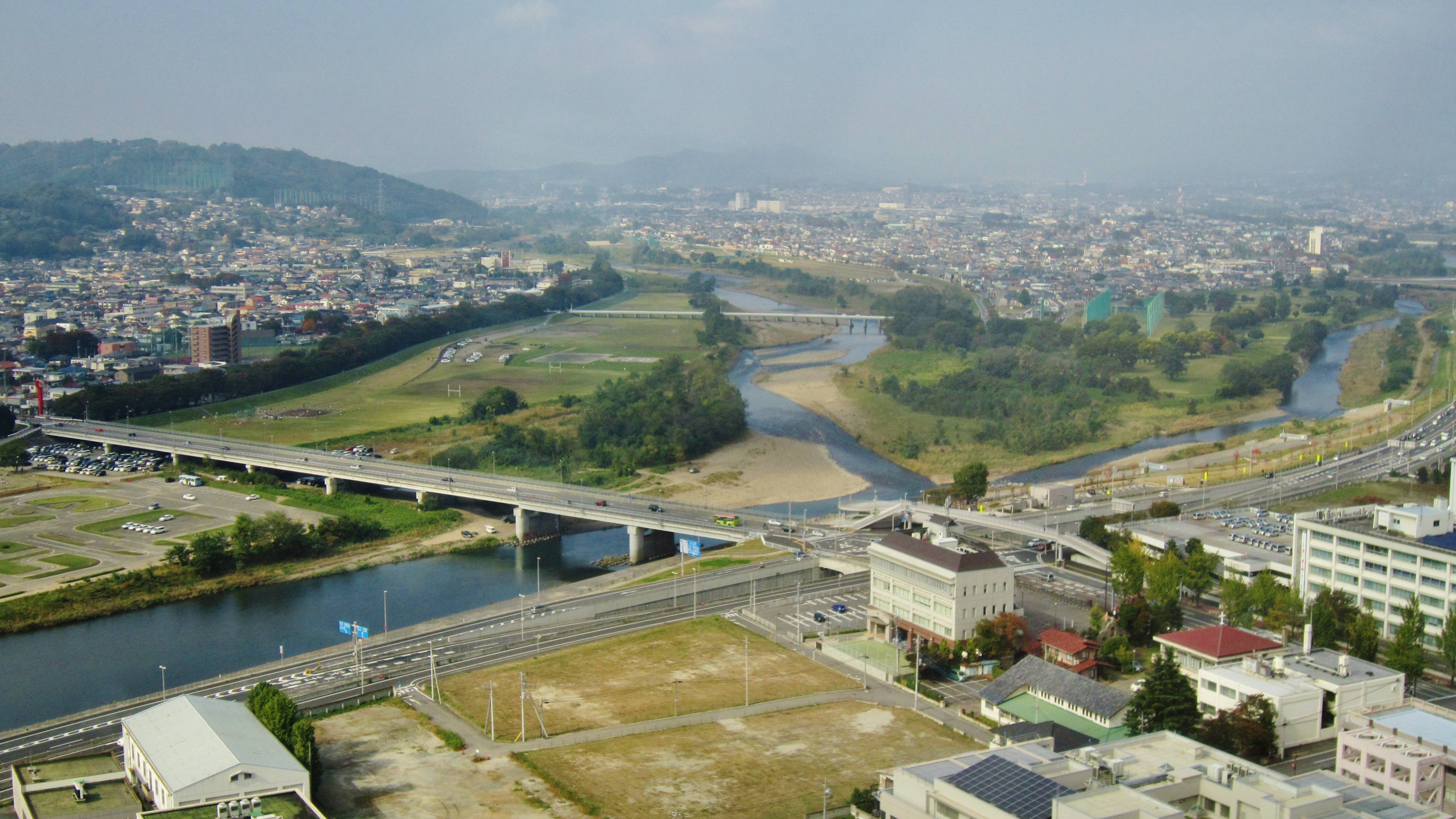
Takasaki

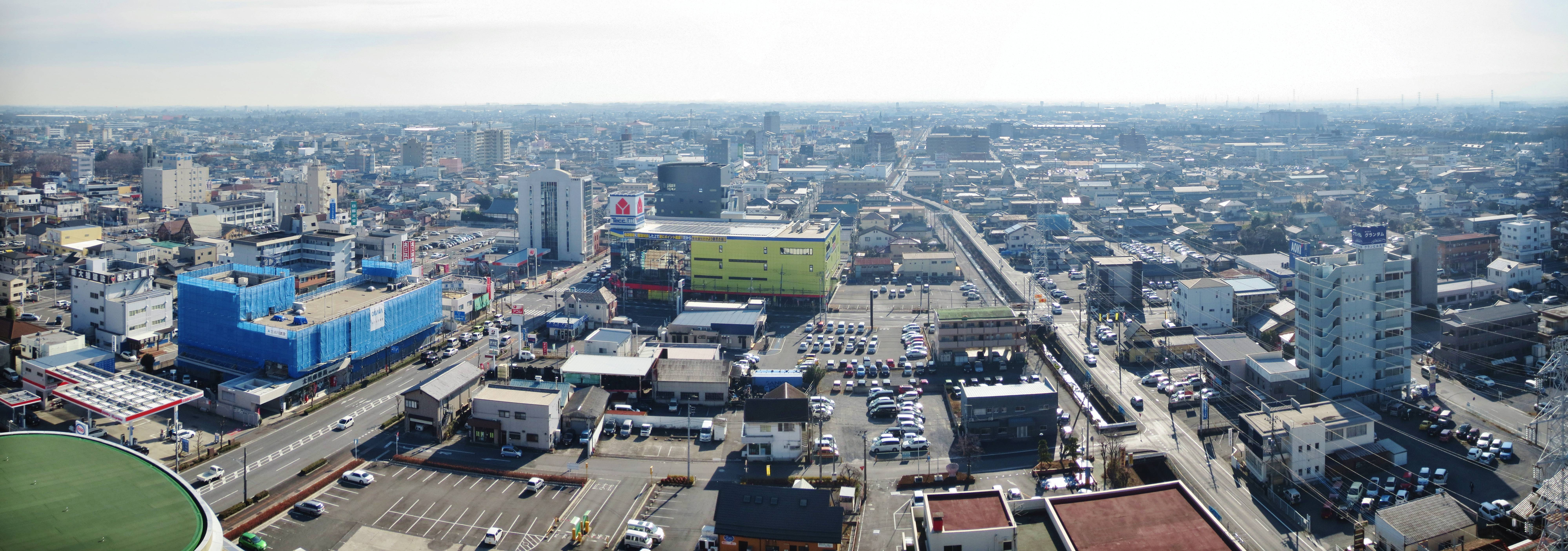
Ōta

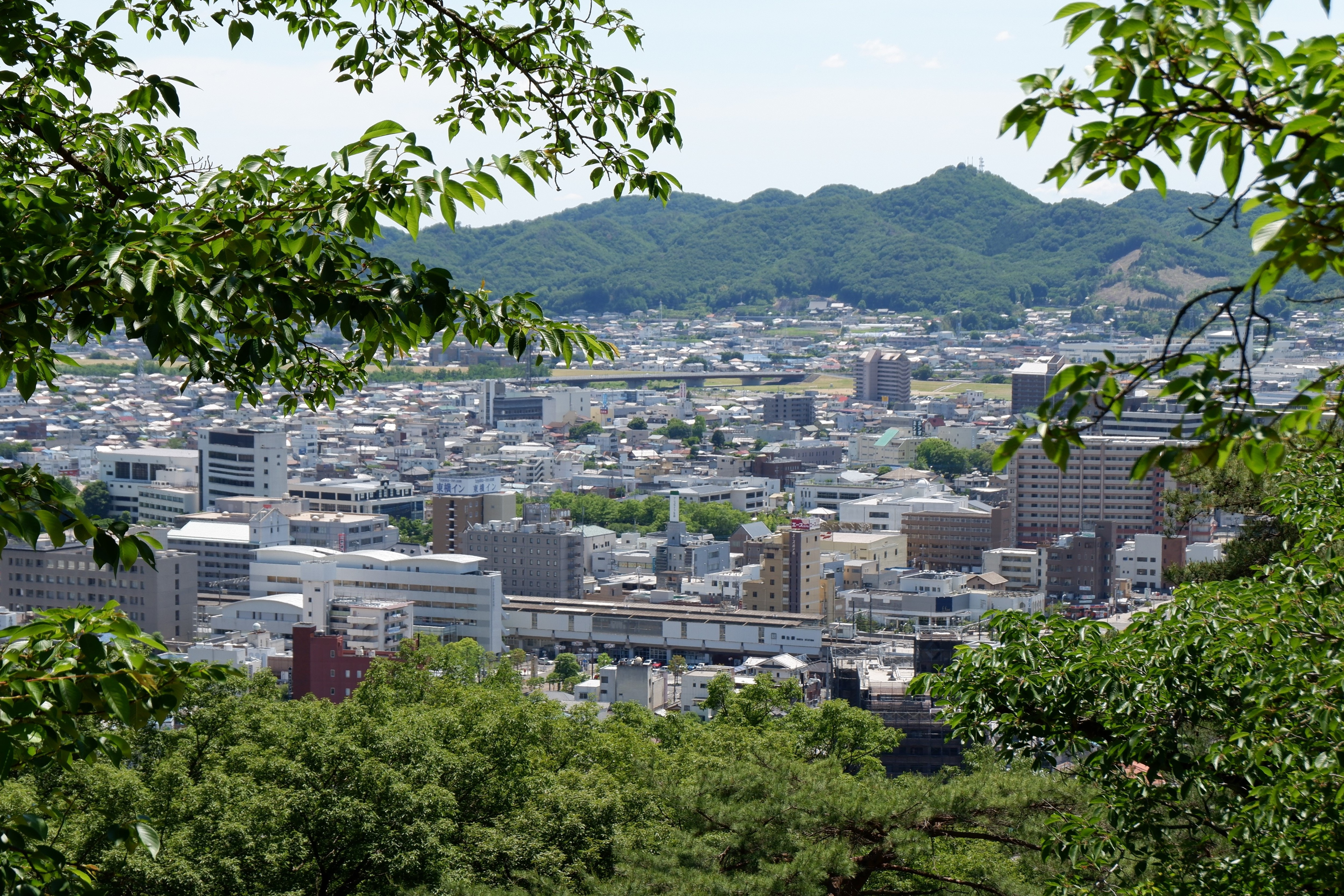
Kiryū

=== Climate ===
Because Gunma is situated in inland Japan, the difference in temperature in the summer compared to the winter is large, and there is less precipitation. This is because of the karakkaze ("empty wind"), a strong, dry wind that occurs in the winter when the snow falls on the coasts of Niigata. The wind carrying clouds with snow are obstructed by the Echigo Mountains, and it also snows there, although the high peaks do not let the wind go past them. For this reason, the wind changes into the kara-kaze. On August 5, 2025, Isesaki a city located in Gunma Prefecture recorded a temperature of 41.8 °C, the hottest temperature ever registered in Japanese history.

- Climate in Maebashi
  - Average yearly precipitation: 1,163 mm (approx. 45.8in)
  - Average yearly temperature: 14.2 degrees Celsius (approx. 57.6 degrees Fahrenheit)

== Demographics ==
Gunma prefecture population pyramid in 2020

Historical population

Year	Pop.	±% p.a.
1920	1,052,610	—
1925	1,118,858	+1.23%
1930	1,186,080	+1.17%
1935	1,242,453	+0.93%
1940	1,299,027	+0.89%
1945	1,546,081	+3.54%
1950	1,601,380	+0.71%
1955	1,613,549	+0.15%
1960	1,578,476	−0.44%
1965	1,605,584	+0.34%
1970	1,658,909	+0.66%

Year	Pop.	±% p.a.
1975	1,756,480	+1.15%
1980	1,848,562	+1.03%
1985	1,921,259	+0.77%
1990	1,966,265	+0.46%
1995	2,003,540	+0.38%
2000	2,024,852	+0.21%
2005	2,023,996	−0.01%
2010	2,008,068	−0.16%
2015	1,973,115	−0.35%
2020	1,939,110	−0.35%

Source: Censuses

== Economy ==
Gunma's modern industries include transport equipment and electrical equipment, concentrated around Maebashi and the eastern region nearest Tokyo. More traditional industries include sericulture and agriculture. Gunma's major agricultural products include cabbages and konnyaku. Gunma produces over 90% of Japan's konnyaku, and two-thirds of the farms in the village of Tsumagoi are cabbage farms. Also, the city of Ōta is famous for the car industry, notably the Subaru factory.

== Culture ==
There is a local dialect, known in Japanese as 'gunma-ben' or 'jōshū-ben'.

Gunma has a traditional card game called Jomo Karuta (上毛かるた). It features people, places, and things of regional and/or cultural importance.

=== Famous foods ===
In 2007, the Ministry of Agriculture, Forestry and Fisheries held an event to find the top 100 best local dishes across all of Japan. Three dishes were featured from Gunma; yaki-manju, okkirikomi, and konnyaku.

=== Melody roads ===
As of 2018, Gunma is home to eleven of Japan's over thirty Melody roads. 2,559 grooves cut into a 175-meter stretch of the road surface in transmit a tactile vibration through the wheels into the car body. The roads can be found in Katashina, Minakami, Takayama, Kanna, Ueno, Kusatsu, Tsumagoi, Nakanojo, Takasaki, Midori, and Maebashi. Each is of a differing length and plays a different song. Naganohara also used to be home to a Melody Road playing "Aj lučka, lučka široká", though the road in question was paved over in 2013 due to noise complaints.

==== Songs ====
- Kusatsu - "Kusatsu-Bushi"
- Takayama - "When You Wish Upon a Star"
- Tsumagoi - "Oh My Darling Clementine"
- Nakanojo - "Always With Me" (Japanese title: いつも何度でも, itsumo nando demo) from Spirited Away when driven at 40 km/h
- Katashina - "Memories of Summer" when driven over at 50 km/h

== Government ==
=== List of governors of Gunma Prefecture (1947–present) ===
Governor	Term start	Term end
Shigeo Kitano (北野重雄)	12 April 1947	25 June 1948
Yoshio Iyoku (伊能芳雄)	10 August 1948	4 July 1952
Shigeo Kitano	2 August 1952	1 August 1956
Toshizo Takekoshi (竹腰俊蔵)	2 August 1956	1 August 1960
Konroku Kanda (神田坤六)	2 August 1960	1 August 1976
Ichiro Shimizu (清水一郎)	2 August 1976	12 June 1991
Hiroyuki Kodera (小寺弘之)	28 July 1991	27 July 2007
Masaaki Osawa (大澤正明)	28 July 2007	27 July 2019
Ichita Yamamoto (山本一太)	28 July 2019	present

== Education ==
=== Universities ===
- Isesaki
  - Jobu University – Isesaki Campus
  - Tokyo University of Social Welfare – Isesaki Campus
- Maebashi
  - Gunma University
  - Maebashi Institute of Technology
- Midori
  - Kiryu University
- Ota
  - Kanto Gakuen University
- Takasaki
  - Gunma Paz College
  - Jobu University -Takasaki Campus
  - Takasaki City University of Economics
  - Takasaki University of Commerce
  - Takasaki University of Health and Welfare
- Tamamura
  - Gunma Prefectural Women's University

== Sports ==
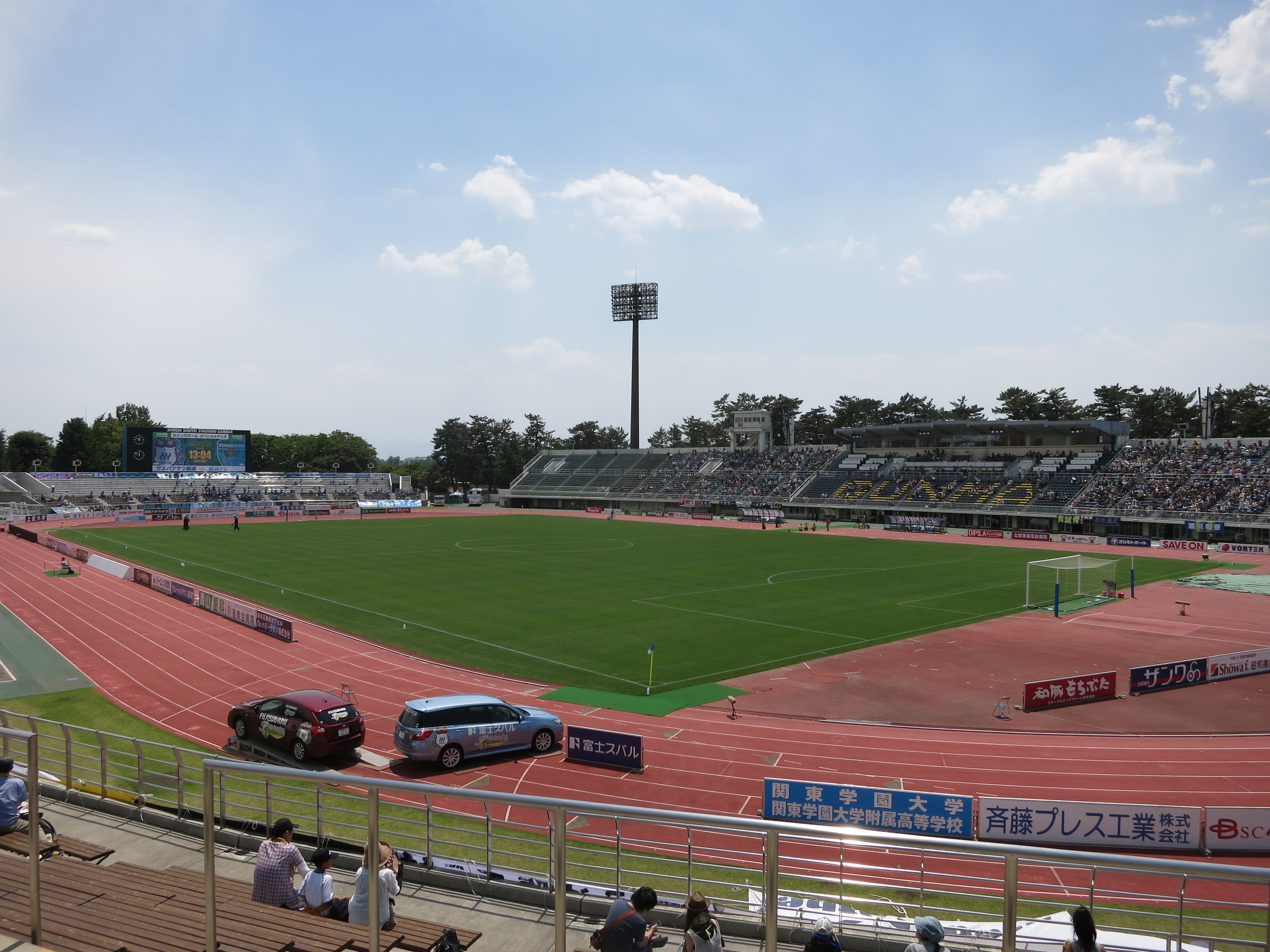
Shoda Shoyu Stadium Gunma, home of Thespa Gunma.

The sports teams listed below are based in Gunma.

=== Baseball ===
- Gunma Diamond Pegasus

=== Association football ===
- Thespa Gunma (Maebashi)
- Tonan Maebashi (Maebashi)

=== Rugby ===
- Panasonic Wild Knights (Ota)

=== Basketball ===
- Gunma Crane Thunders

Gunma is also famous for its ski resorts in the mountains.

Gunma was the only prefecture in Japan to have all 4 legal types of gambling on races: horse, bicycle, auto and boat. This changed with the closing of the last horse race track in Takasaki in 2004.

== Tourism ==
Gunma has many hot spring resorts and the most famous is Kusatsu Onsen. Another draw to the mountainous Gunma is the ski resorts.

Other attractions include:

- Fukiware Falls
- Hara Museum Arc
- Ikaho Sistina Trick Art Museum
- Kusatsu Alpine-Plant Museum
- Kusatsu Hot-Spring Museum
- Konnyaku Park
- Lake Nozori
- Mount Akagi
- Mount Haruna
- Mount Kusatsu-Shirane
- Mount Myōgi
- Mount Tanigawa
- Rinkokaku
- The Museum of Modern Art, Gunma
- Sankenkyō
- Shorinzan Daruma Temple
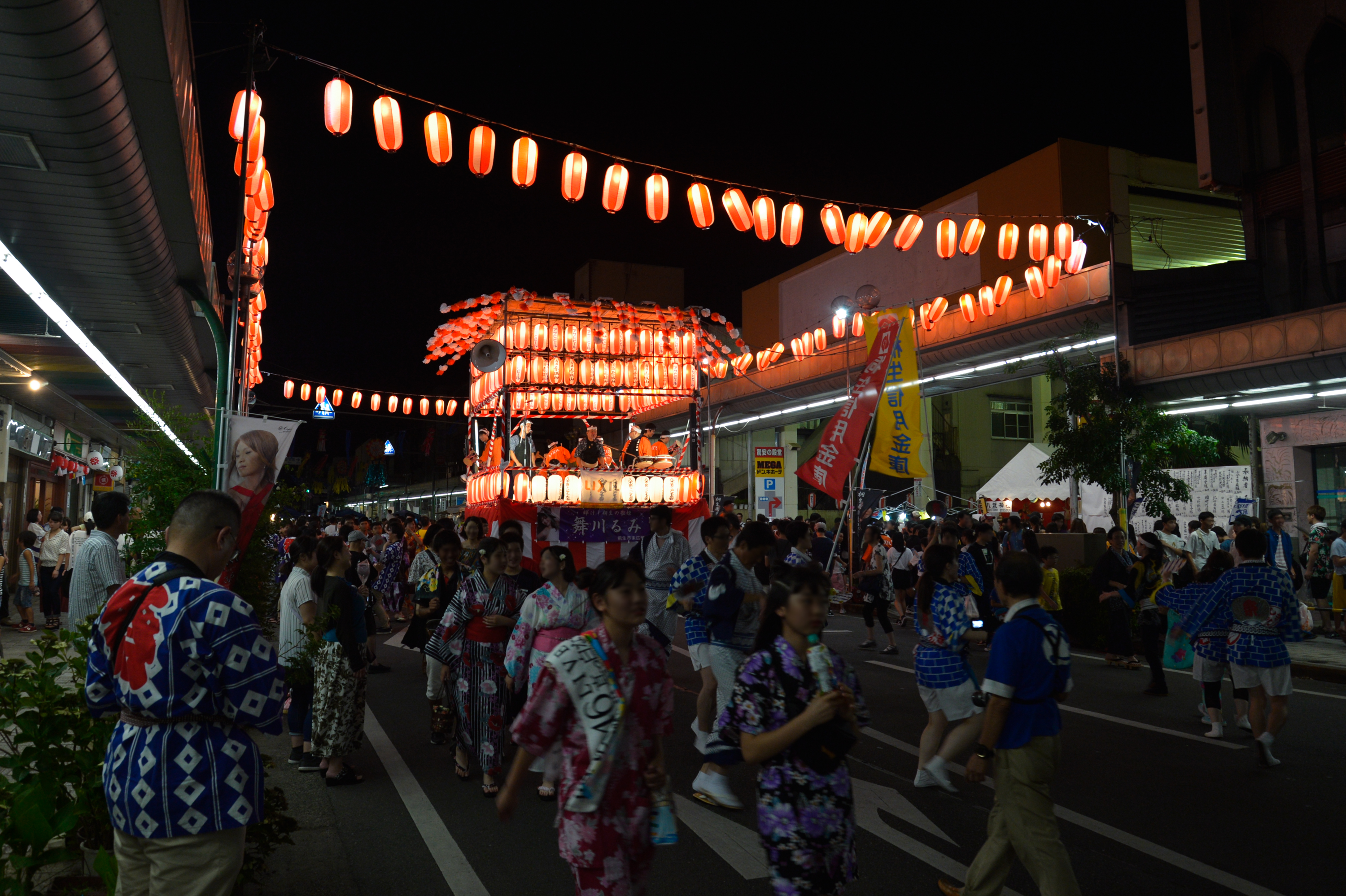
Kiryū Yagi-bushi Festival, held every year in early August.

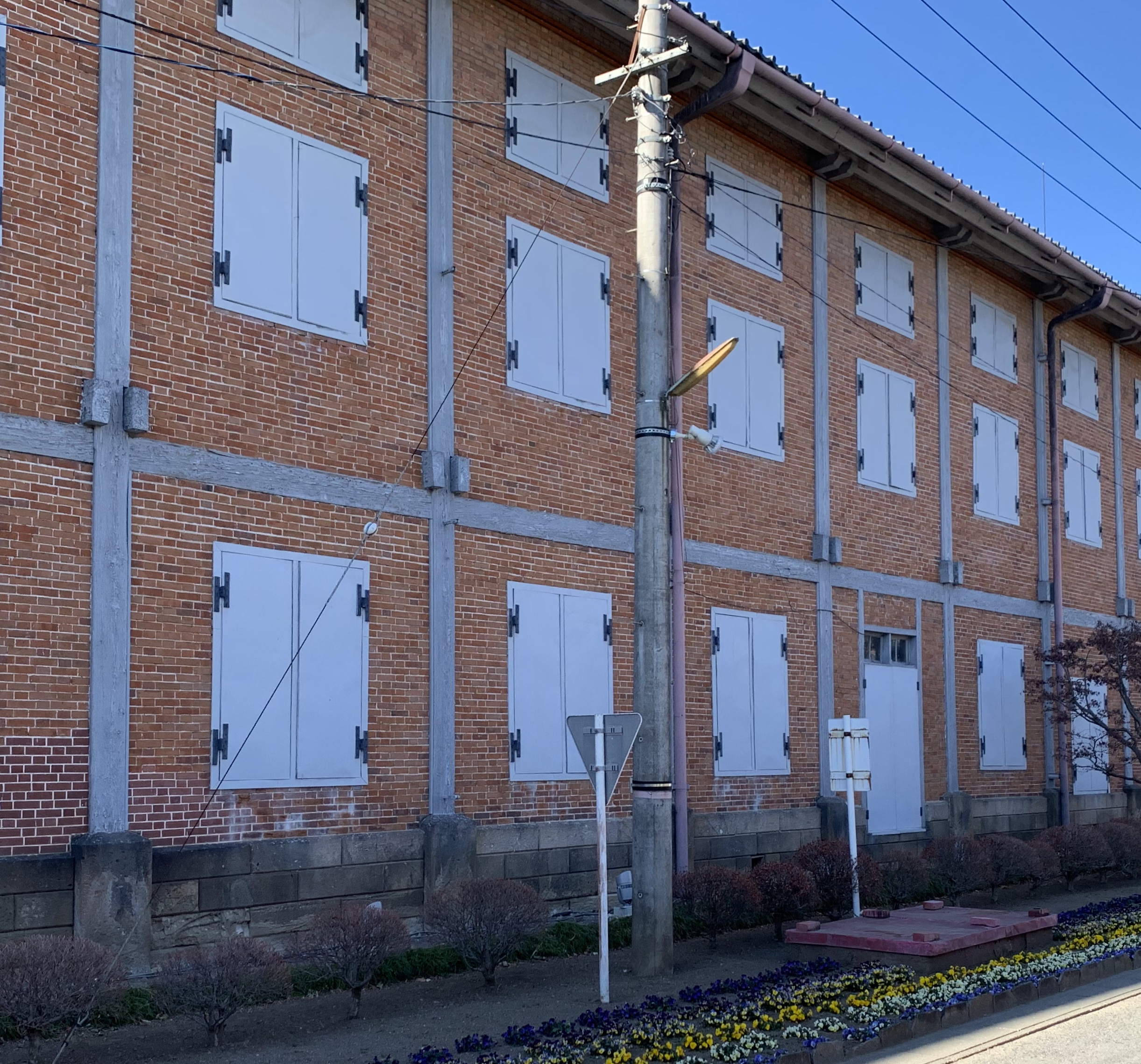
A Tomioka Silk Mill, a World Heritage cultural property site.

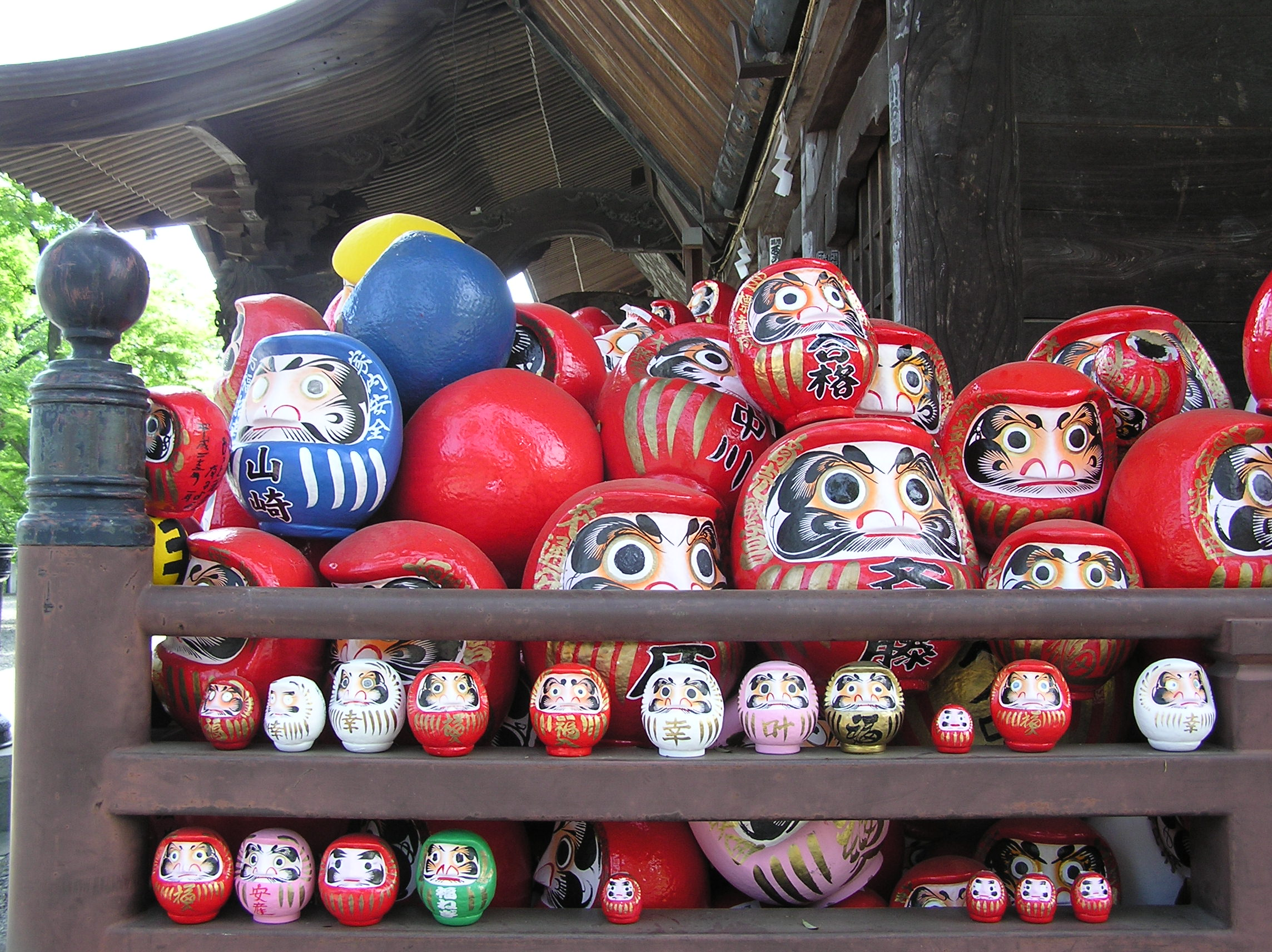
Daruma dolls at Shorinzan Daruma Temple in Takasaki

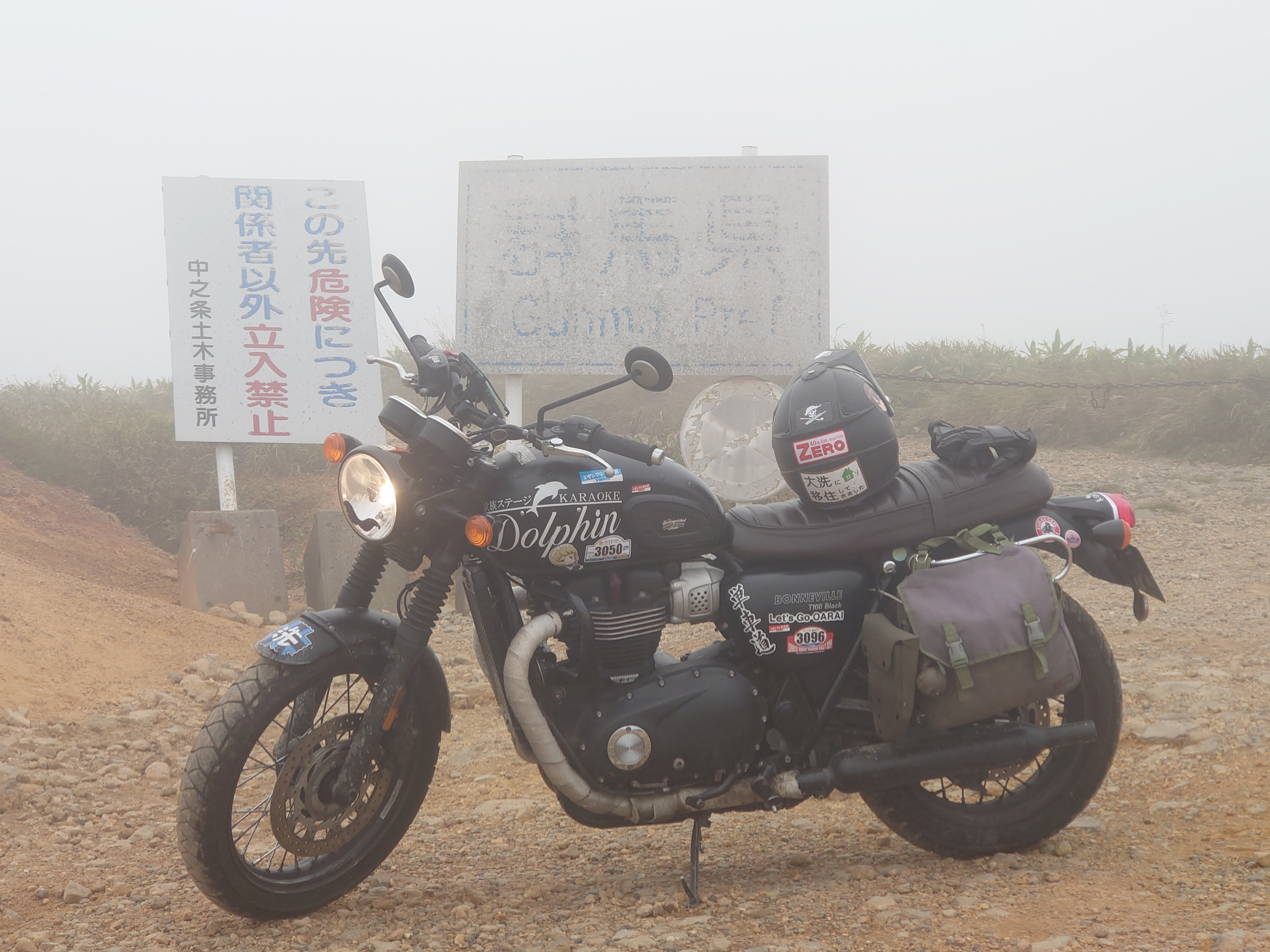
Kenashi Pass on the border of Nagano Prefecture is famous on the internet

Rinkokaku

== Transportation ==
=== Rail ===
- Jomo Electric Railway (Chuo Maebashi-Nishi Kiryu)
- Joshin Electric Railway (Takasaki-Shimonita)
- JR East
  - Agatsuma Line
  - Hachiko Line (Kuragano-Hachioji)
  - Hokuriku Shinkansen
  - Joetsu Line
  - Joetsu Shinkansen
  - Ryomo Line
  - Shinetsu Line (Takasaki-Yokokawa)
  - Takasaki Line
- Tobu Railway
  - Isesaki Line
  - Kiryu Line
  - Nikko Line (Itakura Tōyōdai-mae Station)
  - Sano Line
- Watarase Keikoku Railway Watarase Keikoku Line

=== Roads ===
==== Expressways ====
- Jōshin-etsu Expressway
- Kan-Etsu Expressway
- Kita-Kantō Expressway (Takasaki-Hitachinaka)
- Tōhoku Expressway

==== National highways ====
- National Route 17 (Nihonbashi of Tokyo-Saitama-Kumagaya-Takasaki-Shibukawa-Ojiya-Nagaoka)
- National Route 18 (Takasaki-Annaka-Karuizawa-Komoro-Nagano-Myoko-Joetsu)
- National Route 50 (Maebashi-Isesaki-Oyama-Yuki-Mito)
- National Route 120
- National Route 122
- National Route 144
- National Route 145
- National Route 146
- National Route 254
- National Route 291
- National Route 292
- National Route 299
- National Route 353
- National Route 354
- National Route 405
- National Route 406
- National Route 407
- National Route 462

== Prefectural symbols ==
The prefectural symbol consists of the first kanji of the word 'Gunma' surrounded by three stylized mountains symbolizing the three important mountains of Gunma Prefecture: Mount Haruna, Mount Akagi, and Mount Myōgi.

For marketing, the Prefectural Government also uses Gunma-chan, a small super deformed drawing of a horse character wearing a green cap. It is used on promotional posters, banners, and other notable printed materials from the Prefectural Government. Other agencies and companies formally or informally use variations of its likeness and other horse-shaped characters when making signs or notices for work on buildings, roads, and other public notices.

== In popular culture ==
There are various manga and anime that have based their settings in Gunma, such as:

- A Place Further than the Universe
- The Flowers of Evil
- Initial D
- Maebashi Witches
- Nichijou
- You Don't Know Gunma Yet

In Zom 100: Bucket List of the Dead, the main character Akira Tendo is from Gunma Prefecture.

== See also ==
- 2022 Japan heatwave
- Category:People from Gunma Prefecture
