= Ino Station (Gunma) =

Railway station in Takasaki, Gunma Prefecture, Japan

Ino Station 井野駅
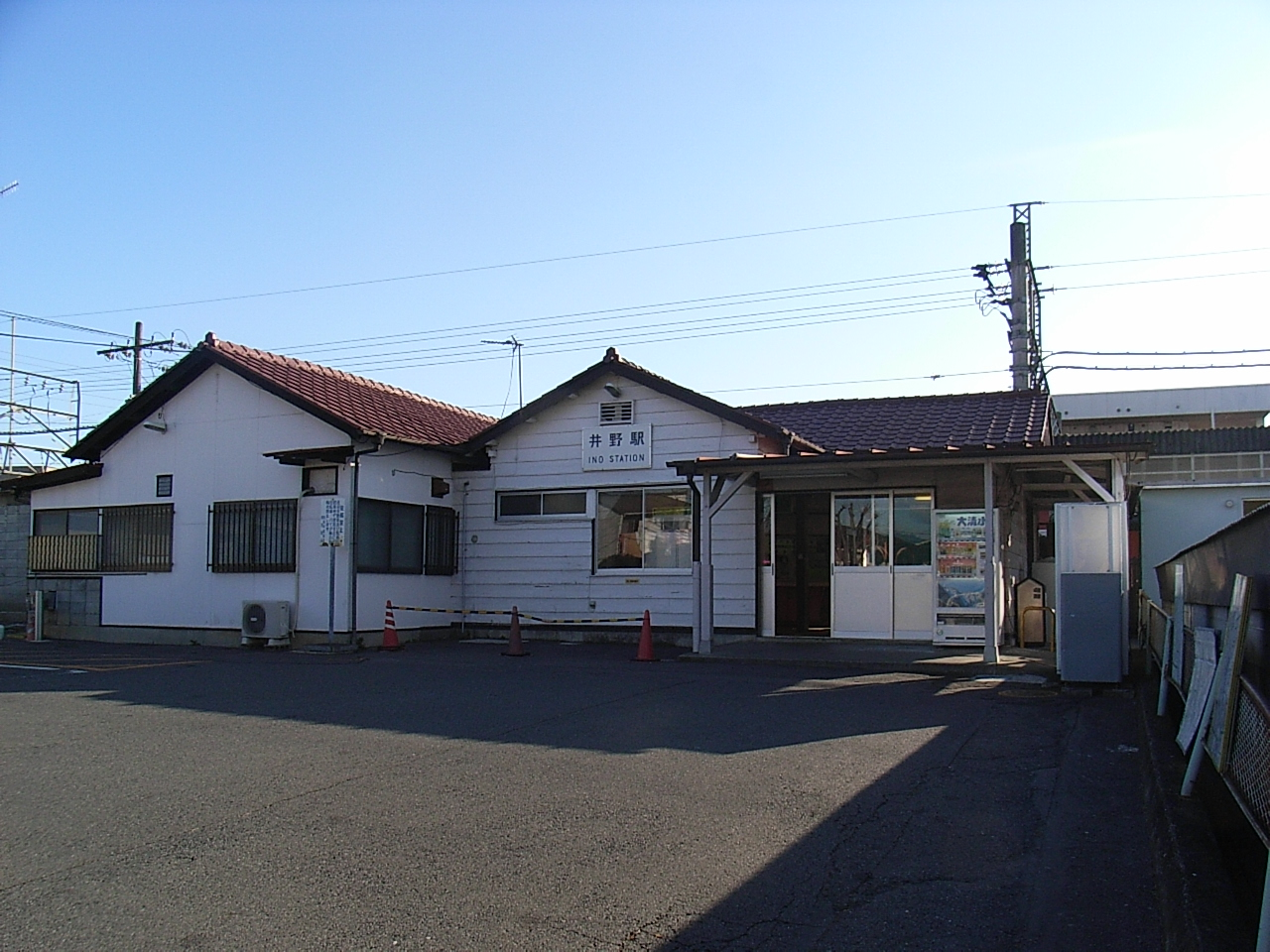
- Ino Station building, December 2006

General information
- Location: Inomachi, Takasaki-shi, Gunma-ken 370-0004; Japan
- Coordinates: 36°21′26″N 139°01′23″E
- Operator: JR East
- Lines: Ryōmō Line; Jōetsu Line; Agatsuma Line
- Distance: 4.0 km (2.5 mi) from Takasaki
- Platforms: 2 side platforms

Other information
- Status: Staffed
- Website: Official website

History
- Opened: 20 December 1957; 68 years ago

Passengers
- FY2022: 1,946 daily

Services
Preceding station	JR East	Following station
Takasakitonyamachi towards Takasaki	Jōetsu Line	Shin-Maebashi towards Nagaoka
Takasakitonyamachi towards Takasaki	Agatsuma Line	Shin-Maebashi towards Ōmae
Takasakitonyamachi towards Takasaki	Ryōmō Line	Shin-Maebashi towards Oyama
Takasakitonyamachi towards Tokyo	Takasaki Line Local; Ryōmō Line through-service	Shin-Maebashi towards Maebashi
Takasakitonyamachi towards Odawara	Shōnan–Shinjuku Line Rapid	Shin-Maebashi towards Maebashi
Location
- Location within Gunma Prefecture Location within Japan

Ino Station (井野駅, Ino-eki) is a railway station in the city of Takasaki, Gunma, Japan, operated by the East Japan Railway Company (JR East).

== Lines ==
Ino Station is served by the Joetsu Line, and is 4.0 km (2.5 mi) from the starting point of the line at Takasaki, and 161.6 km (100.4 mi) from Nagaoka Station. The preceding station of Takasakitonyamachi is 1.2 km (0.75 mi) away and the following station of Shin-Maebashi is 3.3 km (2.1 mi) away. It is also served by through services to and from the Agatsuma Line and the Ryōmō Line.

== Station layout ==
The station consists of two opposed side platforms serving two tracks, connected to the station building by a footbridge. Ino Station has a Braille fare table, and no other accessibility features.

=== Platforms ===
1	■ Jōetsu Line	for Shibukawa, Minakami, and Nagaoka
1	■ Agatsuma Line	for Nakanojō and Naganohara-Kusatsuguchi
1	■ Ryōmō Line	for Maebashi, Kiryū and Oyama
2	■ Jōetsu Line	for Takasaki
2	Shōnan-Shinjuku Line	for Takasaki, Shinjuku and Yokohama
2	Takasaki Line via (Ueno-Tokyo Line)	for Takasaki, Tokyo and Yokohama

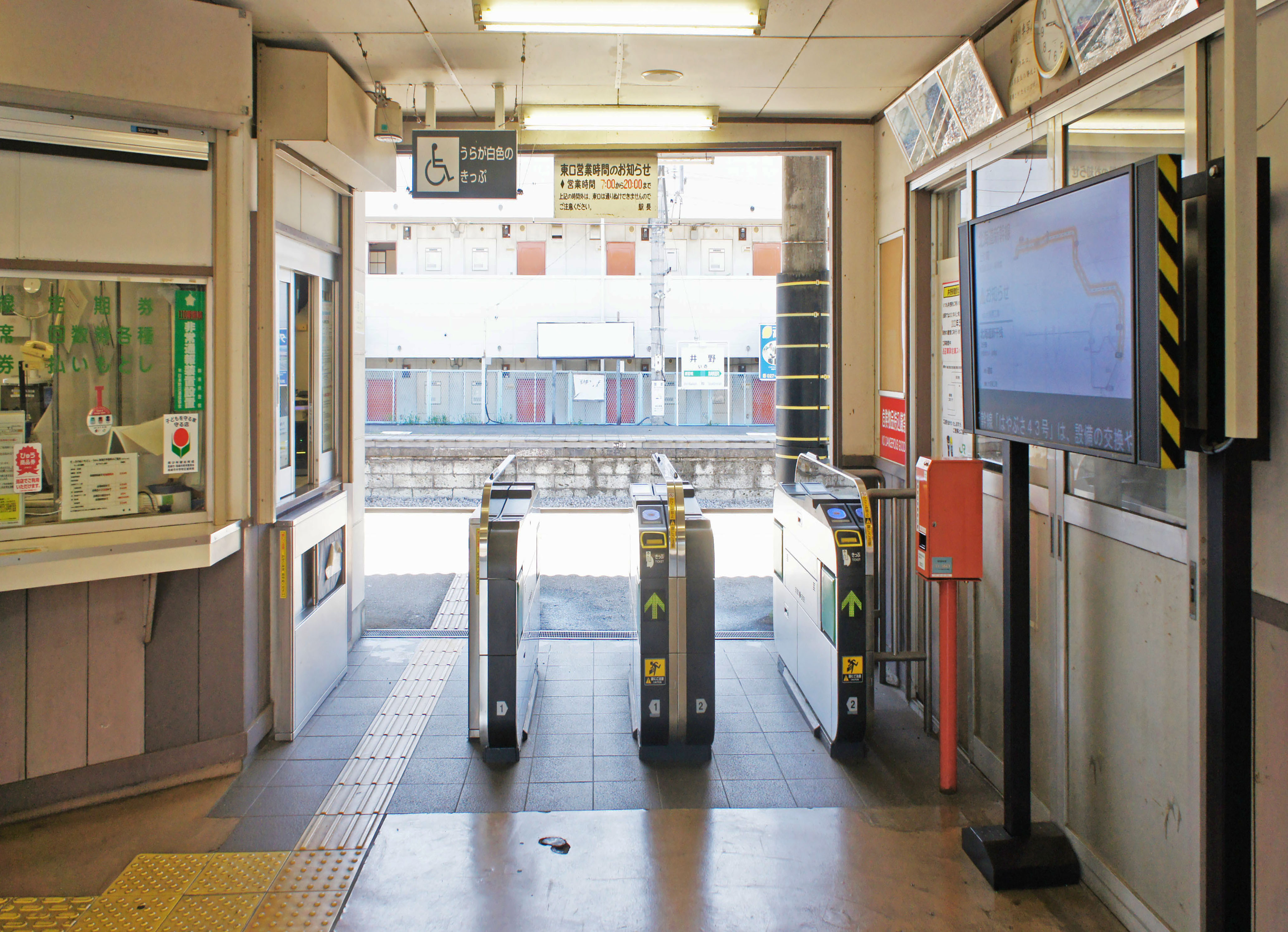
Ticket Gate July 2021

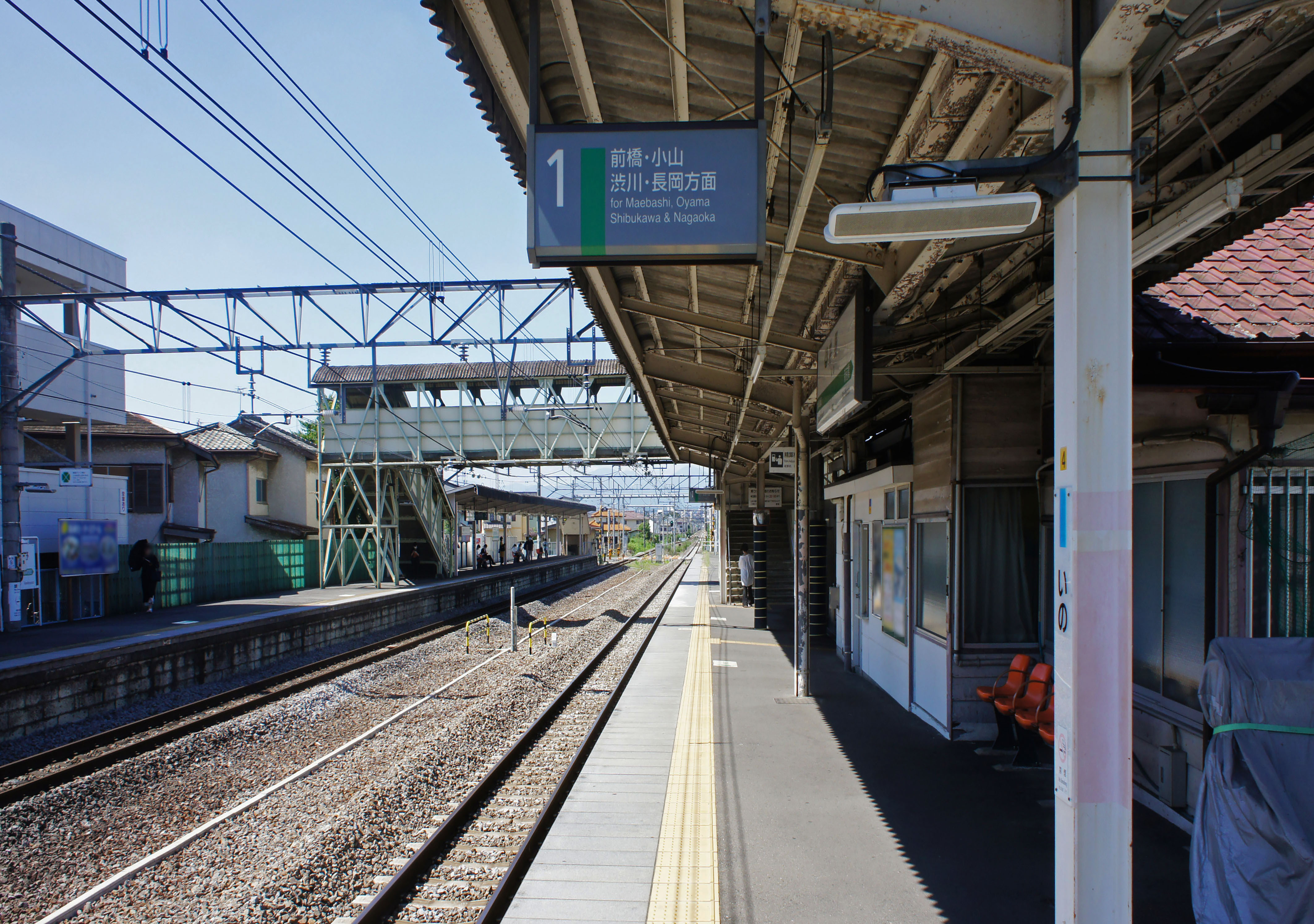
Platform July 2021

== History ==
The site of the station was first used as a signal station from 11 October 1944 until 20 December 1957 when the station was opened. Upon the privatization of the Japanese National Railways (JNR) on 1 April 1987, it came under the control of JR East.

The station started accepting Suica cards on 18 November 2001. The Midori no Madoguchi ticket office was closed on 30 November 2021.

== Passenger statistics ==
In fiscal 2022, the station was used by an average of 1,946 passengers daily (boarding passengers only).

Below is table containing the passenger statistics since the year 2000:

Passenger statistics
Year	Average Daily Boarding Passengers	Year	Average Daily Boarding Passengers	Year	Average Daily Boarding Passengers
2000	3,134	2010	2,042	2020	1,649
2001	2,955	2011	2,036	2021	1,809
2002	2,888	2012	2,024	2022	1,946
2003	2,789	2013	2,118		
2004	2,809	2014	2,059		
2005	2,529	2015	2,090		
2006	2,422	2016	2,102		
2007	2,265	2017	2,129		
2008	2,230	2018	2,181		
2009	2,123	2019	2,155		

== Surrounding area ==
- National Route 17
- Takasaki Ino Post Office

== See also ==
- List of railway stations in Japan
