= Kunisada Station =

Railway station in Isesaki, Gunma Prefecture, Japan

Kunisada Station 国定駅
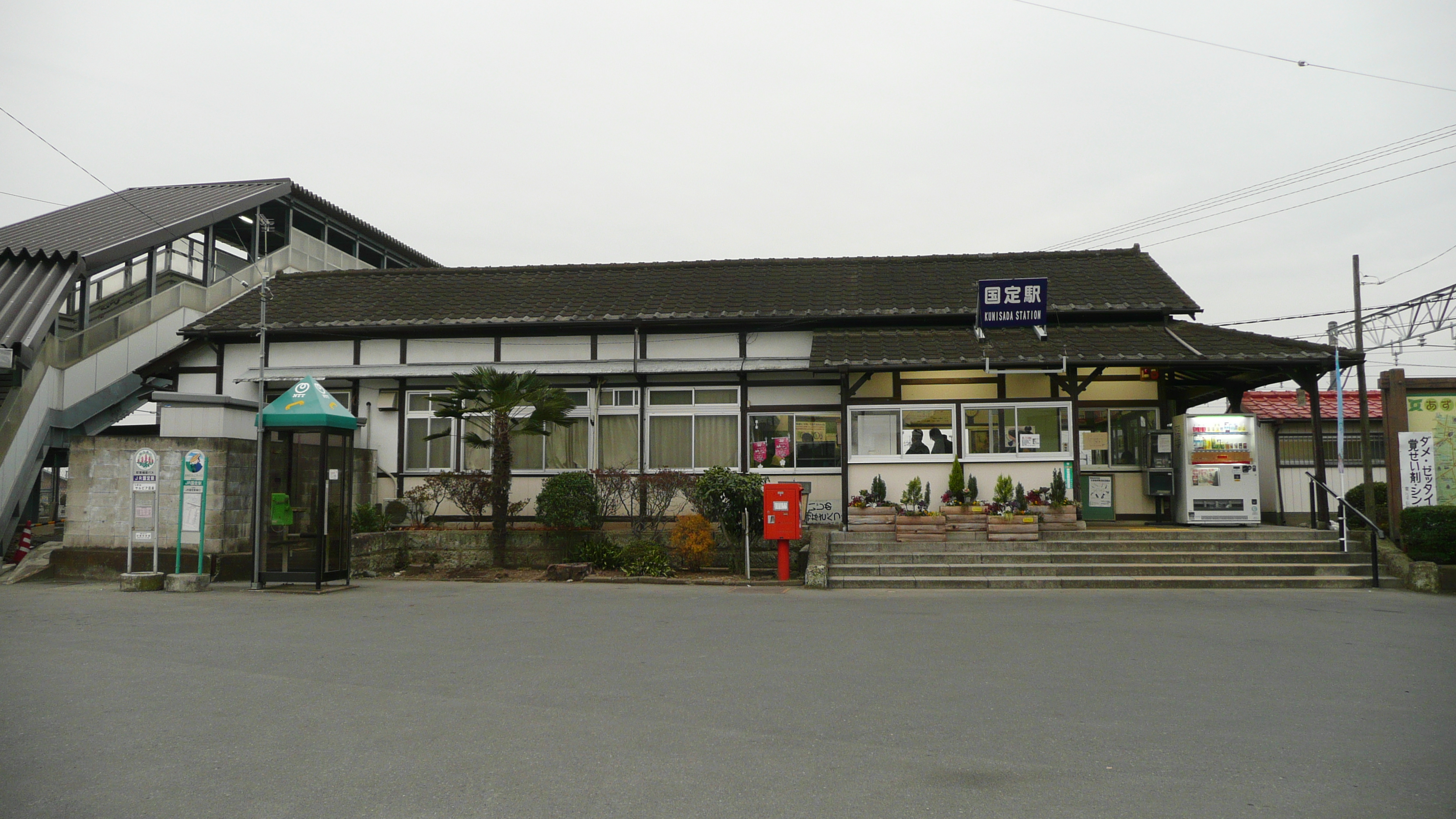
- Kunisada Station, December 2007

General information
- Location: 2 Kunisada-cho, Isesaki-shi, Gunma-ken 379-2221; Japan
- Coordinates: 36.3589°N 139.2426°E
- Operator: JR East
- Line: ■ Ryōmō Line
- Distance: 63.3 km from Oyama
- Platforms: 1 side + 1 island platform

Other information
- Status: Staffed
- Website: Official website

History
- Opened: 20 November 1889; 136 years ago

Passengers
- FY2021: 1,285 daily

Services
Preceding station	JR East	Following station
Isesaki towards Takasaki	Ryōmō Line	Iwajuku towards Oyama
Location
- Location within Gunma Prefecture Location within Japan

Kunisada Station (国定駅, Kunisada-eki) is a passenger railway station in the city of Isesaki, Gunma Prefecture, Japan, operated by East Japan Railway Company (JR East).

== Lines ==
Kunisada Station is served by the Ryōmō Line, and is located 63.3 km from the terminus of the line at Oyama Station, and 28.4 km from Takasaki Station. The preceding station of Iwajuku is 6.4 km away and the following station of Isesaki is 5.8 km away.

== Station layout ==
The station consists of one side platform and one island platform connected by a footbridge. The station is staffed. Kunisada Station has no accessibility features.

=== Platforms ===
1	■ Ryōmō Line	for Kiryū and Oyama
2, 3	■ Ryōmō Line	for Isesaki, Maebashi, and Takasaki

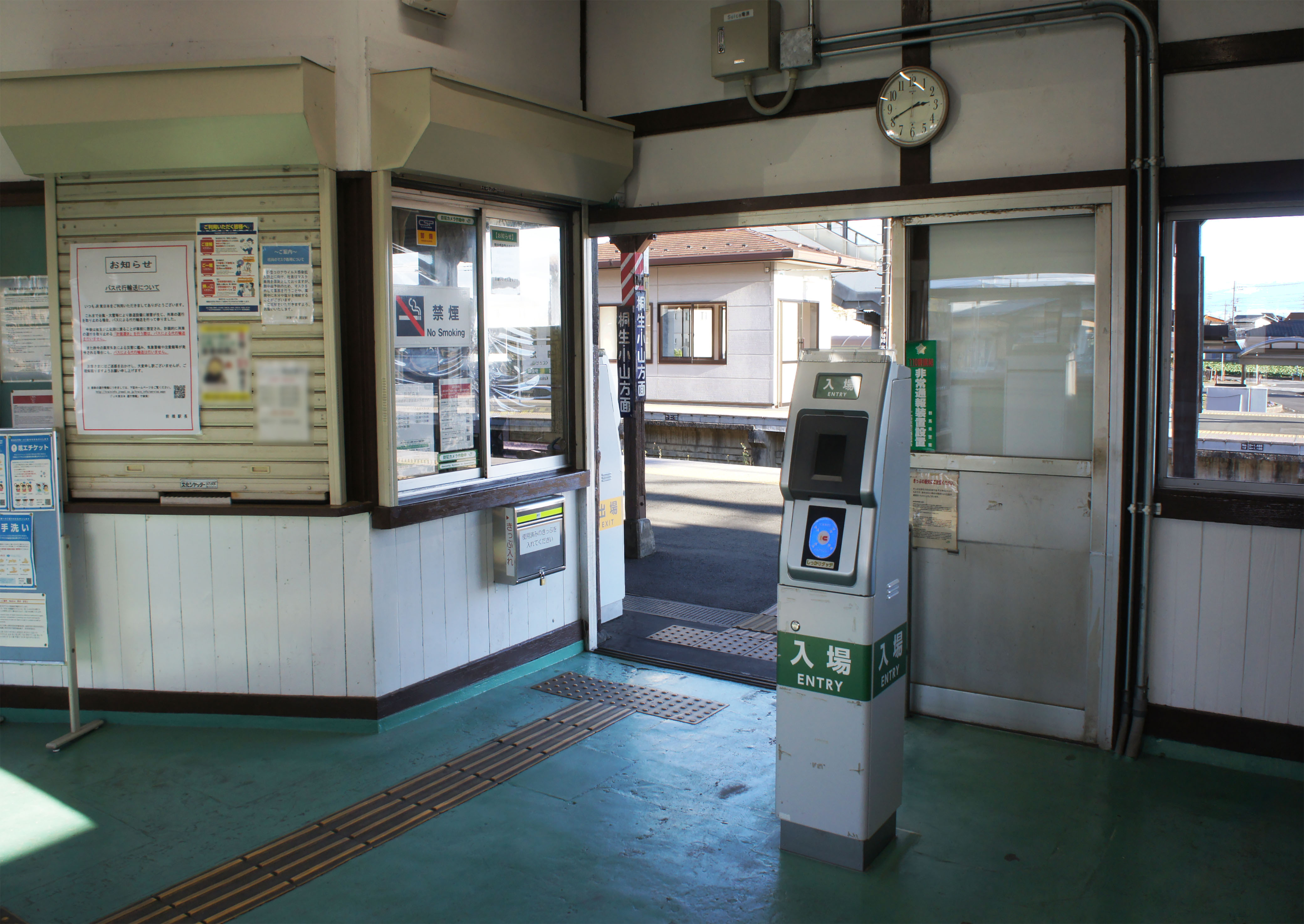
Ticket GateNovember 2021

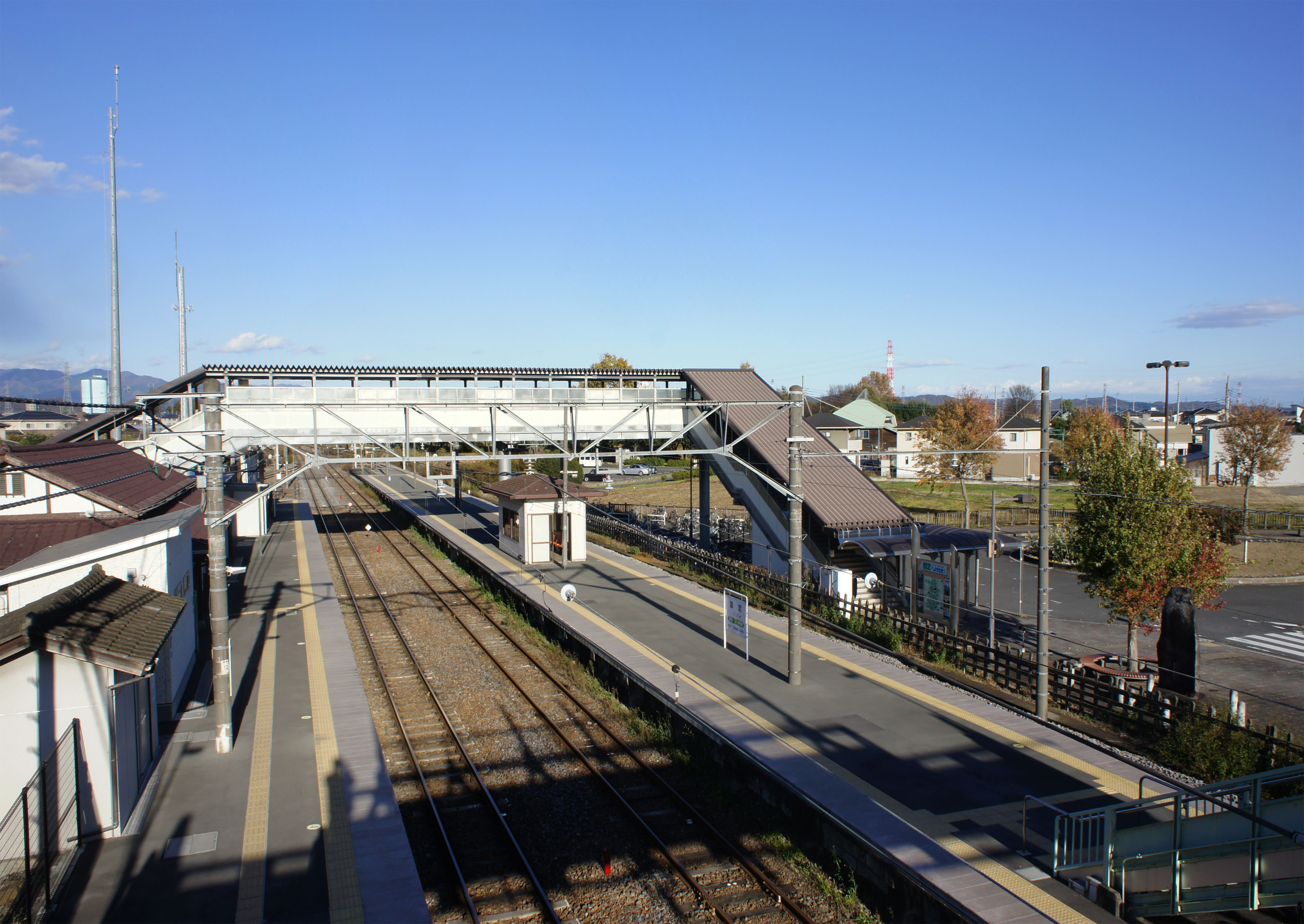
Platforms November 2021

== History ==
Kunisada Station was opened on 20 November 1889. The station was absorbed into the JR East network upon the privatization of the Japanese National Railways (JNR) on 1 April 1987. The station started accepting Suica cards on November 18, 2001.

== Passenger statistics ==
In fiscal 2021, the station was used by an average of 1,285 passengers daily (boarding passengers only).

Below is table containing the passenger statistics since the year 2000:

Passenger statistics
Year	Average Daily Boarding Passengers	Year	Average Daily Boarding Passengers	Year	Average Daily Boarding Passengers
2000	1,211	2010	1,296	2020	1,161
2001	1,185	2011	1,317	2021	1,285
2002	1,153	2012	1,405		
2003	1,204	2013	1,438		
2004	1,212	2014	1,469		
2005	1,208	2015	1,564		
2006	1,219	2016	1,564		
2007	1,271	2017	1,583		
2008	1,305	2018	1,594		
2009	1,311	2019	1,564		

== Surrounding area ==
- Grave of Kunisada Chūji
- Kunisada Post Office
- Former Azuma village hall
- Gunma Prefectural Psychiatric Medical Center
- Kokutei Park

== See also ==
- List of railway stations in Japan
