= Takasakitonyamachi Station =

Railway station in Takasaki, Gunma Prefecture, Japan

Takasaki Tonyamachi Station 高崎問屋町駅
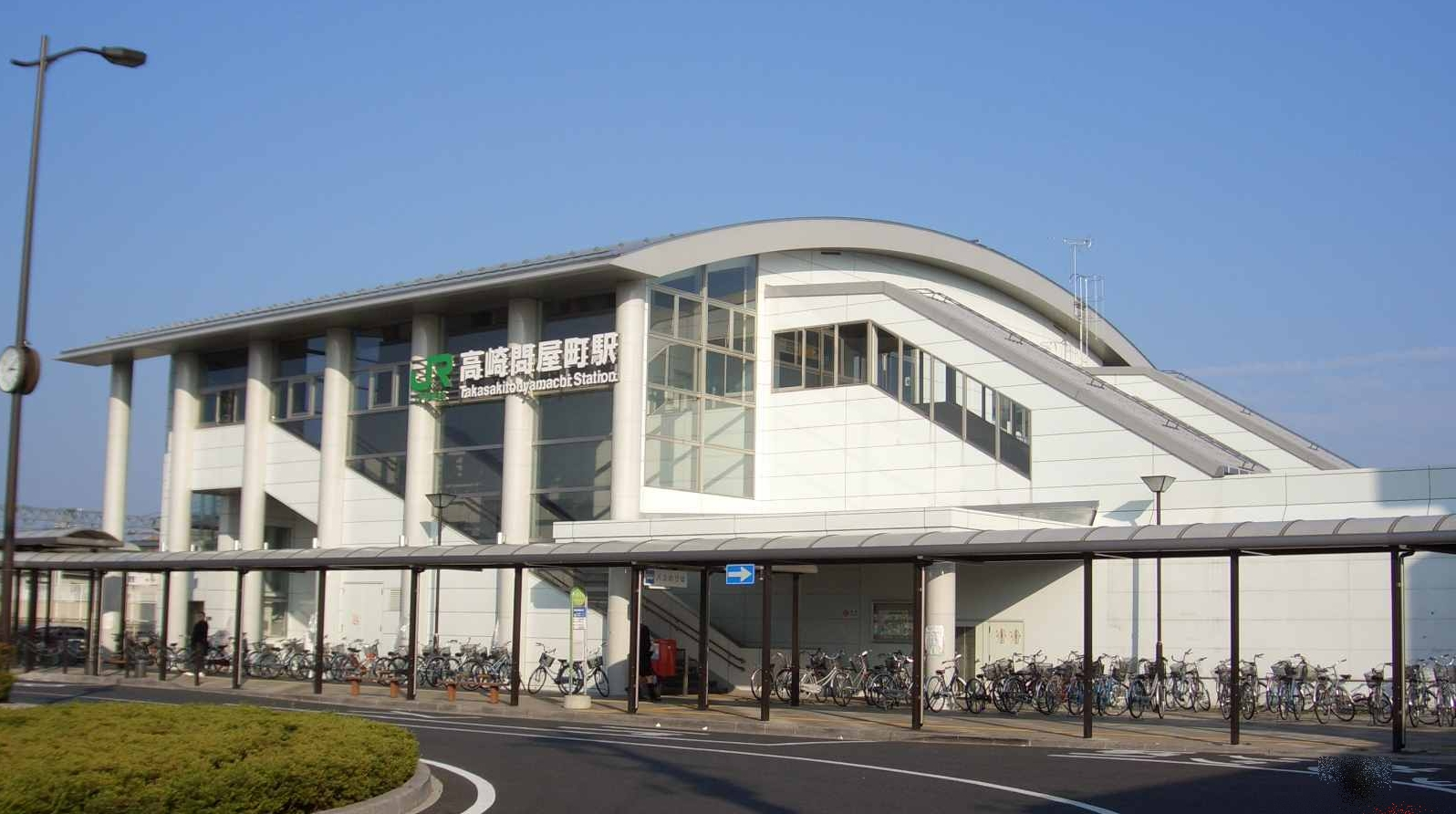
- West ("Tonya") entrance of Takasaki Tonyamachi Station

General information
- Location: Kaizawa-machi, Takasaki-shi, Gunma-ken 370–0042; Japan
- Coordinates: 36.3463°N 139.0171°E
- Operator: JR East
- Lines: ■ Ryōmō Line; ■ Jōetsu Line; ■ Agatsuma Line
- Distance: 2.8 km from Takasaki
- Platforms: 2 side platforms

Other information
- Status: Staffed (Midori no Madoguchi )
- Website: Official website

History
- Opened: 16 October 2004; 21 years ago

Passengers
- FY2021: 3,290 daily

Services
Preceding station	JR East	Following station
Takasaki Terminus	Jōetsu Line	Ino towards Nagaoka
Takasaki Terminus	Agatsuma Line	Ino towards Ōmae
Takasaki towards Tokyo	Takasaki Line Local; Ryōmō Line through-service	Ino towards Maebashi
Takasaki towards Odawara	Shōnan–Shinjuku Line Rapid	Ino towards Maebashi
Takasaki Terminus	Ryōmō Line	Ino towards Oyama
Location
- Location within Gunma Prefecture Location within Japan

Takasaki Tonyamachi Station (高崎問屋町駅, Takasaki ton'yamachi-eki) is a passenger railway station in the city of Takasaki, Gunma, Japan, operated by East Japan Railway Company (JR East).

== Lines ==
Takasakitonyamachi Station is served by the Jōetsu Line, and is 2.8 km from the starting point of the line at Takasaki, with some services operating onto the Agatsuma Line to Ōmae and the Ryōmō Line to Oyama.

== Station layout ==
The station consists of two opposed side platforms serving two tracks. The station building is elevated and is above and to a right angle with the platforms. The west side of the station is named the "Tonya entrance", and the east side is named "Kaizawa entrance". The station has a Midori no Madoguchi ticket office.

=== Platforms ===
1	■ Jōetsu Line	for Shibukawa, Minakami, and Nagaoka
1	■ Agatsuma Line	for Nakanojō and Naganohara-Kusatsuguchi
1	■ Ryōmō Line	for Maebashi, Kiryū and Oyama
2	■ Jōetsu Line	for Takasaki ■ Takasaki Line (Ueno-Tokyo Line, Tokaido Line) for Ōmiya, Tokyo, Yokohama, Atami ■ Shōnan-Shinjuku Line ( Tokaido Line) for Ōmiya, Shinjuku, Yokohama, and Odawara

== History ==
The station opened on 16 October 2004. The name of the station is taken from the large tonyamachi (industrial estate for wholesale retailers) close by.

== Passenger statistics ==
In fiscal 2019, the station was used by an average of 3950 passengers daily (boarding passengers only).

== Surrounding area ==
- Takasaki Wholesale Retailer Industrial Estate
- Gumma Paz College
- Gunma Prefectural Takasaki Girls' High School
- Gunma Prefectural Takasaki Technical High School
- Gunma Prefectural Takasaki Commercial High School

== See also ==
- List of railway stations in Japan
