= Iwajuku Station =

Railway station in Midori, Gunma Prefecture, Japan

Iwajuku Station 岩宿駅
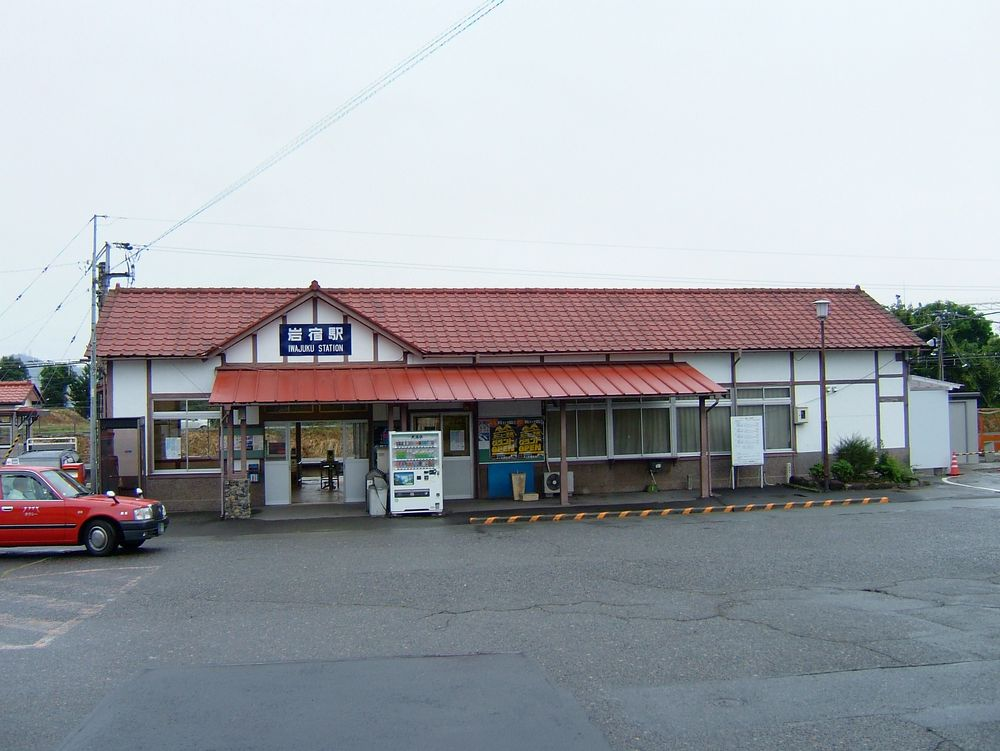
- Iwajuku Station, November 2006

General information
- Location: Kasakake-cho, Asami 1500, Midori-shi, Gunma-ken 379-2311; Japan
- Coordinates: 36.3966°N 139.2972°E
- Operator: JR East
- Line: ■ Ryōmō Line
- Distance: 56.9 km from Oyama
- Platforms: 1 side + 1 island platform

Other information
- Status: Staffed
- Website: Official website

History
- Opened: 20 November 1889; 136 years ago
- Former names: Ōma (until 1911)

Passengers
- FY2021: 1,031 daily

Services
Preceding station	JR East	Following station
Kunisada towards Takasaki	Ryōmō Line	Kiryū towards Oyama
Location
- Location within Gunma Prefecture Location within Japan

Iwajuku Station (岩宿駅, Iwajuku-eki) is a passenger railway station in the city of Midori, Gunma Prefecture, Japan, operated by East Japan Railway Company (JR East).

== Lines ==
Iwajuku Station is a station on the Ryōmō Line, and is located 56.9 rail kilometers from the terminus of the line at Oyama Station, and 34.8 km from Takasaki Station. The preceding station of Kiryū is 4.0 km away and the following station of Kunisada is 6.4 km away.

== Station layout ==
The station has one side platform and one island platform connected by a footbridge. The station is staffed. Iwajuku Station has a Braille fare table, and no other accessibility features.

=== Platforms ===
1	■ Ryōmō Line	for Kiryū, Oyama
2, 3	■ Ryōmō Line	for Isesaki, Maebashi and Takasaki

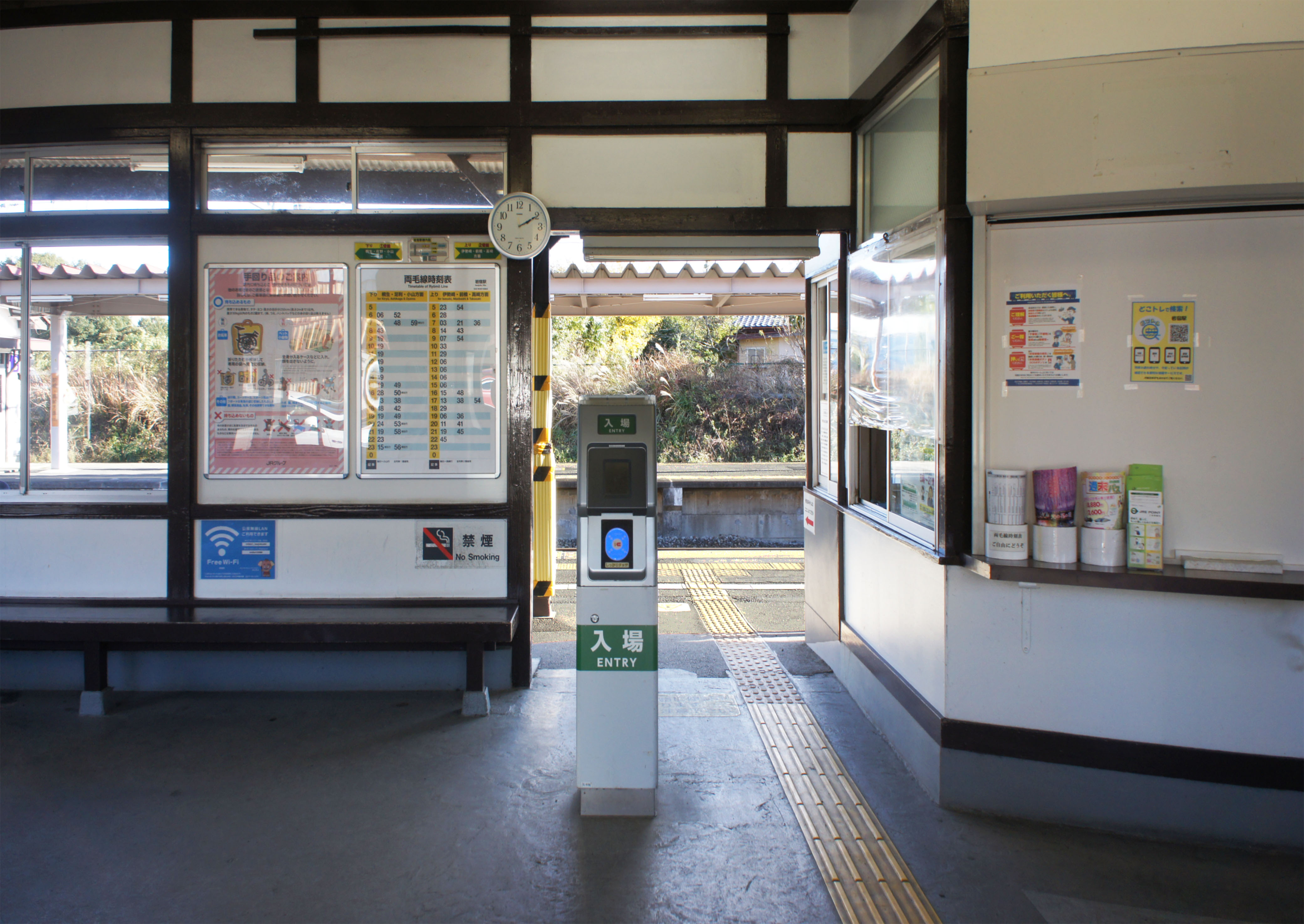
Ticket Gate November 2021

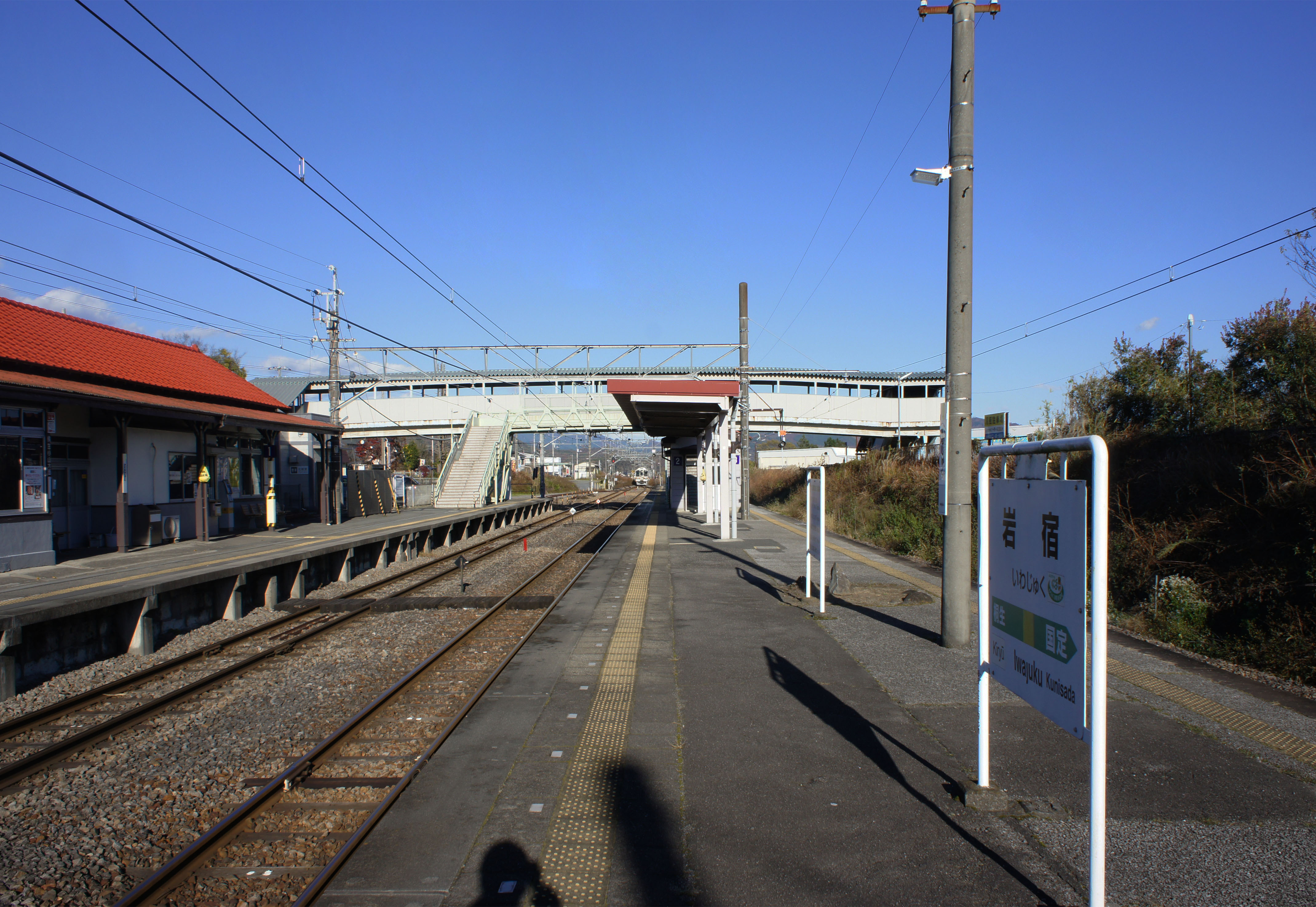
Platforms November 2021

== History ==
Iwajuku Station was opened on 20 November 1889 as Ōma Station (大間々駅, Ōma eki). It was renamed to its present name on 1 May 1911. The current station building was completed in March 1936. The station was absorbed into the JR East network upon the privatization of the Japanese National Railways (JNR) on 1 April 1987. The station started accepting Suica cards on November 18, 2001.

== Passenger statistics ==
In fiscal 2021, the station was used by an average of 1,031 passengers daily (boarding passengers only).

Below is table containing the passenger statistics since the year 2000:

Passenger statistics
Year	Average Daily Boarding Passengers	Year	Average Daily Boarding Passengers	Year	Average Daily Boarding Passengers
2000	1,150	2010	1,090	2020	888
2001	1,080	2011	1,111	2021	1,031
2002	1,023	2012	1,162		
2003	1,025	2013	1,241		
2004	1,042	2014	1,234		
2005	994	2015	1,234		
2006	997	2016	1,253		
2007	1,024	2017	1,243		
2008	1,045	2018	1,251		
2009	1,069	2019	1,255		

== Surrounding area ==
- Iwajuku archaeological site and museum
- Kiryu University
- National Route 50
- Boat Race Kiryu

== See also ==
- List of railway stations in Japan
