= Omoigawa Station =

Railway station in Oyama, Tochigi Prefecture, Japan

Omoigawa Station 思川駅
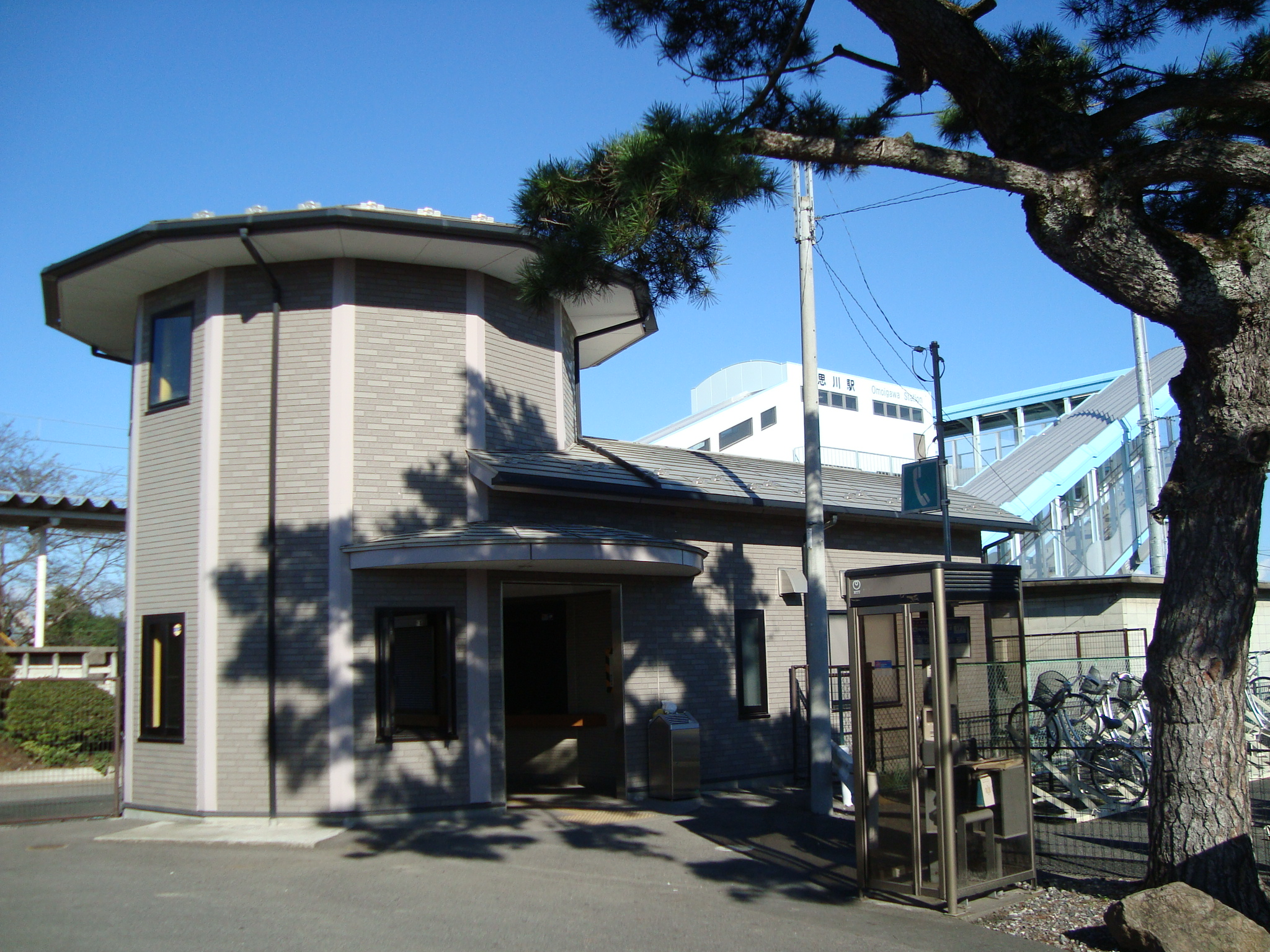
- Omoigawa Station, October 2010

General information
- Location: 965 Matsunuma, Oyama-shi, Tochigi-ken 323-0007; Japan
- Coordinates: 36.3510°N 139.7813°E
- Operator: JR East
- Line: ■ Ryōmō Line
- Distance: 5.4 km from Oyama
- Platforms: 1 island platform
- Tracks: 2

Other information
- Status: Unstaffed
- Website: www.jreast.co.jp/estation/station/info.aspx?StationCd=399

History
- Opened: 10 April 1911

Passengers
- FY2002: 675

Services
Preceding station	JR East	Following station
Tochigi towards Takasaki	Ryōmō Line	Oyama Terminus
Location
- Location within Tochigi Prefecture Location within Japan

Omoigawa Station (思川駅, Omoigawa-eki) is a railway station in the city of Oyama, Tochigi Prefecture, Japan, operated by the East Japan Railway Company (JR East).

== Lines ==
Omoigawa Station is served by the Ryōmō Line, and is located 5.4 km from the terminus of the line at Oyama Station.

== Station layout ==
Omoigawa Station has one island platform connected to the station building by a footbridge. The station is unattended.

=== Platforms ===
1	■ Ryōmō Line	for Kiryū, Maebashi, and Takasaki
2	■ Ryōmō Line	for Oyama

== History ==
Oyama Station was opened on 10 April 1911. The station was absorbed into the JR East network upon the privatization of the Japanese National Railways (JNR) on 1 April 1987. A new station building was completed in March 2000.

== Surrounding area ==
- Oyama City Hall Toyoda branch office
- Shinozuka Inari Jinja
