= Iwafune Station =

Railway station in Tochigi, Tochigi Prefecture, Japan

Iwafune Station 岩舟駅
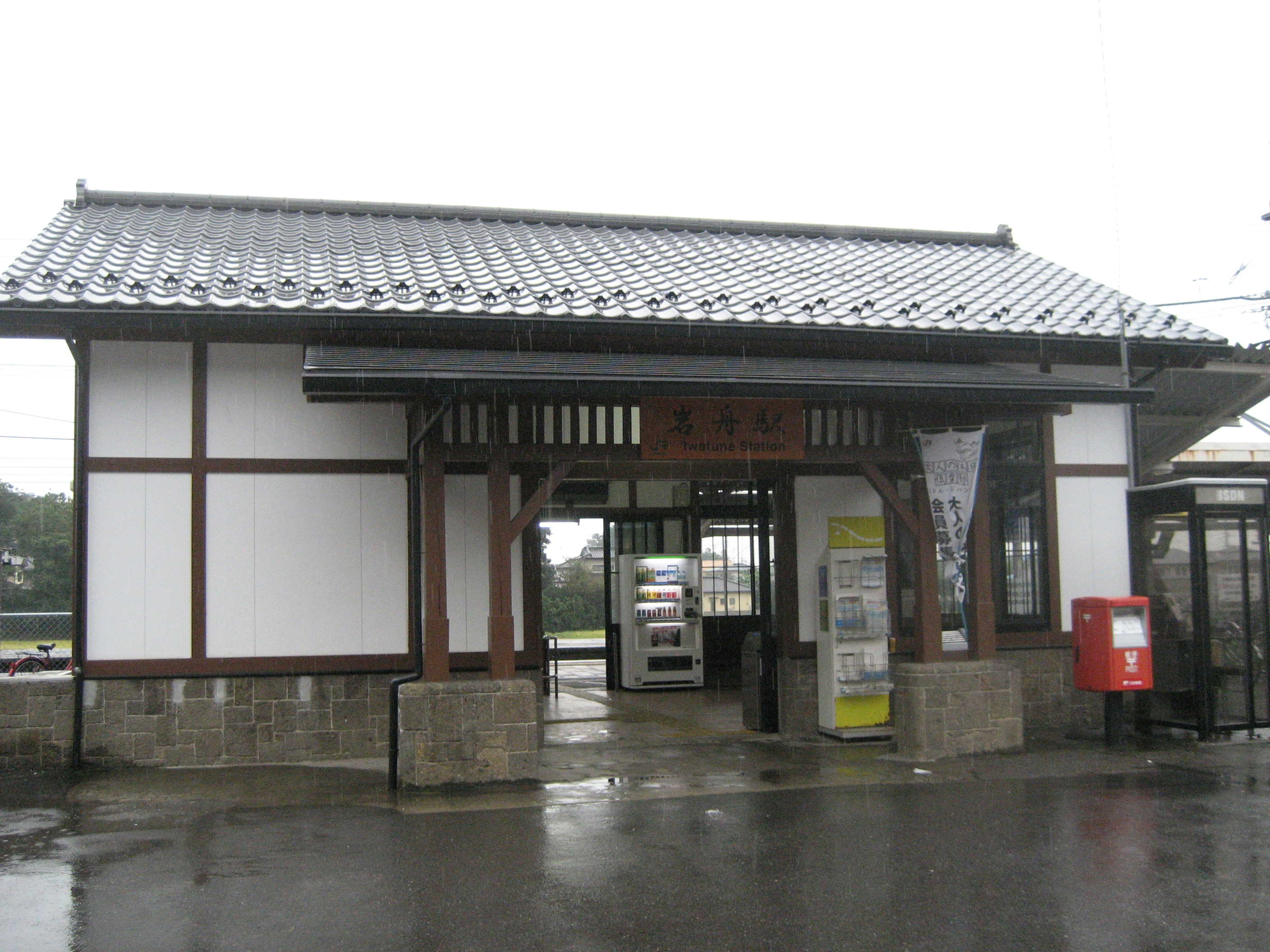
- Iwafune Station, May 2008

General information
- Location: Iwafune-machi Shizu, Tochigi-shi, Tochigi-ken 329-4307; Japan
- Coordinates: 36.326725°N 139.657714°E
- Operator: JR East
- Line: ■ Ryōmō Line
- Distance: 19.3 km from Oyama
- Platforms: 1 side + 1 island platform
- Tracks: 2

Other information
- Status: Unstaffed
- Website: Official website

History
- Opened: 10 October 1889
- Former names: Iwafune (岩船) (until 1902)

Passengers
- FY2011: 568 daily

Services
Preceding station	JR East	Following station
Sano towards Takasaki	Ryōmō Line	Ōhirashita towards Oyama
Location
- Location within Tochigi Prefecture Location within Japan

Iwafune Station (岩舟駅, Iwafune-eki) is a railway station in the city of Tochigi, Tochigi Prefecture, Japan, operated by the East Japan Railway Company (JR East).

== Lines ==
Iwafune Station is served by the Ryōmō Line, and is located 19.3 km from the terminus of the line at Oyama Station.

== Station layout ==
Iwafune Station has a single island platform and a single side platform connected to the station building by a footbridge. The station is unattended.

=== Platforms ===
1	■ Ryōmō Line	for Tochigi for Oyama
2, 3	■ Ryōmō Line	for Sano, and Takasaki

== History ==
Iwafune Station was opened on 10 October 1889 as Iwafune Station (岩船駅, Iwafune-eki). It was renamed to its present kanji spelling on 1 March 1902. The station was absorbed into the JR East network upon the privatization of the Japanese National Railways (JNR) on 1 April 1987.

The current station structure was built in 1936 as a half-timbered building with a characteristic foundation made of regional "Iwafune stone". Originally it had a station master as depicted in the anime film listed below, and a lockable waiting room. As part of a renovation and simultaneous modernization, the part of the station master's accommodation was demolished by JR East in 2006 and the rest of the building was converted into an open waiting hall. The station has been in unstaffed operation since then.

== Passenger statistics ==
In Fiscal 2011, the station was used by an average of 568 passengers daily (boarding passengers only).

== Surrounding area ==
- Iwafune Post Office
- Iwafune Geological Museum

== Film setting ==
In the 2007 animated film 5 Centimeters per Second, Takaki and Akari see each other for the last time at this station on 4 March 1995. Twelve years later, Akari departs from this station for her wedding in Tokyo. In the manga adaption of the film, Takaki also visits this station with his girlfriend in 2007.

== See also ==
- List of railway stations in Japan
