= Ōhirashita Station =

Railway station in Tochigi, Tochigi Prefecture, Japan

Ōhirashita Station 大平下駅
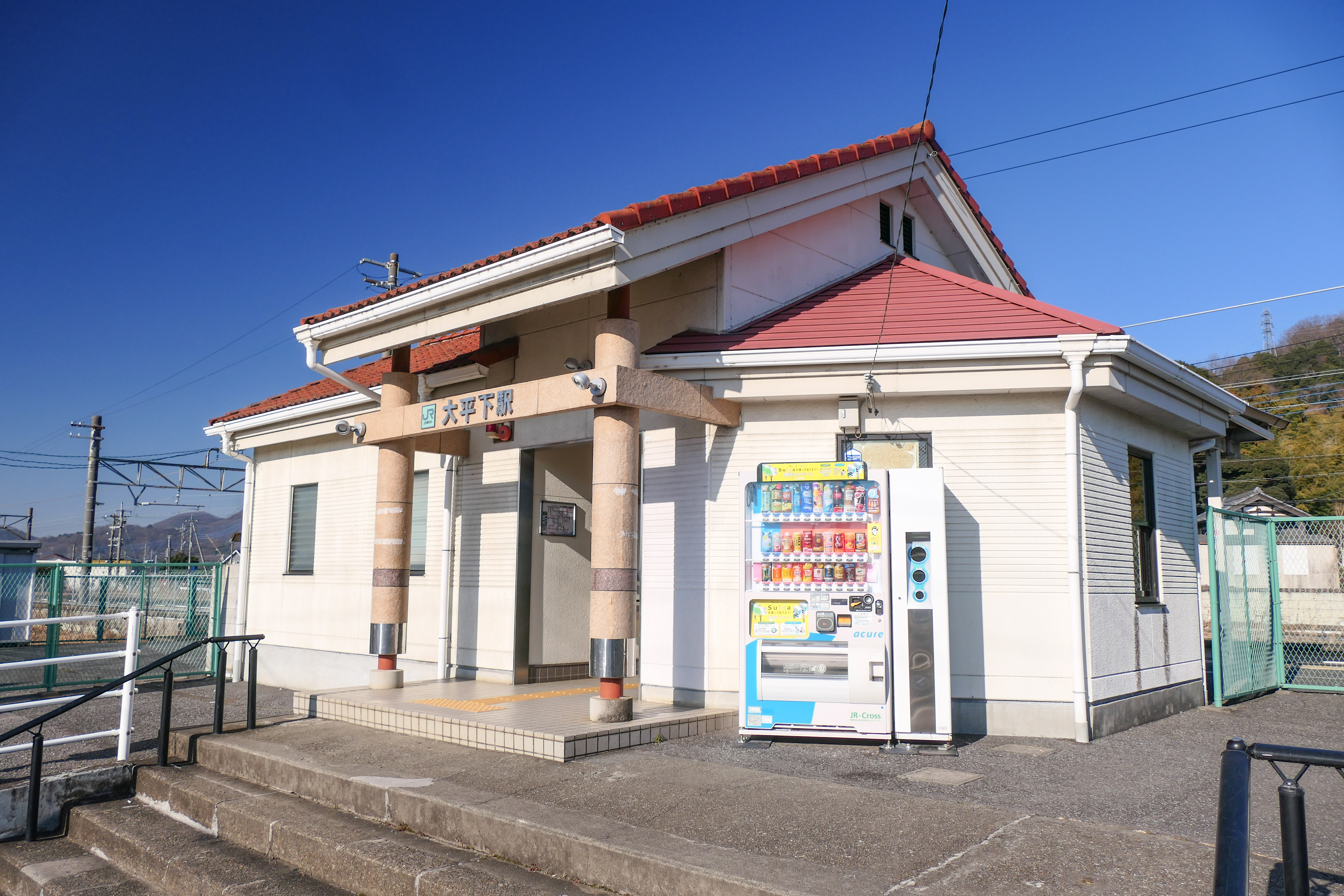
- Ōhirashita Station, January 2023

General information
- Location: Ōhira-machi Tomita, Tochigi-shi, Tochigi-ken 329-4404; Japan
- Coordinates: 36°20′39.62″N 139°41′51.36″E
- Operator: JR East
- Line: ■ Ryōmō Line
- Distance: 15.2 km from Oyama
- Platforms: 1 side platform

Other information
- Status: Unstaffed
- Website: Official website

History
- Opened: 8 March 1895
- Former names: Tomiyama (until 1918)

Passengers
- FY2011: 501

Services
Preceding station	JR East	Following station
Iwafune towards Takasaki	Ryōmō Line	Tochigi towards Oyama
Location
- Location within Tochigi Prefecture Location within Japan

Ōhirashita Station (大平下駅, Ōhirashita-eki) is a railway station in the city of Tochigi, Tochigi Prefecture, Japan, operated by the East Japan Railway Company (JR East).

== Lines ==
Ōhirashita Station is served by the Ryōmō Line, and is located 15.2 km from the terminus of the line at Oyama Station.

== Station layout ==
Ōhirashita Station consists of a single side platform serving traffic in both directions. The station is unattended.

== History ==
Ōhirashita Station was opened on 8 March 1895 as Tomiyama Station (富山駅, Tomiyama-eki). It was renamed to its present name on 16 October 1918. The station was absorbed into the JR East network upon the privatization of the Japanese National Railways (JNR) on 1 April 1987. The layout of the station was reduced from two platforms serving three tracks to the present single platform/single track layout in 2001.

== Passenger statistics ==
In fiscal 2011, the station was used by an average of 501 passengers daily (boarding passengers only).

== Surrounding area ==
- former Ōhira Town Hall
- Ōhira Post Office
- Ōhirashita Hospital

== See also ==
- List of railway stations in Japan
