= Ryōmō Line =

Railway line in Japan

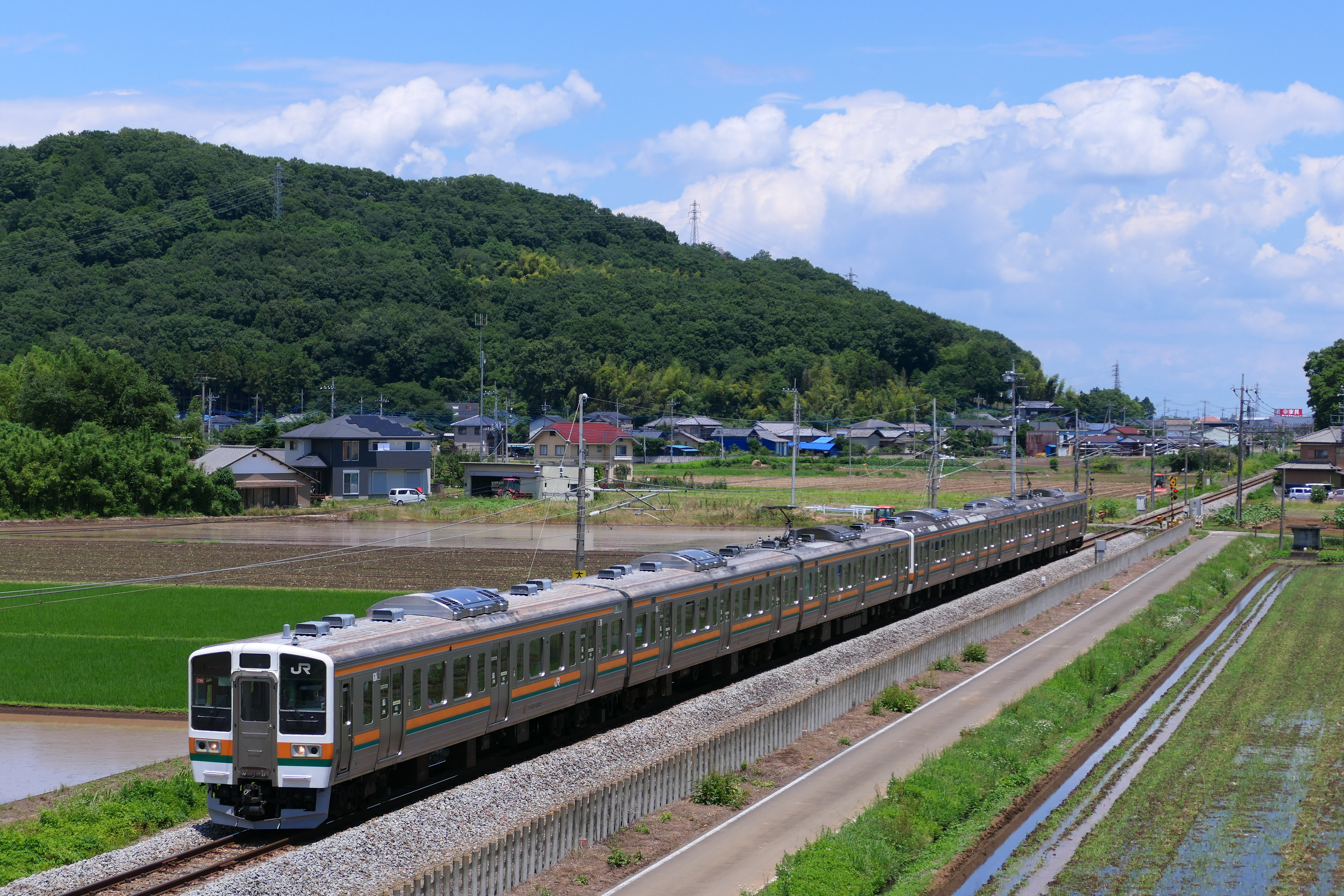
- A JR East 211 series EMU at Ōhirashita in June 2020

Overview
- Locale: Gunma, Tochigi prefectures
- Termini: Oyama; Shin-Maebashi
- Stations: 19

Service
- Operator: JR East

History
- Opened: August 20, 1889; 137 years ago

Technical
- Line length: 84.4 km (52.4 mi)
- Track gauge: 1,067 mm (3 ft 6 in)
- Electrification: 1,500 V DC overhead catenary
- Operating speed: 95 km/h (60 mph)
Route map

The Ryōmō Line (両毛線, Ryōmō-sen) is a Japanese railway line connecting Oyama in Tochigi Prefecture with Maebashi in Gunma Prefecture. 84.4 km (52.4 mi) long, the line is owned and operated by the East Japan Railway Company (JR East). The name refers to the fact that Gunma and Tochigi prefectures were once part of an ancient province called Keno (毛野), which was later split into Kōzuke (Gunma) and Shimotsuke (Tochigi). This line connects both halves of the old province.

== Services ==
Most Ryōmō Line services continue beyond Shin-Maebashi and terminate at Takasaki on the Joetsu Line. Local trains run once an hour during the day between Oyama and Maebashi (more frequently between Maebashi and Takasaki). Some rapid services from Ueno and the Shōnan-Shinjuku Line have through-service to the Ryōmō Line, after which they stop at every station.

Prior to its discontinuation in 2021, Akagi limited express services, branded Swallow Akagi on weekdays, ran between Maebashi and Ueno or Shinjuku.

== Station list ==
Line	Station	Japanese	Distance (km)		Transfers	Location	
Line	Station	Japanese	Between stations	Total	Transfers	Location	
Ryōmō Line	Oyama	小山		0.0	Tohoku Shinkansen; Tohoku Main Line (Utsunomiya Line); Shonan-Shinjuku Line ■ Mito Line	Oyama	Tochigi
Ryōmō Line	Omoigawa	思川	5.4	5.4		Oyama	Tochigi
Ryōmō Line	Tochigi	栃木	5.4	10.8	Tobu Nikko Line; Tobu Utsunomiya Line (Note: The official start of the Tobu Utsunomiya Line is at Shin-Tochigi, but all trains travel through on the Tōbu Nikkō Line to Tochigi.)	Tochigi	Tochigi
Ryōmō Line	Ōhirashita	大平下	4.4	15.2		Tochigi	Tochigi
Ryōmō Line	Iwafune	岩舟	4.1	19.3		Tochigi	Tochigi
Ryōmō Line	Sano	佐野	7.3	26.6	Tōbu Sano Line	Sano	Tochigi
Ryōmō Line	Tomita	富田	4.5	31.1		Ashikaga	Tochigi
Ryōmō Line	Ashikaga Flower Park	あしかがフラワーパーク	0.9	32.0		Ashikaga	Tochigi
Ryōmō Line	Ashikaga	足利	6.2	38.2	Tobu Isesaki Line (Ashikagashi)	Ashikaga	Tochigi
Ryōmō Line	Yamamae	山前	4.5	42.7		Ashikaga	Tochigi
Ryōmō Line	Omata	小俣	4.6	47.3		Ashikaga	Tochigi
Ryōmō Line	Kiryū	桐生	5.6	52.9	■ Watarase Keikoku Line ■ Jōmō Line (Nishi-Kiryū)	Kiryū	Gunma
Ryōmō Line	Iwajuku	岩宿	2.3	56.9		Midori	Gunma
Ryōmō Line	Kunisada	国定	6.4	63.3		Isesaki	Gunma
Ryōmō Line	Isesaki	伊勢崎	5.8	69.1	Tobu Isesaki Line	Isesaki	Gunma
Ryōmō Line	Komagata	駒形	5.8	74.9		Maebashi	Gunma
Ryōmō Line	Maebashi-Ōshima	前橋大島	3.2	78.1		Maebashi	Gunma
Ryōmō Line	Maebashi	前橋	3.8	81.9	■ Jōmō Line (Chūō-Maebashi)	Maebashi	Gunma
Ryōmō Line	Shin-Maebashi	新前橋	2.5	84.4	■ Jōetsu Line (for Minakami) ■ Agatsuma Line (Note: The official start of the Agatsuma Line is at Shibukawa, but all trains travel through on the Joetsu Line to Takasaki.)	Maebashi	Gunma
Joetsu Line	Shin-Maebashi	新前橋	2.5	84.4	■ Jōetsu Line (for Minakami) ■ Agatsuma Line	Maebashi	Gunma
Joetsu Line	Ino	井野	3.3	87.7	■ Jōetsu Line	Takasaki	Gunma
Joetsu Line	Takasakitonyamachi	高崎問屋町	1.2	88.9	■ Jōetsu Line	Takasaki	Gunma
Joetsu Line	Takasaki	高崎	2.8	91.7	Jōetsu Shinkansen; Hokuriku Shinkansen; Takasaki Line; Shonan-Shinjuku Line ■ Shinetsu Main Line ■ Jōetsu Line ■ Hachiko Line (Note: The official start of the Hachiko Line is at Kuragano, but all trains travel through on the Takasaki Line to Takasaki.) ■ Jōshin Dentetsu Jōshin Line	Takasaki	Gunma

== Rolling stock ==
=== Present ===
Takasaki to Oyama

- 211-3000 series 4- and 6-car EMUs (since August 2016)

Takasaki to Maebashi (Takasaki Line through services)

- E231-1000 series
- E233-3000 series (since 1 September 2012)

Ashikaga Ō-Fuji-Matsuri special services

- 185 series (since 2005)
- E257 series (since 2005)
- 485 series (since 2006)

=== Former ===
- 107 series (until October 2017)
- 115-1000 series 4-car EMUs (until March 2018)
- 185 series (Akagi limited express services until March 2016)
- 651 series (Akagi limited express services until 12 March 2021 and Ashikaga Ō-Fuji-Matsuri special services)
- E653 series (Ashikaga Ō-Fuji-Matsuri special services in 2013 and 2014)

== History ==
The Oyama to Kiryu section was opened in 1888 by the Ryomo Railway, and extended to Shin-Maebashi the following year. The company merged with the Nippon Railway in 1897, and that company was nationalised in 1906.
