= Shimo-Shinden Station =

Railway station in Kiryū, Gunma Prefecture, Japan

WK02 Shimo-Shinden Station 下新田駅
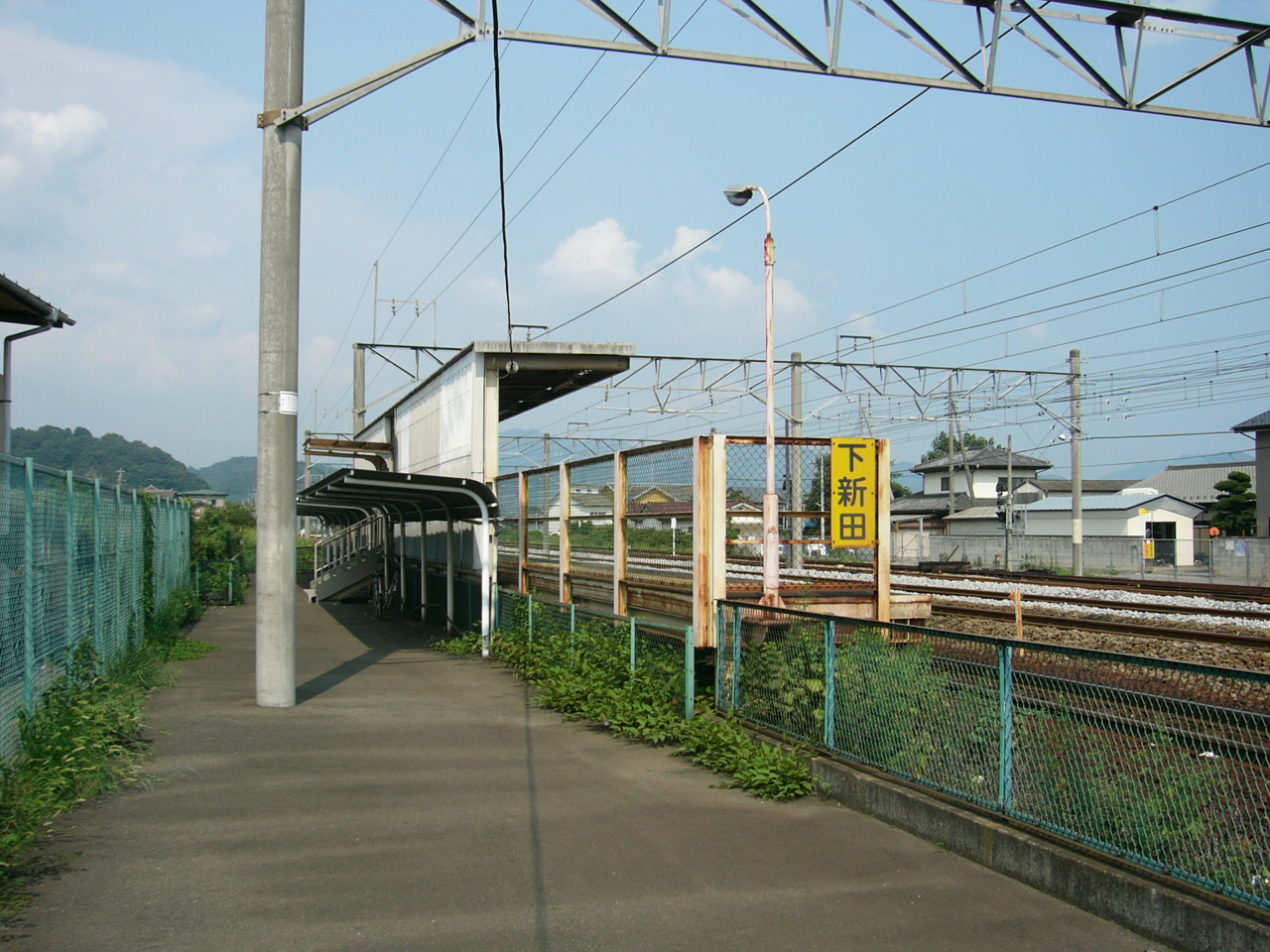
- Shimo-Shinden Station, August 2004

General information
- Location: Aioi-cho 2-18-15, Kiryū-shi, Gunma-ken 376-0011; Japan
- Coordinates: 36.4076°N 139.3151°E
- Operator: Watarase Keikoku Railway
- Line: Watarase Keikoku Line
- Distance: 1.9 km from Kiryū
- Platforms: 1 side platform

Other information
- Status: Unstaffed
- Station code: WK02
- Website: Official website

History
- Opened: 14 March 1992

Passengers
- FY2019: 57

Services
Preceding station	Watarase Keikoku Railway	Following station
Kiryū WK01 Terminus	Watarase Keikoku Line	Aioi WK03 towards Matō
Location
- Location within Gunma Prefecture Location within Japan

Shimo-Shinden Station (下新田駅, Shimo-Shinden-eki) is a passenger railway station in the city of Kiryū, Gunma, Japan, operated by the third sector railway company Watarase Keikoku Railway. The Ryōmō Line of JR passes through without stopping.

== Lines ==
Shimo-Shinden Station is a station on the Watarase Keikoku Line and is 1.9 kilometers from the terminus of the line at Kiryū.

== Station layout ==
The station consists of a single side platform serving traffic in both direction. There is no station building. The station is unattended.

== History ==
Shimo-Shinden Station opened on 14 March 1992.

== Passenger statistics ==
In fiscal 2019, the station was used by an average of 57 passengers daily (boarding passengers only).

== Surrounding area ==
- Kiryū Aioi Post Office
- National Route 122

== See also ==
- List of railway stations in Japan
