= Kiryū Station =

Railway station in Kiryū, Gunma Prefecture, Japan

WK01 Kiryū Station 桐生駅
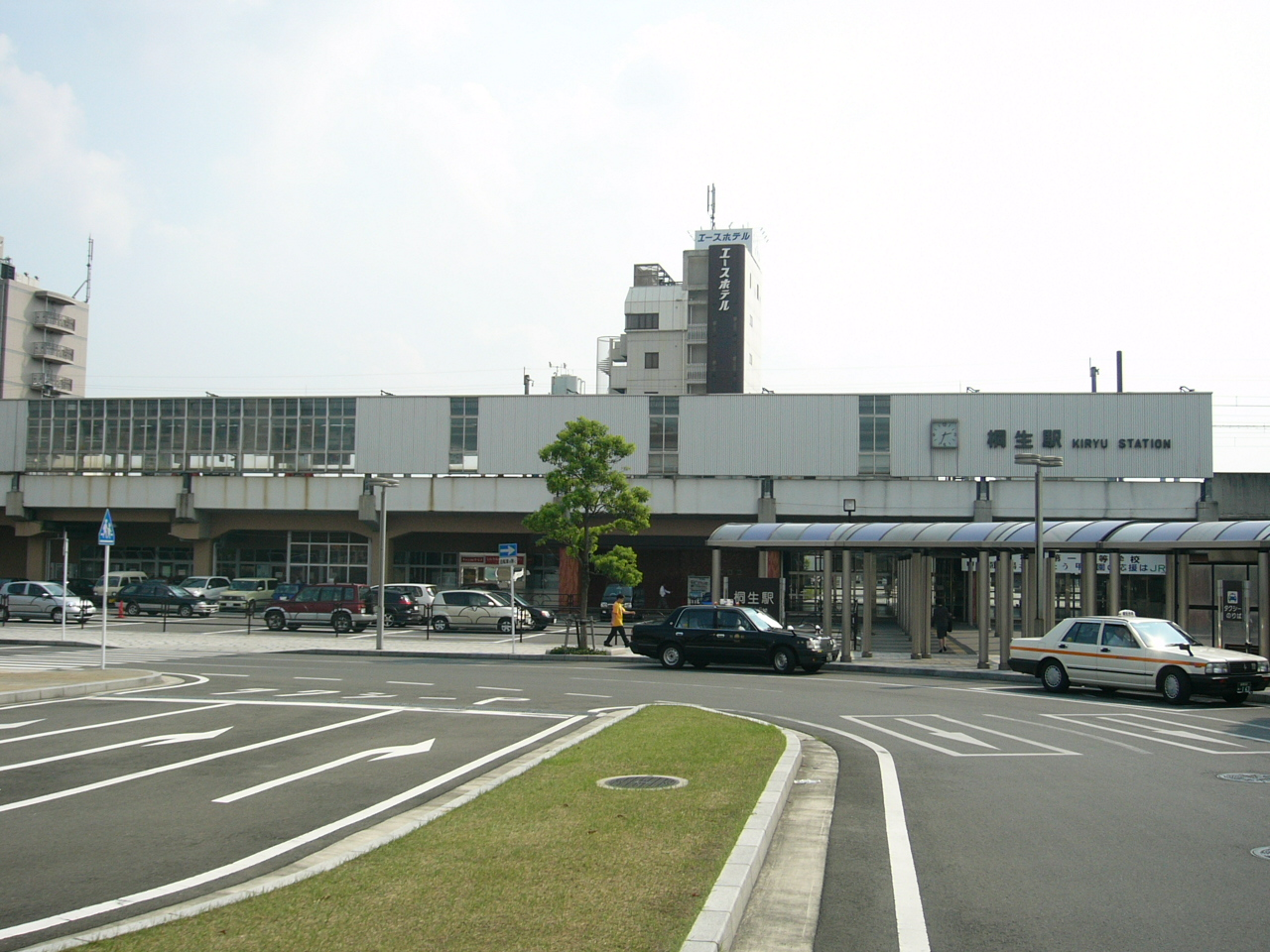
- Kiryū Station North entrance, August 2004

General information
- Location: Hirose-cho, Kiryū-shi, Gunma-ken 376-0045; Japan
- Coordinates: 36.4111°N 139.3334°E
- Operator: JR East; Watarase Keikoku Railway
- Lines: Ryōmō Line; Watarase Keikoku Line
- Distance: 52.4 km (32.6 mi) from Oyama
- Platforms: 2 island platforms
- Tracks: 4

Construction
- Structure type: Elevated

Other information
- Status: Staffed (Midori no Madoguchi )
- Station code: WK01
- Website: Official website

History
- Opened: 15 November 1888; 137 years ago

Passengers
- FY2021: 3,193

Services
| Preceding station | JR East | Following station |
|---|---|---|
| Iwajuku towards Takasaki | Ryōmō Line | Omata towards Oyama |
| Preceding station | Watarase Keikoku Railway | Following station |
| Shimo-Shinden WK02 towards Matō | Watarase Keikoku Line | Terminus |
Location
- Location within Gunma Prefecture Location within Japan

Kiryū Station (桐生駅, Kiryū-eki) is a junction railway station in the city of Kiryū, Gunma, Japan, jointly operated by the East Japan Railway Company (JR East) and the third-sector railway operating company Watarase Keikoku Railway. Kiryu Station is the easternmost JR station in Gunma Prefecture.

== Lines ==
Kiryū Station is served by the Ryōmō Line, and is located 52.9 km (32.9 mi) from the starting point of the line at Oyama Station, and 38.8 km (24.1 mi) from Takasaki Station. The preceding station of Omata is 5.6 km (3.5 mi) away and the following station of Iwajuku is 2.3 km (1.4 mi) away. It is also the terminal station for the Watarase Keikoku Railway Watarase Keikoku Line, and is 44.1 km (27.4 mi) from the opposing terminus of the line at Matō. The following station of Shimo-Shinden Station is 1.9 km (1.2 mi) away.

== Station layout ==
The station consists of two elevated island platforms serving four tracks, one track for the Watarese Keikoku Line and three tracks for the Ryōmō Line, with the station building underneath. The station has a Midori no Madoguchi ticket office and has coin lockers. The station has many accessibility features such as escalators, elevators, Mobility scooter access, wheelchair-accessible bathroom, and a Braille Fare table.

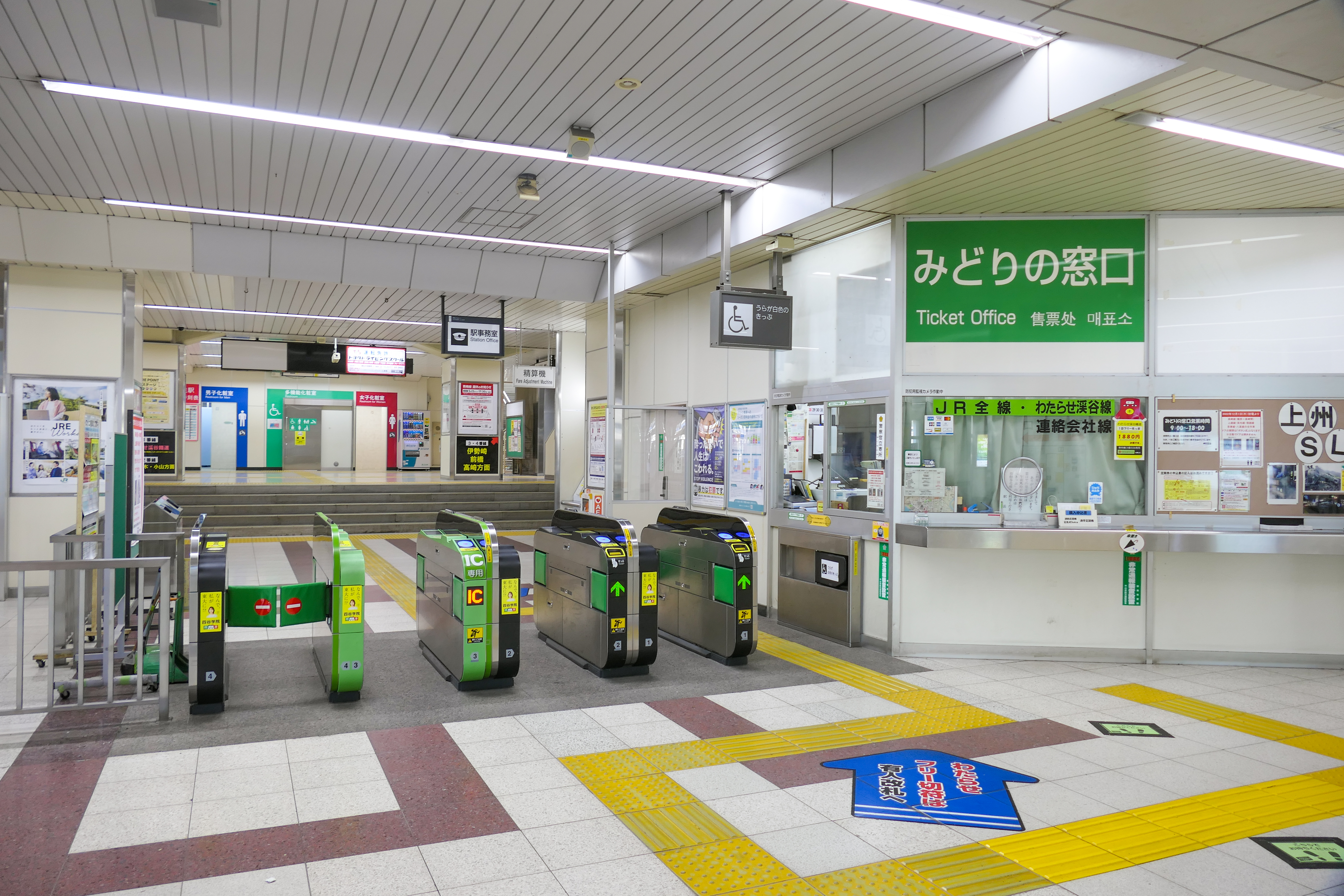
JR East ticket Office April 2023

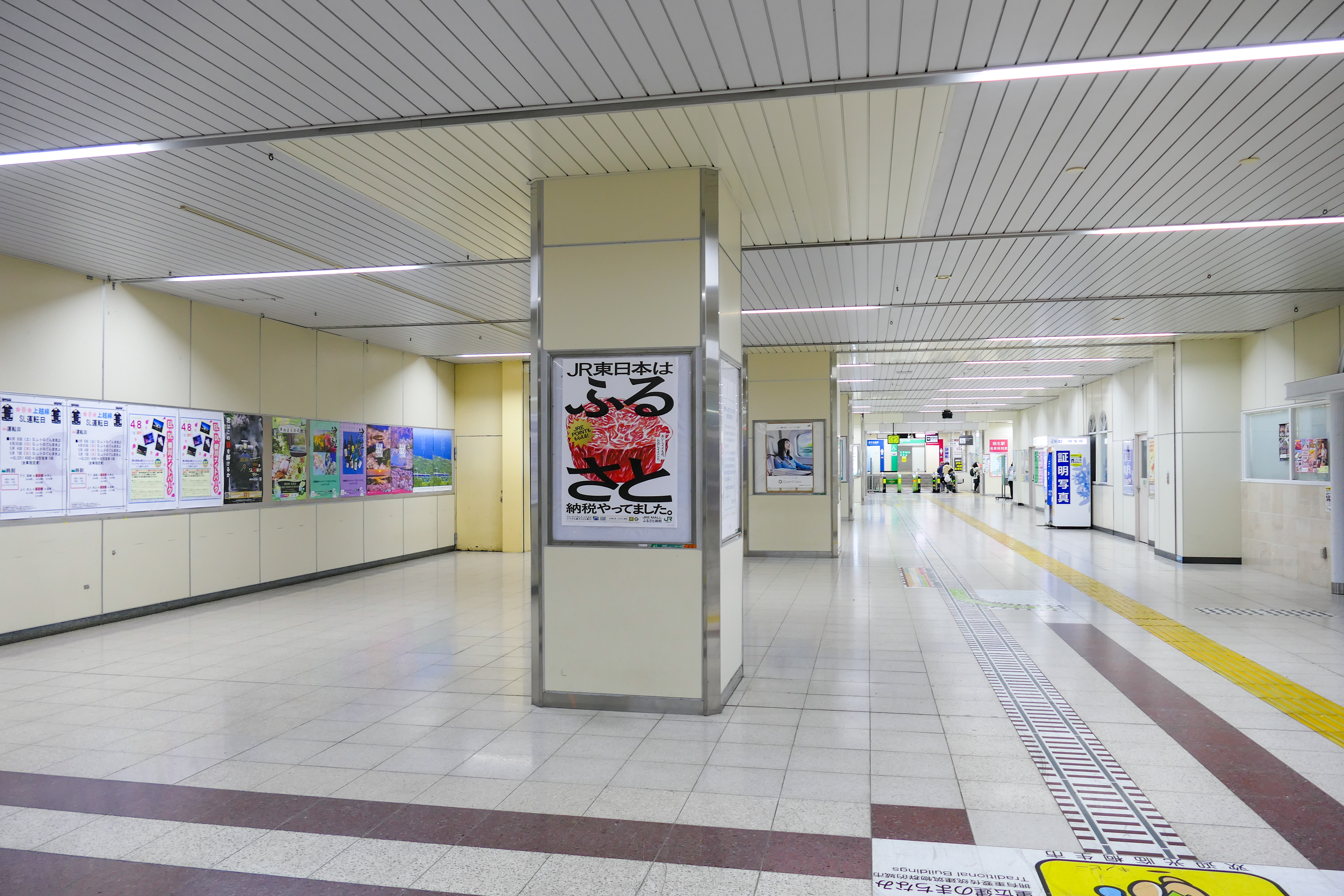
Concourse April 2023

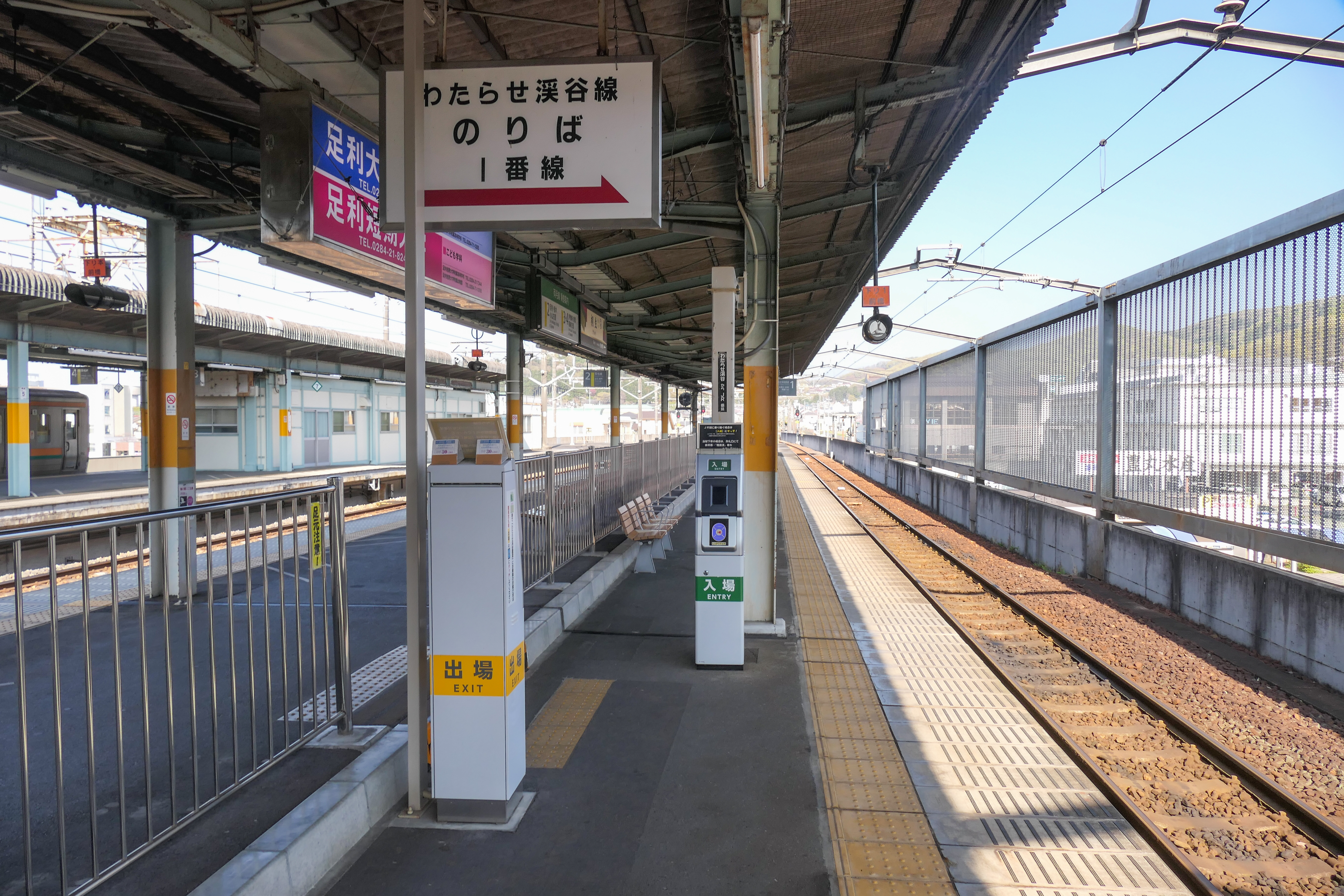
Watarase line Platform April 2023

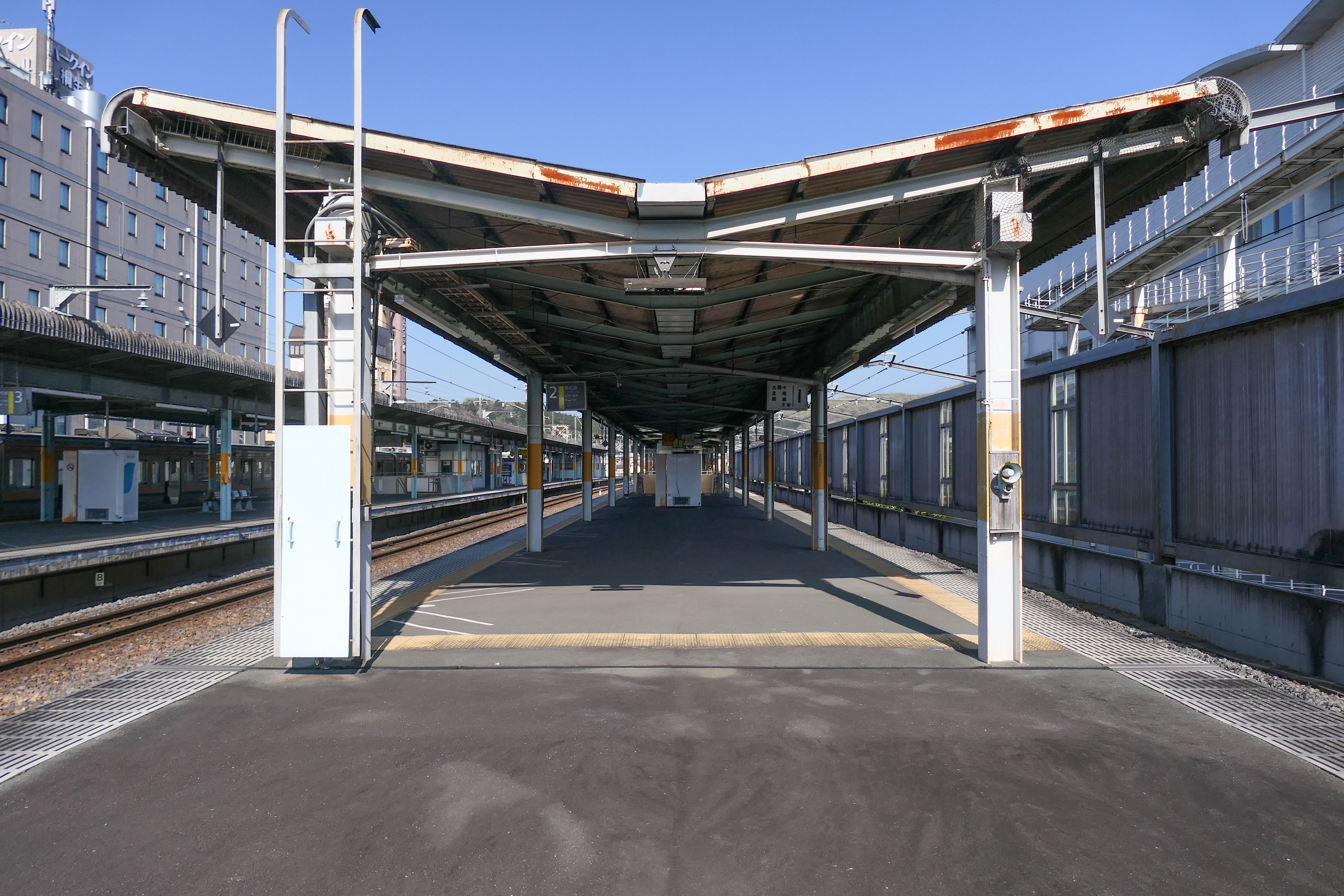
Platforms 1 & 2 April 2023

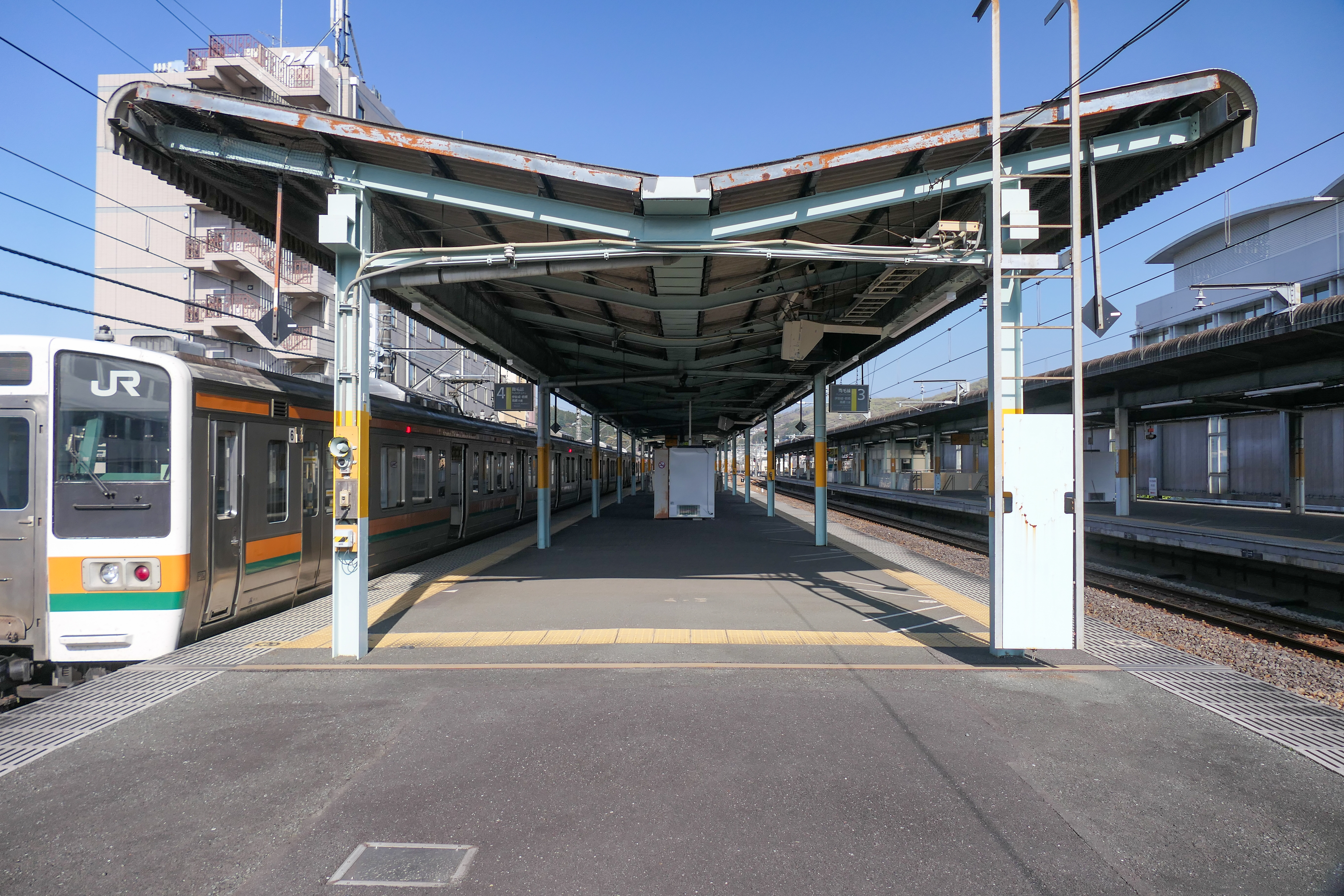
Platforms 3 & 4 April 2023

=== Platforms ===
| 1 | ■ Watarase Keikoku Line | for Ōmama, Ashio, and Matō |
| 2 | ■ Ryōmō Line | for Ashikaga, Tochigi, and Oyama |
| 3; 4 | ■ Ryōmō Line | for Isesaki, Maebashi, and Takasaki |

== History ==
Kiryū Station opened on 15 November 1888 as a station along the Ryōmō Line. On 15 April 1911, Ashio Railway (now Watarase Keikoku Railway) opened. The station building was rebuilt in 1928 and once again rebuilt from 1983 to 1985 as an elevated station. Upon the privatization of the Japanese National Railways (JNR) on 1 April 1987, it came under the control of JR East.

The station started accepting Suica cards on 18 November 2001.

== Passenger statistics ==
In fiscal 2021, the station was used by an average of 3,193 passengers daily (boarding JR East passengers only).

Below is table containing the passenger statistics since the year 2000:

Passenger statistics
| Year | Average Daily Boarding Passengers (JR East) | Average Daily Boarding Passengers (Watarase) | Year | Average Daily Boarding Passengers (JR East) | Average Daily Boarding Passengers (Watarase) | Year | Average Daily Boarding Passengers (JR East) | Average Daily Boarding Passengers (Watarase) |
|---|---|---|---|---|---|---|---|---|
| 2000 | 4,587 | | 2010 | 3,681 | 608 | 2020 | 2,848 | |
| 2001 | 4,334 | | 2011 | 3,717 | 564 | 2021 | 3,193 | |
| 2002 | 4,216 | | 2012 | 3,845 | 578 | | | |
| 2003 | 4,124 | | 2013 | 3,920 | 558 | | | |
| 2004 | 3,968 | | 2014 | 3,867 | 574 | | | |
| 2005 | 3,841 | | 2015 | 3,959 | 630 | | | |
| 2006 | 3,714 | | 2016 | 3,955 | 616 | | | |
| 2007 | 3,651 | | 2017 | 3,954 | 589 | | | |
| 2008 | 3,739 | | 2018 | 3,880 | 574 | | | |
| 2009 | 3,690 | 698 | 2019 | 3,749 | 560 | | | |

== Surrounding area ==
- Kiryū City Hall
- MEGA Don Quijote Kiryū
- Nishi-Kiryū Station
- Okawa Museum of Art
- Gunma University Faculty of Science and Technology
- Toyoko Inn Kiryū Station South Exit
- Watarase River
- Shinkawa Park
- Kiryū High School
- Kiryū Post Office
- Kiryū City Library
- Kiryū Public Hall
- Kiryū pension office
- Kiryū Public Employment Security Office
- Kiryū Chamber of Commerce and Industry
- National Route 122

== See also ==
- List of railway stations in Japan
