= Oyama Station =

Railway station in Oyama, Tochigi Prefecture, Japan

Coordinates: 36.312808°N 139.80639°E

Oyama Station 小山駅
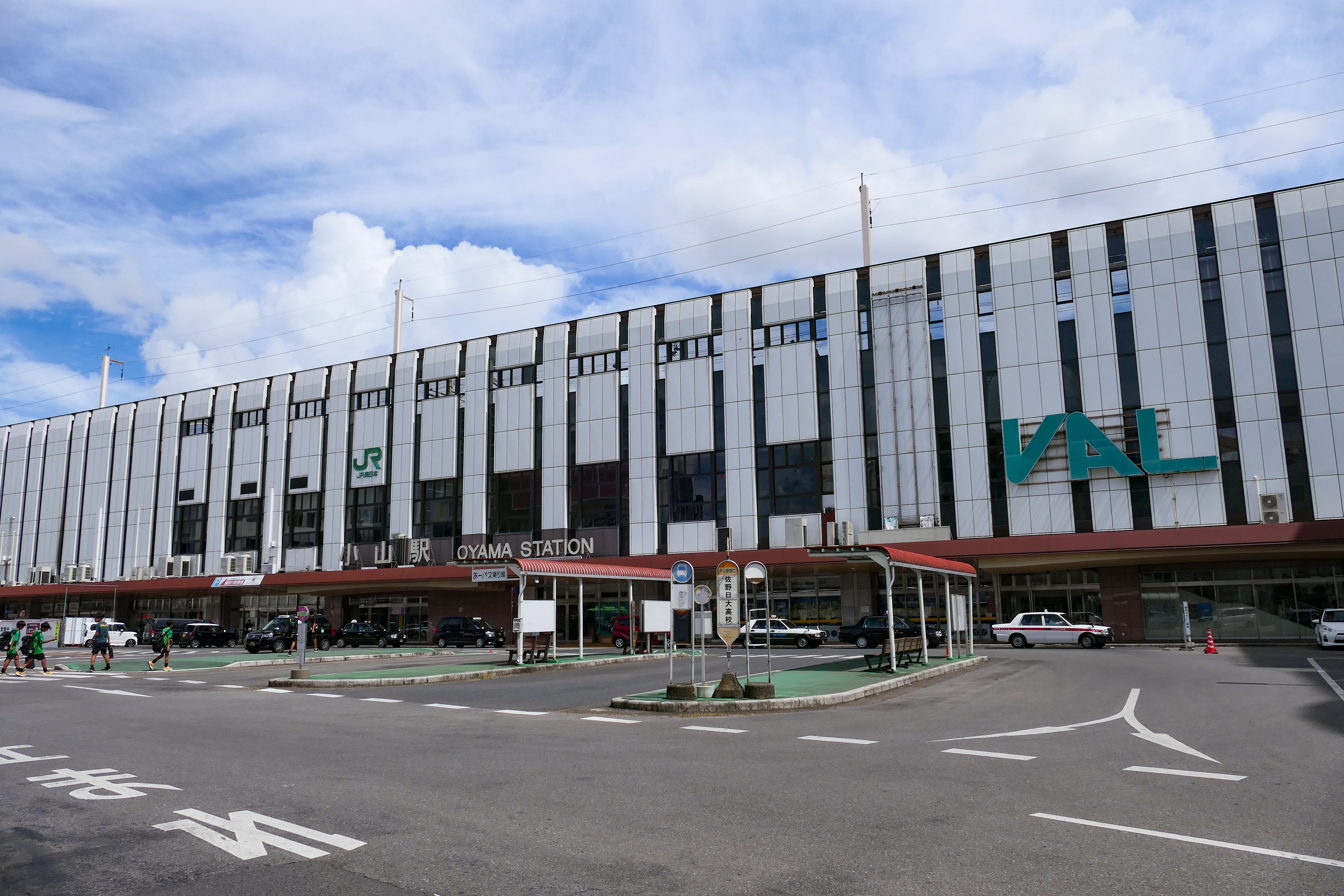
- Exterior of Oyama Station in 2024

General information
- Location: 3-3-22 Shiroyamacho, Oyama-shi, Tochigi-ken 323-0025; Japan
- Operator: JR East; JR Freight
- Lines: Tōhoku Shinkansen; Tōhoku Main Line; ■■ Shonan-Shinjuku Line; Mito Line; Ryōmō Line
- Distance: 80.6 km (50.1 mi) from Tokyo
- Platforms: 1 side, 2 bay, 4 island platforms
- Tracks: 11 (3 Shinkansen)

Other information
- Status: Staffed ( Midori no Madoguchi )
- Station code: Elevated (Shinkansen); At grade (conventional)
- Website: Official website

History
- Opened: 16 July 1885; 141 years ago

Passengers
- FY2019: 22,471(daily)
Services
Preceding station	JR East	Following station
Ōmiya towards Tokyo	Tōhoku Shinkansen Yamabiko	Utsunomiya towards Morioka
Ōmiya towards Tokyo	Tōhoku Shinkansen Nasuno	Utsunomiya towards Kōriyama
Omoigawa towards Takasaki	Ryōmō Line	Terminus
Koga One-way operation	Utsunomiya Line Rapid Rabbit	Koganei towards Utsunomiya
Mamada towards Tokyo	Utsunomiya Line Local	Koganei towards Kuroiso
Koga towards Zushi	Shōnan–Shinjuku Line Rapid	Koganei towards Utsunomiya
Mamada towards Zushi	Shōnan–Shinjuku Line Local	Koganei towards Utsunomiya
Terminus	Mito Line	Otabayashi towards Mito
Location
- Location within Tochigi Prefecture Location within Japan

Oyama Station (小山駅, Oyama-eki) is a junction railway station in the city of Oyama, Tochigi, Japan, operated by the East Japan Railway Company (JR East). The station is also a freight depot for the Japan Freight Railway Company (JR Freight).

== Overview ==
This station is the representative station of Oyama City, the second largest city in Tochigi Prefecture, and the largest terminal station next to Utsunomiya Station in the prefecture.

== Lines ==
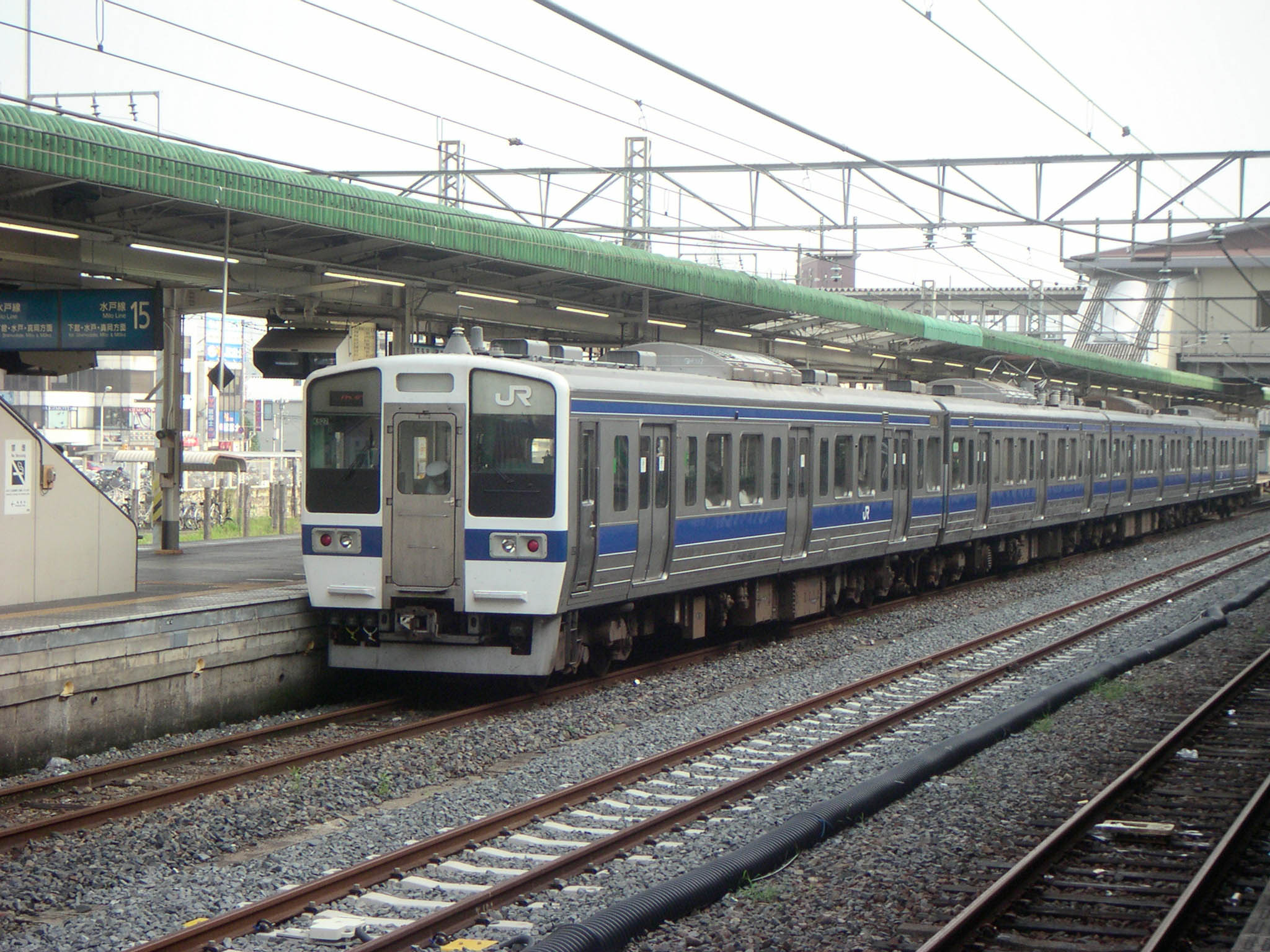
A Mito Line 415 series train at Oyama

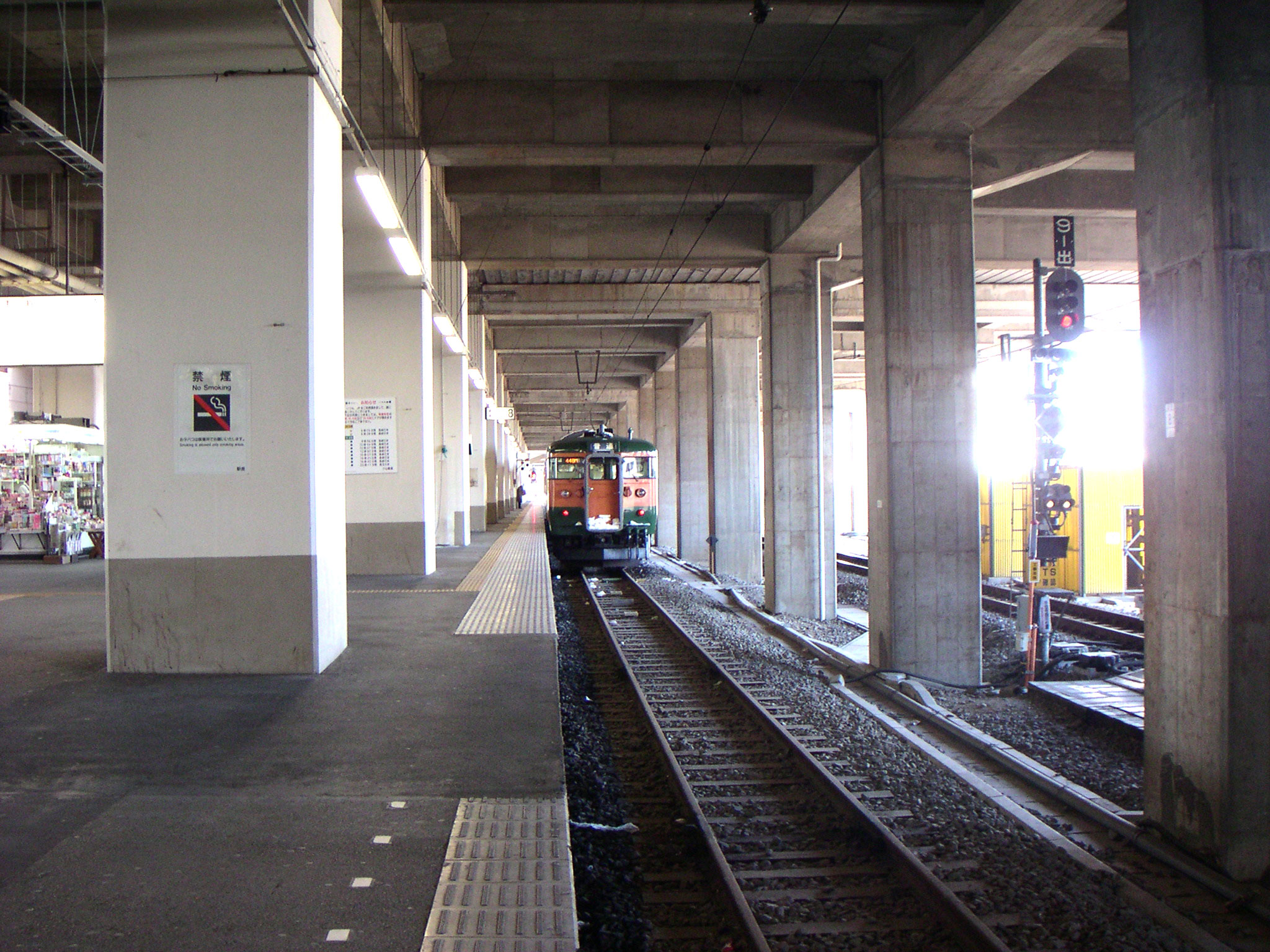
A Ryōmō Line 115 series train at Oyama

Oyama Station is served by the following lines.

- Tōhoku Shinkansen
- Utsunomiya Line (Tōhoku Main Line)
- Shōnan-Shinjuku Line
- Mito Line
- Ryōmō Line

== Station layout ==
The Shinkansen portion of the station has one side platform and one island platform, both of which are elevated. The local portion of the station has two bay platforms (Platforms 6 and 8) for the Ryomo Line and three island platforms (Platforms 9 and 10, 12 and 13, 15 and 16) of the other local lines. There are no platforms 2, 3, 7, 11, 14.

=== Platforms ===
1	■ Tōhoku Shinkansen	for Nasushiobara, Fukushima, Sendai, and Morioka
4,5	■ Tōhoku Shinkansen	for Ōmiya, Ueno, and Tokyo
6,8	■ Ryōmō Line	for Tochigi, Sano, Ashikaga, Kiryū, Maebashi, and Takasaki
9,10	■ Utsunomiya Line	for Utsunomiya, Nasushiobara, and Kuroiso
9,10	■ Shonan-Shinjuku Line	for Utsunomiya
12,13	■ Utsunomiya Line (Ueno-Tokyo Line)	for Ōmiya, Ueno, Tokyo, Yokohama, Atami, Numazu and Ito (via Tokaido Line and Ito Line)
12,13	■ Shōnan–Shinjuku Line	for Ōmiya, Shinjuku, Yokohama, Ōfuna and Zushi (via Yokosuka Line)
15,16	■ Mito Line	for Shimodate, Tomobe, and Mito

- Most up Shinkansen services use platform 4.
- Some trains on the Ryōmō Line offering through service to Utsunomiya operate from Platform 9.

== History ==
- July 16, 1885: The station opens on what later becomes the Tōhoku Main Line.
- May 22, 1888: The Ryōmō Line opens.
- January 16, 1889: The Mito Line opens.
- June 23, 1982: The Tōhoku Shinkansen opens.

== Passenger statistics ==
In fiscal 2019, the station was used by an average of 22,471 passengers daily (boarding passengers only).

== See also ==
- List of railway stations in Japan
