= List of junior colleges in Japan =

This is the comprehensive list of junior colleges in Japan that exist today or existed in the past. For the purpose of the list, a junior college is defined to be a two-year or three-year college. The list does not include so-called Daigaku-bu, or junior colleges that are part of four-year colleges.

== Current ==
- ♀Aichi Bunkyo Women's College, Inazawa, Aichi
- Aichi Kiwami College of Nursing, Ichinomiya, Aichi
- Aichi Konan College, Konan, Aichi
- Aikoku Gakuen Junior College, Edogawa, Tokyo
- Aino University, Ibaraki, Osaka
- Akikusa Gakuen Junior College, Tokorozawa, Saitama
- Akita Municipal Junior College of Arts and Crafts, Akita, Akita
- Aomori Akenohoshi Junior College, Aomori, Aomori
- Aomori Chuo Junior College, Aomori, Aomori
- ♀Aoyama Gakuin Women's Junior College, Shibuya, Tokyo
- Ashikaga Junior College, Ashikaga, Tochigi
- Ashiya College, Ashiya, Hyogo
- Beppu Mizobe Gakuen College, Beppu, Oita
- Bunkyo Gakuin College, Bunkyo, Tokyo
- ♀Caritas Junior College, Yokohama, Kanagawa
- Chiba College of Health Science, Chiba, Chiba
- Chiba Keiai Junior College, Sakura, Chiba
- Chiba Meitoku College, Chiba, Chiba
- Chukyo Junior College, Mizunami, Gifu
- College of Industrial Technology, Amagasaki, Hyogo
- Daiichi Junior College for Kindergarten Teachers, Dazaifu, Fukuoka
- Daiichi Junior College of Infant Education, Kirishima, Kagoshima
- ♀Ehime Women's College, Uwajima, Ehime
- Fujita Health University College, Toyoake, Aichi
- Fukuoka College of Health Sciences, Fukuoka, Fukuoka
- ♀Fukuoka Women's Junior College, Dazaifu, Fukuoka
- ♀Fukuyama City Junior College for Women, Fukuyama, Hiroshima
- ♀Gifu City Women's College, Gifu, Gifu
- Gifu Junior College Of Health Science, Gifu, Gifu
- Gunma Shorei Junior College of Welfare, Ota, Gunma
- Hachinohe Junior College, Hachinohe, Aomori
- Hakodate Otani College, Hakodate, Hokkaido
- ♀Hakuho Women's College, Ōji, Nara
- Higashi Chikushi Junior College, Kitakyushu, Fukuoka
- Higashikyushu Junior College, Nakatsu, Oita
- Hirosaki Welfare Junior College, Hirosaki, Aomori
- Hiroshima Bunka Two-Year College, Hiroshima, Hiroshima
- ♀Hokkaido Musashi Women's Junior College
- Honan College, Tatsuno, Nagano
- Hosen Gakuen College, Nakano, Tokyo
- ♀Ibaraki Women's Junior college, Naka, Ibaraki
- ♀Ichinomiya Women's Junior College, Ichinomiya, Aichi
- ♀Iida Women's Junior College, Iida, Nagano
- Ikenobo College, Kyoto, Kyoto
- ♀IKUEI Junior College, Takasaki, Gunma
- Imabari Meitoku Junior College, Imabari
- Iwaki Junior College, Iwaki, Fukushima
- Iwakuni Junior College, Iwakuni, Yamaguchi
- Iwate College of Nursing, Takizawa, Iwate
- Izumi Junior College, Sagamihara, Kanagawa
- Japan Christian Junior College, Chiba, Chiba
- ♀Jin-ai Women's College, Fukui, Fukui
- ♀Jissen Women's Junior College, Hino, Tokyo
- Josai University, Sakado, Saitama
- Junshin Junior College, Fukuoka, Fukuoka
- Kacho College, Kyoto, Kyoto
- Kagawa Junior College, Utazu, Kagawa
- ♀Kagoshima Women's Junior College, Kagoshima, Kagoshima
- Kagoshima Prefectural College, Kagoshima, Kagoshima
- Kanagawa Prefectural College of Foreign Studies, Yokohama, Kanagawa
- Kanazawa Gakuin College, Kanazawa, Ishikawa
- ♀Kansai Women's College, Kashiwara, Osaka
- Kanto Junior College, Tatebayashi, Gunma
- Kawaguchi Junior College, Kawaguchi, Saitama
- Kawasaki City College of Nursing, Kawasaki, Kanagawa
- Kawasaki College of Allied Health Professions, Kurashiki, Okayama
- Kibi International University Junior College, Takahashi, Okayama
- ♀Kobe Women's Junior College, Kobe, Hyogo
- Kobe Yamate College, Kobe, Hyogo
- Kochi Gakuen College, Kōchi, Kōchi
- ♀Koen Gakuen Women's Junior College, Sapporo, Hokkaido
- Kokugakuin Junior College, Takikawa, Hokkaido
- Kokugakuin Tochigi Junior College, Tochigi, Tochigi
- Kokusai Gakuin Saitama Junior College, Saitama, Saitama
- Kokusai Junior College, Nakano, Tokyo
- Komatsu College, Komatsu, Ishikawa
- ♀Komazawa Women's Junior College, Inagi, Tokyo
- ♀Koran Women's Junior College, Fukuoka, Fukuoka
- Koshien Junior College, Nishinomiya, Hyogo
- Kurashiki City College, Kurashiki, Okayama
- ♀Kurume SHIN-AI Women's College, Kurume, Fukuoka
- Kushiro Junior College, Kushiro, Hokkaido
- Kyoei Gakuen Junior College, Kasukabe, Saitama
- ♀Kyoritsu Women's Junior College, Chiyoda, Tokyo
- Kyoto Bunkyo Junior College, Uji, Kyoto
- Kyoto College of Economics, Kyoto, Kyoto
- Kyoto College of Medical Technology, Sonobe, Kyoto
- Kyoto Junior College, Fukuchiyama, Kyoto
- Kyoto Municipal Junior College of Nursing, Kyoto, Kyoto
- Kyoto Seizan College, Nagaokakyo, Kyoto
- Kyushu Ryukoku Junior College, Tosu, Saga
- ♀Kyushu Women's Junior College, Kitakyushu, Fukuoka
- Kyushu Zokei Art College, Fukuoka, Fukuoka
- Kyushu Otani Junior College, Chikugo, Fukuoka
- Matsumoto Junior College, Matsumoto, Nagano
- Matsuyama Shinonome Junior College, Matsuyama, Ehime
- Meirin College, Niigata, Niigata
- Meiwa Gakuen Junior College, Maebashi, Gunma
- Minami Kyushu Junior College, Miyazaki, Miyazaki
- Minatogawa College, Sanda, Hyogo
- Misono Gakuen Junior College, Akita, Akita
- Mito Junior College, Mito, Ibaraki
- Miyagi Seishin Junior College, Furukawa, Miyagi
- Miyazaki Gakuen Junior College, Kiyotake, Miyazaki
- Musashigaoka College, Yoshimi, Saitama
- ♀Musashino Junior College, Sayama, Saitama
- NAGASAKI GYOKUSEI Junior College, Nagasaki, Nagasaki
- ♀Narabunka Women's College, Yamatotakada, Nara
- Nagano College of Economics, Nagano, Nagano
- ♀Nagano Women's Junior College, Nagano, Nagano
- Nagasaki College of Foreign Languages, Nagasaki, Nagasaki
- Nagasaki Junior College, Sasebo, Nagasaki
- ♀Nagasaki Women's Junior College, Nagasaki, Nagasaki
- Nagoya College, Toyoake, Aichi
- Nagoya Management Junior College, Owariasahi, Aichi
- Nagoya Ryūjō Junior College, Nagoya, Aichi
- Nakakyushu Junior College, Yatsushiro, Kumamoto
- Nakanihon Automotive College, Sakahogi, Gifu
- Nanzan Junior College, Nagoya, Aichi
- Nara College of Art, Kashihara, Nara
- Nara Saho College, Nara, Nara
- Nayoro City College, Nayoro, Hokkaido
- Newton College
- Niigata Chuoh Junior College, Kamo, Niigata
- Niigata College of Technology, Niigata, Niigata
- ♀Niigata Woman's College, Niigata, Niigata
- Niijima Gakuen Junior College, Takasaki, Gunma
- Niimi College, Niimi, Okayama
- Nishi-nippon Junior College, Fukuoka, Fukuoka
- Obihiro Otani Junior College, Otofuke, Hokkaido
- ♀Odawara Women's Junior College, Odawara, Kanagawa
- ♀Ogaki Women's College, Ogaki, Gifu
- Oita Junior College, Oita, Oita
- Oita Prefectural College of Arts and Culture, Oita, Oita
- Okayama College, Kurashiki, Okayama
- ♀Okazaki Women's Junior College, Okazaki, Aichi
- Okinawa Christian Junior College, Nishihara, Okinawa
- Okinawa Women's Junior College, Naha, Okinawa
- Orio Aishin Junior College, Kitakyushu, Fukuoka
- Osaka Aoyama Junior College, Minoh, Osaka
- Osaka Chiyoda Junior College, Kawachinagano, Osaka
- Osaka Christian College, Osaka, Osaka
- Osaka Gakuin Junior College, Suita, Osaka
- ♀Osaka Jonan Women's Junior College, Osaka, Osaka
- ♀Osaka Jogakuin College, Osaka, Osaka
- Osaka Junior College of Music, Toyonaka, Osaka
- Osaka Junior College of Social Health and Welfare, Sakai, Osaka
- ♀Osaka Kun-ei Women's College, Settsu, Osaka
- Osaka Ohtani College, Tondabayashi, Osaka
- Osaka Seikei College, Osaka, Osaka
- ♀Osaka Shin-Ai College, Osaka, Osaka
- ♀Osaka Women's Junior College, Fujiidera, Osaka
- Osaka Yuhigaoka Gakuen Junior College, Osaka, Osaka
- Otemae College, Itami, Hyogo
- SANNO COLLEGE, Jiyugaoka, Setagaya, Tokyo
- Shinshu Junior College, Saku, Nagano
- Saga Junior College, Saga, Saga
- ♀Saga Women's Junior College, Saga, Saga
- ♀Saitama Junshin Junior College, Hanyū, Saitama
- ♀Saitama Women's Junior College, Hidaka, Saitama
- ♀Sakai Women's Junior College, Sakai, Osaka
- ♀Sakura no Seibo Junior College, Fukushima, Fukushima
- Sano College, Sano, Tochigi
- Sanyo Gakuen College, Okayama, Okayama
- ♀Sanyo Women's College, Hatsukaichi, Hiroshima
- Seibi Gakuen College, Kita, Tokyo
- ♀Seibo Jogakuin Junior College, Kyoto, Kyoto
- ♀Seika Women's Junior College, Fukuoka, Fukuoka
- ♀Seirei Women's Junior College, Akita, Akita
- ♀Seiryo Women's Junior College, Kanazawa, Ishikawa
- ♀Seisen Jogakuin College, Nagano, Nagano
- Seishin Ursula Gakuen Mission Junior College, Nobeoka, Miyazaki
- Seiwa Gakuen College, Sendai, Miyagi
- Senzoku Gakuen Junior College, Kawasaki, Kanagawa
- Setouchi Junior College, Takase, Kagawa
- Shiga Bunkyo Junior College, Nagahama, Shiga
- Shiga Junior College, Otsu, Shiga
- Shimonoseki Junior College, Shimonoseki, Yamaguchi
- Shiraume Gakuen Junior College, Kodaira, Tokyo
- Shoei Junior College, Kobe, Hyogo
- Shogen Junior College, Minokamo, Gifu
- ♀Shoinhigashi Women's Junior College, Higashiosaka, Osaka
- Shohoku College, Atsugi, Kanagawa
- Shonan Junior College, Yokosuka, Kanagawa
- Showagakuin Junior College, Ichikawa, Chiba
- Shuko Junior College, Ichinoseki, Iwate
- Shukugawa Gakuin College, Nishinomiya, Hyogo
- Shukutoku Junior College, Itabashi, Tokyo
- ♀Soka Women's College, Hachiōji, Tokyo
- ♀St. Cecilia Women's Junior College, Yamato, Kanagawa
- St. Margaret's Junior College, Suginami, Tokyo
- ♀Suzugamine Women's College, Hiroshima, Hiroshima
- Suzuka Junior College, Suzuka, Mie
- Takada Junior College, Tsu, Mie
- Takamatsu Junior College, Takamatsu, Kagawa
- Takayama College of Car Technology, Takayama, Gifu
- Teikyo Heisei Nursing Junior College, Ichihara, Chiba
- Teikyo Junior College, Shibuya, Tokyo
- Teikyougakuen Junior College, Hokuto, Yamanashi
- The Nippon Dental University College at Niigata, Niigata, Niigata
- The Nippon Dental University College at Tokyo, Chiyoda, Tokyo
- Toho Gakuen College of Drama and Music, Chofu, Tokyo
- ♀Tohoku Women's Junior College, Hirosaki, Aomori
- ♀Toita Women's College, Minato, Tokyo
- Tokai University Junior College of Nursing and Medical Technology, Hiratsuka, Kanagawa
- Tokiwa Junior College, Mito, Ibaraki
- Tokiwakai College, Osaka, Osaka
- Tokoha Gakuen Junior College, Shizuoka, Shizuoka
- Tokushima College of Technology, Itano, Tokushima
- Tokyo Bunka Junior College, Nakano, Tokyo
- Tokyo College of Transport Studies, Toshima, Tokyo
- ♀Tokyo Kasei-Gakuin Junior College, Chiyoda, Tokyo
- Tokyo Management College, Chiba, Chiba
- Tokyo Rissho Junior College, Suginami, Tokyo
- Tokyo Seitoku College, Kita, Tokyo
- ♀Tokyo Women's Junior College of Physical Education, Kunitachi, Tokyo
- Tottori College, Kurayoshi, Tottori
- Toyama College of Welfare Science, Kosugi, Toyama
- Toyama College, Toyama, Toyama
- Toyo College of Food Technology, Kawanishi, Hyogo
- ♀Toyoko Gakuen Women's College, Setagaya, Tokyo
- Tsukuba International Junior College, Tsuchiura, Ibaraki
- Tsuruga College, Tsuruga, Fukui
- Tsurukawa Jr. College, Machida, Tokyo
- ♀Ueda Women's Junior College, Ueda, Nagano
- Uekusa Gakuen Junior College, Chiba, Chiba
- Utsunomiya BUNSEI Junior College, Utsunomiya, Tochigi
- Utsunomiya Junior College, Utsunomiya, Tochigi
- Uyo Gakuen College, Tendo, Yamagata
- ♀Wakayama Shin-Ai Women's Junior College, Wakayama, Wakayama
- Yamagata Junior College, Yamagata, Yamagata
- Yamaguchi College of Arts, Yamaguchi, Yamaguchi
- Yamaguchi Junior College, Hofu, Yamaguchi
- Yamamura Gakuen College, Hatoyama, Saitama
- Yamano College of Aesthetics, Hachioji, Tokyo
- Yamawaki Gakuen Junior College, Minato, Tokyo
- Yamazaki College of Animal Health Technology, Hachioji, Tokyo
- Yokohama College of Art and Design, Yokohama, Kanagawa
- Yokohama Soei Junior College, Yokohama, Kanagawa
- ♀Yokohama Women's Junior College, Yokohama, Kanagawa
- ♀Yonezawa Women's Junior College, Yonezawa, Yamagata

♀ indicates a women's college

== Historical ==
- Allen International Junior College
- ♀Kanto Gakuin Women's Junior College, Yokohama, Kanagawa
- Kinki University Seito Junior College
- Himeji College of Hyogo
- Fujimigaoka Women's Junior College, Mishima, Shizuoka

♀ indicates a women's college

== See also ==
- Higher education in Japan
- List of universities in Japan
- List of current and historical women's universities and colleges in Japan
