= The Nippon Dental University College at Niigata =

Junior college in Niigata, Japan

Coordinates: 37°54′43″N 139°00′37″E

- 日本歯科大学新潟短期大学
- Type: Private
- Established: 1987
- Location: Chūō-ku, Niigata, Japan
- Website: http://www2.ndu.ac.jp/jc/

The Nippon Dental University College at Niigata (日本歯科大学新潟短期大学, Nihon Shika Daigaku Niigata Tanki Daigaku) is one of the private junior Colleges located at Chūō-ku, Niigata in Japan. It was established in 1987, and is now attached to The Nippon Dental University.

== Department and Graduate Course ==
=== Departments ===
- Department of dental hygiene

=== Advanced course ===
- Major of dental hygienist

== See also ==
- List of junior colleges in Japan
- The Nippon Dental University
- The Nippon Dental University College at Tokyo
