= Kochi Junior College =

Public junior college in Kōchi, Japan (1953-2020)

Coordinates: 33°33′49″N 133°32′03″E

- 高知短期大学
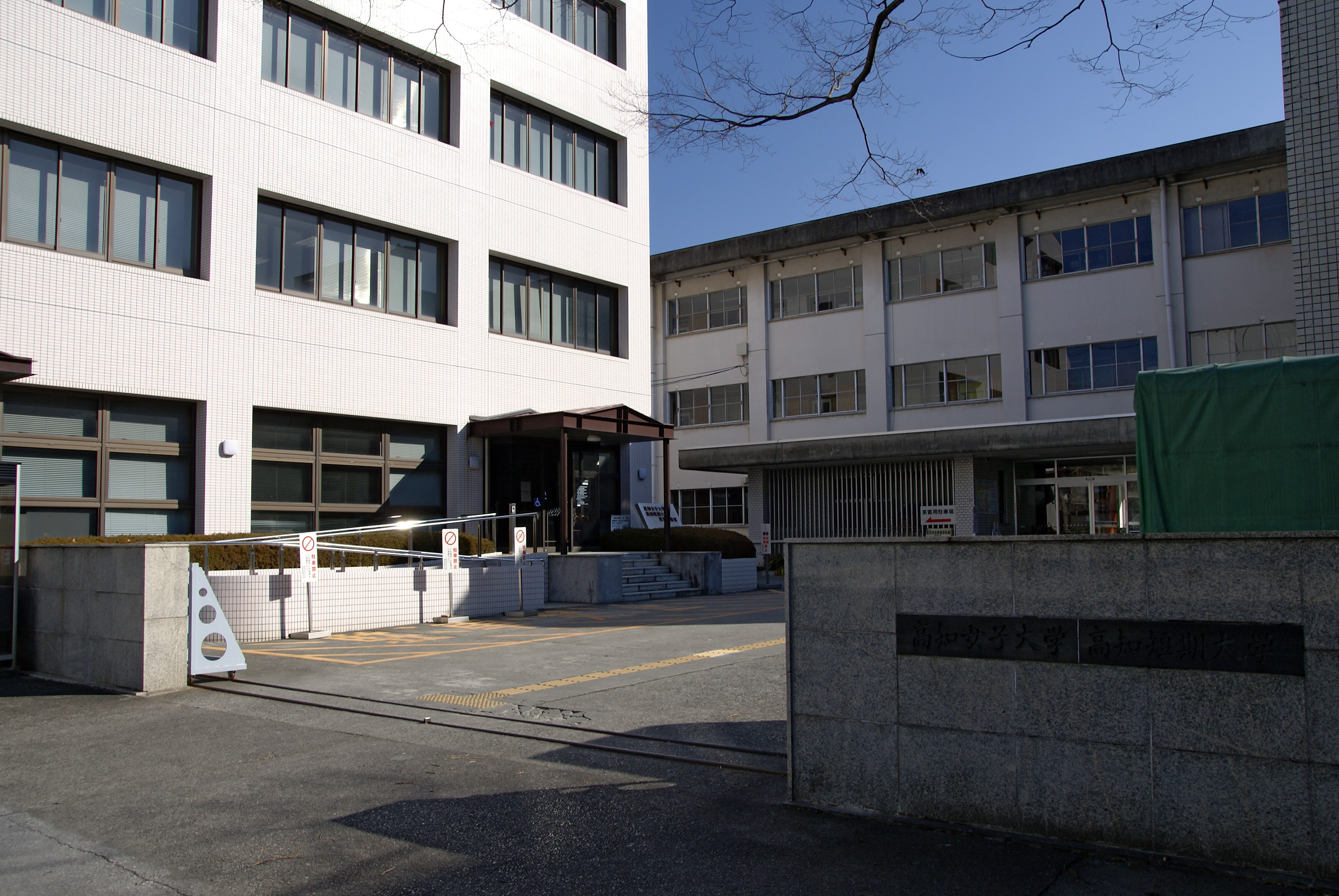
- Kochi Women's university
- Type: public
- Established: 1953
- Location: Kōchi, Kōchi, Japan
- Website: http://www.kochi-wu.ac.jp/kjc/

Kochi Junior College (高知短期大学, Kōchi Tanki Daigaku) was a public junior college in Kōchi, Kōchi, Japan. It was founded in 1953 and closed in February 3, 2020.

== Departments ==
- Department of social sciences

== See also ==
- List of junior colleges in Japan
