= Sakuyo Junior College of Music =

- 作陽音楽短期大学
- Type: Private junior college
- Established: 1951
- Location: Kurashiki, Okayama, Japan
- Website: ksu.ac.jp

Sakuyo Junior College of Music (作陽音楽短期大学, Sakuyō Ongaku Tanki Daigaku) is a private junior college in Kurashiki, Okayama, Japan.

== History ==
Sakuyo Junior College of Music was founded in 1951. In 1996, part of the campus was opened in the city of Okayama. The Tsuyama campus closed in 1999.

== Courses offered ==
- Music

== See also ==
- List of junior colleges in Japan
