= Shoei College =

Shoei College may refer to:

- Shoei Girls' Junior and Senior High School, a junior and senior high school for girls in Shirokanedai, Minato, Tokyo
- Shoei Junior College in Kobe
