= Niigata Junior College of Nursing =

College in Niigata Prefecture, Japan

Coordinates: 37°6′20.5″N 138°16′6.4″E

- 新潟県立看護短期大学
- Type: public
- Established: 1994
- Location: Jōetsu, Niigata, Japan
- Website: http://www.niigata-cn.ac.jp/tandai/

Niigata Junior College of Nursing (新潟県立看護短期大学, Niigata Kenritsu Kango Tanki Daigaku) was a public junior college in Jōetsu, Niigata, Japan. It was established in 1977 as vocational school, and became a junior college in 1994. It was closed on March 31, 2005.

== Academic departments ==
- Nursing

== Advanced courses ==
- Public Health Nurse studies
- Midwifery studies

== See also ==
- List of junior colleges in Japan
