= Shoin University (disambiguation) =

- Shoin University

Several different Japanese institutions of higher learning also contain the name Shoin.

- Kobe Shoin Women's University
- Osaka Shoin Women's College
- Shoin Higashi Junior Women's College
