= Saho =

Saho may refer to:

== People ==
- Saho people, an ethnic group living largely in the Horn of Africa
- Saho-hime (狭穂姫命; ?-25 BC), the legendary empress consort of Japan
- Saho Harada (原田 早穂; born 1982), Japanese synchronized swimmer
- Saho Iwatate (岩立 沙穂; born 1994), Japanese idol and member of AKB48
- Saho Sasazawa (笹沢 左保; 1930–2002), Japanese author
- Saho Shirasu (白砂 沙帆), Japanese voice actress
- Saho Tenamachi (手名町 紗帆), Japanese manga artist
- Saho Tōno (冬野 さほ; born 1970), Japanese manga artist
- Saho Yoshino (吉野 紗帆; born 1999), Japanese kickboxer
- Akari Saho (佐保 明梨; born 1995), Japanese singer
- Lamin Saho, African singer

== Places ==
- Nara Saho College, a private junior college in the city of Nara

== Films ==
- Saaho, a 2019 film
- Saho (film), a 2023 Sri Lankan film

== Languages ==
- Saho language, the language of the Saho people
- Saho–Afar languages, are a dialect-cluster belonging to the Cushitic branch of the Afro-Asiatic family

== See also ==
- Saho People's Democratic Movement, an organized group in Eritrea, fighting for the self-determination of the Saho people.
