= Kobe Yamate College =

- 神戸山手短期大学
- Type: Private junior college
- Active: 1950–2020
- Academic staff: Art, career & communication, homemaking
- Location: Chūō-ku, Kobe, Hyōgo Prefecture, Japan
- Website: www.kobe-yamate.ac.jp/college/

Kobe Yamate College (神戸山手短期大学, Kōbe Yamate Tanki Daigaku) is a private junior college in Chūō-ku, Kobe in Hyōgo Prefecture, Japan. It was established in 1950 and closed in 2020.

== History ==
The school was founded in 1924 as Yamate Gakushuin (山手学習院, Yamate Gakushuin). The junior college opened in April 1950 for women, but in 2004, it became coeducational, adopting the present name at the same time.

== Courses ==
It offers courses in art, career & communication, and homemaking.

== See also ==
- List of junior colleges in Japan
