= Allen International Junior College =

Coordinates: 40°11′9.8″N 141°46′8.3″E

- アレン国際短期大学
- Type: private
- Active: 1970–2007
- Location: Kuji, Iwate, Japan

Allen International Junior College (アレン国際短期大学, Allen Kokusai Tanki Daigaku) was a private junior college in Kuji, Iwate, Japan. It was founded in 1935 by Tamasine Allen, an American woman preacher as a kindergarten, expanding to a school in 1952, and to a junior college in 1970, with a Department of Human Communication which offered courses in tourism-related English language, international business and the humanities. It was renamed the Allen International Junior College in 1995. Due to declining admissions, the school was closed in 2007.

== See also ==
- List of junior colleges in Japan
