= Himeji College of Hyogo =

Public college in Hyōgo Prefecture, Japan

Coordinates: 34.77222°N 134.75868°E

- 姫路短期大学
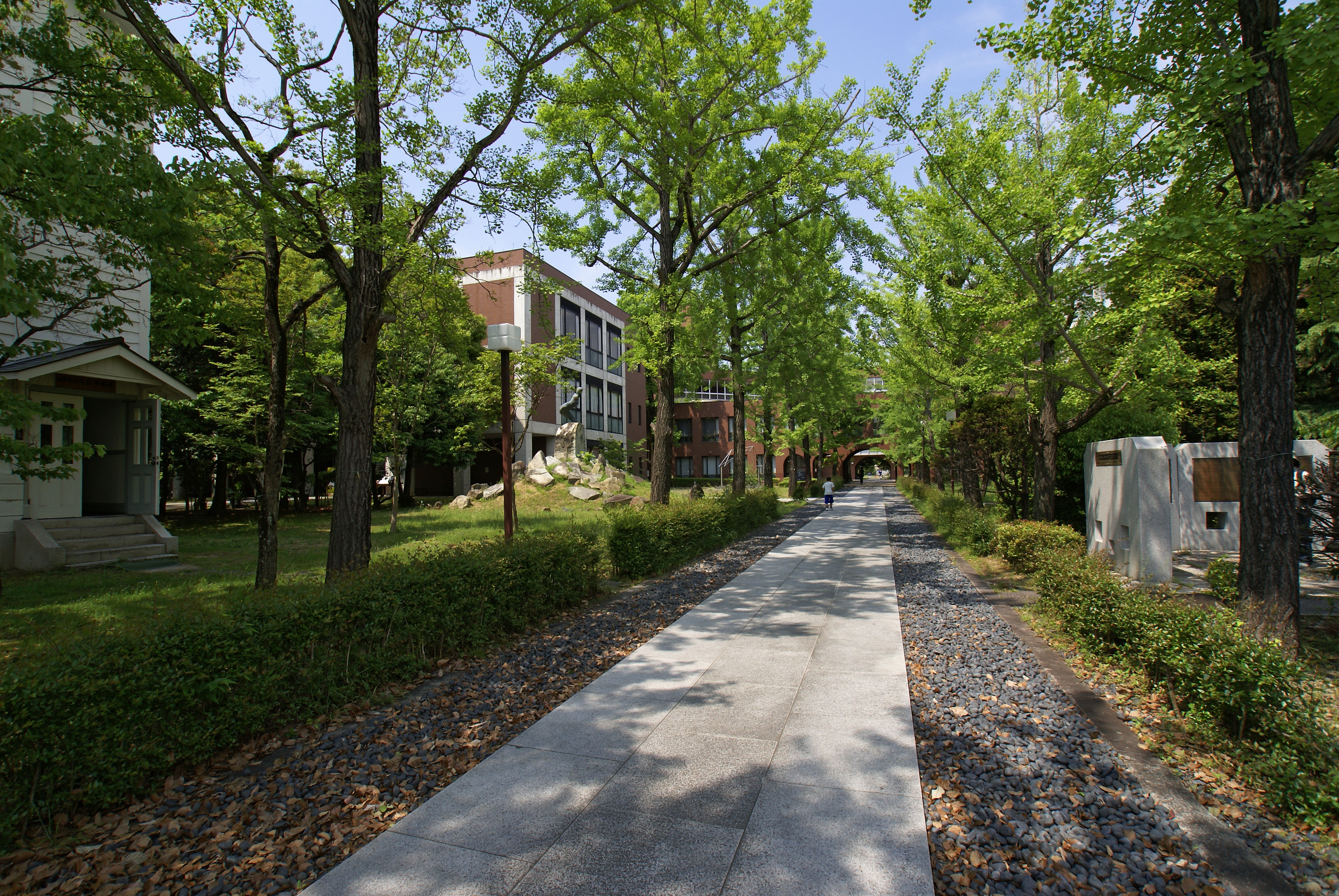
- Type: Public junior college
- Active: 1950–1999
- Location: Himeji, Hyōgo, Japan

Himeji College of Hyogo (姫路短期大学, Himeji Tanki Daigaku) was a public junior college in Himeji, Hyōgo, Japan.

== History ==
The college opened in April 1950. It closed in 1999.

== Courses offered ==
- Food and nutrition
- Home making
- Child care
- Business administration and information science

== See also ==
- Hyogo University
- List of junior colleges in Japan
