= Okinawa Christian Junior College =

- 沖縄キリスト教短期大学
- Type: Private
- Established: 1959
- Location: Nishihara, Okinawa, Japan
- Website: https://www.ocjc.ac.jp/

Okinawa Christian Junior College (沖縄キリスト教短期大学, Okinawa Kirisuto-kyō Tanki Daigaku) is a private junior college in Nishihara, Okinawa, Japan. It was established in 1959 as a junior college for United States Civil Administration of the Ryukyu Islands. The predecessor of the school was founded in 1957. In 1972 it was changed to native college.

In 1984 Rupert Bruce-Mitford found it necessary to sell his library, which went to Okinawa Christian Junior College.

== Academic departments ==
- English studies
- Child care studies
- Christianity studies

== Advanced course ==
- No

== See also ==
- List of junior colleges in Japan
- Okinawa Christian University
