= Chukyo Junior College =

Private junior college in Mizunami, Gifu, Japan

- 中京学院大学中京短期大学部
- Type: Private junior college
- Established: 1966
- Location: Mizunami, Gifu, Japan
- Website: www.chukyogakuin-u.ac.jp/department/junior-college/index.html

Chukyo Junior College (中京学院大学中京短期大学部, Chūkyō Gakuin Daigaku Chukyo Tanki Daigaku) is a private junior college in Mizunami, Gifu, Japan.

== History ==
The college was founded in 1966.

== Courses offered ==
- Child care
- Food
- Nutrition

== See also ==
- Chukyo University
- List of junior colleges in Japan
