= Osaka Ohtani College =

Coordinates: 34°28′55.7″N 135°34′51.8″E

- 大阪大谷大学短期大学部
- Type: Private
- Established: 1950
- Location: Tondabayashi, Osaka Prefecture, Japan
- Website: www.osaka-ohtani.ac.jp

Osaka Ohtani College (大阪大谷大学短期大学部, Ōsaka Ōtani Daigaku Tanki Daigakubu) is a private junior college in Tondabayashi, Osaka Prefecture, Japan. It was established in 1950 and became coeducational in 2006.

== See also ==
- List of junior colleges in Japan
