= Hachinohe Gakuin Junior College =

Private junior college in Hachinohe, Aomori Prefecture, Japan

Coordinates: 40°28′07″N 141°35′23″E

- 八戸学院短期大学
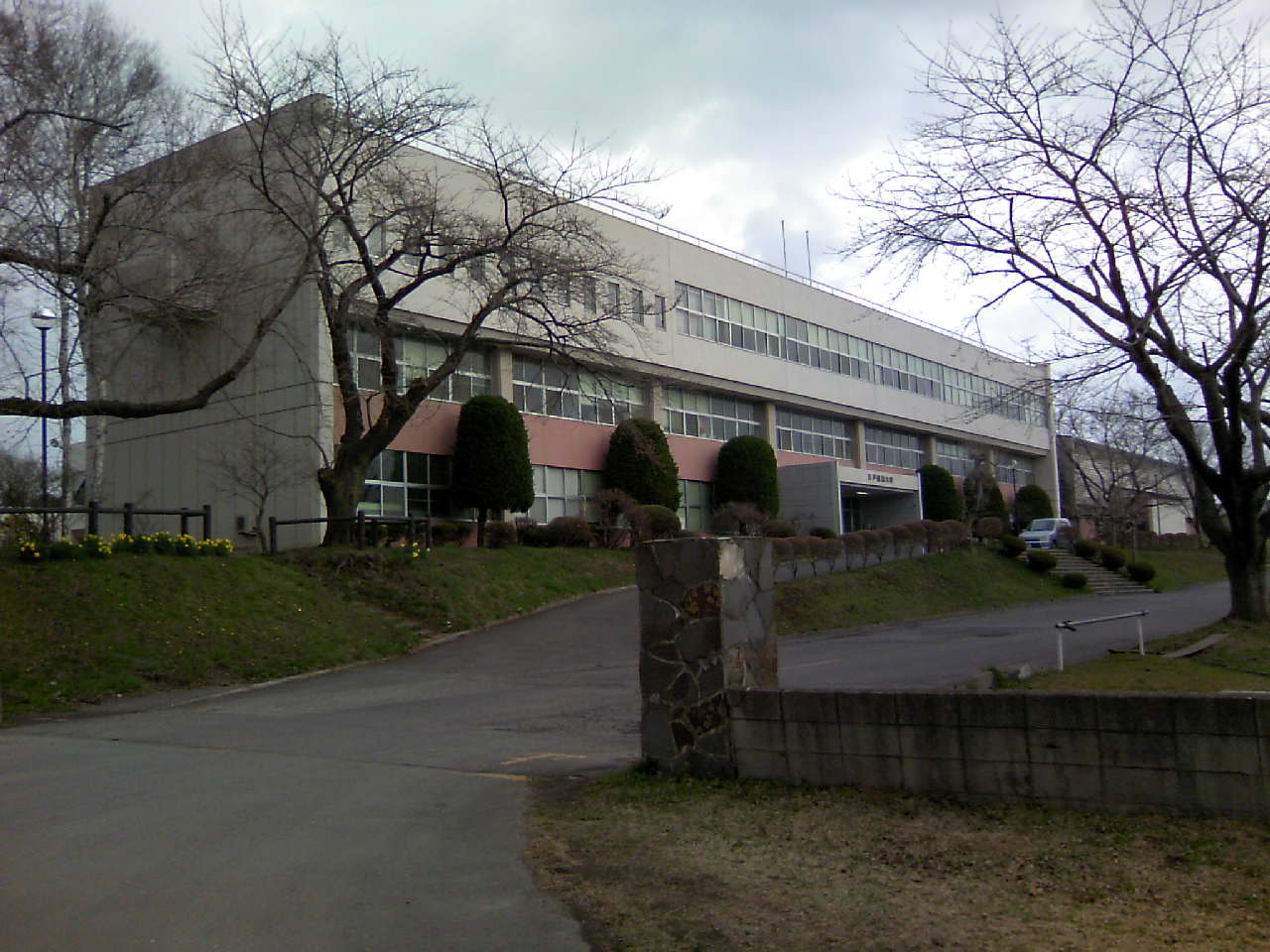
- Type: Private
- Established: 1971
- Location: Hachinohe, Aomori, Japan
- Website: www.hachinohe-u.ac.jp/tandai/

Hachinohe Gakuin Junior College (八戸学院短期大学, Hachinohe Gakuin Tanki Daigaku) is a private junior college located in Hachinohe, Aomori Prefecture, Japan. It was established in 1971, and is now attached to Hachinohe Gakuin University.

== Departments ==
- Early Childhood Education
- Life Design
- Nursing

== See also ==
- List of junior colleges in Japan
- Hachinohe Gakuin University
