= Okayama College =

Private junior college in Kurashiki, Okayama, Japan

- 岡山短期大学
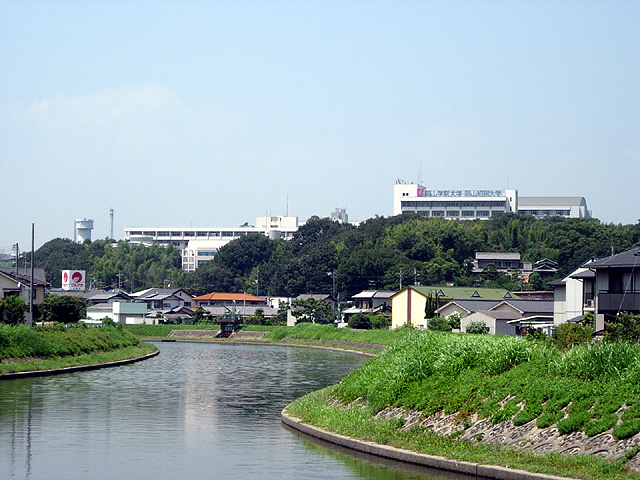
- Type: Private
- Established: 1951
- Location: Kurashiki, Okayama, Japan
- Website: http://www.owc.ac.jp/oc/oc_gakka.html

Okayama College (岡山短期大学, Okayama Tanki Daigakubu) is a private junior college in Kurashiki, Okayama, Japan. The junior college opened in April 1951 as a women's college. It became coeducational in 2000.

== See also ==
- List of junior colleges in Japan
