= College of Industrial Technology =

Private junior college in Amagasaki, Hyogo, Japan

Coordinates: 34°46′13″N 135°22′56″E

- 産業技術短期大学
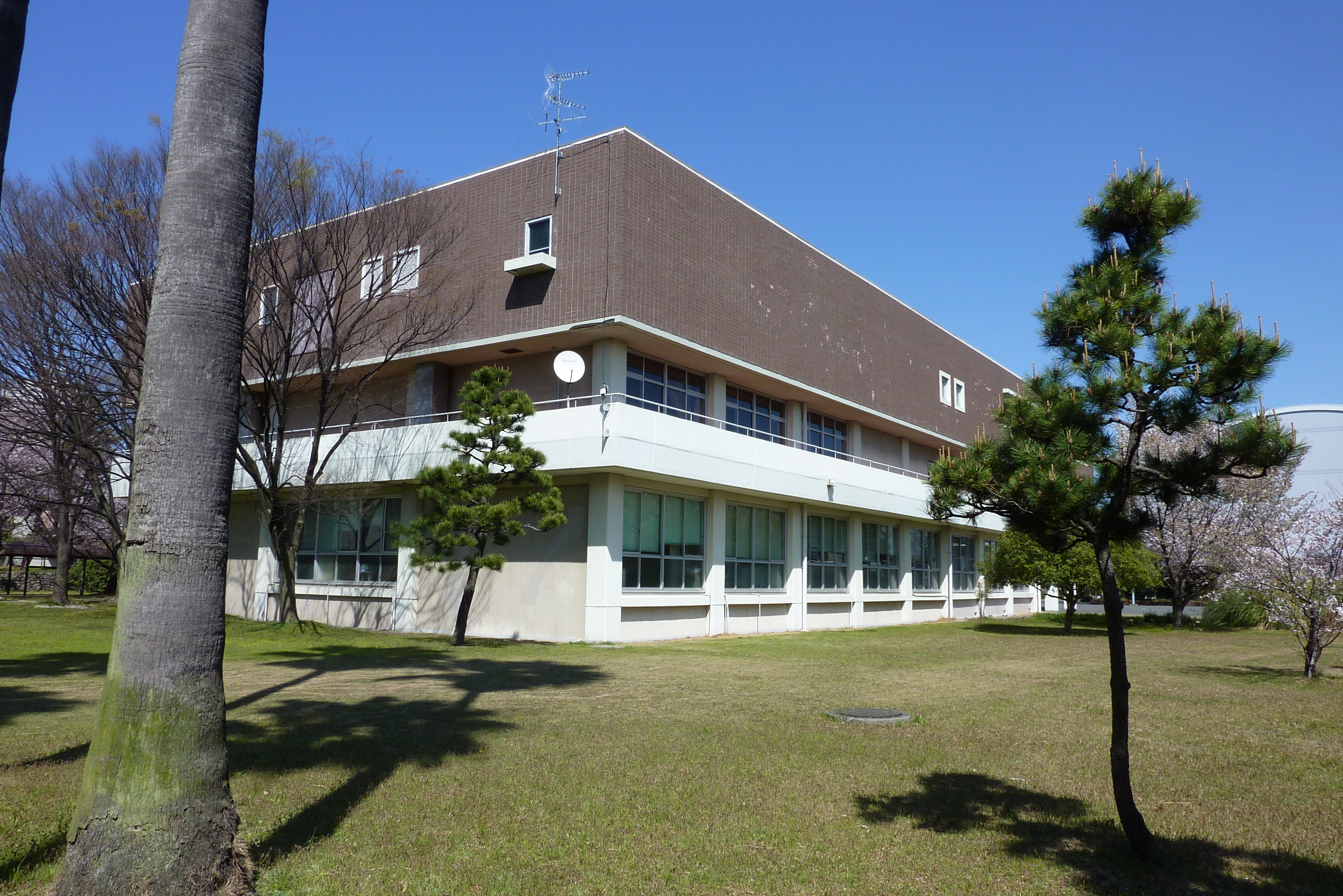
- Type: private
- Established: 1962
- Location: Amagasaki, Hyogo, Japan
- Website: www.sangitan.ac.jp

College of Industrial Technology (産業技術短期大学, Sangyo Gijutsu Tanki Daigaku) is a private junior college in Amagasaki, Hyogo, Japan. The Japan Iron and Steel Federation Corp considered it necessary to provide specialized training to engineers who would work in the iron and steel industry in 1962. It consists of four departments now. Moreover, it is one of the very few industry-specific junior colleges in Japan.

== Department and Graduate Course ==
=== Departments ===
- Department of system design engineering
- Department of Mechanical engineering
- Department of electric and Electronic Engineering
- Department of information processing engineering

=== Advanced courses ===
- Department of Industrial engineering
- Department of electricity and information engineering

=== Available certifications ===
- Students in the department of electrical and electronic engineering can earn professional certification as an electrician.

== See also ==
- List of junior colleges in Japan
