= Bunkyo Gakuin College =

Private junior college in Bunkyō, Tokyo, Japan

Coordinates: 35°43′5.6″N 139°45′25.2″E

- 文京学院短期大学
- Type: private
- Established: 1962
- Location: Bunkyō, Tokyo, Japan
- Website: www.u-bunkyo.ac.jp/ell/

Bunkyo Gakuin College (文京学院短期大学, Bunkyo Gakuin Tanki Daigaku) is a private junior college in Bunkyō, Tokyo, Japan.

It was set up as a women's junior college in 1963, and became coeducational in 2006. After a new schoolhouse had been built to Ōi, Saitama (at present Fujimino, Saitama), it became three systems of the subject in 1982. It became a single department junior college again in April 1997.

== Department and Graduate Course ==
=== Departments ===
- Department of English

=== Advanced course ===
- No

=== Available certifications ===
- Second class License for junior high school teacher (subject: English) was put as a teacher-training before.

== Access ==
The Hongō campus is located just up the street from the University of Tokyo. It is directly outside Exit #2 of Tōdaimae Station on the Tokyo Metro Namboku Line. It is about a 10-minute walk from Hakusan Station on the Toei Mita Line and about a 10-minute walk from Nezu Station on the Tokyo Metro Chiyoda Line.

== See also ==
- List of junior colleges in Japan
