= Osaka Gakuin Junior College =

- 大阪学院短期大学
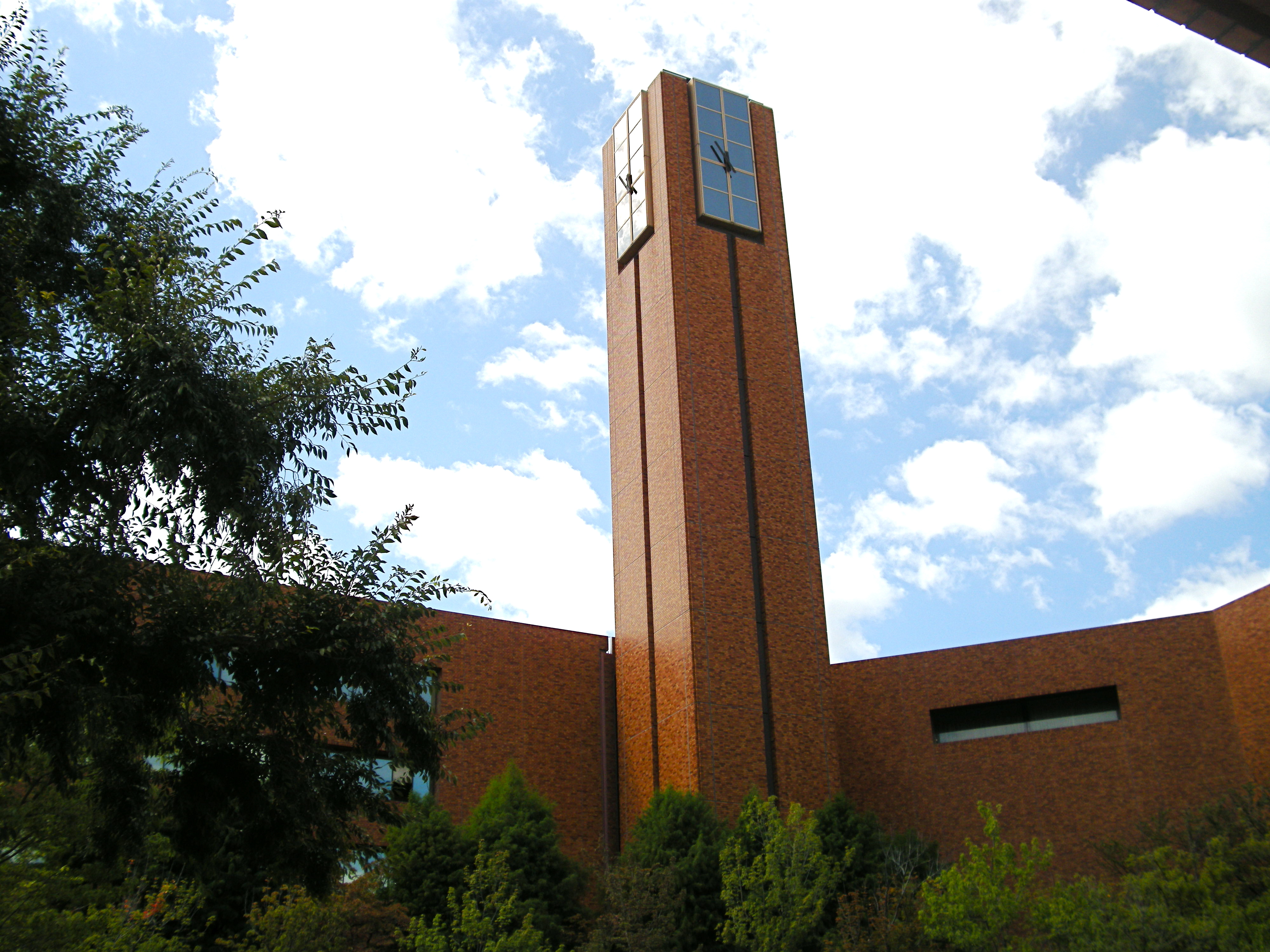
- Type: Private women's college
- Established: 1962
- Location: Suita, Osaka, Japan
- Website: www.osaka-gu.ac.jp/index.html

Osaka Gakuin Junior College (大阪学院短期大学, Ōsaka Gakuin Tanki Daigakubu) is a private junior college in Suita, Osaka, Japan.

== History ==
The college opened with a single academic department in April 1962. In April 1987, the second academic department was set up, but this was discontinued on May 31, 2009.

== See also ==
- List of junior colleges in Japan
