= Aomori Chuo Junior College =

Private junior college in Aomori, Japan

Coordinates: 40°47′02″N 140°45′49″E

- 青森中央短期大学
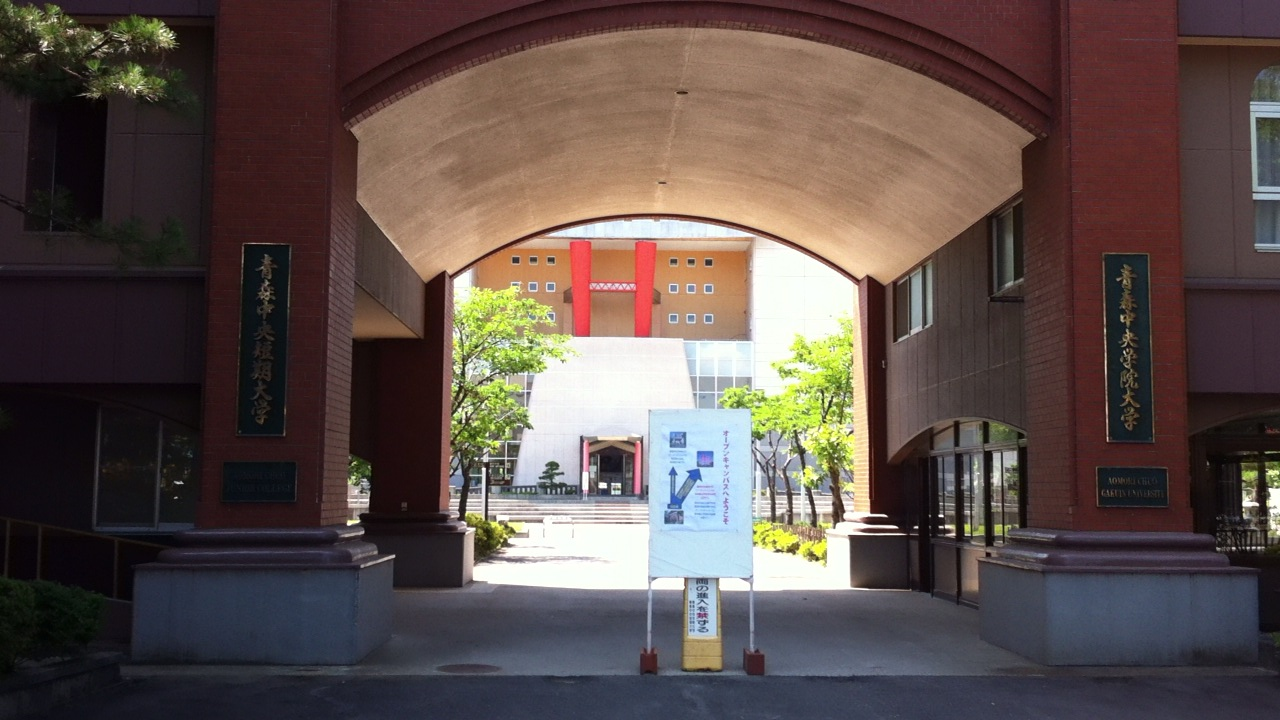
- Type: Private
- Established: 1970
- Location: Aomori, Aomori Prefecture, Japan
- Website: www.chutan.ac.jp

Aomori Chuo Junior College (青森中央短期大学, Aomori Chūō Tanki Daigaku) is a private junior college located in the city of Aomori, Japan. Originally a women's college, it became coeducational in April 1974.

First-year students are required to learn and practice traditional music including taiko drumming for the Aomori Nebuta Festival.

== Departments ==
- Department of Food Nutrition
- Department of Early Education
- Department Nursing
- Department of Caregiving

== See also ==
- List of junior colleges in Japan
