= Kinki University Seito Junior College =

- 近畿大学青踏女子短期大学
- Type: private
- Location: Wakayama, Wakayama, Japan

Kinki University Seito Junior College (近畿大学青踏女子短期大学, Kinki Daigaku Seito Joshi Tanki Daigakubu) was a private junior college in Wakayama, Wakayama, Japan. It was established in 1972.

== History ==
- 1972 Junior College was set up in Gobō, Wakayama.
- 1986 Campus was moved to Wakayama, Wakayama.
- 2000 The last year of registration of students.
- 2002 Junior College was discontinued.

== Names of Academic department ==
- English literature

== See also ==
- List of junior colleges in Japan
