= Hosen Gakuen College =

Japanese private junior college

- 宝仙学園短期大学
- Type: private
- Active: 1951–2010
- Location: Nakano, Tokyo, Japan; 35.6988527°N 139.6804514°E
- Website: www.hosen.ac.jp

Hosen Gakuen College (宝仙学園短期大学, Hosen Gakuen Tanki Daigaku) was a private junior college in Nakano, Tokyo, Japan. It was established in 1951, became coeducational in 2001, and closed in 2010.

== See also ==
- List of junior colleges in Japan
