= Tohoku Women's Junior College =

- 東北女子短期大学
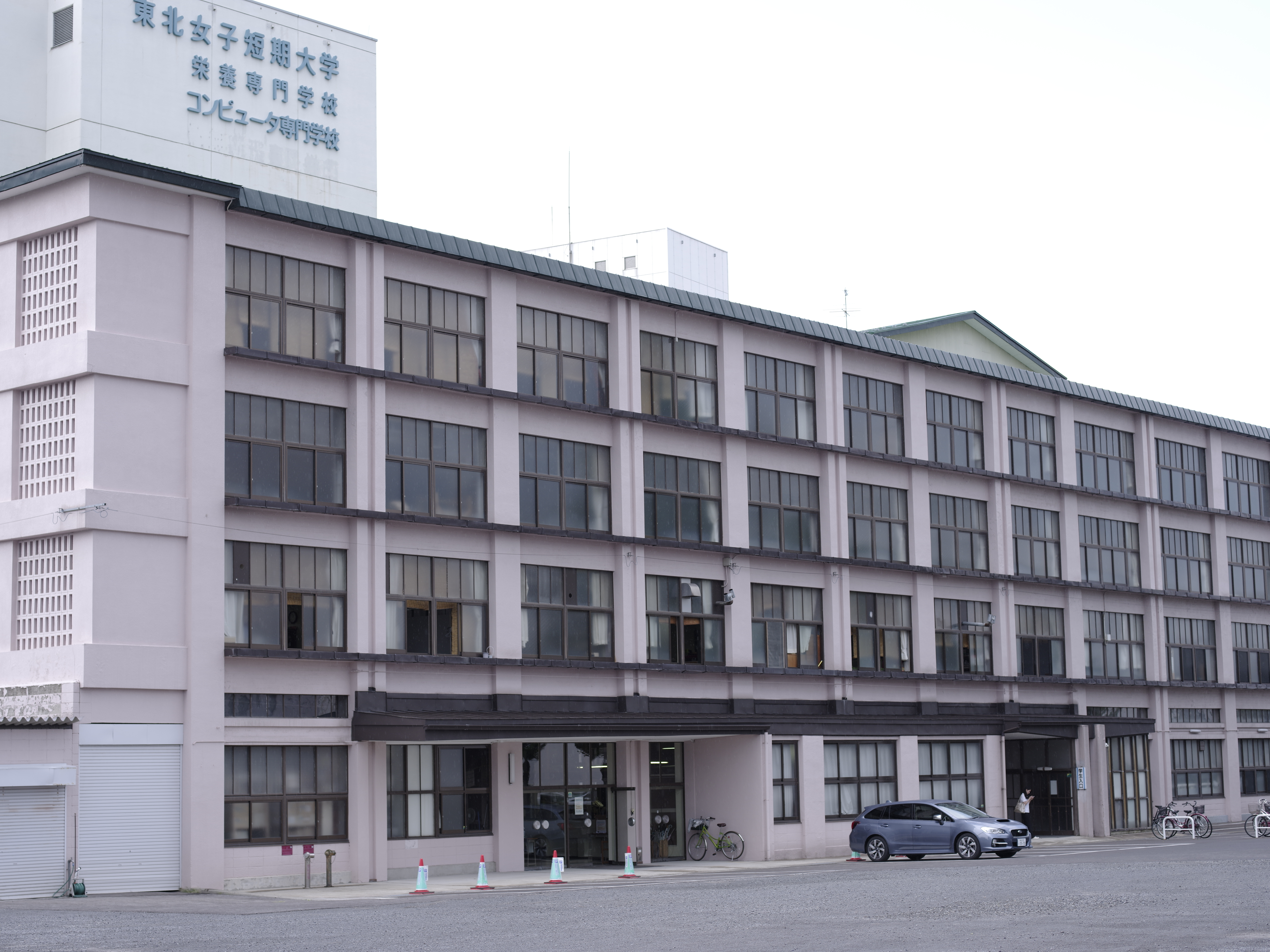
- Tohoku Women's Junior College
- Type: Private
- Established: 1950
- Location: Hirosaki, Aomori, Japan; 40.6006°N 140.4768°E
- Website: http://www.toutan.ac.jp/

Tohoku Women's Junior College (東北女子短期大学, Tōhoku Joshi Tanki Daigaku) is a private junior college in Hirosaki, Aomori Prefecture, Japan. It was established in 1950, and is now attached to Tohoku Women's College.

== Departments ==
- Department of Clothing
- Department of Home Economics
- Department of Child Care

== See also ==
- List of junior colleges in Japan
