= Seishi Ursula Gakuen Junior College =

Coordinates: 32°32′50″N 131°40′44″E

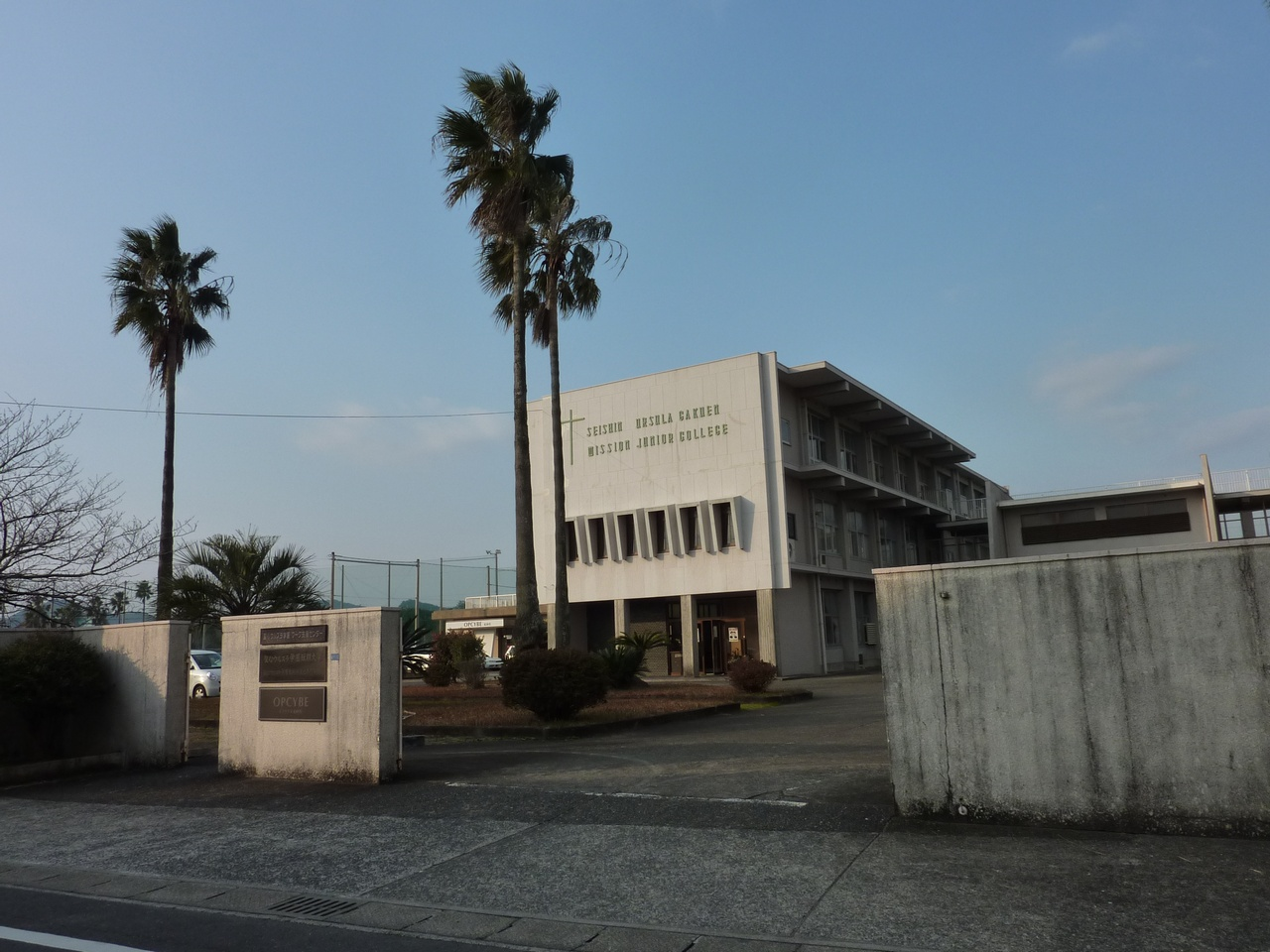

Seishin Ursula Gakuen Junior College (聖心ウルスラ学園短期大学, Seishin urusura gakuen tanki daigaku) was a private junior college in Nobeoka, Miyazaki, Japan, established in 1967. The present name was adopted in 1991. Originally a women's college, it began admitting male students in 1997. It closed down in 2011.
