= Meiwa Gakuen Junior College =

Coordinates: 36°24′20.5″N 139°3′46.6″E

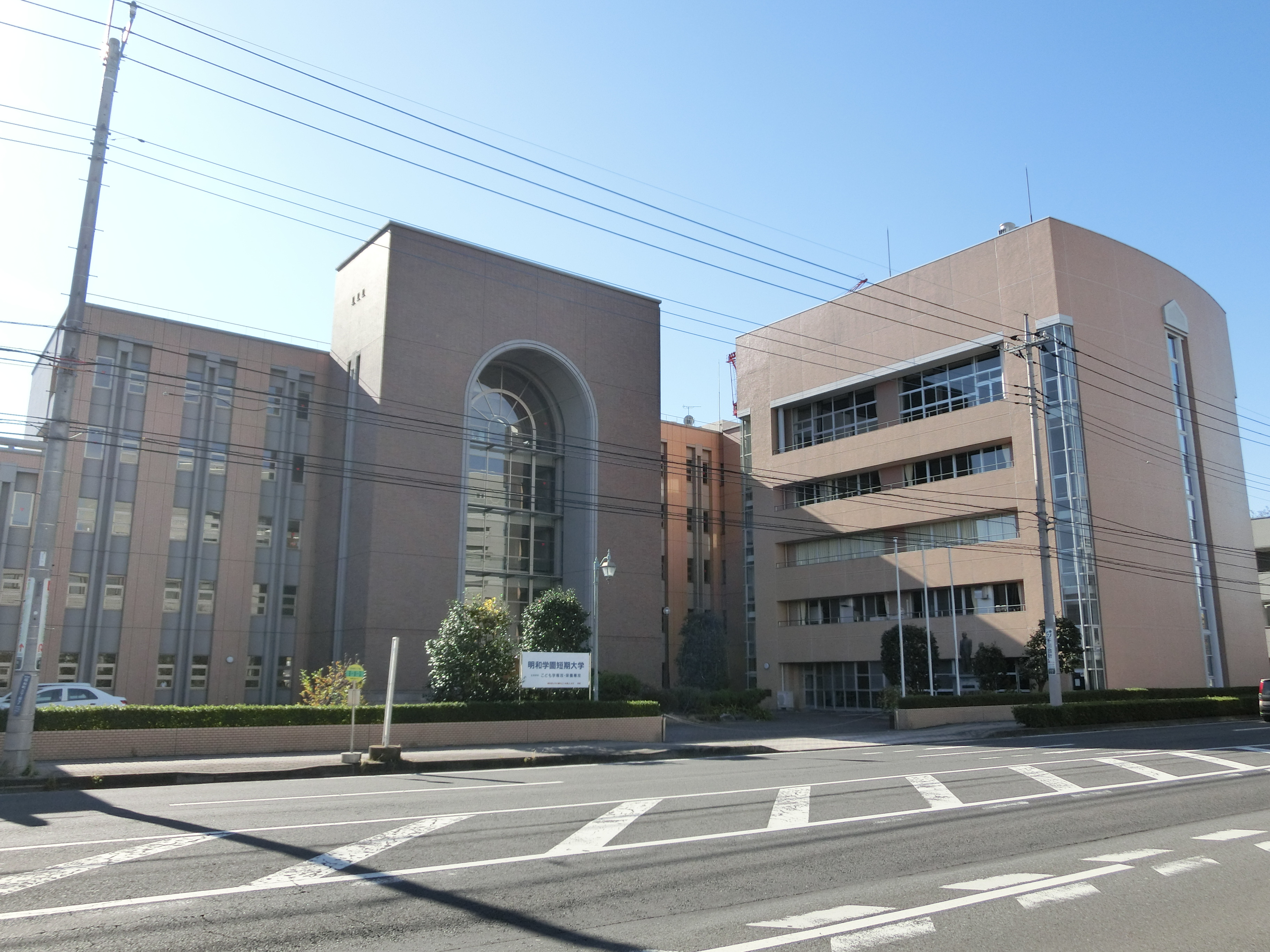
Meiwa Gakuen Junior College

Meiwa Gakuen Junior College (明和学園短期大学, Meiwa gakuen tanki daigaku) is a private junior college in Maebashi, Gunma, Japan. The predecessor of the school, founded in 1933, was chartered as a women's junior college in 1965. In 1999 it became coeducational.
