= Teikyo Junior College =

Private junior college in Japan

Coordinates: 35°40′52.7″N 139°40′40.6″E

- 帝京短期大学
- Type: Private
- Established: 1962
- Location: Shibuya, Tokyo, Japan
- Website: www.teikyo-jc.ac.jp

Teikyo Junior College (帝京短期大学, Teikyo Tanki Daigaku) is a private junior college in Shibuya, Tokyo, Japan. It was established as a women's college in 1962, and became coeducational in 2006. In 2009, it set up a distance education program.

== See also ==
- Teikyo University
