= Tohoku Bunkyo Junior College =

Coordinates: 38°12′33.6″N 140°18′10.7″E

- 東北文教大学短期大学部
- Type: Private
- Established: 1966
- Location: Yamagata, Yamagata, Japan
- Website: http://www.t-bunkyo.jp/

Tohoku Bunkyo Junior College (東北文教大学短期大学部, Tōhoku Bunkyo Daigaku Tankidaigakubu) is a private junior college in Yamagata, Yamagata, Japan. The predecessor of the school was founded in 1951. It was chartered as a junior women's college in 1966, and it became coeducational in 2001.
