= Osaka Aoyama Junior College =

Coordinates: 34°50′2.6″N 135°27′25″E

Osaka Aoyama Junior College (大阪青山短期大学, Ōsaka aoyama tanki daigaku) is a private junior college in Minoh, Osaka, Japan, established in 1967 and closed on March 31, 2021.

== History ==
1967

- Opening of Osaka Aoyama Women's Junior College (Department of Home Economics and Department of Early Childhood Education)

1973

- Name changed to Osaka Aoyama Junior College

1981

- Establishment of the Japanese Literature Department

1983

- Completion of tennis courts and a clubhouse

1986

- Establishment of the English Language Department

1996

- Opening of a gymnasium at the campus

1999

- Opening of the Osaka Aoyama Museum of Historical Literature
- All departments changed to coeducation

2005

- Opening of Osaka Aoyama University (Department of Health and Nutrition in the Faculty of Health Sciences)

2006

- Abolition of the Life Design Major and Food and Nutrition Major
- Abolition of the English Communication Department

2008

- Establishment of the Health and Child Development Department in the Faculty of Health Sciences

2010

- Abolition of the Language and Culture Department

2015

- Establishment of the Nursing Department in the Faculty of Health Sciences

2017

- Abolition of the Early Childhood Education and Care Department

2021

- Closing of Osaka Aoyama Junior College
