= Nagasaki Gyokusei Junior College =

Coordinates: 32°44′29″N 129°53′21″E

Nagasaki Gyokusei Junior College (長崎玉成短期大学, Nagasaki gyokusei tanki daigaku) was a private junior college in Nagasaki, Nagasaki, Japan. The predecessor of the school, a sewing school, was founded in 1892. It was chartered as a women's junior college in 1953 and became coeducational in 2007. It closed down in March 2012.
