= Koen Gakuen Women's Junior College =

Japanese women's college

Coordinates: 42°59′50.8″N 141°21′12″E

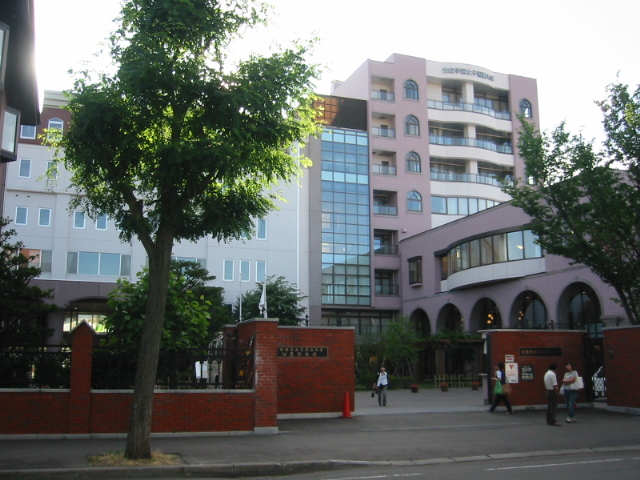
The main gate of Koen Gakuen Women's College.

Koen Gakuen Women's College (光塩学園女子短期大学, Kōen gakuen joshi tanki daigaku) is a private junior women's college in Sapporo, Hokkaido, Japan, established in 1967.
