= Kagawa Junior College =

Private junior college in Utazu, Kagawa, Japan

Coordinates: 34°18′35″N 133°48′31″E

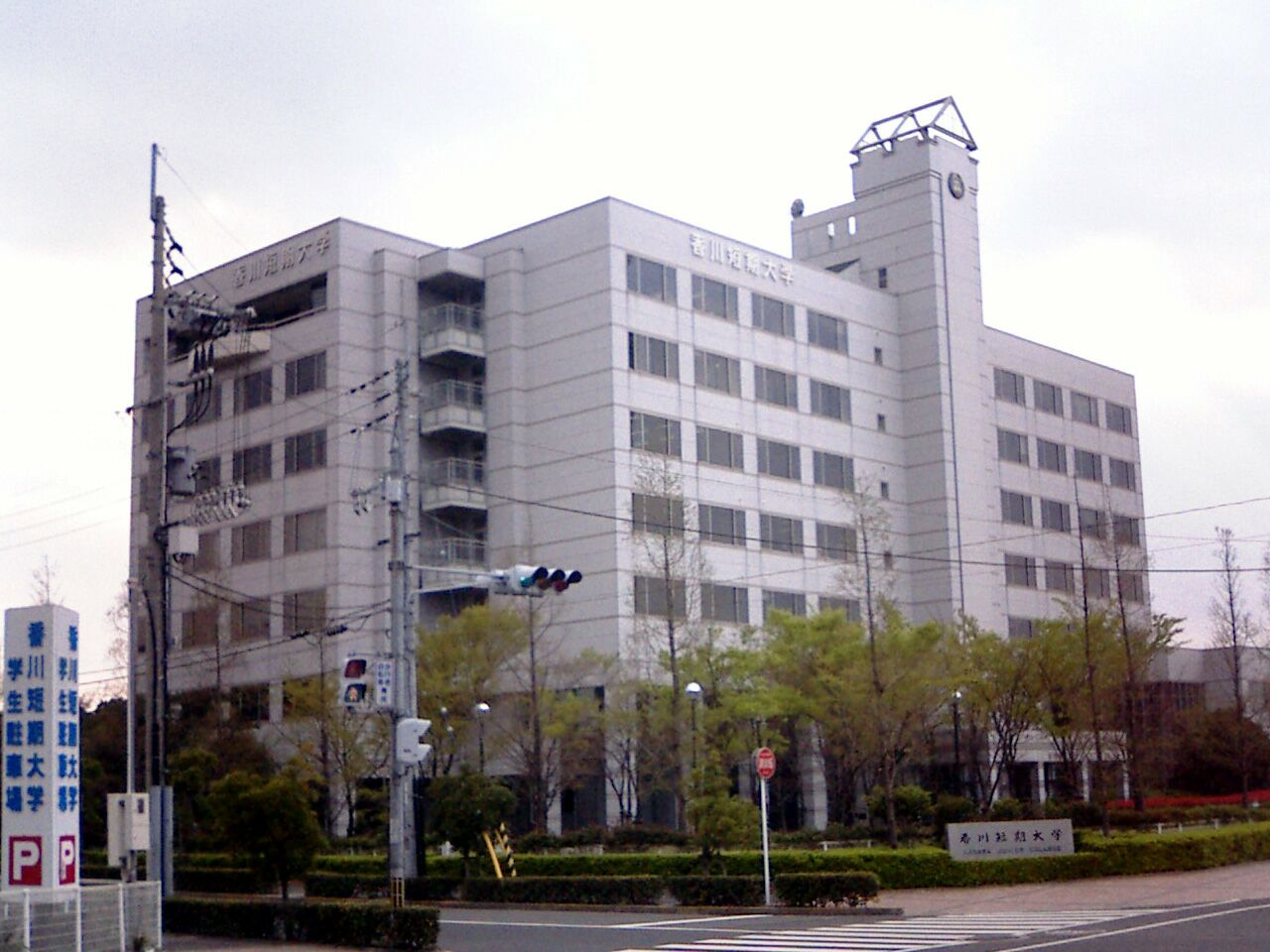
Kagawa Junior College

Kagawa Junior College (香川短期大学, Kagawa tanki daigaku) is a private junior college in Utazu, Kagawa, Japan, established in 1967.
