= Ashiya College =

Private junior college in Ashiya, Hyōgo, Japan

Coordinates: 34°45′14.9″N 135°18′25.4″E

- 芦屋学園短期大学
- Type: Private junior college
- Established: 1960
- Academic staff: Early childhood education
- Location: Ashiya, Hyōgo, Japan
- Website: www.ashiya-c.ac.jp

Ashiya College (芦屋学園短期大学, Ashiya Gakuen Tanki Daigaku) is a private junior college in Ashiya, Hyōgo, Japan.

== History ==
The college was established in 1960. In 2011, it became coeducational, adopting the present name at the same time.

== Courses ==
- Early childhood education
- Homemaking
- English studies
- Personal care
