= Yamazaki College of Animal Health Technology =

Japanese college specializing in Animal Health Technology

- ヤマザキ動物看護短期大学
- Type: Private
- Established: 1960
- Location: Hachiōji, Tokyo, Tokyo, Japan
- Website: Yamazaki College of Animal Health Technology

Yamazaki College of Animal Health Technology (ヤマザキ動物看護短期大学, Yamazaki Dōbutsu Kango Tanki Daigaku) was a private Junior College in the city of Hachiōji, Tokyo, Japan. It was established as specialized school in 1960. It became Junior college in 2004. The school closed on March 31, 2012.
