= Yokohama Soei Junior College =

Private junior college in Midori-ku, Yokohama, Kanagawa Prefecture, Japan

Coordinates: 35°30′45″N 139°30′38″E

- 横浜創英短期大学; Yokohama sōei tanki daigaku
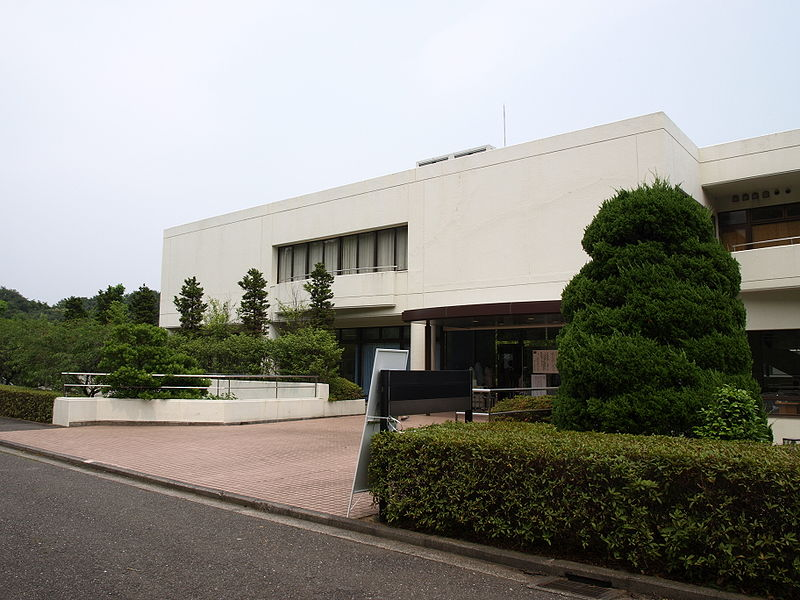
- Type: Private
- Established: 1989
- Location: Midori-ku, Yokohama, Kanagawa, Japan
- Website: Official website

Yokohama Sōei Junior College (横浜創英短期大学, Yokohama sōei tanki daigaku) is a private junior college in Midori-ku, Yokohama, Kanagawa Prefecture, Japan, established in 1989.
