= Seibo Jogakuin Junior College =

Private women's junior college in Kyoto, Kyoto, Japan

Coordinates: 34°57′29.6″N 135°46′24.5″E

Seibo Jogakuin Junior College (聖母女学院短期大学, Seibo jogakuin tanki daigaku) is a private women's junior college in Kyoto, Kyoto, Japan, established in 1962.
