= Ichinomiya Women's Junior College =

Coordinates: 35°18′4.3″N 136°46′55.5″E

Ichinomiya Women's Junior College (一宮女子短期大学, Ichinomiya joshi tanki daigaku) is a private women's junior college in the city of Ichinomiya in Aichi Prefecture, Japan. The predecessor of the school was founded in 1941, and it was chartered as a university in 1955.

== Alumni ==
- Mayumi Hashimoto, CEO of Book Off.
