= Osaka Junior College of Social Health and Welfare =

Coordinates: 34°34′43.8″N 135°29′45.3″E

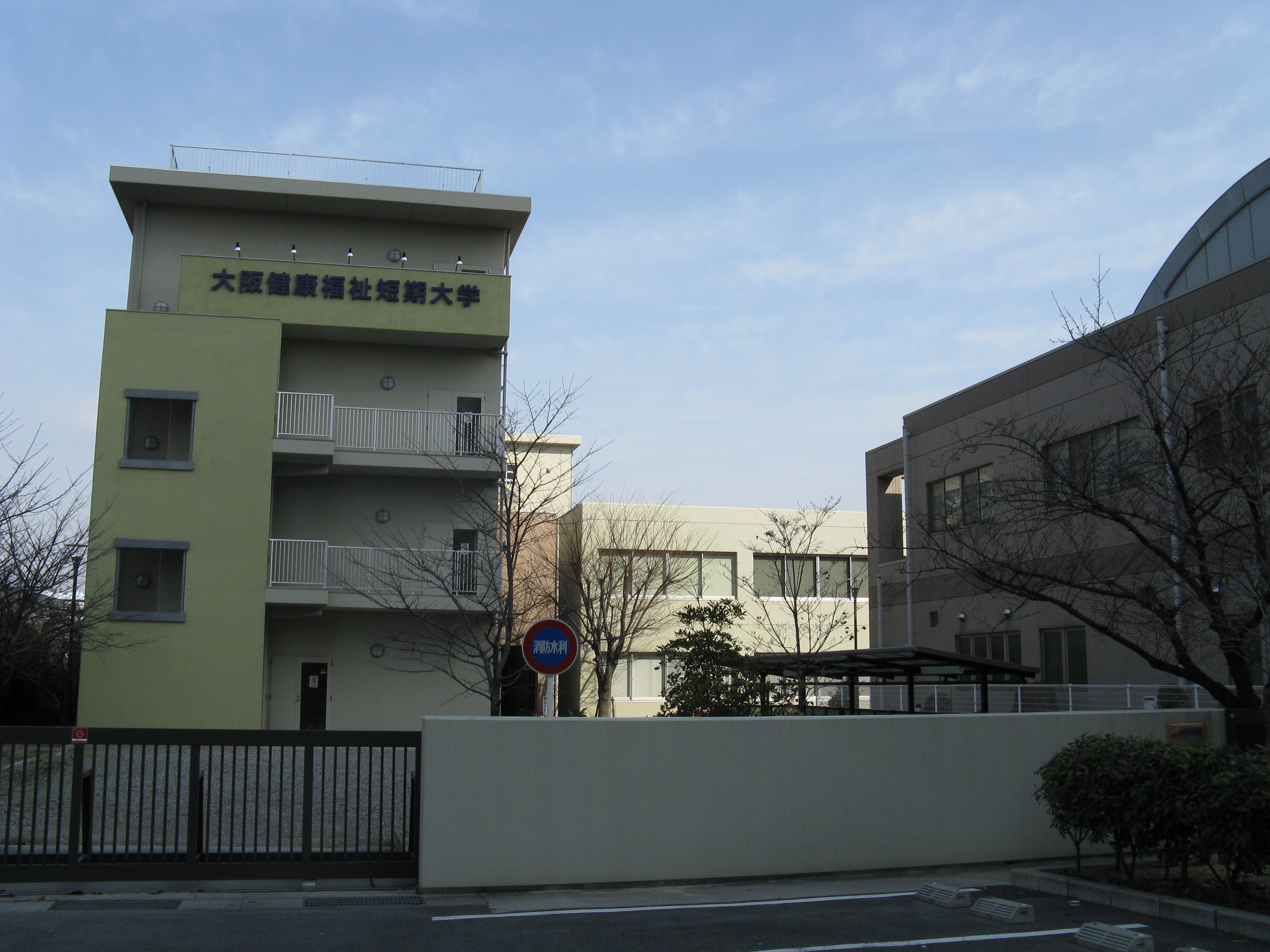
- 大阪健康福祉短期大学
- Type: Private
- Established: 2002
- President: Hidenori Akiba
- Academic staff: Human Welfare; Child Welfare
- Students: About 370
- Location: Sakai-ku, Sakai Sakai, Osaka, Osaka Prefecture, Japan
- Website: http://www.kenko-fukushi.ac.jp/ Osaka Junior College of Social Health and Welfare

Osaka Junior College of Social Health and Welfare (大阪健康福祉短期大学, Ōsaka Kenkō Fukushi Tanki Daigaku) is a junior college located in Sakai-ku, Sakai, Osaka, Osaka Prefecture, Japan. It is part of the Midori Gakuen network.

The origin of the institute was the Osaka Childcare Laboratory, established in 1979. In 1985, a professional school for childcare was founded. Later, a professional school for care work was established. In 2002, the professional school became a junior college.
