= Hiroshima Bunka Two-year College =

Coordinates: 34°25′55″N 132°26′49″E

Hiroshima Bunka Two-year College (広島文化短期大学, Hiroshima bunka tanki daigaku) is a private junior college in Hiroshima, Hiroshima, Japan. The school first opened as a women's junior college in 1964. In 1999 it became coeducational.
