= Tokyo Rissho Junior College =

Coordinates: 35°41′26.4″N 139°38′46.5″E

Tokyo Rissho Junior College (東京立正短期大学, Tōkyō risshō tanki daigaku) is a private junior college in Suginami, Tokyo, Japan. The precursor of the school was founded in 1926, and it was chartered as a university in 1966.
