= Jin-ai Women's College =

Private women's junior college in Fukui, Fukui, Japan

Coordinates: 36°6′12.4″N 136°13′3.1″E

Jin-ai Women’s College
- 仁愛女子短期大学; Jinai joshi tanki daigaku
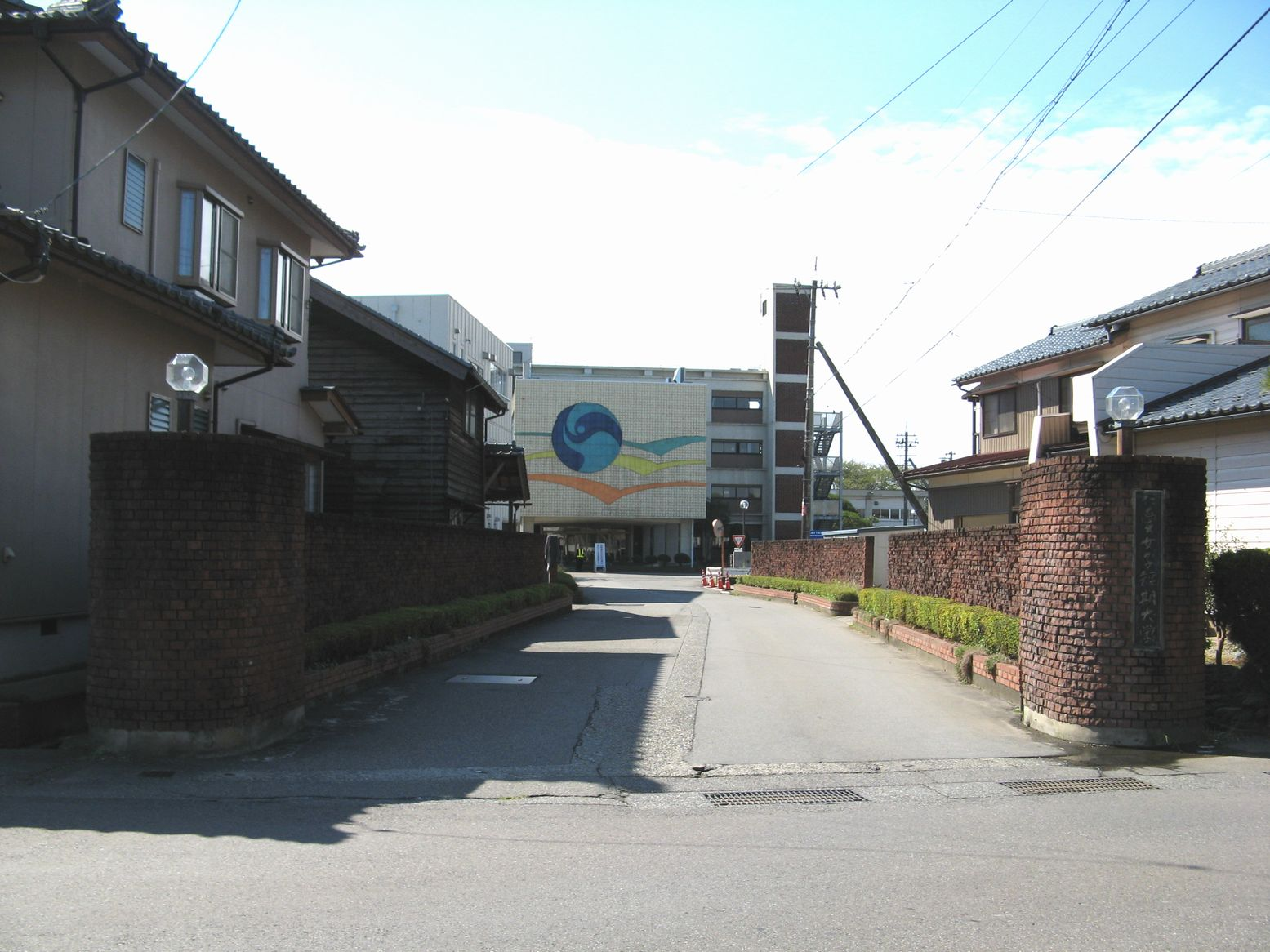
- Jin-ai Women’s College
- Type: Private
- Established: 1965
- Location: Fukui, Fukui, Japan
- Website: Official website

Jin-ai Women's College (仁愛女子短期大学, Jinai joshi tanki daigaku) is a private women's junior college in Fukui, Fukui, Japan, established in 1965.
