= Kokugakuin University Hokkaido Junior College =

Coordinates: 43°34′4.9″N 141°55′37.5″E

Kokugakuin University Hokkaido Junior College (國學院大學北海道短期大学部, Kokugakuin Daigaku Hokkaidō Tanki Daigakubu) is a private junior college in Takikawa, Hokkaido, Japan. It was first established as a junior women's college in 1982. In 1991 it became coeducational, adopting the present name at the same time.
