= Aichi Kiwami College of Nursing =

Private junior college in Ichinomiya, Japan

- 愛知きわみ看護短期大学
- Type: Private; Junior college
- Established: 2004
- Location: Ichinomiya, Aichi, Japan; 35.3167°N 136.8111°E
- Campus: Urban

Aichi Kiwami College of Nursing (愛知きわみ看護短期大学, Aichi kiwami kango tanki daigaku) is a private junior college in the city of Ichinomiya in Aichi Prefecture, Japan. It was established in 2004.
