= Mito Junior College =

Coordinates: 36°21′42.44″N 140°26′48.37″E

- 水戸短期大学
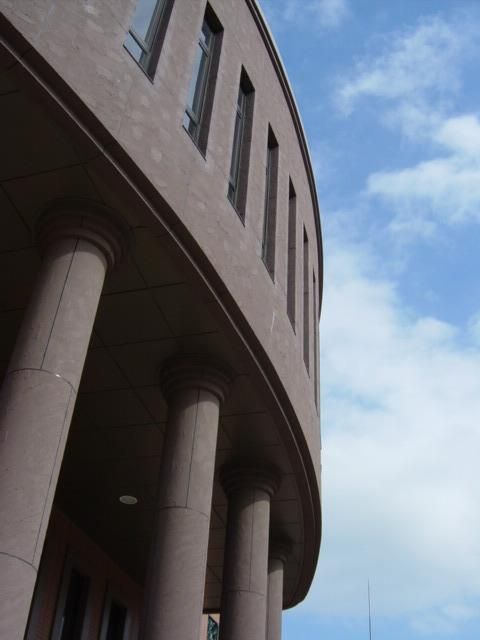
- Type: Private
- Established: 1964-2012
- Location: Mito, Ibaraki, Japan
- Website: Official website

Mito Junior College (水戸短期大学, Mito tanki daigaku) was a private junior college in Mito, Ibaraki, Japan, established in 1964. The predecessor of the school was founded in 1948.
