= Matsumoto Junior College =

Private junior college in Matsumoto, Nagano, Japan, established in 1972

Coordinates: 36°10′30.4″N 137°56′12.3″E

Matsumoto Junior College (松本短期大学, Matsumoto tanki daigaku) is a private junior college in Matsumoto, Nagano, Japan. It was established in 1972; the predecessor of the school was founded a year before. Despite the similarity in the names, this school and Matsumoto University are unrelated.
