= Okazaki Women's Junior College =

Coordinates: 34°57′18.30″N 137°11′08.16″E

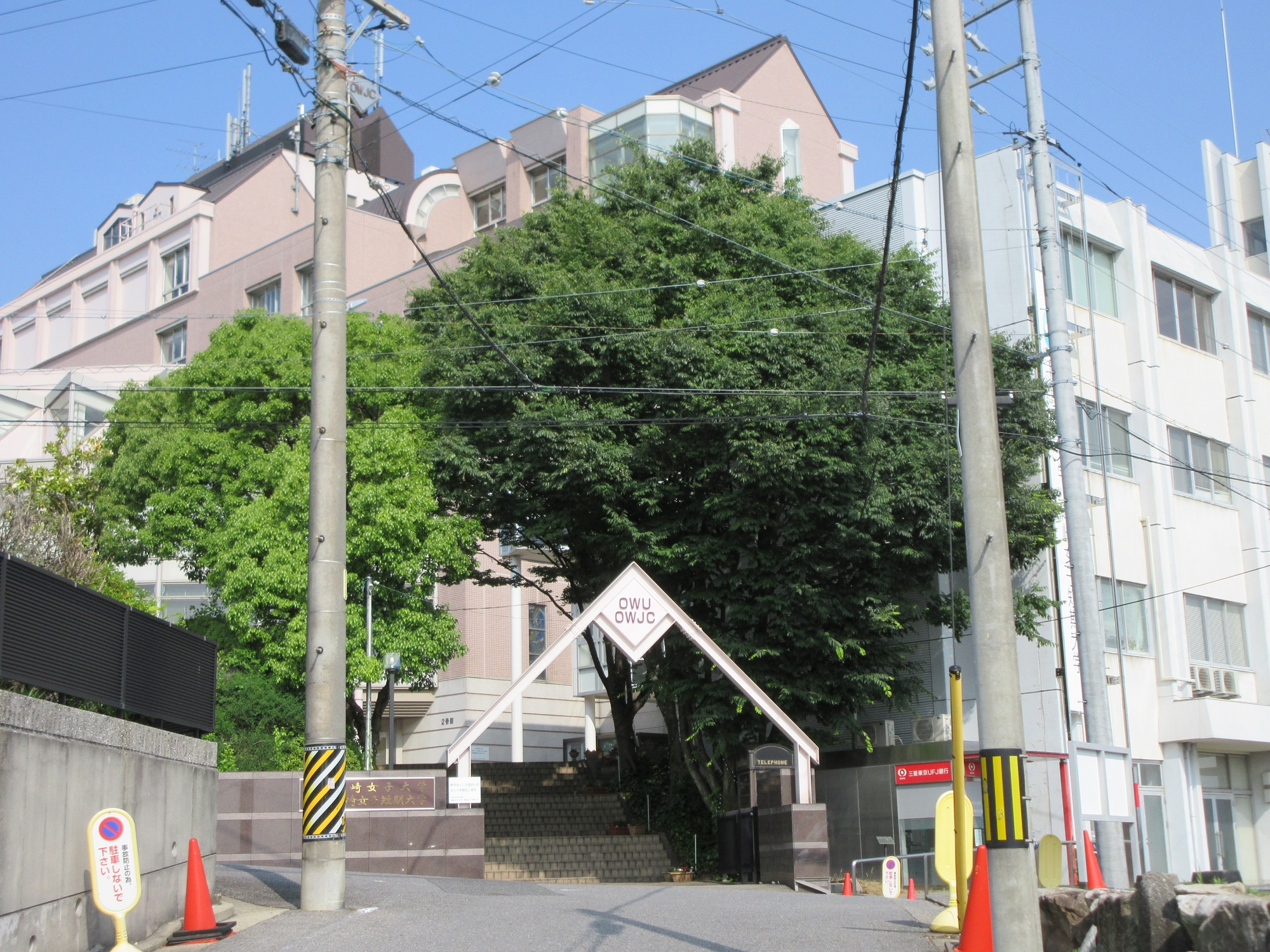
Okazaki Women's Junior College

Okazaki Women's Junior College (岡崎女子短期大学, Okazaki joshi tanki daigaku) is a private women's junior college in the city of Okazaki in Aichi Prefecture, Japan. It was established in 1965.
