= Kibi International University Junior College =

Coordinates: 34°47′47″N 133°37′14″E

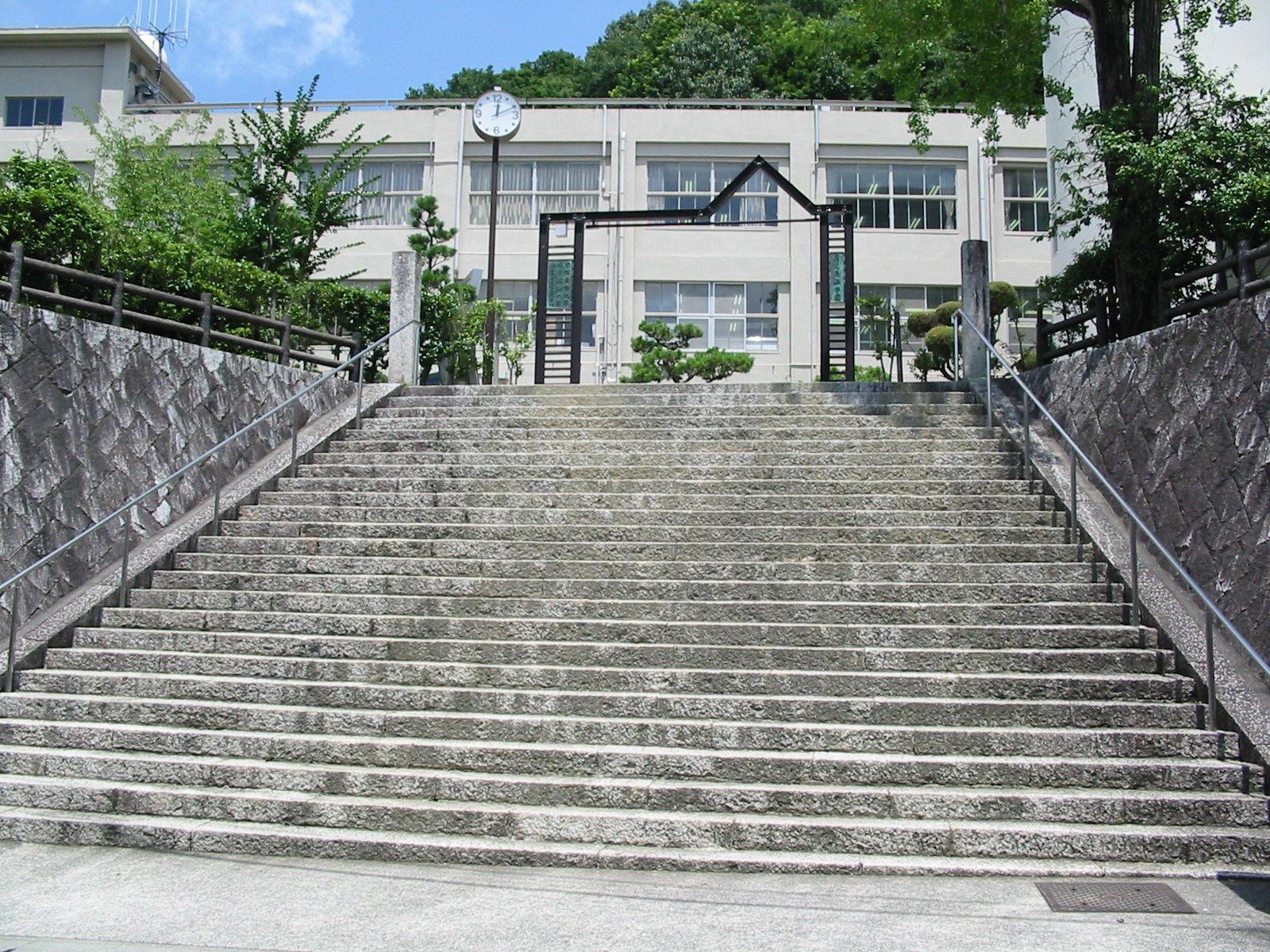
KIU Junior College

Kibi International University Junior College (吉備国際大学短期大学部, Kibi Kokusai Daigaku Tanki Daigakubu) is a private junior college in Takahashi, Okayama, Japan, established in 1967. The predecessor of the school was founded in 1966.

== See also ==
- Kibi International University
