= Kanagawa Prefectural College of Foreign Studies =

Coordinates: 35°25′18″N 139°36′12″E

- 神奈川県立外語短期大学; Kanagawa kenritsu gaigo tanki daigaku
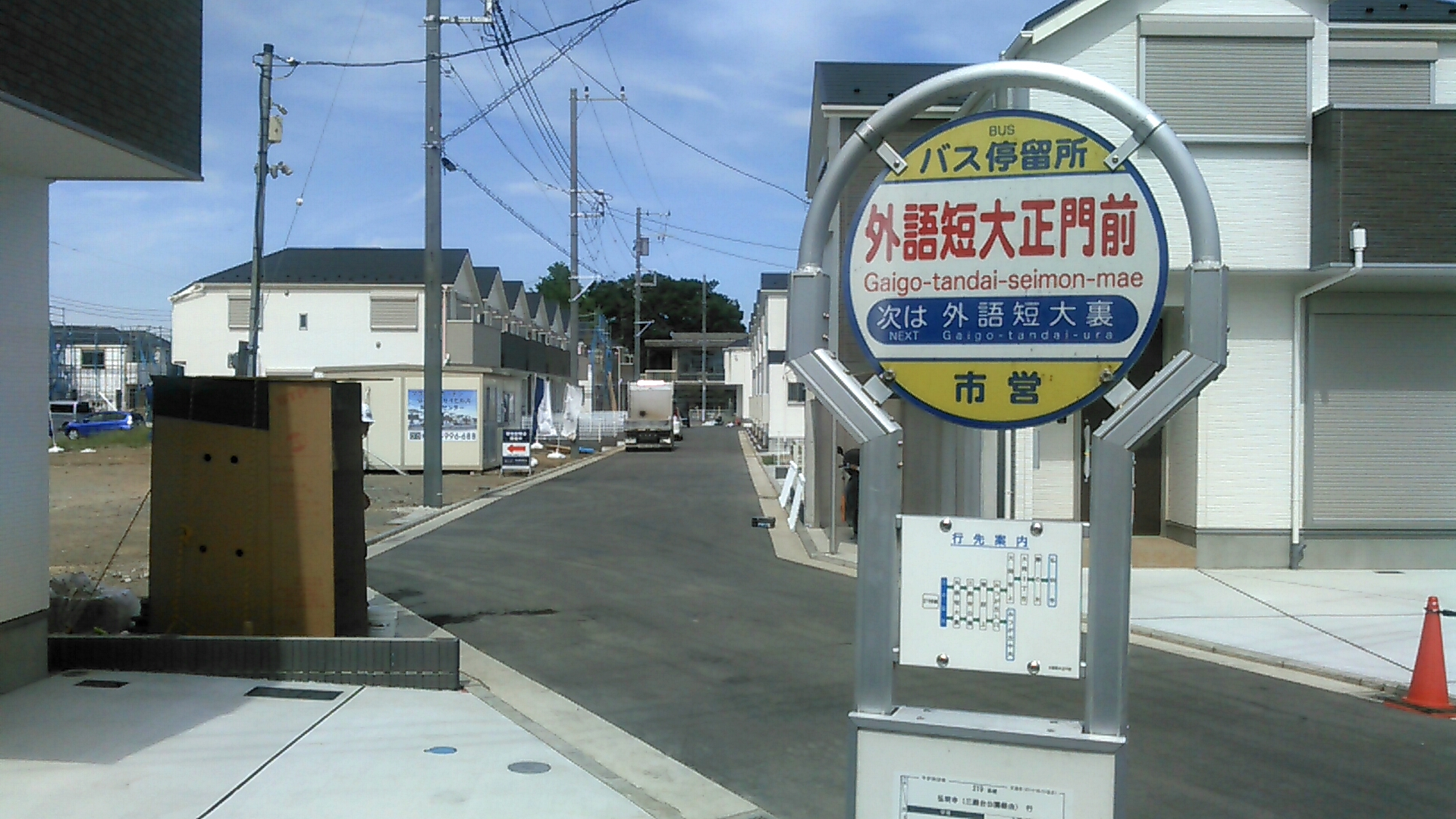
- Type: Prefectural
- Active: 1968–2011
- Location: Isogo-ku, Yokohama, Kanagawa, Japan
- Website: Official website

Kanagawa Prefectural College of Foreign Studies (神奈川県立外語短期大学, Kanagawa kenritsu gaigo tanki daigaku) was a prefectural junior college in Isogo-ku, Yokohama, Kanagawa Prefecture, Japan, established in 1968. It closed in 2011.

The school specialized in teaching English, Chinese, French and Spanish languages.
