= Nagasaki Women's Junior College =

Coordinates: 32°43′55″N 129°53′48″E

Nagasaki Women's Junior College (長崎女子短期大学, Nagasaki joshi tanki daigaku) is a private women's junior college in Nagasaki, Japan, established in 1966. The predecessor of the school was founded in 1896.
