= Narabunka Women's College =

Japanese private women's junior college (established 1965)

Coordinates: 34°43′14″N 135°44′46″E

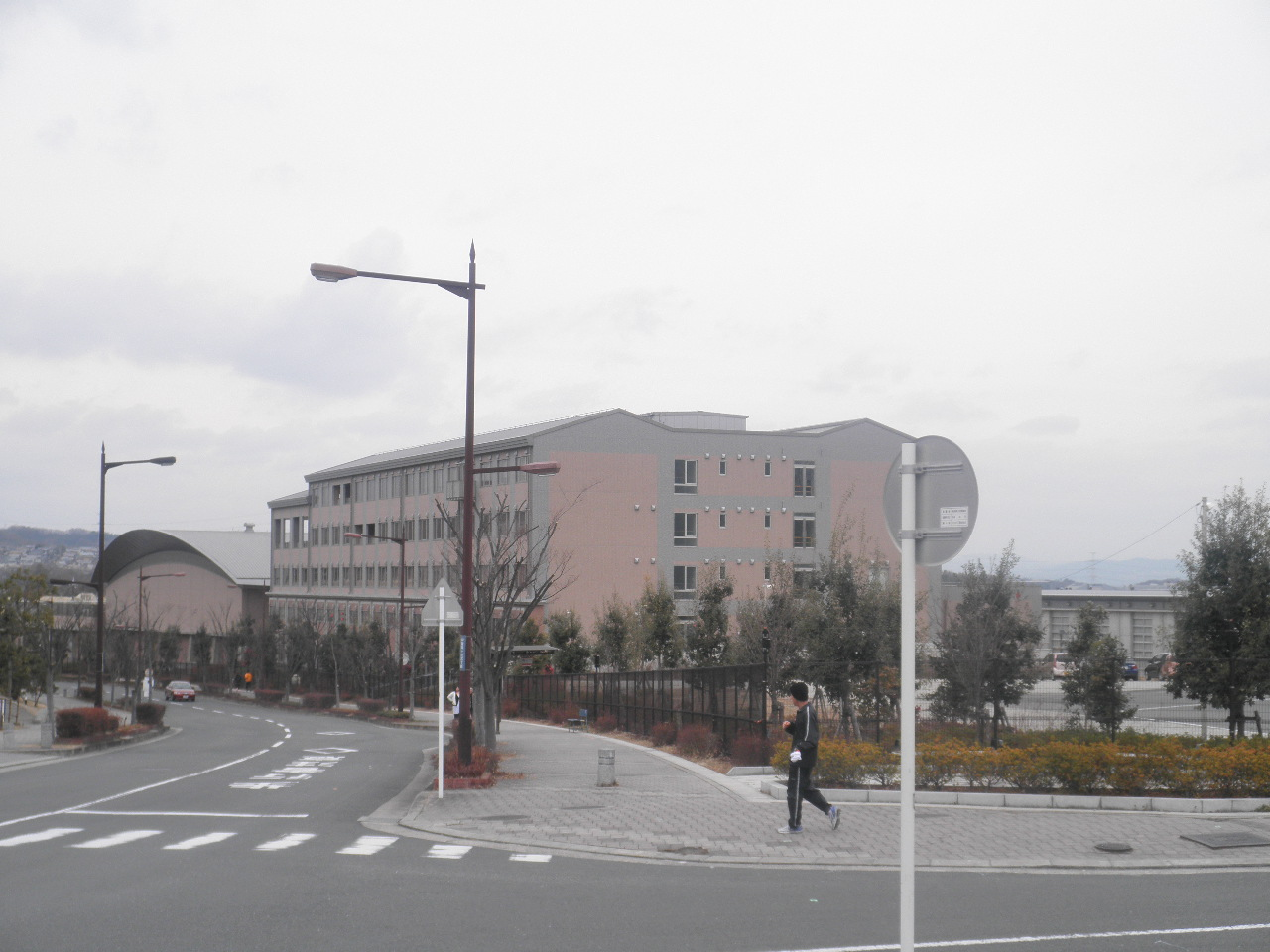
Narabunka Women's College

Narabunka Women's College (奈良文化女子短期大学, Nara bunka joshi tanki daigaku) is a private women's junior college in the city of Nara in Nara Prefecture, Japan. It was established in 1965.
