= Teikyo Heisei Nursing Junior College =

Private junior college in Japan

Coordinates: 35°36′53.72″N 140°05′38.90″E

Teikyō Heisei Nursing Junior College
- 帝京平成看護短期大学; Teikyō heisei kango tanki daigaku
- Type: Private
- Active: 1990–2016; 10 years ago
- Location: Ichihara, Chiba, Japan
- Website: Official website

Teikyō Heisei Nursing Junior College (帝京平成看護短期大学, Teikyō heisei kango tanki daigaku) was a private junior college in the city of Ichihara in Chiba Prefecture, Japan. Established in 1990, the school was operated by Teikyo Group, a foundation that operates more than 30 schools (including colleges) across Japan. The college closed in 2016.
