= Seiryo Women's Junior College =

Women's College in Japan

Coordinates: 36°35′2.1″N 136°40′53.5″E

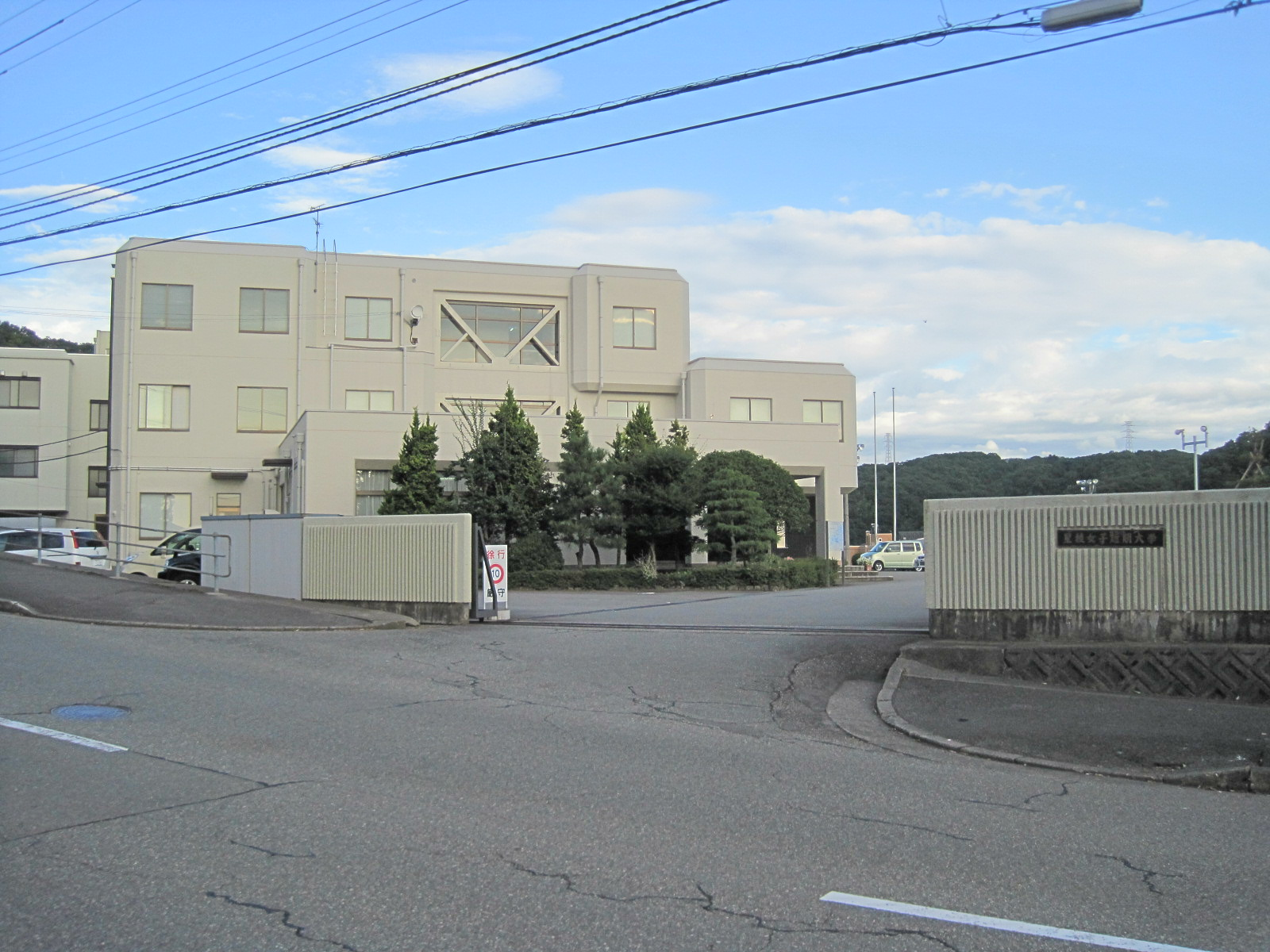
Seiryo Women's Junior College

Seiryo Women's Junior College (星稜女子短期大学, Seiryō joshi tanki daigaku) is a private women's junior college in Kanazawa, Ishikawa, Japan, established in 1979.
