= Shimonoseki Junior College =

College in Japan

Coordinates: 33°57′45″N 130°55′23″E

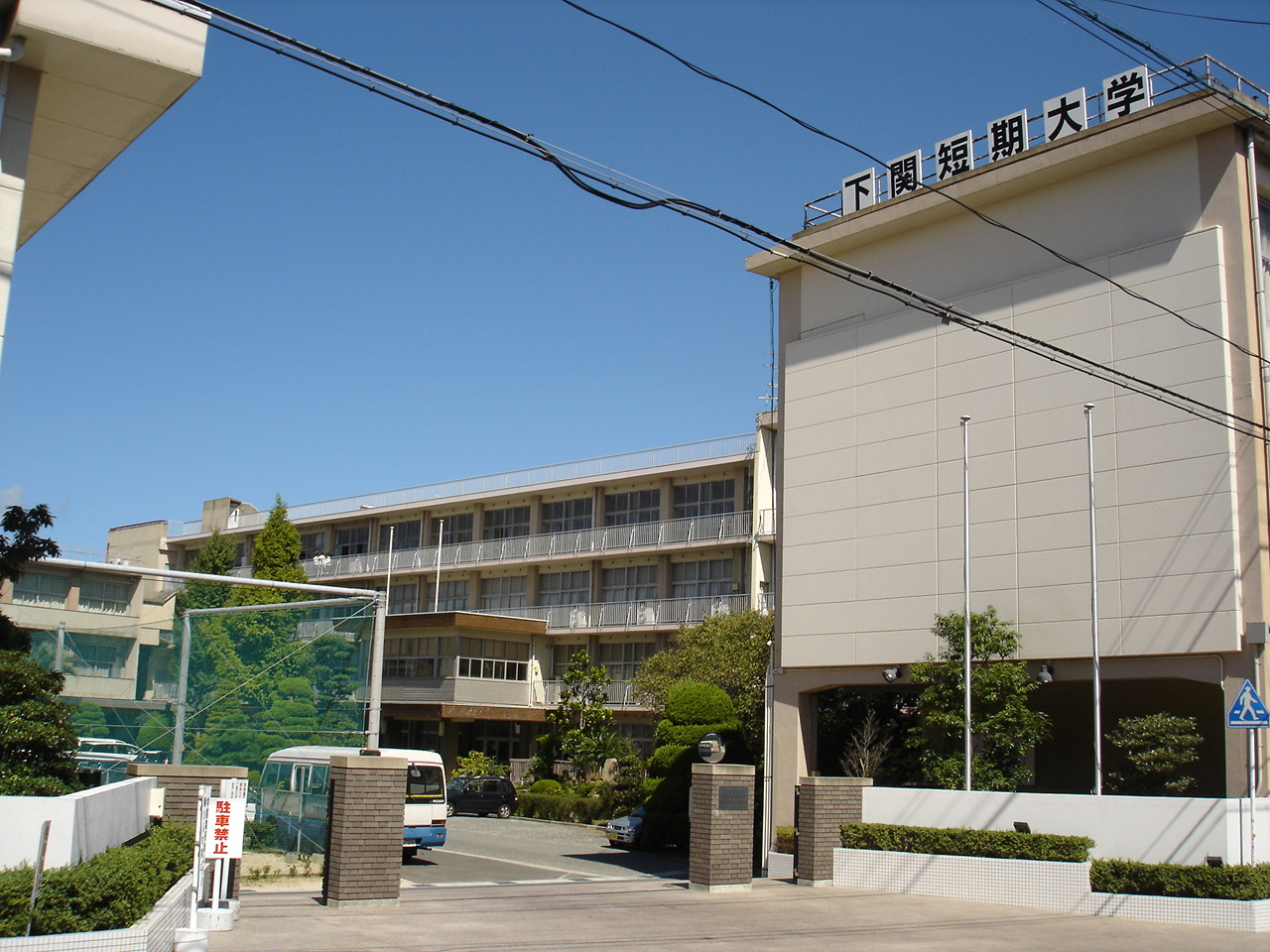
Shimonoseki Junior College

Shimonoseki Junior College (下関短期大学, Shimonoseki tanki daigaku) is a private junior college in Shimonoseki, Yamaguchi, Japan. The school opened in 1962 as a women's junior college with enrollment of 32 students. In 2001 it became coeducational, adopting the present name at the same time.
