= Takayama College of Car Technology =

Coordinates: 36°8′51.5″N 137°14′5.9″E

- 高山自動車短期大学
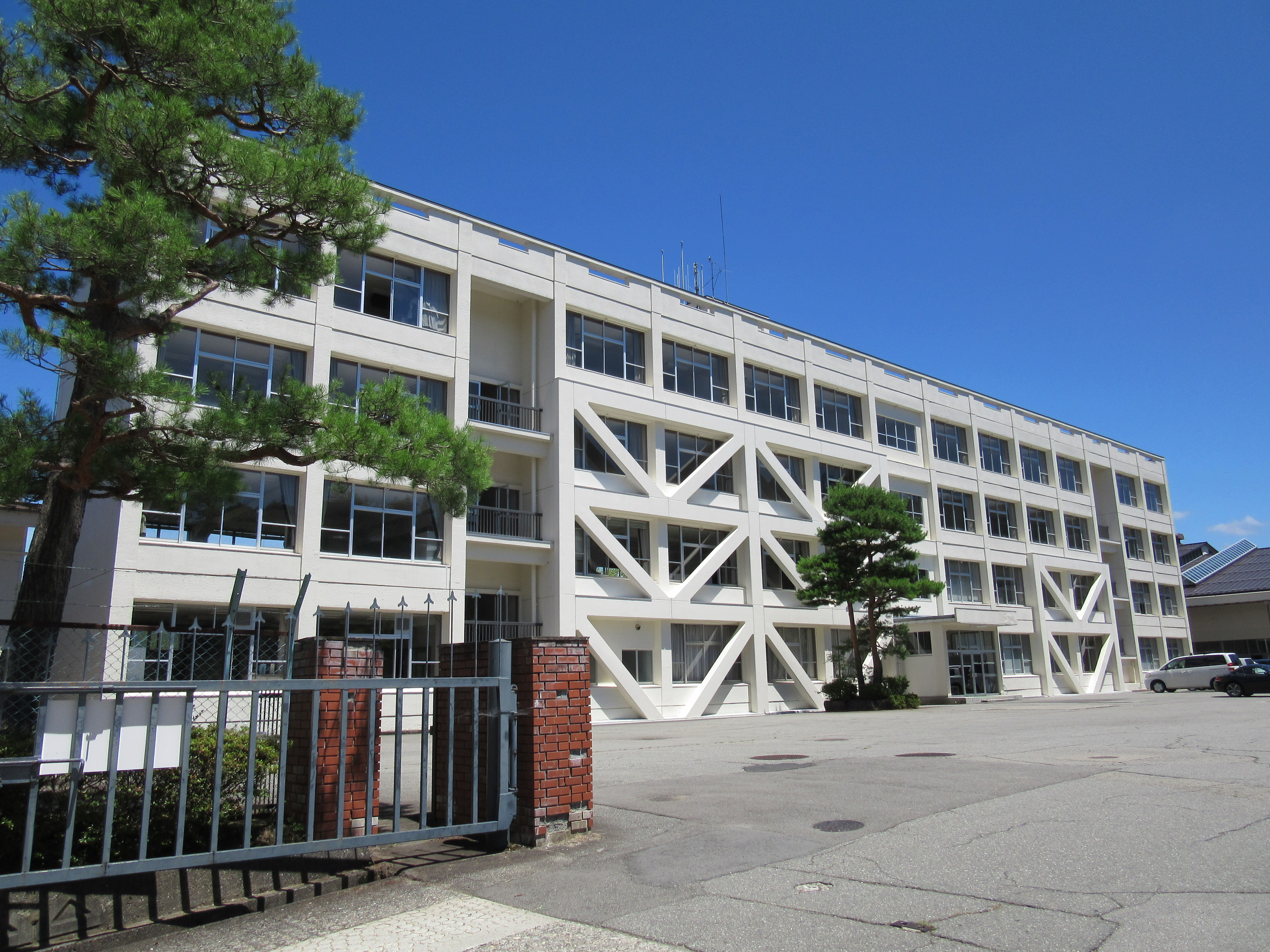
- Takayama College of Car Technology
- Type: Private
- Location: Takayama, Gifu, Japan
- Website: http://www.takayamacollege.ac.jp/

Takayama College of Car Technology (高山自動車短期大学, Takayama jidōsha tanki daigaku) is a private junior college in Takayama, Gifu, Japan, established in 1961.
