= Tokiwa Junior College =

Coordinates: 36°22′54.5″N 140°26′21.8″E

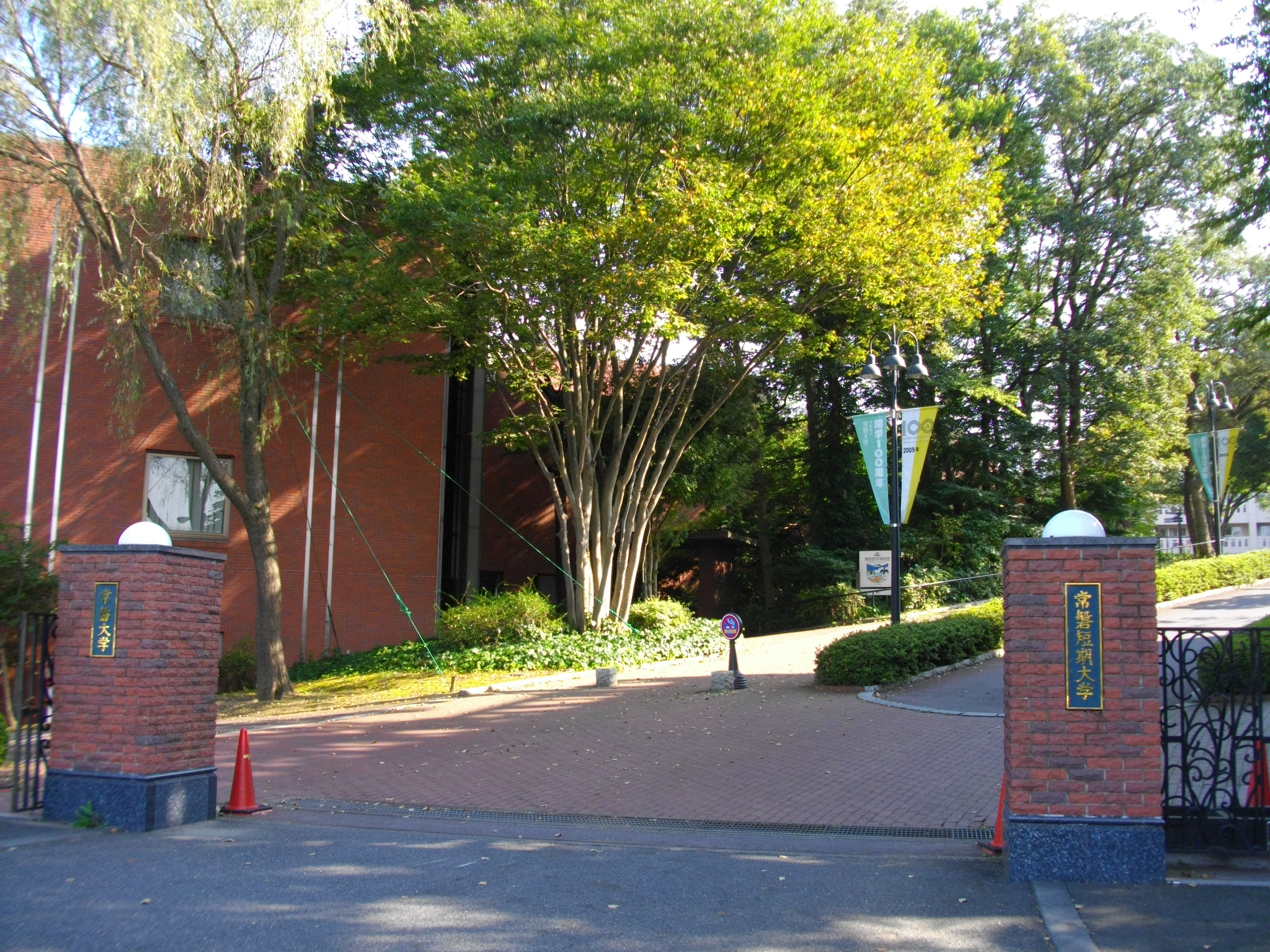
Tokiwa University

Tokiwa Junior College (常磐短期大学, Tokiwa tanki daigaku) is located in Mito City, Ibaraki Prefecture, Japan and was established in 1966 as Tokiwagakuen Junior College.
