= Niigata College of Technology =

Japanese college

Coordinates: 37°52′55.5″N 138°57′44″E

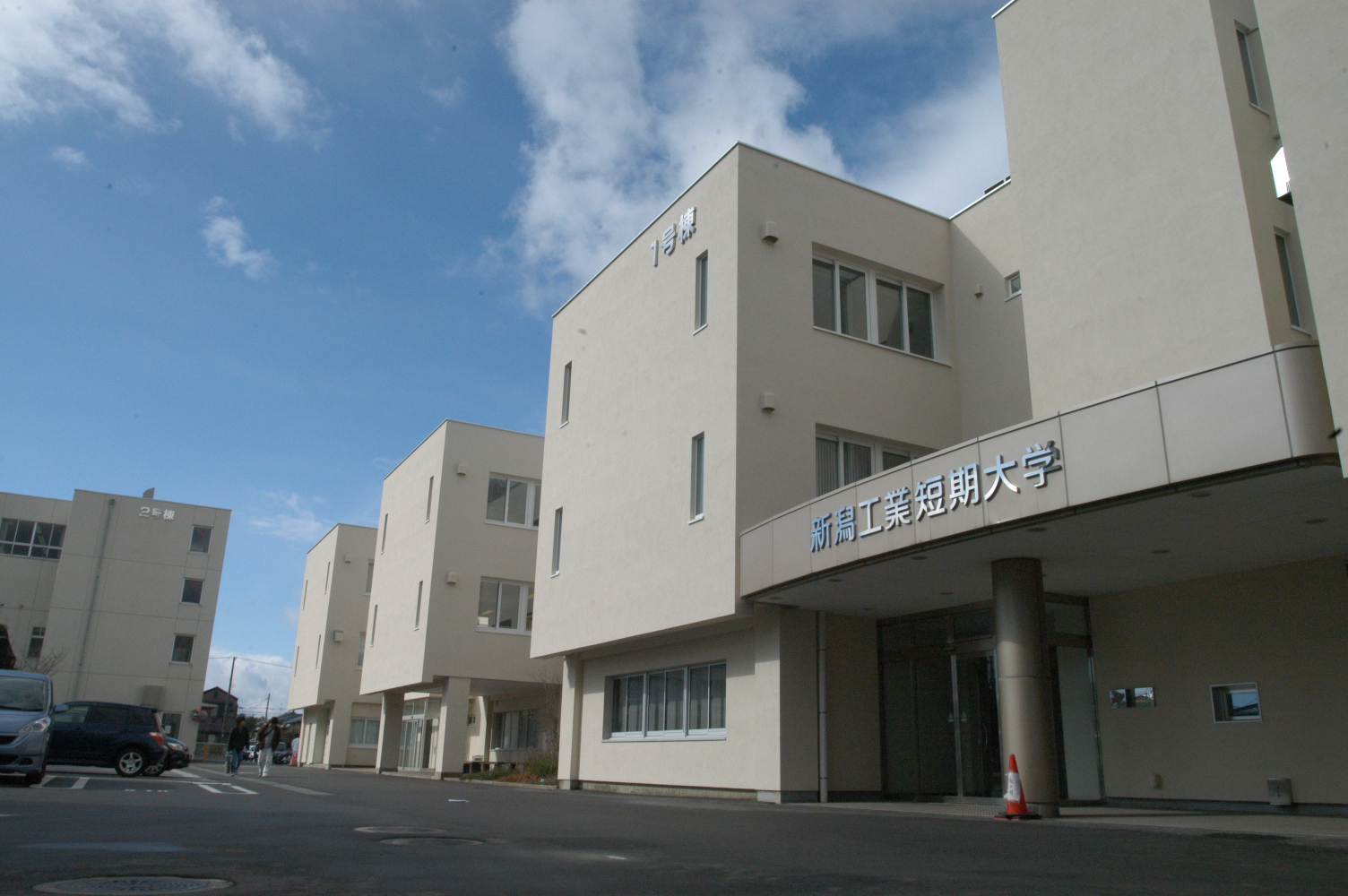
Niigata College of Technology

Niigata College of Technology (新潟工業短期大学, Niigata kōgyō tanki daigaku) is a private junior college in Niigata, Niigata, Japan, established in 1968.
