= Sakai Women's Junior College =

Coordinates: 34°35′3.1″N 135°29′50.8″E

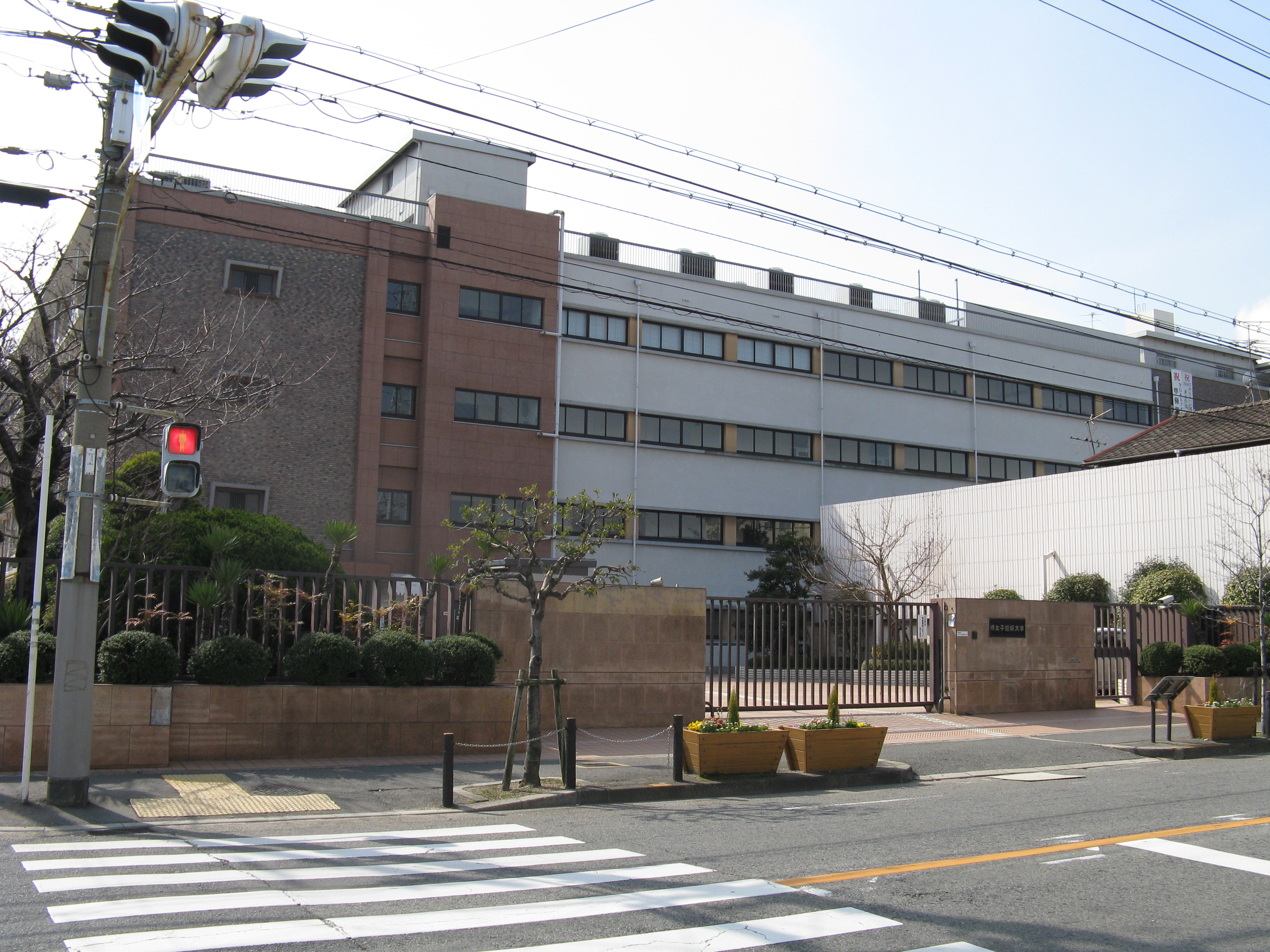
Sakai Women's Junior College

Sakai Women's Junior College (堺女子短期大学, Sakai joshi tanki daigaku) is a private women's junior college in Sakai, Osaka, Japan. The precursor of the school was founded in 1922, and it was chartered as a university in 1965.
