= Osaka Jonan Women's Junior College =

- 大阪城南女子短期大学
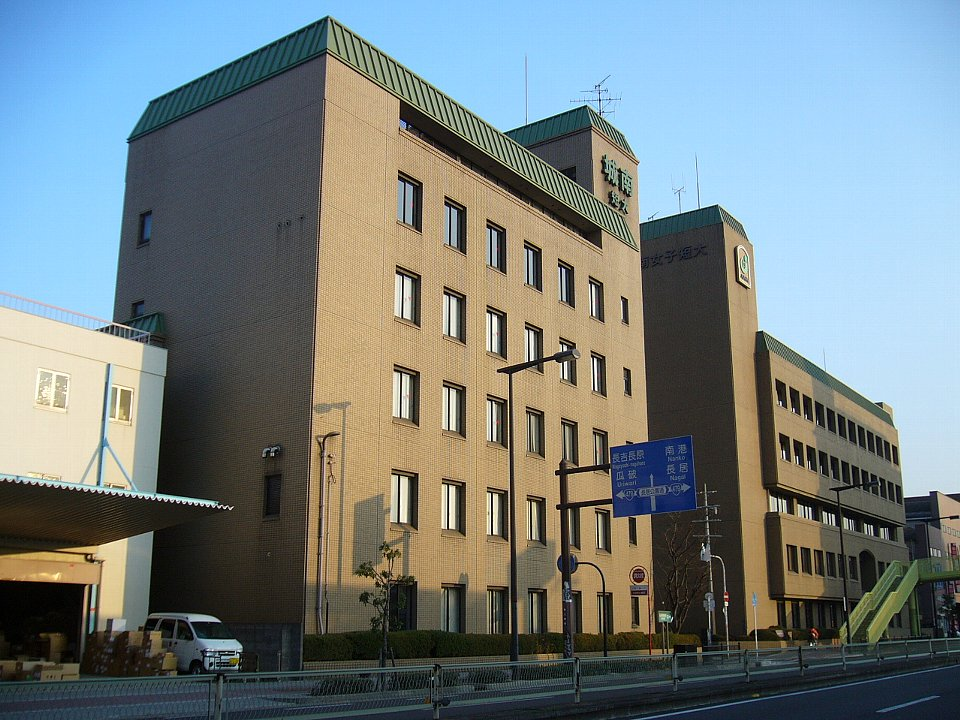
- Main building
- Type: Private
- Established: 1965
- Parent institution: Jonan Gakuen
- Location: Sumiyoshi-ku, Osaka, Japan; 34°36′38″N 135°32′20.2″E
- Website: tandai.jonan.jp

Osaka Jonan Women's Junior College (大阪城南女子短期大学, Ōsaka jōnan joshi tanki daigaku) is a private women's junior college in Osaka, Osaka Prefecture, Japan, established in 1965. The predecessor of the school was founded in 1935.
