= Kyoto Junior College =

Kyoto Junior College (京都短期大学, Kyōtō tanki daigaku) was a private junior college in Fukuchi, Kyoto, Japan, established in 1950. The predecessor of the school was founded in 1941. The present name was adopted in 1956. Discontinued in 2017.
