= Toyoko Gakuen Women's College =

College in Tokyo, Japan

Toyoko Gakuen Women's College (東横学園女子短期大学, Tōyoko gakuen joshi tanki daigaku) was a private women's junior college in Setagaya, Tokyo, Japan. The precursor of the school was founded in 1938, and it was chartered as a junior college in 1956.

This junior college and Musashi Institute of Technology (武蔵工業大学, Musashi kōgyō daigaku) were reorganized into Tokyo City University in 2009.
