= The Nippon Dental University =

Private university in Japan

Coordinates: 37°54′38.7″N 139°0′37.2″E

- 日本歯科大学
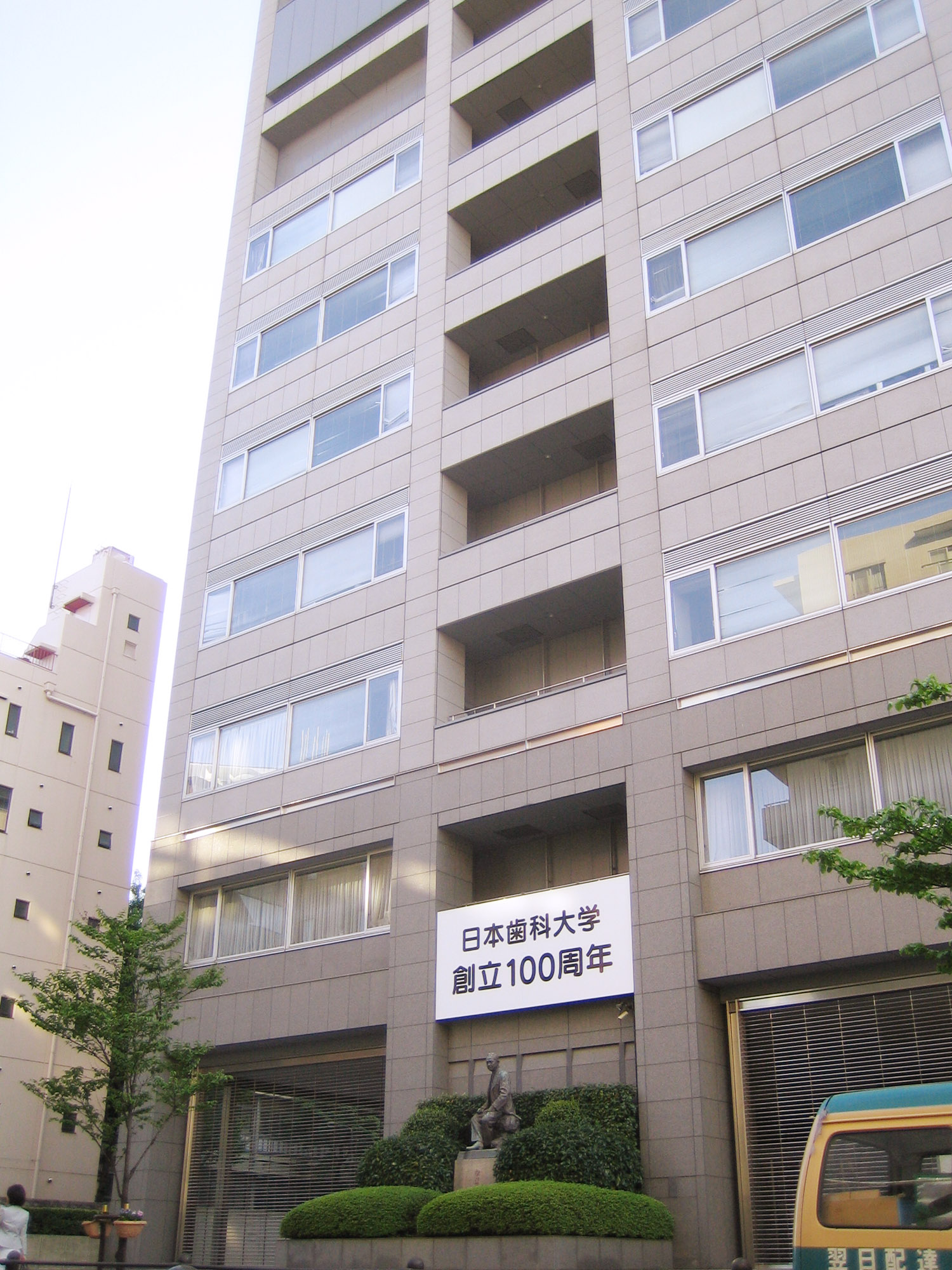
- Type: Private
- Established: 1947
- Location: Chiyoda, Tokyo and Chūō-ku, Niigata, Japan
- Website: http://www.ndu.ac.jp/

The Nippon Dental University (日本歯科大学, Nippon shika daigaku) is a private university in Tokyo and Niigata, Japan, established in 1947.

== History ==
The predecessor of the school was founded in 1907. One out of every seven dentists in Japan is a graduate of this school.

== Scandal ==
The university attracted international opprobrium in 2006 when its museum of medicine and dentistry declined to return a copy of Andreas Vesalius's De Humani Corporis Fabrica (1552), stolen from the library of Christ Church, University of Oxford in 1995. The book was one of 74 books stolen from the library, 73 of which were subsequently recovered, with the full cooperation of libraries and dealers all over the world.

http://www.timeshighereducation.co.uk/features/law-is-not-on-our-side-but-honour-is-we-wont-give-up/203097.article
