= Meirin College =

Coordinates: 37°53′38.2″N 138°58′57″E

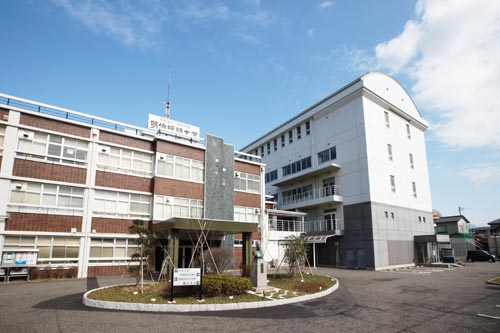
Meirin College

Meirin College (明倫短期大学, Meirin tanki daigaku) is a private junior college in Niigata, Niigata, Japan, established in 1997.
