= Nagano College of Economics =

Nagano College of Economics (長野経済短期大学, Nagano keizai tanki daigaku) was a private junior college in Nagano, Nagano, Japan, established in 1967. It closed down in 2009.
