= Setouchi Junior College =

Coordinates: 34.1813°N 133.7147°E

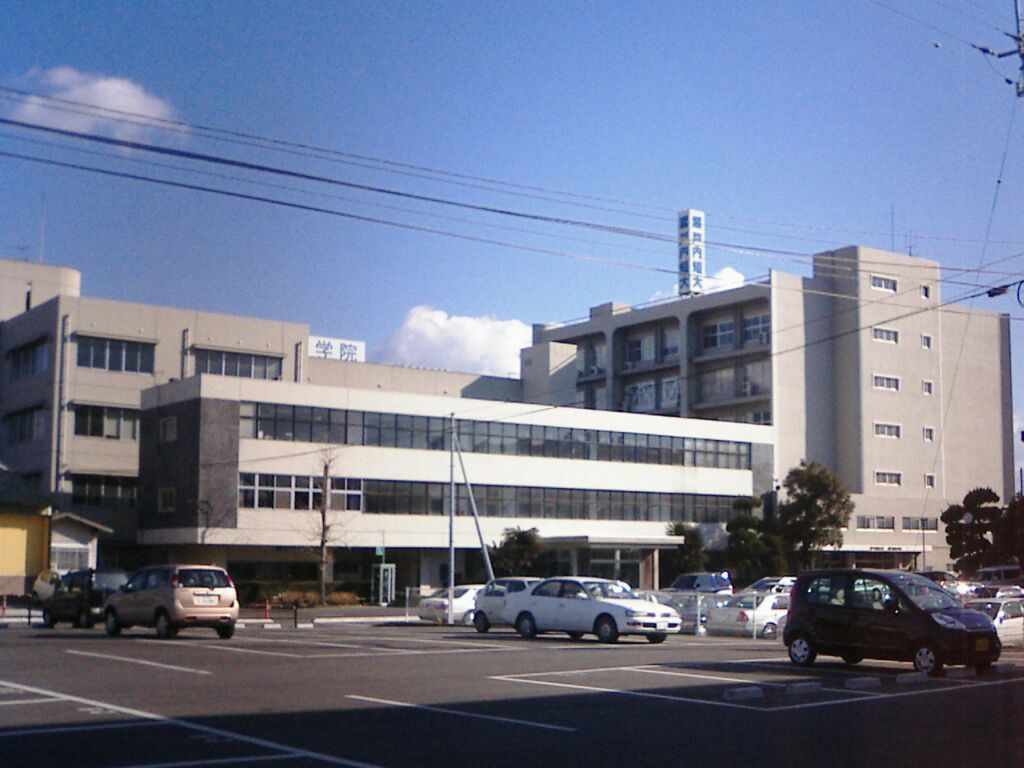
Setouchi Junior College

Setouchi Junior College (瀬戸内短期大学, Setouchi tanki daigaku) is a private junior college in Mitoyo, Kagawa, Japan. Originally established as a women's junior college in 1967, it became coeducational in 1987. In 2007 the school was selected for Good Practice, a funding program by the Ministry of Education.
