= Nara Saho College =

Coordinates: 34°39′50″N 135°50′40″E

- 奈良佐保短期大学
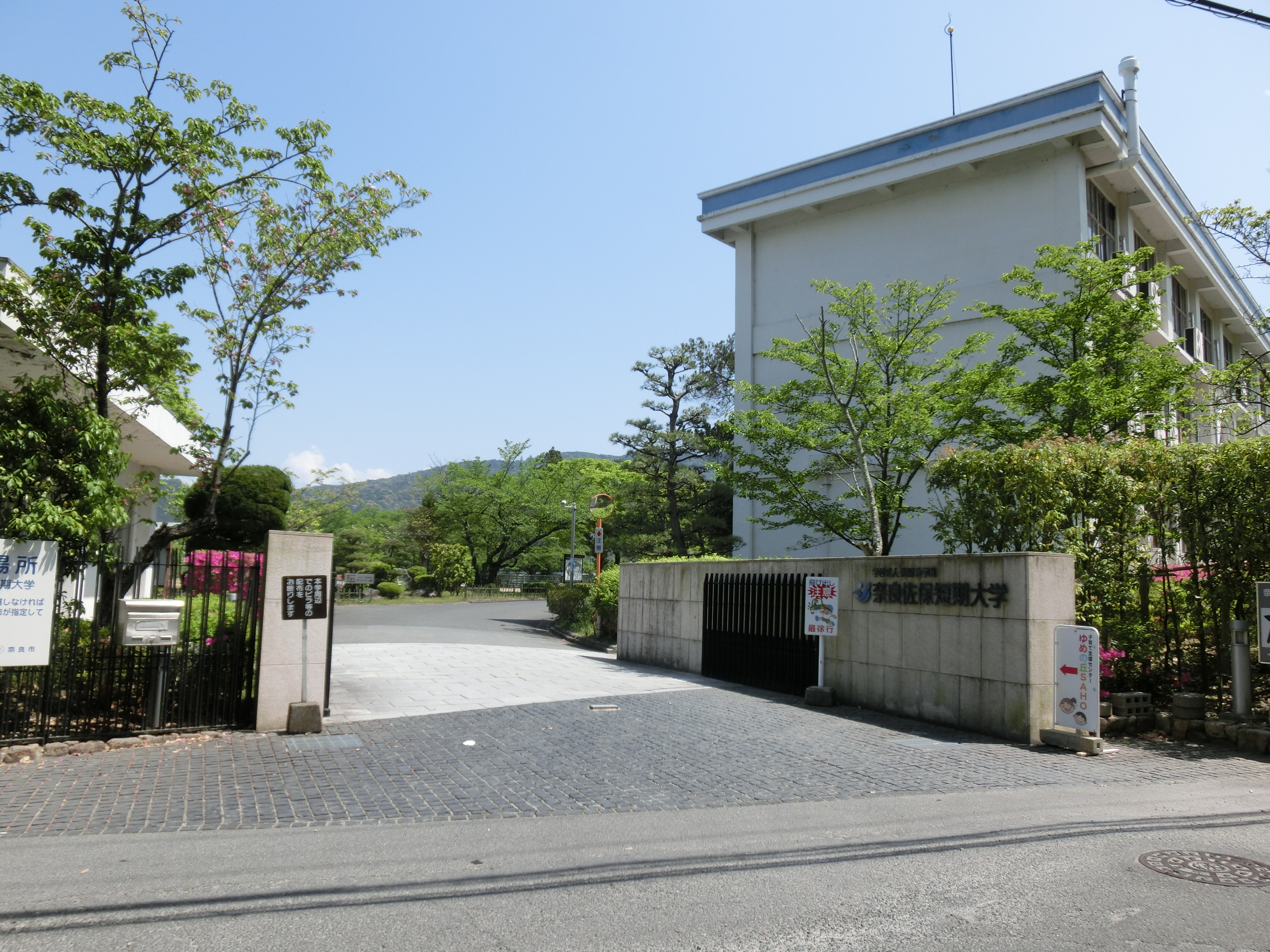
- Type: Private junior college
- Established: 1965
- Location: Nara, Nara, Japan

Nara Saho College (奈良佐保短期大学, Nara Saho Tanki Daigaku) is a private junior college in the city of Nara in Nara Prefecture, Japan. The predecessor of the school, founded in 1931, was chartered as a women's junior college in 1965. In 2001 it became coeducational, adopting the present name at the same time.

== See also ==
- Nara Women's University
