= Shoei Junior College =

Coordinates: 34°43′38.7″N 135°14′56.9″E

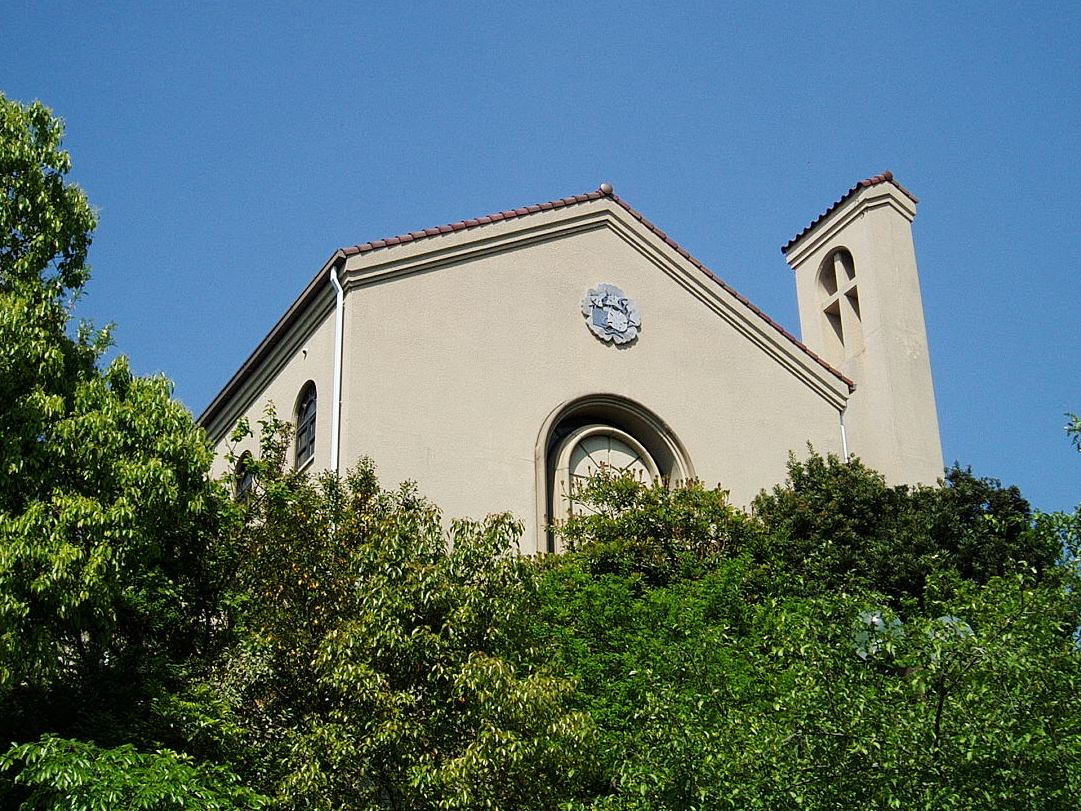
Howe Memorial Hall, which commemorates Annie L. Howe, the founder of the school.

Shoei Junior College (頌栄短期大学, Shōei tanki daigaku) is a private junior college in Kobe, Hyōgo, Japan, established in 1950. The predecessor of the school was founded in 1889.
