= The Nippon Dental University College at Tokyo =

Junior college in Tokyo, Japan

Coordinates: 35°42′0.5″N 139°44′41.5″E

- 日本歯科大学東京短期大学
- Former names: Professional School (1968-2005)
- Type: Junior college
- Established: 2005 (as junior college); 1968 (as professional school)
- Parent institution: The Nippon Dental University
- Location: Tokyo, Japan
- Language: Japanese

The Nippon Dental University College at Tokyo (日本歯科大学東京短期大学, Nihon Shika Daigaku Tōkyō Tanki Daigaku) is a junior college in Tokyo, Japan.

The institute was founded in 1968 as a professional school, and became a junior college in 2005.
