= Shoinhigashi Women's Junior College =

Coordinates: 34°39′25.7″N 135°35′48.6″E

Shoin-Higashi Women's Junior College (樟蔭東女子短期大学, Shōin higashi joshi tanki daigaku) was a private women's junior college in Osaka, Osaka, Japan. The institution's predecessor was founded in 1937, and it was chartered as a university in 1966. The college closed in 2015
