= Seund Ja Rhee =

South Korean painter, engraver, draughtswoman, and illustrator (1918–2009)

- Born: June 3, 1918
- Died: March 8, 2009 (aged 90)
- Education: Jinju Girls' High School; Jissen Women's University; Académie de la Grande Chaumière
- Occupations: Painter, printmaker, ceramist

Korean name
- Hangul: 이성자
- Hanja: 李聖子
- RR: I Seongja
- MR: I Sŏngja
- Website: seundjarhee.com

Seund Ja Rhee (also transcribed as Seongja Lee; June 3, 1918 – March 8, 2009) was a South Korean painter, engraver, draughtswoman, and illustrator. She also designed tapestries and mosaics. She was a prolific artist with more than 1,000 paintings, 700 prints, 250 ceramics, and numerous drawings. She exhibited mainly in France and in South Korea, with 84 solo exhibitions and almost 300 group exhibitions during her lifetime. In 1958, she moved to Tourrettes-sur-Loup, French Riviera (France) where she finally built the "Milky Way", a large atelier and exhibition room.

== Biography ==
Born in Jinju, Keishōnan-dō, Korea, Empire of Japan, Rhee studied in Jinju Girls' High School before moving to Japan to attend Jissen Women's University in Tokyo in 1938. In 1938, she returned home and married. In 1951, she was separated from her three sons by the Korean War. In the same year, she left for Paris, where she entered the Académie de la Grande Chaumière in 1953 to study under Yves Brayer and Henri Goetz. Rhee started to develop an interest in woodcuts and engraving while visiting Stanley William Hayter's "Atelier 17." In 1958, she moved to Tourrettes sur Loup, French Riviera, where she used a stone shepherd's cottage for her atelier. In 1996, she built the "Milky Way", a larger atelier, in the Korean style.

In 1991, Rhee was appointed the Chevalier of the Ordre des Arts et des Lettres in France. The Seundja Rhee Foundation was established in 2009 in Korea to preserve and promote her art.

== Artwork and exhibitions ==
Rhee's style is primarily decorative abstraction, utilizing geometric patterns and discreet colors. She was known to incorporate Korean symbols and script in her artworks. It has also been argued that, starting from the 1950s, her style changed both formally and conceptually: not only “her bold and expressionistic brushwork began to dismantle into tiny strokes, forming color planes,” but feminist allusions started to emerge, leading to a work that “was chiefly about experiences distinctive to women.” Her work has been featured in various collective exhibitions in museums and galleries, including Salon de la Société Nationale des Beaux-Arts, Paris (1956), the International Biennale of Ljubljana (1963, 1965, 1967), the Geneva Museum of Art and History (1965), and the International Biennale of Engravings in Buenos Aires (1968, 1970, 1972). Rhee's solo exhibitions have appeared in both European and Asian art institutions.

== Tributes ==
On 3 June 2016, Google celebrated Rhee Seund Ja’s 98th birthday with a doodle.
