= The Woman Knight of Mirror Lake =

2011 Chinese-Hong Kong film by Herman Yau

- Chinese film poster
- Directed by: Herman Yau
- Written by: Erica Li
- Produced by: Checkley Sin; Cherry Law
- Starring: Huang Yi; Kevin Cheng; Pat Ha; Dennis To; Anthony Wong; Lam Suet
- Cinematography: Joe Chan; Mandy Ngai
- Edited by: Azrael Chung
- Music by: Mak Chun Hung
- Production companies: National Arts Films Production; Roc Pictures
- Distributed by: Mei Ah Entertainment
- Release date: 13 October 2011
- Running time: 115 minutes
- Countries: China; Hong Kong
- Language: Mandarin

The Woman Knight of Mirror Lake (Chinese: 竞雄女侠·秋瑾) is a 2011 biographical film about Chinese feminist revolutionary Qiu Jin, directed by Herman Yau and starring Huang Yi. The film is a Chinese-Hong Kong co-production.

== Plot ==
The film tells the story of Qiu Jin and her involvement in revolutionary uprisings against the Qing Dynasty in Anhui province. Influences on her life are shown through a series of flashbacks. As a child, Qiu Jin resisted having her feet bound according to common practice, and instead pursued her interests to learn horse riding, martial arts and literature with her father and brother. Through her poetry, she expresses her sorrow at the weak state of the nation and the repression of women. Finding other like minded women in Beijing and then travelling to Japan to study reinforces her view that nationalist action is required to reform China.

Returning to China, Qiu Jin takes the position as Xu Xilin's lieutenant, assisting with the training of revolutionaries at the Datong school and plotting the revolution. Xu Xilin is later captured while executing the assassination of the governor, and Qiu Jin is captured when government forces storm the Datong school. Qiu Jin is tortured in an attempt to reveal other conspirators and she is later executed.

== Cast ==
- Huang Yi as Qiu Jin
- Kevin Cheng
- Pat Ha
- Dennis To as Xu Xilin
- Anthony Wong
- Lam Suet
- Hung Yan-yan
