= Utako Shimoda =

Japanese educator and poet (1854 – 1936)

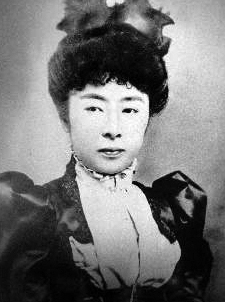
Utako Shimoda

Utako Shimoda (下田 歌子, Shimoda Utako; September 30, 1854 – October 8, 1936) was a Japanese educator and poet of the Meiji and Taishō period. Born in present-day Ena, Gifu, she was the founder many educational organizations, including what is today Jissen Women's University. She had international influence, and was one of the most influential women in Asia.

== Biography ==
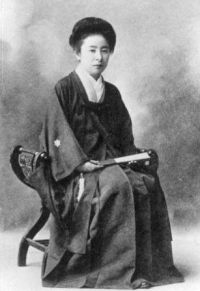
Shimoda Utako in hifu and hakama; she was also an advocate for dress reform.

Utako Shimoda was born into a samurai family as Seki Hirao, in Iwamura, in Gifu Prefecture. For the first 6–7 years of her life she was an only child, and studied the Confucian classics; she is said to have read all the Chinese and Japanese books her parents had. Her father and grandfather were Confucian scholars. In the run up to the Meiji Restoration, the Hirao family were firmly on the side of the Emperor, and when the Shogunate fell, Utako's father was given a prominent position in Tokyo, where the family moved in 1870, when Utako Shimoda was about 16.

She worked as lady-in-waiting to Empress Shōken from 1871-1879. Seki was well-educated and recognised as an excellent poet, so much so that the empress changed her name to Utako (poem child). As a result, she rose through the ranks. At court, she attended lessons and lectures, including learning French. In 1875, she began working on the empress's educational works. She formed connections to political leaders including Itō Hirobumi, Yamagata Aritomo, and Inoue Kaoru.

In November 1879, she resigned from court to marry the swordsman Takeo Shimoda, at her family's request. He suffered from alcoholism and a serious stomach ailment, and she spent much of her time caring for him. Motivated by the urgings of her connections at court, who requested a school for their daughters, and by financial need, in 1881 Utako was opened her house as a private school for girls over 10 years old. She taught poetry and Chinese classics to the wives of a number of ex-samurai officials. She would interrupt a lecture to tend to her husband when he called her.

In 1883, the empress decided to found a school for educating girls of the nobility, the Kazoku Jogakkō (later merged with the Gakushūin). Utako initially did not participate on grounds of her huband's health. Takeo died in 1884 and Utako threw herself into her work as a full-time educator, becoming a teacher and assistant principal at the Girl Peers' School, where she taught ethics and home economics. She also wrote textbooks, starting with a Japanese language textbook published in 1885.

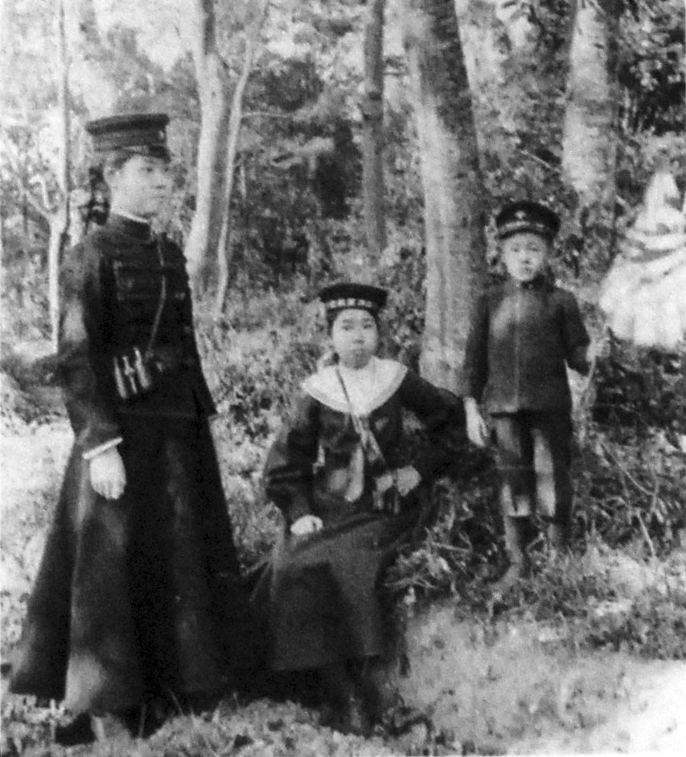
Kanemiya (left) and Tsunemiya (right), wearing army and navy uniforms respectively.

In 1893 and 1894 she went abroad to study noblewomen's education. Her interest in women's education took her to Europe (where she enjoyed an audience with Queen Victoria) and America for two years, returning to Japan in 1895 with fluent English and a raft of new ideas to overhaul Japanese education for women. From 1896, she tutored two daughters of imperial concubine Sachiko Sono: Tsunemiya (Princess Masako Takeda) and Kanemiya (Fusako Kitashirakawa). In 1899 she established Jissen Jogakkō, later Jissen Women's University, for Japanese middle-class women and female Chinese exchange students, and the Joshi Kōgei Gakkō (Women's vocational craft school) for the lower classes. In 1901 she founded the Aikoku Fujinkai, or Patriotic Women's Association, and in 1907 she withdrew from working with the upper classes to concentrate on educating middle- and lower-class women.

Utako Shimoda gave public speeches, which were often printed in women's magazines. She also wrote many women's biographies, believing them important for women's moral education. These included the biographies of Japanese women such as Empress Jingū and Ōbako, Eastern women such as the mother of Mencius, and Western women such as Princess Alice of the United Kingdom, Catherine Gladstone, Hannah Duston, Dolley Madison, Eleanor of Toledo, Mary Ball Washington, and Charlotte Corday. She also helped Asaoka Hajime translate Renaissance educator François Fénelon's work on women's education.

Her Jissen Jogakkō was one of the first Japanese women's schools to take Chinese students, at first all the daughters of expatriates, but from 1903 onwards students also came from China to be educated there. She helped found the Zhouxin She (Society for Renewal) in Shanghai, and her works were published in Mandarin translation in its journal Dalu (Chinese: 大陸).

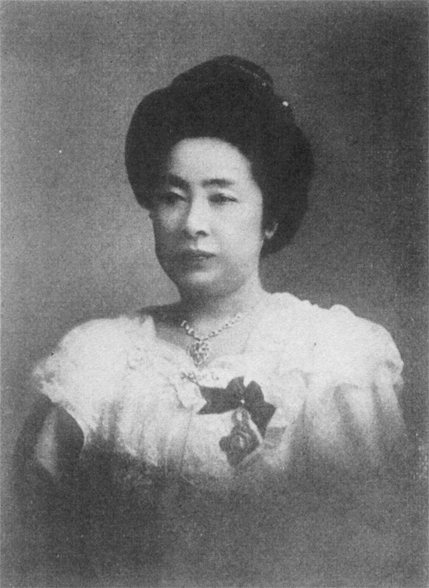
Utako Shimoda portrayed in a Gakushūin school history published in 1935, the year before her death

In 1907, the Heimin Shinbun (Common People's Newspaper) published (over 42 days) an article series called Yōfu Shimoda Utako (妖婦下田歌子, Enchantress Shimoda Utako). It attacked corrupt right-wing politicians by alleging that Shimoda Utako was sexually involved with Itō Hirobumi (a former prime minister), Yamagata Aritomo (another former prime minister, and a military leader), and Inoue Kaoru (a cabinet minister). The issues containing the article series were banned by the government. There were also rumours connecting her to the emperor and Kichisaburō Iino (a politically-powerful Shinto mystic). Utako Shimoda's powerful supporters did not publicly defend her, and in 1906 she had to step down as head of the Gakushūin Women's Academy, giving leadership to the headmaster of the male division, Marusuke Nogi.

In 1990, Utako Shimoda was the subject of the biographical novel centering on this scandal, Mikado no onna (ja:ミカドの淑女, The Emperor's Woman), by Naoki Prize-winning popular author Mariko Hayashi (ja).

Utako Shimoda's vision and work did much to modernise and improve women's education in Japan (she is even responsible for the navy-style girls' school uniform), not just in the realm of improving the mind, but in physical education as well. She was an early colleague and training partner of Jigoro Kano, the founder of modern Judo. She founded three women's schools and wrote over 80 books. She died from pneumonia in 1936, aged 82.

The Shimoda Utako Research Institute for Women is named after her.

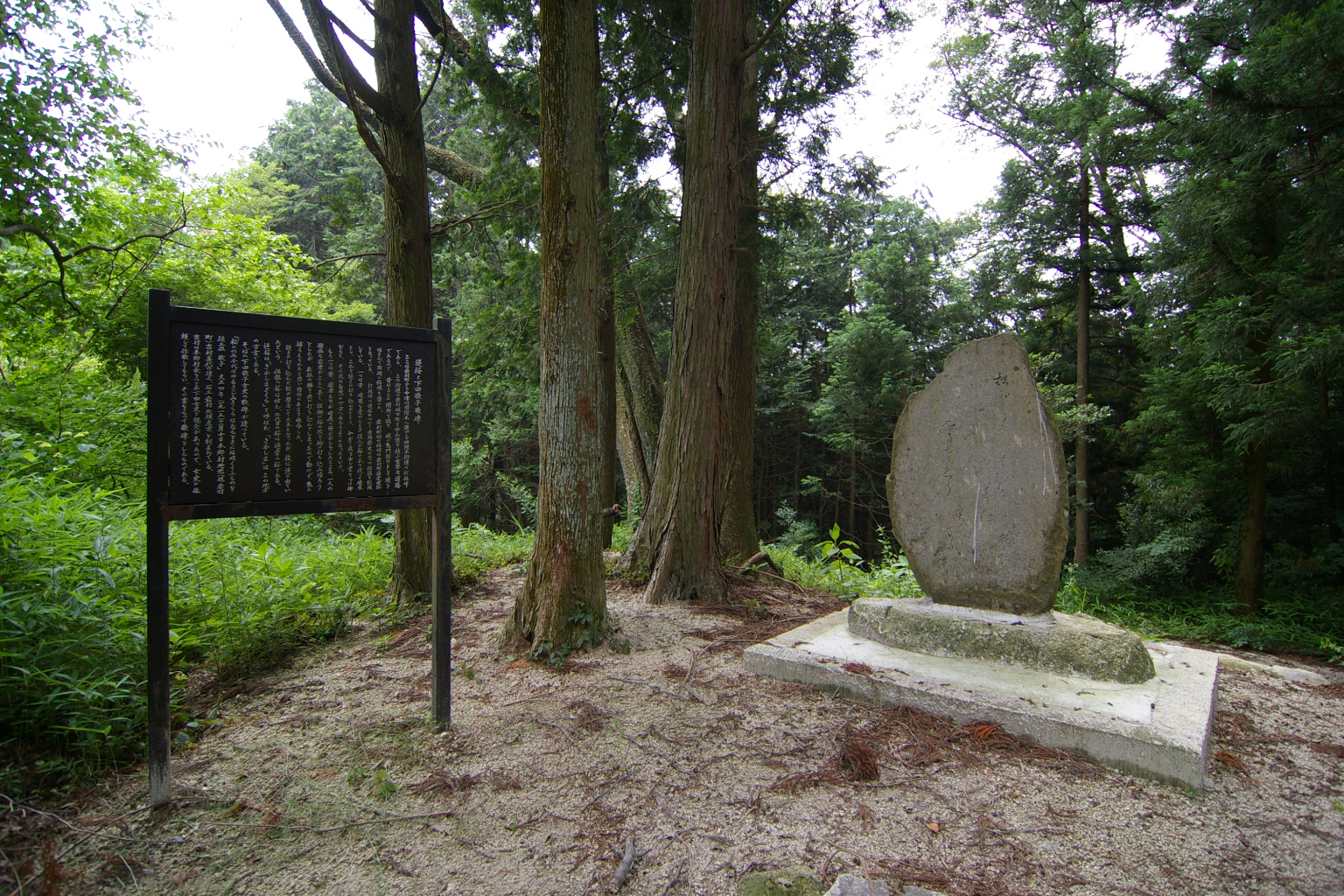
A memorial near her birthplace

== Teachings and politics ==
Politically, Shimoda Utako was royalist and nationalist; she supported an expansionist colonial foreign policy, feeling that it was Japan's divine destiny to lead East Asia to a higher level of civilization and wealth, already attained in the West. She warned about and opposed Western imperialism. While she favoured a nationalistic education that instilled patriotism, she judged that the patriotism taught in the west was excessive, and too vengeful, belligerent, and prideful. She considered Chinese and Korean women to be dōhō 同胞 (of the same womb) as Japanese women, though not of the same race, and inferior in education, opportunities, and "superstitious" culture, not intelligence or abilities. Her views have also been described as supporting eugenics. She considered herself a moderate reformer, a Secchūha (折衷派), and felt that aspects of Western culture should be selectively adopted to strengthen Japan.

Shimoda Utako opposed the subjugation of women, and their absolute obedience to men; she encouraged wives to scold their husbands if they behaved unjustly or unvirtuously, and to develop self-respect and dignity. She also said that daughters had a right to express an opinion on an arranged marriage.

She judged that Eastern cultures demeaned women and valued men, while Western ones did the reverse. She was surprised by how kind Western men were to their wives, and as she attributed many of the differences in marriage dynamics to the practice of monogamy in the West, she hoped that its introduction in Japan would improve the status of women. She argued that women and men had separate spheres and abilities. She thought women's ideal sphere was domestic; they should be wives, mothers, and lords of their households. She advocated that they should control their family finances, and engage in charitable social work, but acknowledged that financial necessity or the good of the country might require that women work outside the home, in which case daycares were valuable. She also supported women taking professional roles, such as physician, journalist, or nurse (she was an admirer of epidemiologist Florence Nightingale). She considered devoting oneself to religion, public service, or an art in which one was very talented, was an acceptable alternative to marriage and a reason for women to remain single.

Shimoda Utako thought that women should study world affairs, geography, and history, but should not be involved in politics; she opposed women's suffrage. She encouraged bilingualism and had her students learn English and Japanese.

She considered that the historically high status of women in Japan had been brought low by the rise of militarism after the Heian period, and religious teachings on the inferiority of women. She cited Amaterasu, the female ancestor of the imperial lineage, and other early Japanese stories, as evidence for the high status of Japanese women in the past. She criticized the period of warrior rule (which she saw as lasting seven centuries, from the late Heian Period, in the 12th century, until the Meiji Era, 1868 to 1912). She characterized it as a time when physical strength became of paramount importance, and thus women's status sank to the point that they became "men's slaves or material possessions". She saw it as her role to restore the historically high status of Japanese women, and thus raise Japanese civilization.

Shimoda Utako pointed out the low regard in which the warrior-led society had held economic skills and virtues, attributing the greater wealth of Western nations to the cultural unwillingness of the Japanese to work hard and manage money well. On the other hand, she criticized Westerners as greedy. She lectured on the advantage of the western custom of pocket-money, and taught that household economics were the foundation of a nation's wealth.

She wrote two biographies of Queen Victoria; she considered the success of the British Empire to have been caused by Victoria's virtues. Shimoda Utako praised her as a wise wife, mother, and monarch, describing her philanthropic work and her insistence that her children learn manual skill, the value of labour, and sympathy and understanding for the poor.

She criticized traditional Japanese Buddhist teachings that women were too sinful to be saved. She criticized the Confucian teachings that women should obey their fathers, husbands, and sons, while men could or should divorce their wives under some conditions. Shimoda Utako viewed Christianity as moderating the cruel and arrogant natures of Westerners, and churchgoing as inculcating morality; for the Japanese she advocated adherence to a religion, any religion that did not conflict with national polity (kokutai) or loyalty to the emperor of Japan, and using Sundays to cultivate virtue (for instance, by visiting graves or a shrine, or attending moral lectures).

Shimoda Utako placed a high value on physical education, writing: "Since the laws of biology dictate that inferior health is accompanied by inferior moral qualities and inferior intellect, I should not have to argue once again that we need to have a great reform in this aspect for the sake of our Japanese citizens' future." She also considered physical health to be necessary to a colonial empire. While she considered both men and women in Japan to be less healthy than in the West, she judged that women were much worse off, being confined by custom to their homes and restrictive garments. She successfully advocated reform dress. She also opposed Chinese footbinding, requiring that Chinese students attending her school unbind their feet.

== Role in the hakama ==
Despite her influence in many intellectual spheres, Shimoda Utako's role in the hakama is often overlooked. As a product of rapid Westernization in the 1880s, female students would wear Western clothing as school dress. But, Utako Shimoda reckoned this to be impractical and figured pieces like the corset were harmful and restrictive. Similarly, if schools were to adopt the kimono, this would also pose too restrictive, preventing students from partaking in physical activities. Shimoda Utako had a problem to solve: female students needed a uniform that touched on Japanese traditionality, something that fed into a Japanese identity but also embodied practicality. Utako pulled from the hakama, which is traditionally worn by men, and fashioned a new version with inspiration from the uniforms of ladies-in-waiting. The new hakama was quickly adopted into elite urban schools. The wide-legged pants became a model of rational clothing for all women.This bolstered a sense of seriousness for Japanese women in education at a time when female participation in academics was highly contested. Although the pants were eventually phased out to make way for changing trends and new uniform designs, the female students still wear hakama as a tradition to graduation ceremonies.

== Schools and organizations ==
Shimoda Utako was involved in leadership roles in numerous schools:

- Kazoku Jogakkō 華族女學校 (later part of the Gakushūin 學習院)
- Jissen Jogakkō 實踐女學校 (as founder)
- Joshi Kōgei Gakkō 女子工藝學校 (as founder)
- Junshin Jogakkō 順心女學校
- Ōmi Joshi Jitsumu Gakkō 淡海女子實務學校
- Meitoku Jogakkō 明徳女學校
- Aikoku Yakan Jogakkō 愛國夜間女學校

She was also involved with civil society groups:

- Aikoku Fujinkai 愛國婦人會 (as founder)
- Zhouxin She 作新社, Shanghai, 1901 (helped found)
- Women's Christian Temperance Union

== Selected publications ==
- Stories of Exemplary Girls of Japan (内國少女鑑, Naikoku Shōjo Kagami) (1901)
- Stories of Exemplary Girls of Foreign Lands (外國少女鑑, Gaikoku Shōjo Kagami) (1902)
- Good Wives and Wise Mothers (良妻と賢母, Ryōsai to kenbo) (1912)
- A Practical Guide to Household Chores: Hygiene and Economy (家事実修法：衛生経済)

== Selected students ==
- Qiu Jin (Chinese: 秋瑾), revolutionary
- Yànān Chén (Chinese: 陳彦安)
