= Jissen Women's University Junior College =

Private college in Shibuya, Tokyo, Japan

- 実践女子大学短期大学部; じっせんじょしだいがくたんきだいがくぶ
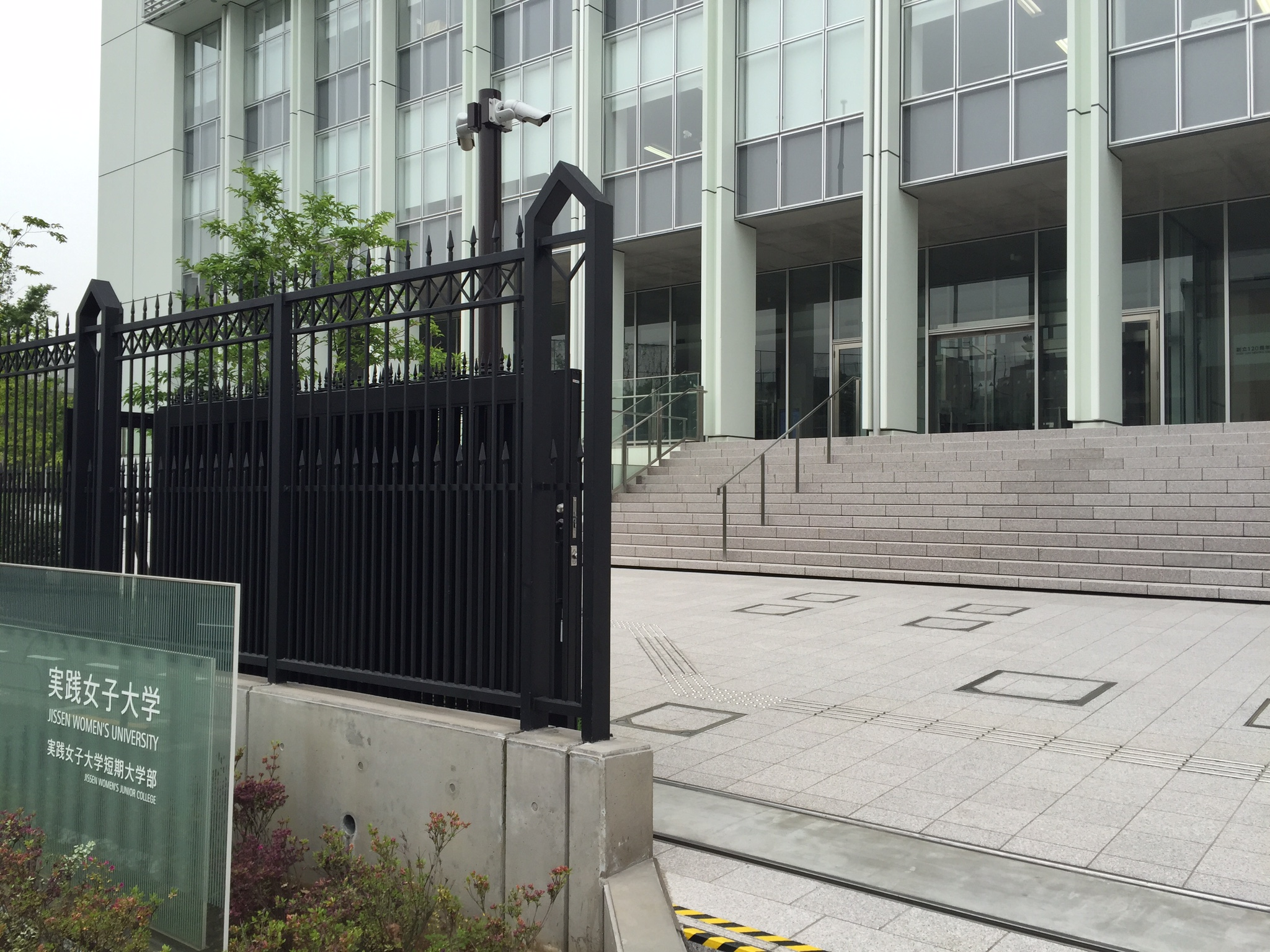
- Shibuya Campus Jissen Women's University Junior College (Tokyo) Jissen Women's University Junior College (Japan)
- Other name: Jissen JC
- Type: Private
- Established: 1899
- Parent institution: Jissen Women's Educational Institute
- Location: 1-1-49 Higashi, Shibuya City, Tokyo, Japan; 35.6581°N 139.7101°E
- Campus: Shibuya (Shibuya City, Tokyo)
- Website: www.jissen.ac.jp

Jissen Women's University Junior College (実践女子大学短期大学部, Jissen joshi daigaku tanki daigakubu; lit. 'Jissen Women's University Junior College Department') is a private university in Shibuya, Tokyo, Japan. It was founded in 1899 as a girls' school and became a junior college in 1950.

The college's mission is "nurturing women who are capable of displaying dignity, elegance, independence, and self-management." Its logo features the image of a cherry blossom.

== History ==
The college's predecessor institution, the Jissen Girls' School, was established in Kōjimachi, Tokyo in 1899. The Jissen Women's Educational Institute established the Jissen Women's Educational Institute Junior College (実践女子学園短期大学, Jissen joshi gakuen tanki daigaku) in 1950 when the junior college system was introduced in Japan. The college was located in Tokiwamatsu Town, Shibuya City and consisted of one academic department—Home Economics.

A year later, in 1951, the Home Economics Department split into two majors—human life and apparel and textiles. The college's curriculum continued to expand, adding a Japanese Literature Department and an English Literature Department in 1952. In 1967, Home Economics split into three tracks: human life, nutrition, and apparel and Textiles. The college also added courses on library science and natural history.

The college was renamed Jissen Women's Junior College (実践女子短期大学, Jissen joshi tanki daigaku) in 1968. It moved to the former site of Shukutoku Gakuen Junior College in Matsubushi Town, Kita-Katsushika District, Saitama Prefecture in 1972. The Matsubushi campus became part of Taishō University in 1976 and relocated to the Jissen Women's University campus in Hino City.

In 1988, the college's Japanese Literature Department became the Department of Japanese Literature; the English Literature Department became the Department of English Literature; and the Home Economics Department became the Department of Life and Culture. Two new majors, life and culture and food science and nutrition, were created for the latter. In 2000, the Department of Japanese Literature became the Department of Japanese Communication, and the Department of English Literature became the Department of English Communication. In addition, the Department of Life and Culture split to create two new departments—the life and culture major became the Department of Living and Welfare, and the food science and nutrition major became the Department of Food Science and Nutrition.

Although the college started a nutrition educator program in 2005, it stopped recruiting students for the Department of Living and Welfare in 2011 and to the Department of Food Science and Nutrition in 2013, phasing out both academic programs. In 2014, the college was renamed Jissen Women's University Junior College (Department) and was moved to its current location in Shibuya City, Tokyo.

== Academics ==
Jissen Women's University Junior College includes two academic departments. The Department of Japanese Communication consists of coursework in communication, Japanese literature, women's literature, children's literature, and women's literature. The Department of English Communication consists of coursework in integrated English, international communication, tourism business, and practical career planning. Students can acquire the qualifications to be a librarian through either department. In the past, the college has offered teacher training courses to provide the qualifications for a Second Class Junior High School Teacher's License and a High School Teacher's License.

Study abroad is offered through Stott's College, the University of the Sunshine Coast, and Victoria University in Australia; Asia Pacific University of Technology & Innovation in Malaysia; and Kapiʻolani Community College and Leeward Community College in Hawaii, United States. As of 2020, the college also offers summer overseas language training in Canada, China, England, France, Germany, Malaysia, South Korea, and the United States. Currently, the school does not offer TOEFL exams and interviews.

Many graduates from the junior college transfer to Jissen Women's University which offers a continuation of studies in similar academic departments.

== Campus ==
The Shibuya campus consists of a ten-story building. located at 1-1-49 Higashi, Shibuya City, Tokyo. The campus is around a ten-minute walk from JR (Yamanote Line, Saikyō Line, and Shōnan-Shinjuku Line), Tokyo Metro (Ginza Line, Hanzōmon Line, and Fukutoshin Line), Tōkyū (Tōyoko Line and Den-en-toshi Line), and Keiō Inokashira Line East Exit C1 from Shibuya Station. It is a twelve-minute walk from Tokyo Metro (Ginza Line, Hanzōmon Line, and Chiyoda Line) Exit B1 from Omotesandō Station.

The building is shared with the faculty of Jissen Women's University's Humanities Department and Human and Social Studies Department. The two institutions also share a library.

== Student life ==
Student clubs include sports and culture groups. These clubs are jointly run with Jissen Women's University. As of 2020, there are 65 university-approved student clubs, including those under suspension of activities and one semi-official group. Campus-wide events include the annual Tokiwa Festival, concerts, and talk shows featuring celebrities and comedy. Department of Japanese Communication students edit Hino City's garbage information magazine.

== Notable people ==
=== Faculty and staff ===
- Tetsuto Uno, first president
- Tokuhei Yamagishi
- Kenji Shuzui
- Rikichi Katsurada
- Motoi Tada
- Nōichi Imoto
- Masami Yoshikawa
- Junsaku Fundō
- Toshirō Iijima
- Shigeo Yuasa, became president in 2007.

==== Alumni ====
- Kazuko Inano (non-degreed) – actor
- Keiko Kurihara –actress
- Sakura Tange – voice actress
- Keiko Mori – former Nishinippon Broadcasting announcer
- Yōko Matsuoka – former member of Cent. Force
- Yasuko Kuramoto – fashion model
- Taki Kusano – novelist
- Yōko Umeda – novelist and sports writer
- Hiroko Kitamura – freelance announcer
- Hazuki Kurosawa – Gravure idol

== See also ==
- List of junior colleges in Japan
