= Qiu Jin =

Chinese feminist and revolutionary (1875–1907)

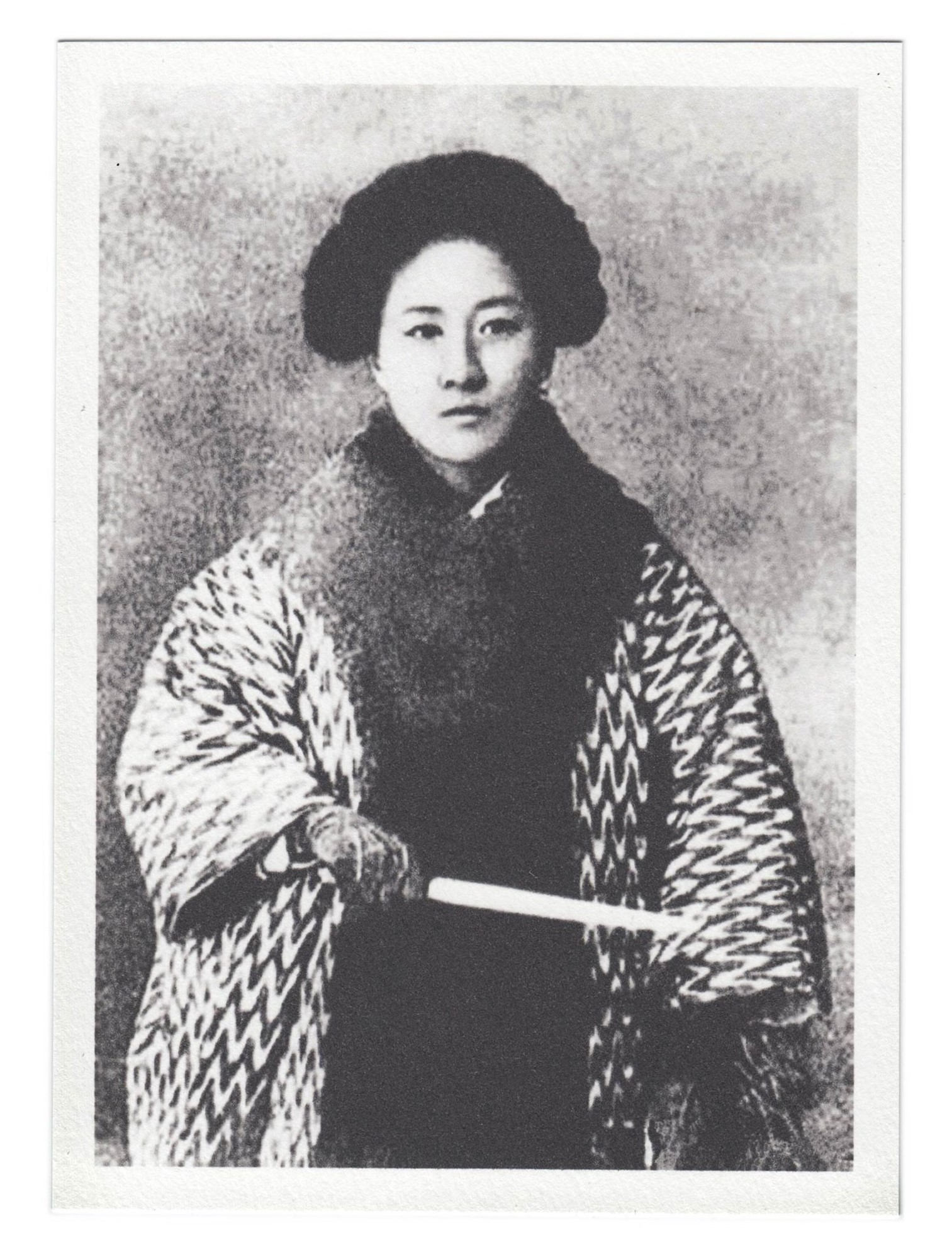
- Born: 8 November 1875; Fuzhou, Fujian, Qing dynasty
- Died: 15 July 1907 (aged 31); Shanyin, Shaoxing, Zhejiang, Qing dynasty
- Cause of death: Execution by decapitation
- Political party: Guangfuhui; Tongmenghui
- Spouse: Wang Tingjun
- Children: 2

Chinese name
- Chinese: 秋瑾
Transcriptions
Standard Mandarin
- Hanyu Pinyin: Qiū Jǐn
- Wade–Giles: Ch'iu Chin
- IPA: [tɕʰjóʊ.tɕìn]

Courtesy name
- Chinese: 璿卿
Transcriptions
Standard Mandarin
- Hanyu Pinyin: Xuánqīng
- IPA: [ɕwǎntɕʰíŋ]

Alternative courtesy name
- Traditional Chinese: 競雄
- Simplified Chinese: 竞雄
Transcriptions
Standard Mandarin
- Hanyu Pinyin: Jìngxióng
- IPA: [tɕîŋɕjʊ̂ŋ]

Sobriquet
- Traditional Chinese: 鑑湖女俠
- Simplified Chinese: 鉴湖女侠
- Literal meaning: Woman Knight of Mirror Lake
Transcriptions
Standard Mandarin
- Hanyu Pinyin: Jiànhú Nǚxiá
- IPA: [tɕjɛ̂nxǔ nỳɕjǎ]

Qiu Jin (Chinese: 秋瑾; pinyin: Qiū Jǐn; Wade–Giles: Ch'iu Chin; 8 November 1875 – 15 July 1907) was a Chinese revolutionary, feminist, and writer. Qiu was executed after a failed uprising against the Qing dynasty and is considered a national heroine in China and a martyr of republicanism and feminism.

Born into a wealthy family in Fuzhou, Qiu Jin spent her childhood in Zhejiang, where she received an education, uncommon for women at the time. In the early 1900s, she left her husband and children to study in Japan. After returning to China, Qiu Jin became actively involved in revolutionary activities.

== Biography ==
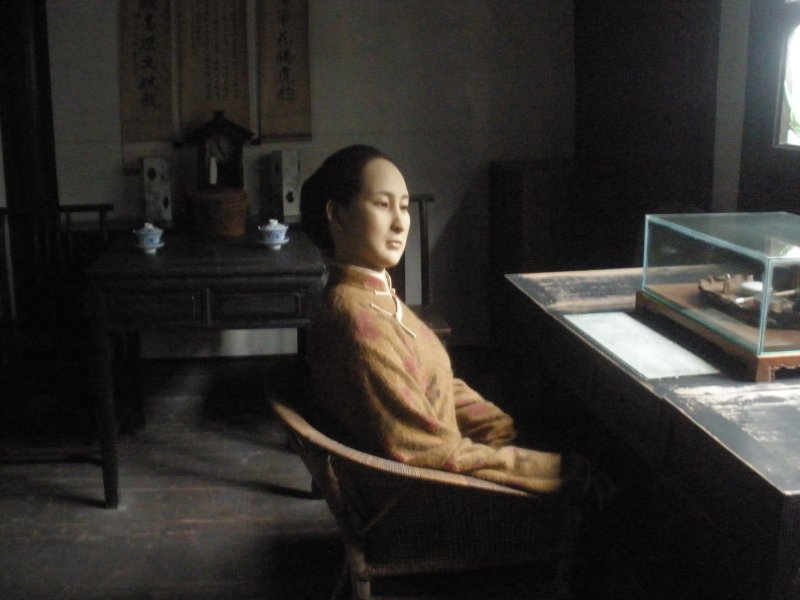
Wax figure of Qiu Jin at her desk

Born in Fuzhou, China, Qiu Jin spent her childhood in her ancestral home, Shaoxing, Zhejiang. Qiu was born into a wealthy family. Her grandfather worked in the Xiamen city government and was responsible for the city's defense. Zhejiang province was famous for female education, and Qiu Jin had support from her family when she was young to pursue her educational interests. Her father, Qiu Shounan, was a government official and her mother came from a distinguished literati-official family. Qiu Jin's wealthy and educated background, along with her early exposure to political ideologies were key factors in her transformation to becoming a female pioneer for the woman's liberation movement and the republican revolution in China.

In the early 1900s, Japan had started to experience Western influences earlier than China. As to not fall behind, the Qing government sent many elites to learn from the Japanese. Qiu Jin was one of these elites that got the chance to study overseas, although it was self-funded rather than being part of the Qing dynasty's study abroad programs. After studying in a women's school in Japan, Qiu returned to China to participate in a variety of revolutionary activities; and through her involvement with these activities, it became clear how Qiu wanted others to perceive her. Qiu called herself 'Female Knight-Errant of Jian Lake' — the role of the knight-errant, established in the Han dynasty, was a prototypically male figure known for swordsmanship, bravery, faithfulness, and self-sacrifice — and 'Vying for Heroism'.

=== Early life in China ===
==== Childhood activities ====
Qiu Jin had her feet bound and began writing poetry at an early age. With the support from her family, Qiu Jin also learned how to ride a horse and use a sword—activities that usually only men were permitted to learn at the time.

==== Marriage ====
In 1896 Qiu Jin got married. Although she was only 21, this was considered late for a woman at the time. Qiu Jin's father arranged her marriage to Wang Tingjun, the youngest son of a wealthy merchant in Hunan province. Qiu Jin did not get along well with her husband, as her husband only cared about enjoying himself. Unhappy in her marriage, Qiu sought personal and intellectual fulfillment by obtaining education in Japan.

==== Aftermath of First Sino-Japanese War ====
The Qing government lost the Sino-Japanese War from 1894 to 1895. The loss woke the Qing government up to the fact that China was no longer the most powerful nation even in Asia. Japan had started learning Western technology and accepting Western standards earlier than China. This motivated the Qing government to progress and modernize. The Dowager Empress Cixi looked to Japan as a model to emulate, and her court organized tours to Japan. Many Chinese elites were sent to Japan to learn how they could build China like the Japanese were able to do. Qiu Jin was one of the girls who got the chance to study overseas as these opportunities were only given to the children of higher social class.

=== Life while studying in Japan ===
In 1903, she decided to travel overseas and study in Tokyo, Japan, leaving her two children behind. She initially entered a Japanese language school in Surugadai, but later transferred to the Girls' Practical School in Kōjimachi, run by Shimoda Utako (later to become Jissen Women's University). The school prepared Qiu Jin with the skills she needed for revolutionary activities later on. With the education from Shimoda school, many female activists participated in the Republican Revolution in 1911. During her time in Tokyo, Qiu also helped to establish the Encompassing Love Society, a women's group that promoted women's education and protested the Russian presence in northeast China. She was very fond of martial arts, and she was known by her acquaintances for wearing Western male dress and for her nationalist, anti-Manchu ideology. She joined the anti-Qing society Guangfuhui, led by Cai Yuanpei, which in 1905 merged with a variety of overseas Chinese revolutionary groups to form the Tongmenghui, led by Sun Yat-sen. Already known as a calligrapher and a poet, Qiu described herself as "tossing aside the brush to join the military ranks," in encouraging educated women not to waste time on poetry but to instead engage in direct action.

Within the Revolutionary Alliance, Qiu was responsible for Zhejiang Province. Because the Chinese overseas students were divided between those who wanted an immediate return to China to join the ongoing revolution and those who wanted to stay in Japan to prepare for the future, a meeting of Zhejiang students was held to debate the issue. At the meeting, Qiu allied unquestioningly with the former group and thrust a dagger into the podium, declaring, "If I return to the motherland, surrender to the Manchu barbarians, and deceive the Han people, stab me with this dagger!" She subsequently returned to China in 1906 along with about 2,000 students.

While still in Tokyo, Qiu single-handedly edited the journal Vernacular Journal (Baihua Bao). A number of issues were published using vernacular Chinese as a medium of revolutionary propaganda. In one issue, Qiu wrote A Respectful Proclamation to China's 200 Million Women Comrades, a manifesto within which she lamented the problems caused by bound feet and oppressive marriages. Having suffered from both ordeals herself, Qiu explained her experience in the manifesto and received an overwhelmingly sympathetic response from her readers. Also outlined in the manifesto was Qiu's belief that a better future for women lay under a Western-type government instead of the Qing government that was in power at the time. She joined forces with her cousin Xu Xilin and together they worked to unite many secret revolutionary societies to work together for the overthrow of the Qing dynasty.

Between 1905 and 1907, Qiu Jin was also writing a novel called Stones of the Jingwei Bird in traditional ballad form, a type of literature often composed by women for women audiences. The novel describes the relationship between five wealthy women who decide to flee their families and the arranged marriages awaiting them in order to study and join revolutionary activities in Tokyo. Titles for the later uncompleted chapters suggest that the women will go on to talk about "education, manufacturing, military activities, speechmaking, and direct political action, eventually overthrowing the Qing dynasty and establishing a republic" — all of which were subject matters that Qiu either participated in or advocated for.

=== Life after returning to China ===
After returning to China in the early months of 1906, Qiu became the principal of Datong School in her hometown of Shaoxing, Zhejiang. The Datong School was established by Xu Xilin , a revolutionary whom Qiu Jin had studied with in Japan. The Dantong School was not only intended to provide modern education for women but also intended to promote opposition to the Qing government. Qiu Jin used her position as principal to organize a women's army within the faculty of the school.

Through Qiu Jin’s role as a principal at the Datong School, the school’s curriculum combined academic instruction with physical and military training. The academic curriculum included foreign languages(Japanese and English), geography, and history as some of their courses. Military training included military strategy, physical education, military drill, and weaponry with the inclusion of rifle drills. Many students unbound their feet to participate in the training. Local children watched the student drills with rifles, and Qiu Jin riding horseback around Shaoxing wearing men's clothing and Western leather shoes.

The Datong School’s establishment became associated with anti-Qing revolutionary activity. Qiu Jin and her fellow revolutionaries promoted opposition to the Qing dynastic rule and plotted the assassinations of government officials in Henan and Zhejiang. After a failed attempt to assassinate the governor of Anhui, Xu Xilin was arrested and executed. Later Qing authorities issued a warrant for Qiu Jin, partially due to her position at Datong. Qiu Jin heard of the news of Xu Xilin's arrest as it reached Shaoxin. Despite having time to escape after being informed she remained at Datong School. Qiu Jin was executed by beheading at dawn on 15 July 1907, the day after her arrest.

=== Death ===
In 1907, Xu Xilin, Qiu's friend and the Datong School's co-founder was executed for attempting to assassinate his Manchu superior. In the same year, the authorities arrested Qiu at the Datong School for her involvement in a failed attempt to overthrow the Qing government. She was tortured but refused to admit her involvement in the plot. Instead the authorities used her own writings as incrimination against her and, a few days later, she was publicly beheaded in her home village, Shanyin, at the age of 31. Her last written words, her death poem, uses the literal meaning of her name, Autumn Gem, to lament of the failed revolution that she would never see take place:

秋風秋雨愁煞人
(Autumn wind, autumn rain — they make one die of sorrow)

During Qiu's life, she also drew support from two close friends: Xu Zihua and Wu Zhiying — both of whom had sworn sisterhood with her. In the months following Qiu's execution, Wu wrote three essays mourning Qiu — in which she criticized Qing officials for the execution and argued that Qiu Jin had been slandered and her actions "unjustly besmirched". Soon after, the two sworn sisters set out to bury Qiu properly near West Lake, fulfilling Qiu's wish to be buried near heroes of earlier periods. Qing officials soon ordered for her tomb to be razed, but Qiu Jin's brother managed to retrieve her body in time. Ultimately, Wu Zhiying took possession of the memorial stele, installing it in her own house and selling stele rubbings as a way to commemorate her fallen friend.

To this day, people continue to have varying opinions towards Qiu's death. Many said that her death was unnecessary because she had enough time to escape before being caught by imperial soldiers. In fact, Qiu's friends even warned her of incoming soldiers immediately after Xu Xilin's death. Lu Xun, one of China's greatest 20th-century writers, was one of her biggest critics; he "[...] believed Qiu's reckless behavior in Shaoxing was linked to the enormous adulation she received during her time in Japan." She was "clapped to death," he told a friend — although there is no clear explanation as to why Qiu decided to remain at the school despite knowing that the authorities were on their way.

== Legacy ==
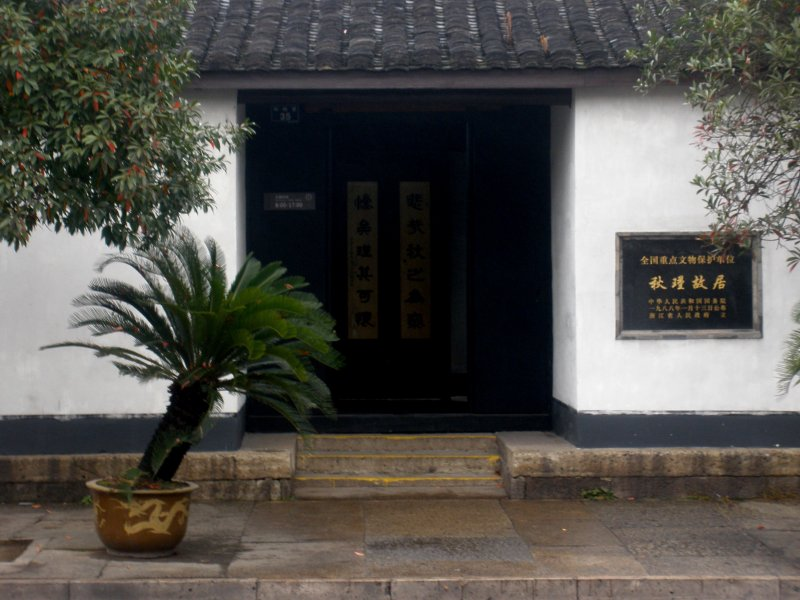
The entrance to her former residence in Shaoxing, now a museum

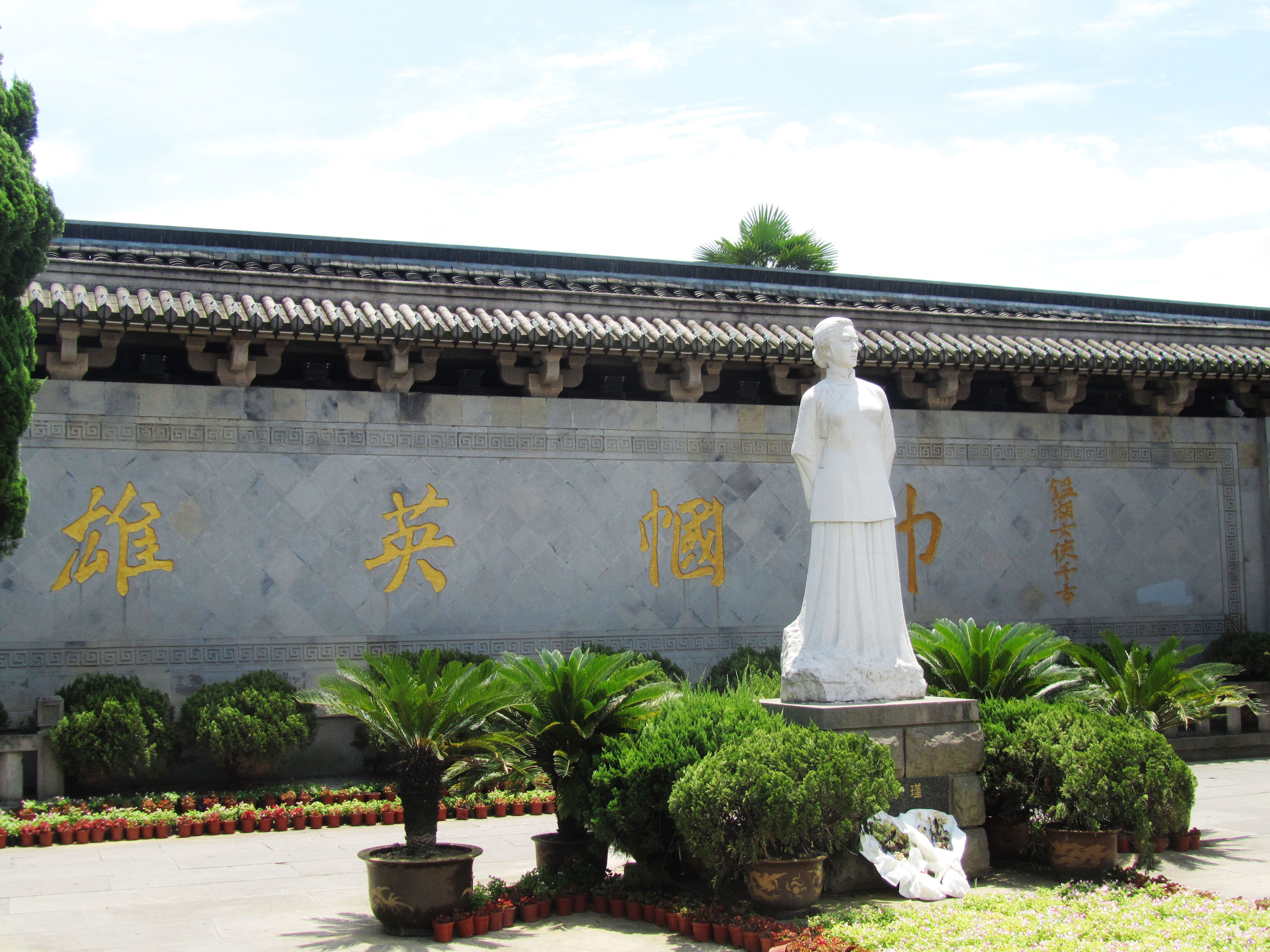
The Statue of Martyr Qiu Jin

Qiu's view was that religion distracted women from their duties to each other and to the nation. Impacted by Qiu's example, founders of new women's schools emphasized teaching of scientific theory and explanations for nature.

Qiu's death was a major topic in late Qing era newspapers. Newspapers with a range of political perspectives described her treatment as unjust and compared her to a contemporary Dou E. These media discussions of Qiu focused on her mistreatment in the justice system of a corrupt government; while they acknowledged her advocacy for women, they denied her revolutionary activities.

Qiu also inspired literary works in the years immediately following her death. The Shenzhou Daily's serialized fiction Resurrection at Xuanting depicts Qiu Jin being revived under the name Xia Yu. Lu Xun's short story Medicine's protagonist is also named Xia Yu, as a reference to Qiu Jin. Other works created soon after her death include the zaju drama Tragedy at Xuanting and the novel Frost in June.

She is buried beside West Lake in Hangzhou. In 1930, the Shaoxing built the Monument to the Martyr Qiu Jin at the location where she was executed.Qiu was posthumously immortalized in the Republic of China's popular consciousness and literature. These remembrances tended to downplay her advocacy for women and emphasize her revolutionary activities. The Nationalist government promoted her story on The Nationalist Government Radio Station. Among its initial programs was a baijiao gu performance of Qiu Jin's Martyrdom. The Nationalists' Propaganda Department instructed local governments to obtain recordings of the program to help propagate revolutionary deeds. On 14 October 1935, the Nationalist government issued a decree eulogizing Qiu Jin.

Nationalist era plays written about Qiu Jin include Xia Yan's The Spirit of Freedom (1936) and Yan Yiyan's Qiu Jin (1940). The People's Republic of China established a museum for her in Shaoxing, Qiu Jin's Former Residence (紹興秋瑾故居). Chinese scholar Hu Ying, professor of East Asian Languages and Literature at the University of California, Irvine, published a monograph on Qiu in 2016, Burying Autumn, that explores Qiu Jin's friendship with her sworn sisters Wu Zhiying and Xu Zihua and situates her work in the larger sociopolitical and literary context of the time.

Her life has been portrayed in plays, popular movies (including the 1972 Hong Kong film Chow Ken (《秋瑾》), and the documentary Autumn Gem, written by Rae Chang and directed by Chang and Adam Tow. One film, simply titled Qiu Jin, was released in 1983 and directed by Xie Jin. Another film, released in 2011, Jing Xiong Nüxia Qiu Jin (競雄女俠秋瑾), or The Woman Knight of Mirror Lake, was directed by Herman Yau. She is briefly shown in the beginning of 1911, being led to the execution ground to be beheaded. The movie was directed by Jackie Chan and Zhang Li. Immediately after her death Chinese playwrights used the incident, "resulting in at least eight plays before the end of the Ch'ing dynasty." In 2018, The New York Times published a belated obituary for her.

== Literary works ==
Because Qiu is mainly remembered in the West as revolutionary and feminist, her poetry and essays are often overlooked (though owing to her early death, they are few). Her writing reflects an exceptional education in classical literature, and she writes traditional poetry (shi and ci). Qiu composes verse with a wide range of metaphors and allusions that mix classical mythology with revolutionary rhetoric.

For example, in a poem, A Reply Verse in Matching Rhyme (for Ishii-kun, a Japanese friend), she wrote the following:

《日人石井君索和即用原韻》
Chinese	English
漫云女子不英雄， 萬里乘風獨向東。 詩思一帆海空闊， 夢魂三島月玲瓏。 銅駝已陷悲回首， 汗馬終慚未有功。 如許傷心家國恨， 那堪客裡度春風。	Don't speak of how women can't become heroes: alone, I rode the winds eastward, for ten thousand leagues. My poetic ponderings expanded, a sail between sky and sea, dreaming of Japan's three islands, delicate jade under moonlight. Grieving the fall of bronze camels, guardians of China's palace gates, a warhorse is disgraced, not one battle yet won. As my heart shatters with rage over my homeland's troubles, how can I linger, a guest abroad, savoring spring winds?

Editors Sun Chang and Saussy explain the metaphors as follows:

line 4: "Your islands" translates "sandao," literally "three islands," referring to Honshu, Shikoku and Kyushu, while omitting Hokkaido - an old-fashioned way of referring to Japan.

line 6: ... the conditions of the bronze camels, symbolic guardians placed before the imperial palace, is traditionally considered to reflect the state of health of the ruling dynasty. But in Qiu's poetry, it reflects instead the state of health of China.

On leaving Beijing for Japan, she wrote a poem, Reflections (written during travels in Japan) summarizing her life until that point:

《有怀——游日本时作》
Chinese	English
日月無光天地昏， 沉沉女界有誰援。 釵環典質浮滄海， 骨肉分離出玉門。 放足湔除千載毒， 熱心喚起百花魂。 可憐一幅鮫綃帕， 半是血痕半淚痕。	The sun and moon without light. Sky and earth in darkness. Who can uplift the sinking world of women? I pawned my jewels to sail across the open seas, parting from my children as I left the border at Jade Gate. Unbinding my feet to pour out a millennium's poisons, I arouse the spirit of women, hundreds of flowers, abloom. Oh, this poor handkerchief made of merfolk-woven silk, half stained with blood and half soaked in tears.

War flames in the north‒when will it all end?

I hear the fighting at sea continues unabated.

Like the women of Qishi, I worry about my country in vain;

It's hard to trade kerchief and dress for a helmet

== Gallery ==
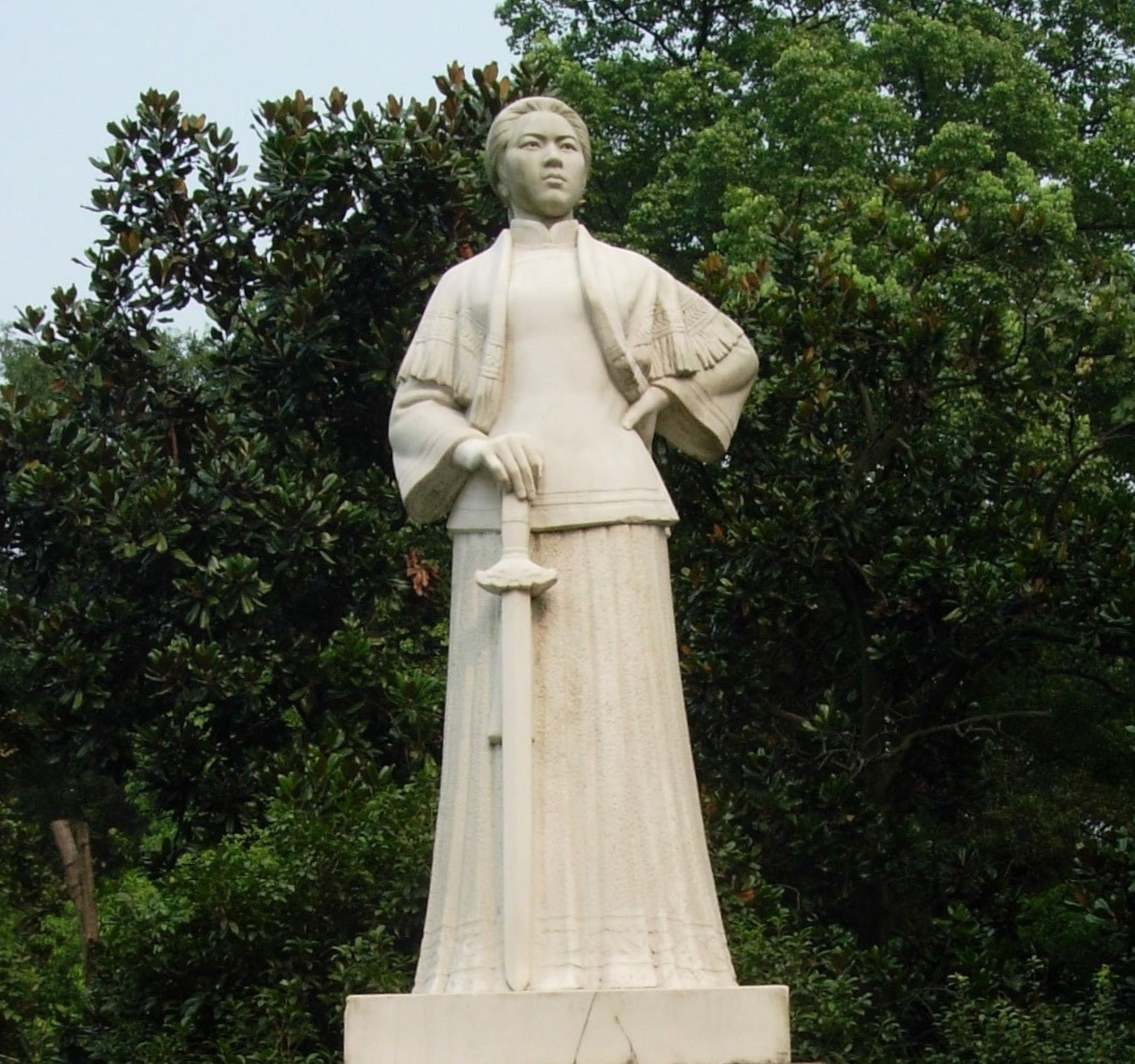
Statue of Qiu Jin beside West Lake in Hangzhou

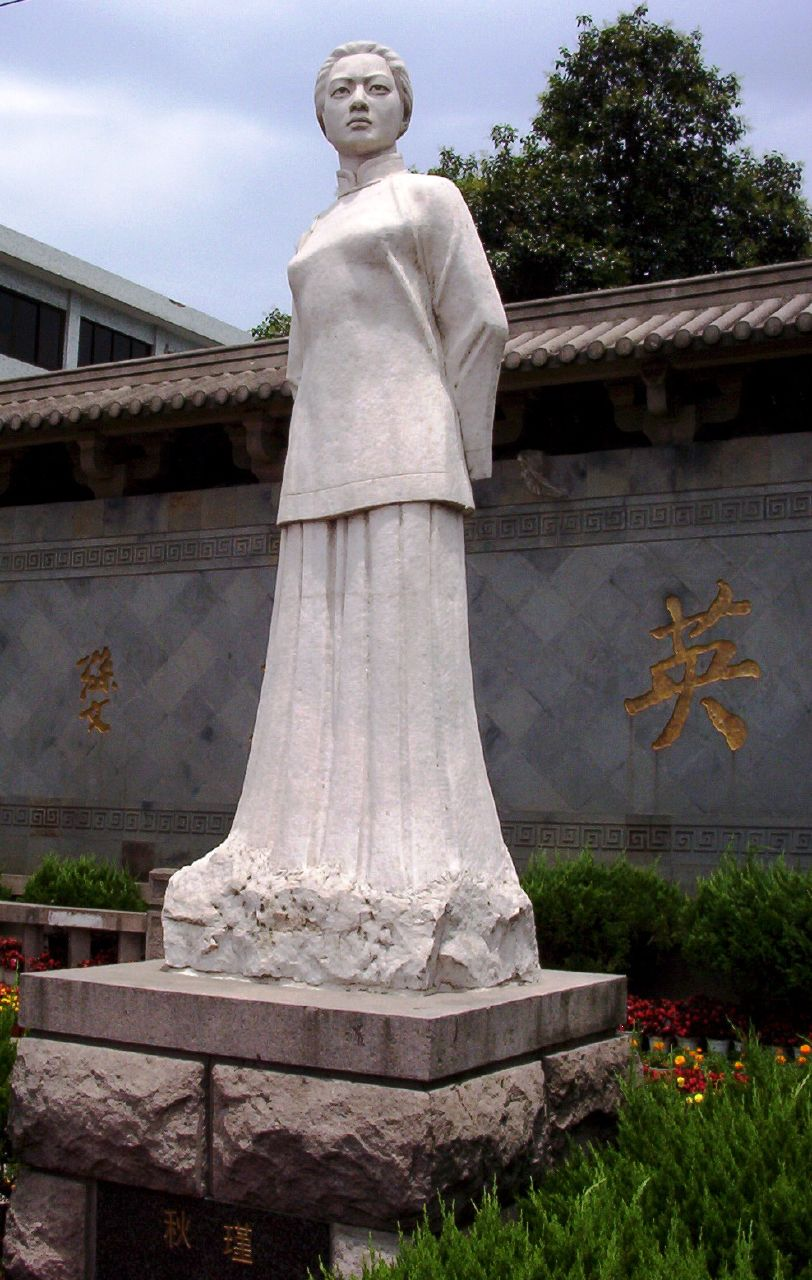
Statue of Qiu Jin

== See also ==
- Feminism in China
