= Iwamura =

Iwamura (written: 岩村 lit. "rock village") is a Japanese surname. Notable people with the surname include:

- Akinori Iwamura, Japanese baseball player
- Kazuo Iwamura, Japanese children's book author
- Noboru Iwamura, Japanese biologist
- Ai Iwamura, Japanese actress
- Iwamura Michitoshi, Meiji era politician
- Shunichi Iwamura (born 1940), Japanese sprint canoeist

== See also ==
- Iwamura Castle in Gifu Prefecture, Japan
- Iwamura, Gifu, former town in Gifu Prefecture, Japan
- 67853 Iwamura, main-belt asteroid
