= Medicine (short story) =

Short story by Lu Xun

"Medicine" (Chinese: 藥; pinyin: Yào) is a short story by Chinese writer Lu Xun (Lu Hsun). Written in 1919, it was published in 1922 as part of Call to Arms, a collection of short stories penned by the writer. The story recounts the tale of Old Chuan and his wife, whose son is dying from tuberculosis. The couple uses the savings from their tea shop to buy a folk medicine cure for their son. Despite their faith in the medicine they procured, it does not work and Little Chuan passes away. The work's overarching themes ask the reader to question themselves in regards to the importance of superstition, as well as to man's constant quest for meaning and control of the circumstances encountered while living in an increasingly complicated world.

One of the revolutionaries who was executed in the story is named "Xia Yu (夏瑜)" and was thought to be mapped to Qiu Jin (秋瑾). "夏 (Summer)" corresponds to "秋 (Autumn)", and "瑾 (Jin)" corresponds to "瑜 (Yu)", and "瑾瑜 (JinYu)" together means beautiful jade, or virtue.

== Background ==
The story is thought to have been influenced by Lu's father, who died in 1896 after being given traditional medicine which Lu Xun had brought to him for years.

== Summary ==
"Medicine" opens with Old Chuan, the owner of a tea shop, waking and leaving his establishment before dawn to purchase medicine for Little Chuan, his son. After walking through the streets as the sun rises, he meets up with a man "[...] clad entirely in black", with whom he trades the silver pieces earned from his tea shop for a roll of steamed bread dripping with blood. As Old Chuan turns away from the figure, clutching the roll, the mysterious man mutters an insult under his breath, which the old man does not hear, too focused on carrying his new purchase home.

When Old Chuan arrives in the tea shop, his wife immediately asks him if he has succeeded in purchasing the coveted medicine for their son. Upon her husband's confirmation, they confer in the kitchen as Little Chuan sits at a table and eats, his body obviously weakened by his illness. Husband and wife then set out to cook the bloodied steamed bread in a lotus leaf, paying no mind to a curious customer who inquires as to the peculiar smell emerging from the oven. Both parents serve the roll to their child and encourage him to eat, insisting that he will be cured after he is done. They wait side by side, looking on almost breathlessly as their son clears his plate, hoping to see sudden signs of recovery. Little Chuan starts to cough again as he feels the gaze of his parents on him; his mother tells him to sleep it off and that he will be better upon waking. She stays with him until he falls asleep before covering him with a blanket and leaving.

The next day, Old Chuan and his wife do their best to serve tea to the numerous customers present within the shop. Despite the dark circles under his eyes, Old Chuan's smile is noticed by some of his patrons. A man enters and reveals that the reason for his happiness is the acquisition of a "guaranteed cure" for his son's ailment: a warm bread roll dipped in the blood of an executed criminal who reportedly engaged in revolutionary activities. All patrons seem to approve of the practice. As the patrons speak of the execution and of Old Chuan's luck in securing the cure, Little Chuan enters to fetch himself a meal. His subsequent coughing fit is almost drowned out by the noise of the conversation until one of the customers notices and tells him to stop coughing—as he has ingested a "guaranteed cure".

An unknown amount of time passes. The wife of Old Chuan walks down the path to a cemetery to visit her son's grave. The cure did not work and he presumably died recently. At the same time, another woman visits a grave right across from Little Chuan's. She is the mother of the executed revolutionary. The two women behold, for a time, a wreath of red and white flowers left on the grave of the executed man. Similar flowers grow on Little Chuan's grave, only they are scarcer and solely white. The mother of the revolutionary cries and asks her son to make a nearby crow fly on his grave as a sign of his presence. The crow stands still. The two women sit together for a certain period of time. Little Chuan's mother eventually urges the other to go, at which point the older woman mutters "what does it mean?".

The crow, which was immobile while the two women grieved, caws and spreads its wings. The two mothers watch as it flies away towards the horizon.

== Themes ==
=== Superstition ===
The short story relies heavily on symbols, namely that of traditional medicine and tradition to condemn the woes of a world that relies on superstitious values rather than embracing the virtues of modernization. To Lu, the persistence of such superstitious traditions is due to of ignorance as well as their persistent use by malevolent charlatans to profit off of this lack of knowledge. The use of the fallen revolutionary's blood to strengthen Little Chuan's weakening body symbolizes an attempt to "preserve vitality"; when the cure fails, it demonstrates that this is not enough to better the woes present in Chinese society. Lu believes that modernization of thought and practices could be achieved through literature. Through the theme of superstition, Lu aims to demonstrate that the only real path to a better future is the one offered by modern medicine and revolutionary thought, rather than tradition.

=== Search for meaning ===
"Medicine" is an investigation of human nature as well as a critique of "Chinese conception of Man". Lu creates characters that are emblematic of the different kinds of individuals he identifies within Chinese society, and explores their respective subjectivities while inquiring as to their conception of the self and their place in modern China. He aims to unearth the implications of the human condition and how it affects these individuals' identities. For the writer, traditional portrayals and conceptions of man are incompatible with modernity. He thus aims to popularize a conception of Man that is viable in modern times. Lu Hsun ultimately views human nature as absurd and as failing to provide any kind of meaning.

=== Cannibalism ===
The consumption of another's blood is reported by the characters of "Medicine" as being able to treat Little Chuan's ills by imbuing him with the fallen revolutionary's life force. Revolutionaries used blood to heal the suffering of society, but the nation healed its own son with the blood of a revolutionary. As a revolutionary writer, Lu used this sad story to cure people's ignorant and numb spirit and thought. The image of the executed prisoner being fed to another is used by Lu to evoke the oppressiveness of Chinese society and its exploitation of the members who are part of its society. It is a sort of state sanctioned instance of cannibalism, where man feeds upon man and stunts the nation's growth. This is why revolutionary ideas are key to Lu: old, traditional institutions are portrayed in this story as feeding on younger, more modern thought processes that are trying to emerge. In order for the nation to grow, antiquated notions (including traditional conceptions of illness and health) must be disposed of and replaced by modern conceptions of being. Lu hoped that people would wake up and embrace the changes of times rather than become numb.

== Legacy ==
While amongst the shortest stories presented in the collection, "Medicine"'s concern with modernizing Chinese thought and conceptions of the world is emblematic of Call to Arms as whole. Lu's stylistic choices–namely his critique of traditional conceptions of man, health, and sickness, as well as the solution he found in modernity–has had a lasting impact on his contemporaries, as well as on later Chinese writers.
