= Hakama =

Type of traditional Japanese trousers/skirt

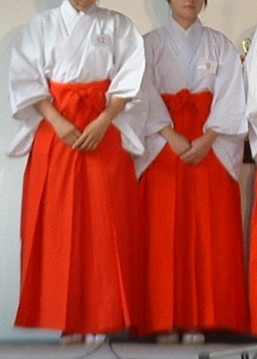
Two Miko wearing hakama

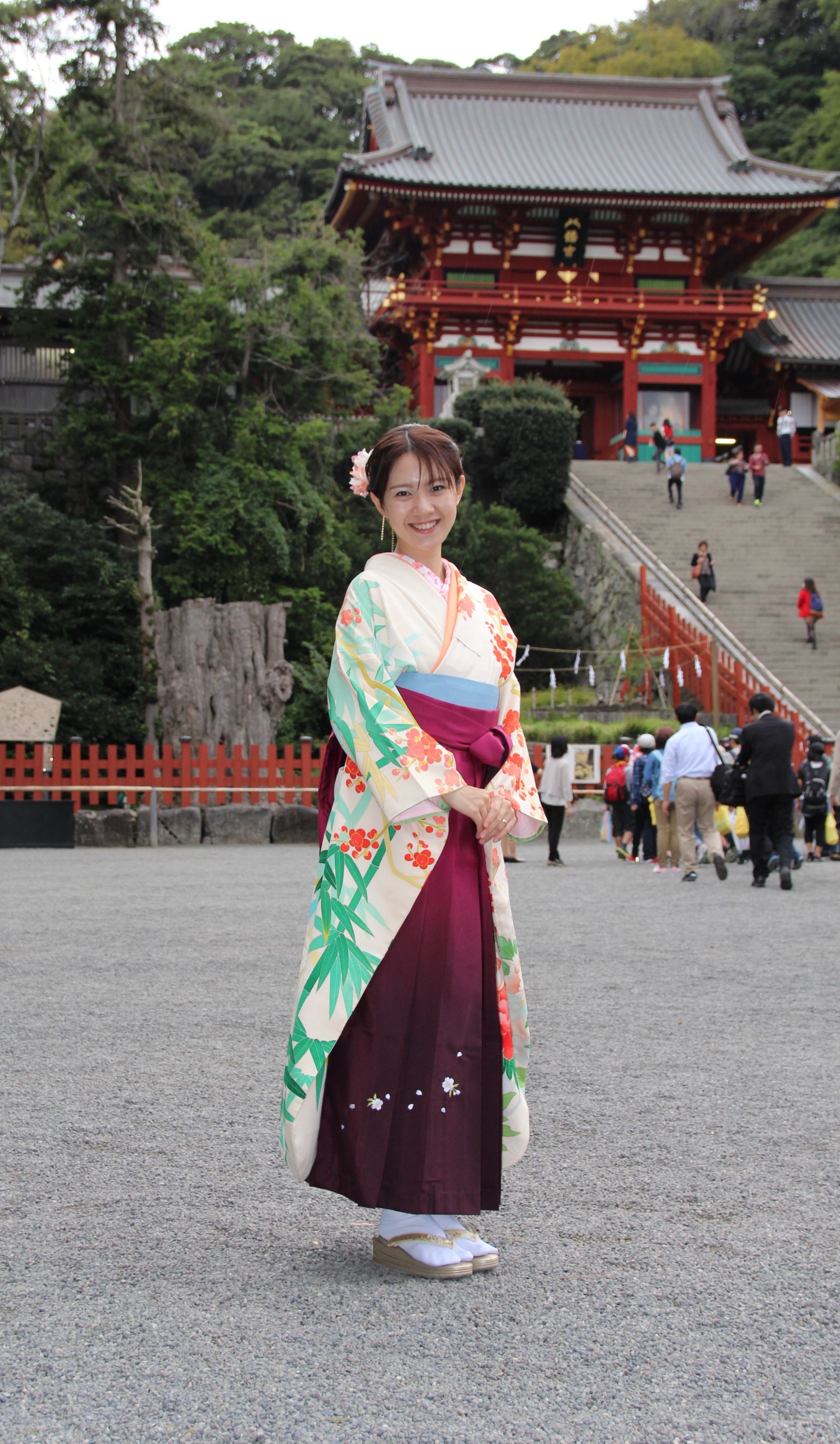
A Japanese woman wearing hakama with a furisode top at Tsurugaoka Hachimangū

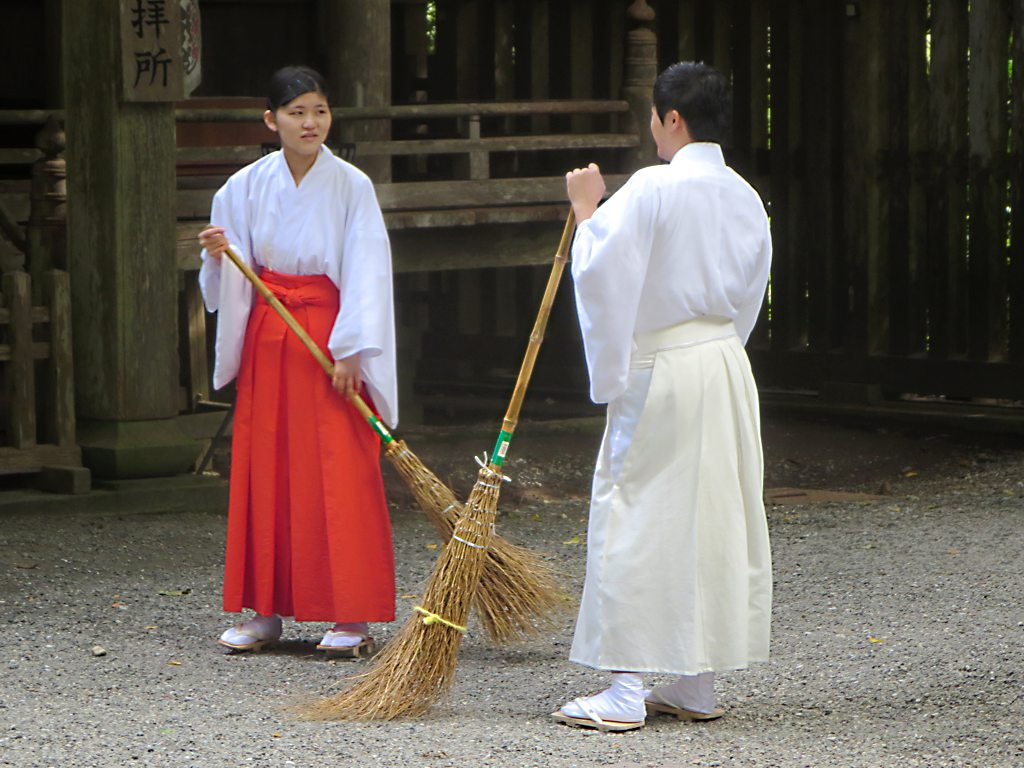
A miko and male priest, both wearing hakama; note the lack of koshi-ita (腰板)

Hakama (袴) are a type of traditional Japanese clothing for the lower body.

Hakama are tied at the waist and fall approximately to the ankles. They are often worn over a kimono called a hakamashita, literally "under the hakama", but can be worn over a regular kimono.

There are two types of hakama: umanori (馬乗り, horse-riding hakama), which are trousers with divided legs, and andon bakama (行灯袴, lantern hakama), which is a undivided skirt style. Both of these types appear similar. A "mountain" or "field" type of umanori hakama was traditionally worn by field or forest workers. These are looser in the waist and narrower in the leg.

Hakama are secured by four straps (himo): two longer himo attached on either side of the front of the garment, and two shorter himo attached on either side of the rear. The rear of the garment may have a rigid trapezoidal section, called a koshi-ita (腰板). Below that on the inside, there may be a hakama-dome (袴止め) (a spoon-shaped component sometimes referred to as a hera), which is tucked into the obi or himo at the rear and helps to keep the hakama in place.

Hakama, especially those for martial arts, may have seven deep pleats, two on the back and five on the front. Although they appear balanced, the arrangement of the front pleats (two to the right, three to the left) is asymmetrical, and as such is an example of asymmetry in Japanese aesthetics.

Historically, a boy would start wearing his first pair of hakama from the age of five, as commemorated in Shichi-Go-San; a similar practice to this, called "breeching", was seen in Europe up until the Victorian era, where boys would from then on start to wear breeches instead of dresses, as a recognition of coming of age.

== Men's hakama ==
While hakama was once a required part of menswear, contemporary Japanese men typically wear hakama only on extremely formal occasions and at tea ceremonies, weddings, and funerals. Hakama are also regularly worn by practitioners of a variety of martial arts, such as kendo, iaido, taidō, aikido, jōdō, ryū-te, and kyūdō. Sumo wrestlers, who do not wear hakama in the context of their art-form, are, however, required to wear traditional Japanese dress whenever they appear in public. As hakama are one of the most important parts of traditional male formal dress, sumo wrestlers are often seen wearing hakama when attending appropriately formal functions.

In addition to martial artists, hakama are part of the everyday attire of priests who maintain and perform services at shrines.

A recent trend among young Japanese men is to wear the hakama as casual day wear with a T-shirt.

Hakama are worn with any kimono except yukata (a light cotton summer kimono generally worn for relaxing, for sleeping, or at festivals or summer outings). While glossy black-and-white striped sendaihira hakama are usually worn with formal kimono, stripes in colours other than black, grey and white are worn with less formal wear. Solid and graduated (ombré) colours are also common. For casual wear, men sometimes wear haori nagashi (kimono with just a haori and no hakama) or kinagashi (kimono alone, as for yukata).

=== Sendaihira hakama ===
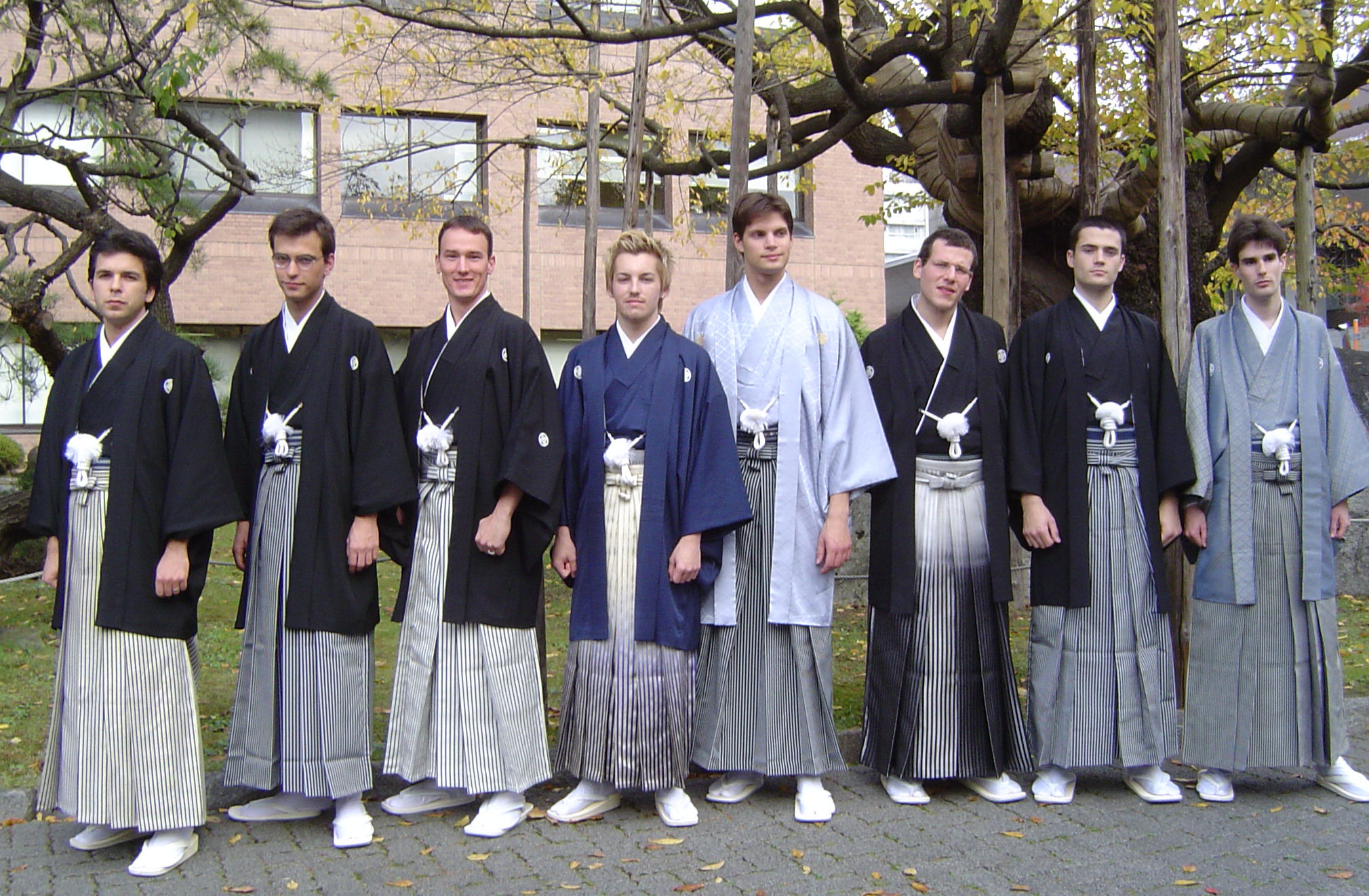
International students in formal montsuki-haori-hakama. Sendaihira hakama, some of them ombré

The most formal type of men's hakama, sendaihira hakama, is made of stiff, striped silk, usually black and white, or black and navy blue. These are worn with black montsuki kimono (kimono with one, three, or five family crests on the back, chest, and shoulders), white tabi (divided-toe socks), white nagajuban (under-kimono) and various types of footwear. In cooler weather, a montsuki haori (long jacket) with a white haori-himo (haori-fastener) completes the outfit.

Traditionally made of silk, sendaihira hakama are sometimes made with blends. Sendaihira is woven with a dense warp. Traditionally, the weft is woven wet and beaten firmly into place to make it denser. The silk strands are not twisted, and are treated with lye. These techniques make the cloth glossy and the pattern very small-scale and precise.

=== Ōguchi-hakama, Uenobakama ===
Both ōguchi-hakama and uenobakama are simultaneously worn with the courtly attire of sokutai (束帯). The ōguchi-hakama (大口袴) are red underpants with a closed crotch, tied at the wearer's left. The uenobakama (表袴), white and with an open fly, is then worn over the ōguchi-hakama, tied off on the right. These hakama designs can be traced to the Nara period.

=== Kamishimo: kataginu and naga-bakama ===
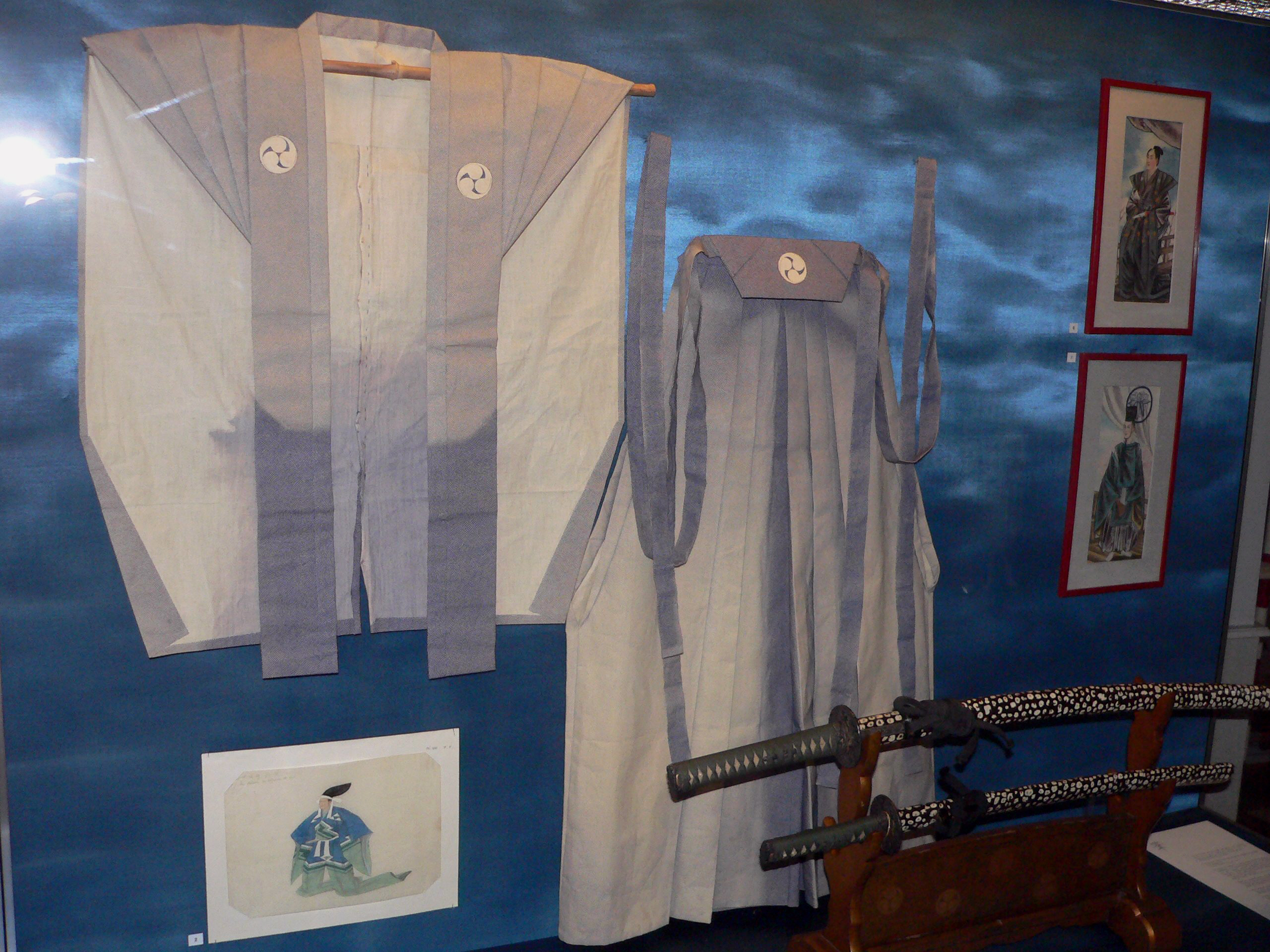
An Edo-period kamishimo ensemble, with the kataginu and kimono on the left and the hakama to the right

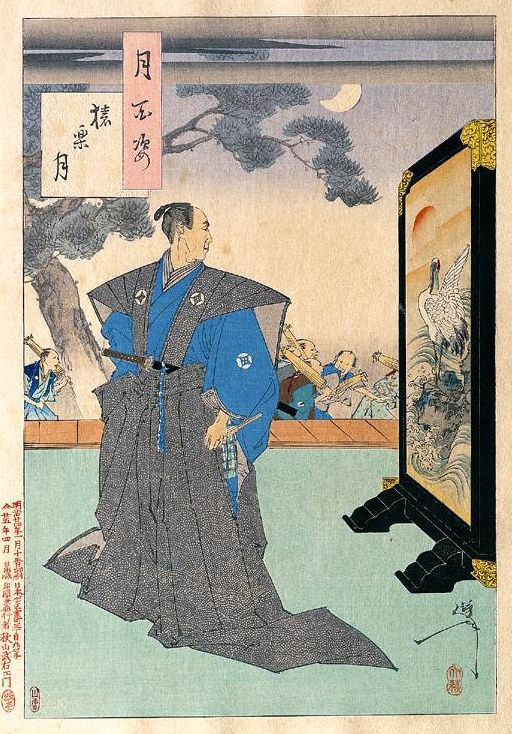
Kataginu with naga-bakama, 1800s court dress

Hakama traditionally formed part of a complete outfit called a kamishimo (上下/裃). Worn by samurai and courtiers during the Edo period, the outfit included a formal kimono, hakama, and a sleeveless jacket with exaggerated shoulders called a kataginu.

Samurai visiting the shōgun and other high-ranking daimyō at court were sometimes required to wear very long hakama called naga-bakama (lit. 'long hakama'). These resemble normal hakama in every way except for their remarkable length in both the front and back, forming a train one or two feet long that impairs normal walking, thereby helping to prevent surprise attacks or assassination attempts. Naga-bakama are now only worn particularly in Noh plays (including kyōgen), kabuki plays, and Shinto rituals.

=== Karusan-bakama ===
Some hakama during the Sengoku period had the hems made narrower than the body in imitation of the ballooning trousers worn by the Portuguese. This style continued into the Edo period and came to be known as karusan-bakama. In addition to the taper, they had a secured band of cloth—looking rather like a pants cuff—sewn around each leg's hem, so the ballooning fabric would not open out like regular hakama. This variety of hakama was also commonly known as tattsuke-hakama.

=== Sashinuki hakama ===
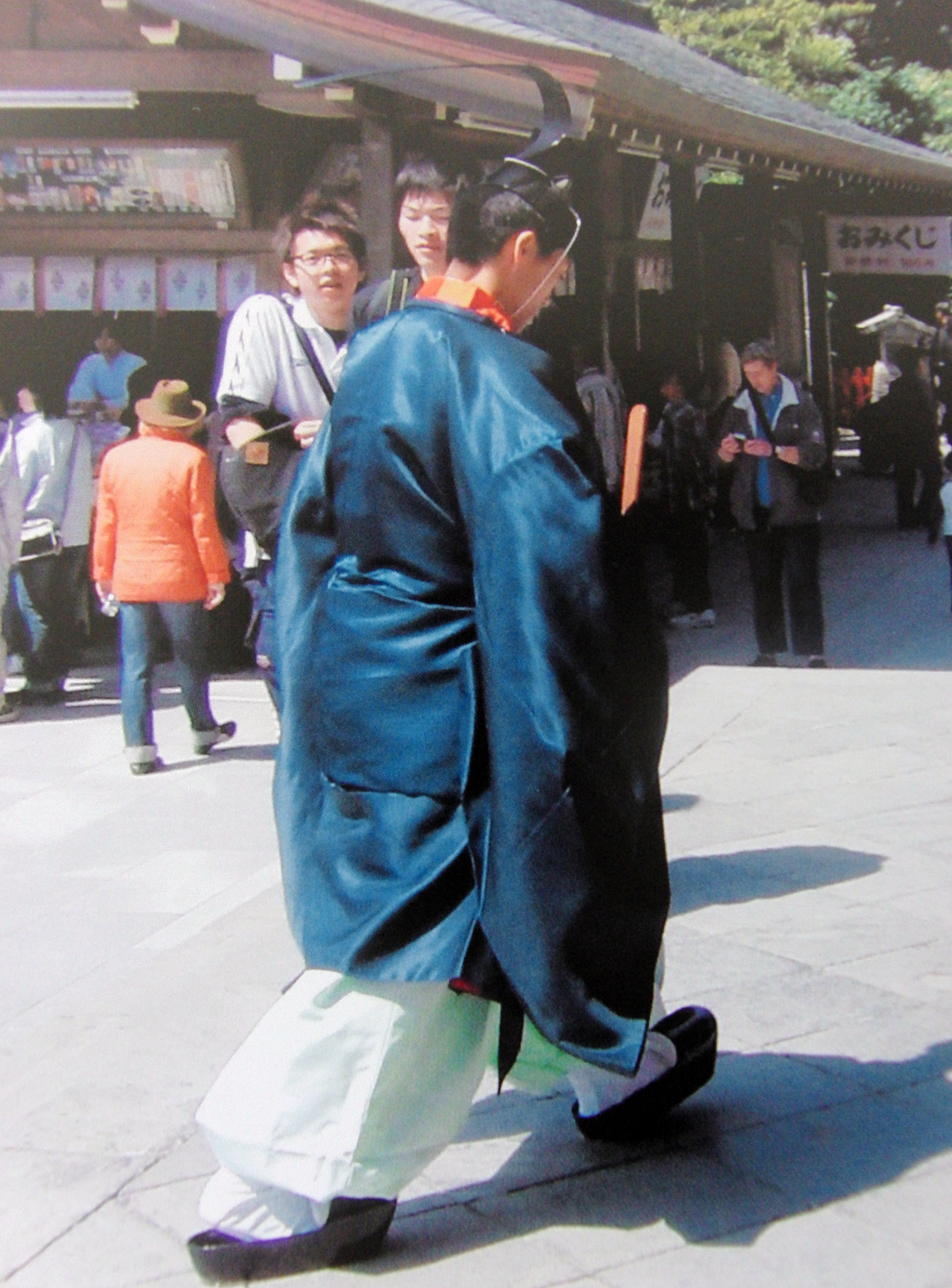
Sashinuki hakama at Meiji Shrine

Sashinuki (指貫), also called nu-bakama, are a type of hakama that are meant to be worn blousing over the leg and exposing the foot. To accomplish this, they are somewhat longer than normal hakama, and a cord is run through the hem and drawn tight, creating a "ballooning" effect. To accommodate the required body, the more formal sashinuki featured six panels rather than four. Technically, this cord around the ankle makes sashinuki a type of kukuri- (tied) hakama. The earliest form of sashinuki was cut like normal hakama and had a cord running through the hem of each leg. These cords were pulled tight and tied off at the ankle. This was the form commonly worn during the Heian period. Sashinuki were worn by court nobles with various types of leisure or semi-formal wear.

=== Yoroi hakama ===
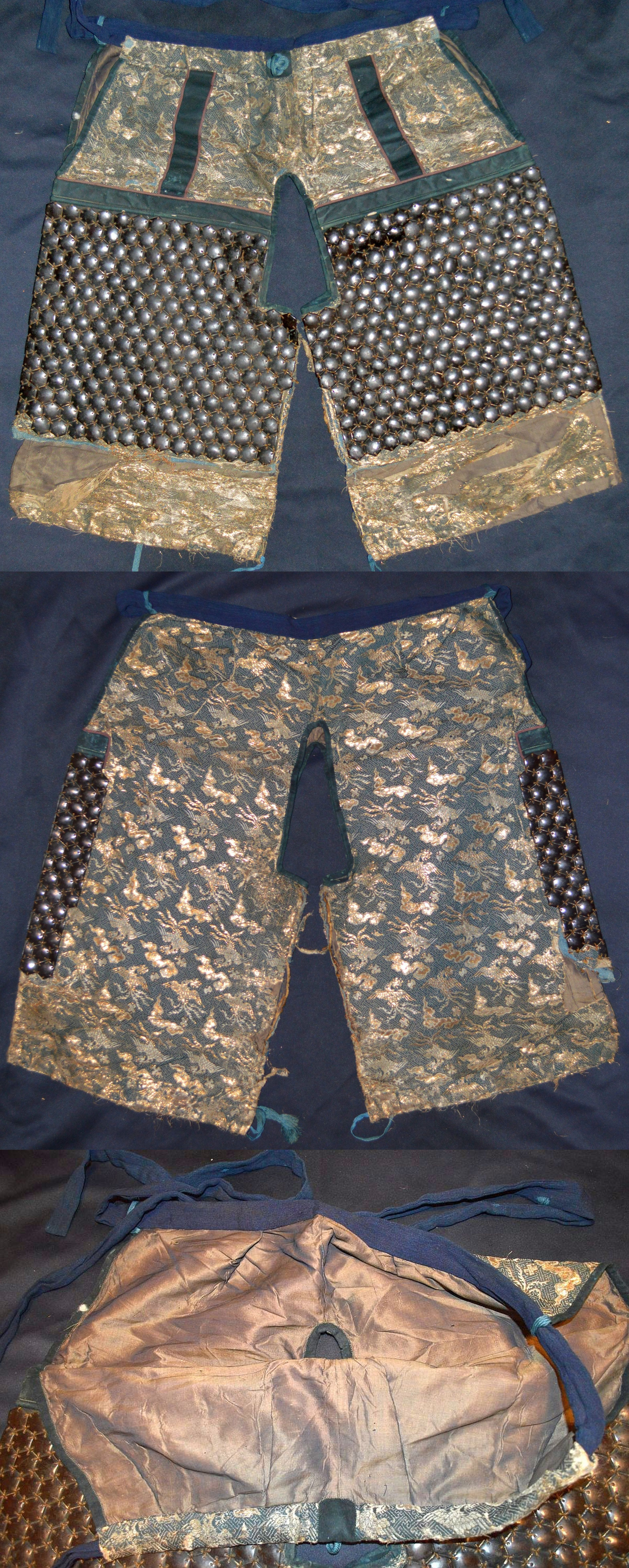
Kikko kobakama, short trousers with kikko armor sewn cloth of the front side, a type of yoroi hakama (armored trousers)

Yoroi hakama (armoured trousers) had small armour plates or mail armour sewn to the cloth of the hakama. Samurai wore them.

== Women's hakama ==
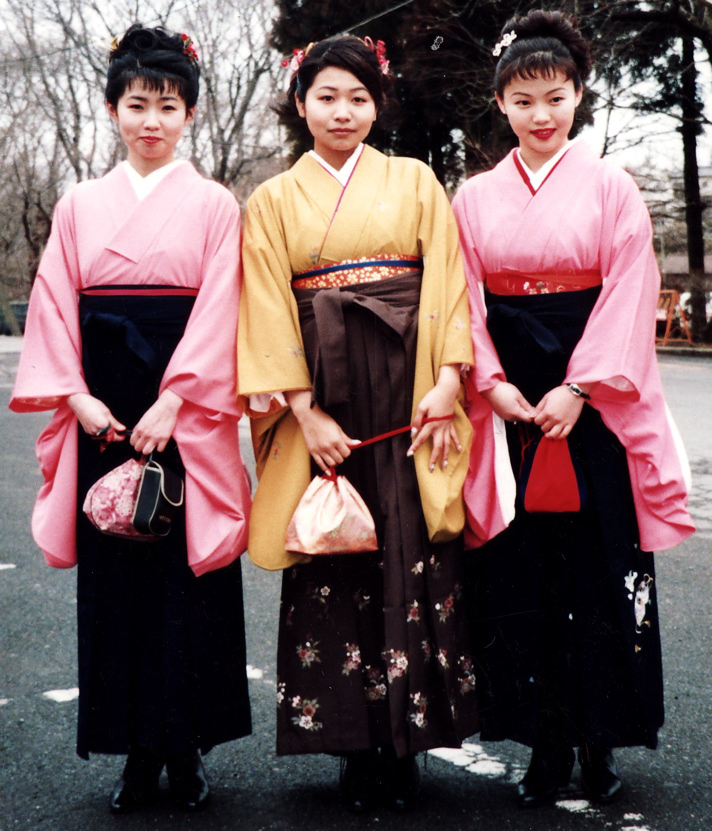
Women at a graduation ceremony, featuring hakama with embroidered flowers

Women's hakama differ from men's in a variety of ways, most notably fabric design and method of tying.

While men's hakama can be worn on both formal and informal occasions, women rarely wear hakama, except at graduation ceremonies and for traditional Japanese sports such as kyūdō, some branches of aikido and kendo. Women do not wear hakama at tea ceremony. The image of women in kimono and hakama are culturally associated with school teachers. Just as university professors in Western countries don their academic caps and gowns when their students graduate, many female school teachers in Japan attend annual graduation ceremonies in traditional kimono with hakama.

Hakama are worn by miko or shrine maidens who assist in maintenance and ceremonies. A miko's uniform consists of a plain white kimono with a bright red hakama, sometimes a red naga-bakama during formal ceremonies. This look stems from the attire worn by high-ranked aristocratic woman in the Heian era, as well as court performers such as shirabyōshi.

While formal men's hakama are made of striped fabric, women's formal hakama are either a solid colour or dyed with graduating hues. Hakama for young women are sometimes sparsely decorated with embroidered flowers such as cherry blossoms. Women typically wear hakama just below the bust line, while men wear them at the waist.

=== Dress reform and scholastic use ===
Hakama have traditionally been worn as school wear. Before the advent of school uniforms in Japan, students wore everyday clothes, which included hakama for men. In the Meiji period (1868–1912) and Taishō period (1912–1926), Western-style wear was adopted for school uniforms, initially for both male and female uniforms. However, at the time, Western women's dress was fairly cumbersome.

Utako Shimoda (1854–1936), a women's activist, educator and dress reformer, found traditional kimono to be too restrictive, preventing women and girls from moving and taking part in physical activities, harming their health. While Western dress was being adopted at the time, she also believed corsets to be restrictive and harmful to women's health. Shimoda had worked as a lady-in-waiting to Empress Shōken from 1871 to 1879. She adapted the clothing worn by ladies-in-waiting at the Japanese imperial court to make a uniform for her Jissen Women's School. During the Meiji period and Taishō period, other women's schools also adopted the hakama. It became standard wear for high schools in Japan, and is still worn for graduation ceremonies.

The image of women in hakama is also culturally associated with school teachers. Just as university professors in Western countries don their academic caps and gowns when their students graduate, many female school teachers in Japan attend annual graduation ceremonies in traditional kimono with hakama.

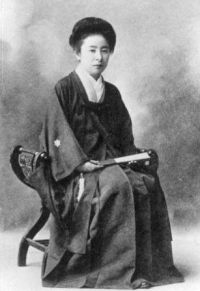
Shimoda Utako, women's activist, educator and dress reform advocate, in hakama

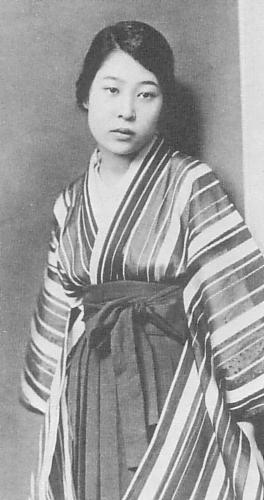
A Taishō-era student

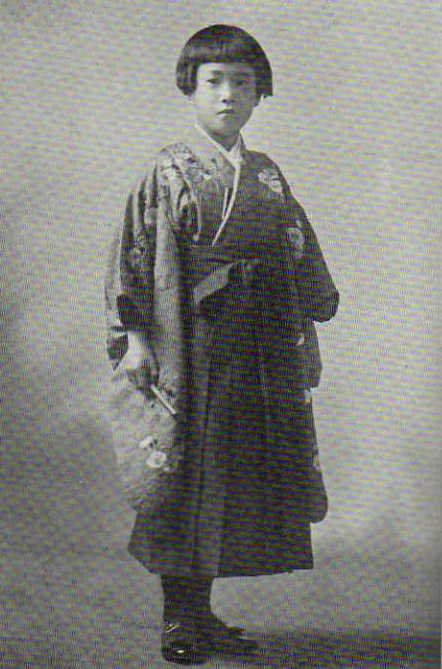
An imperial princess in furisode and hakama

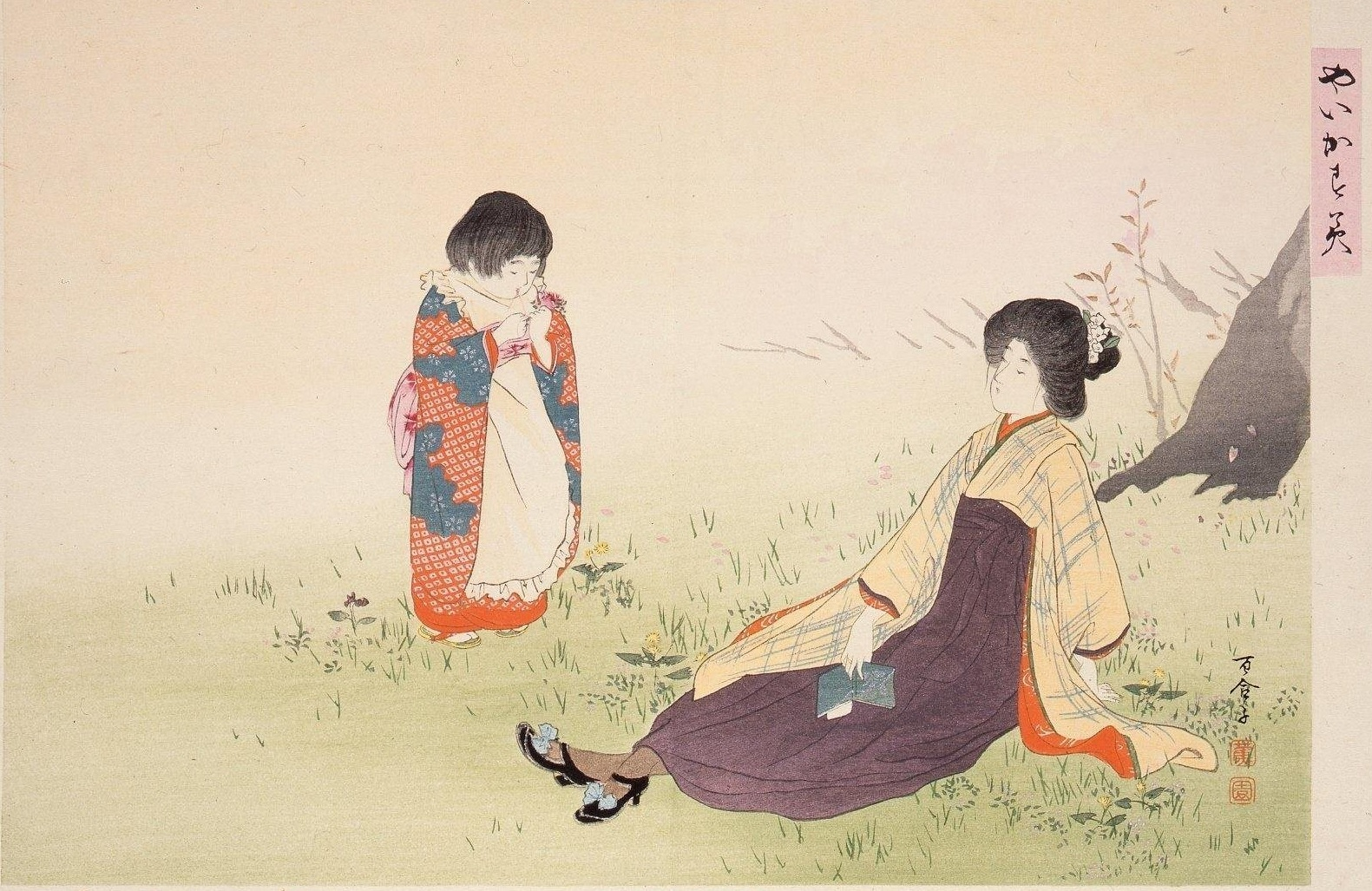
Wearing hakama as reform dress, 1906

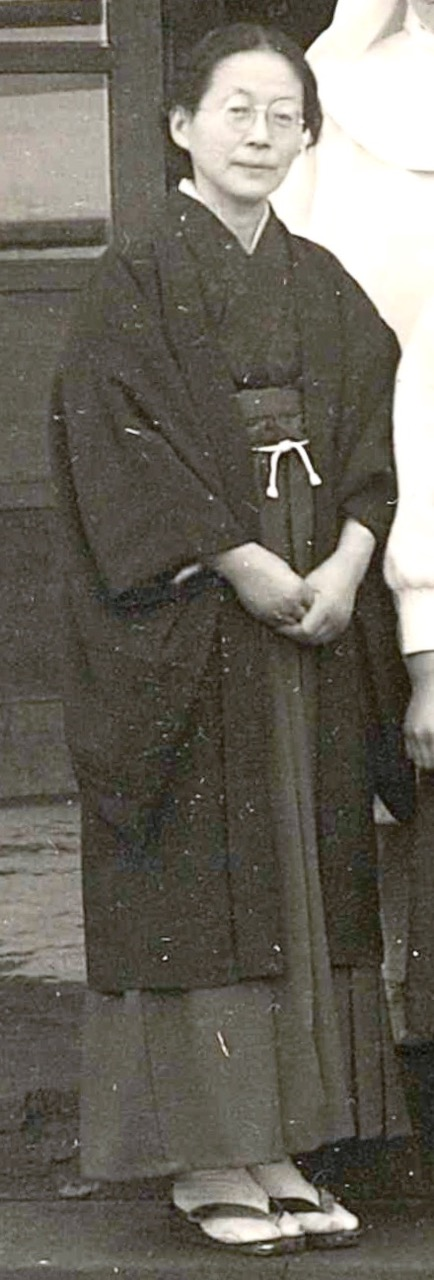
Teacher in 1953

Two students (first and third from the left) wearing hakama over furisode at Waseda University graduation ceremony, 2015

== Tying hakama ==
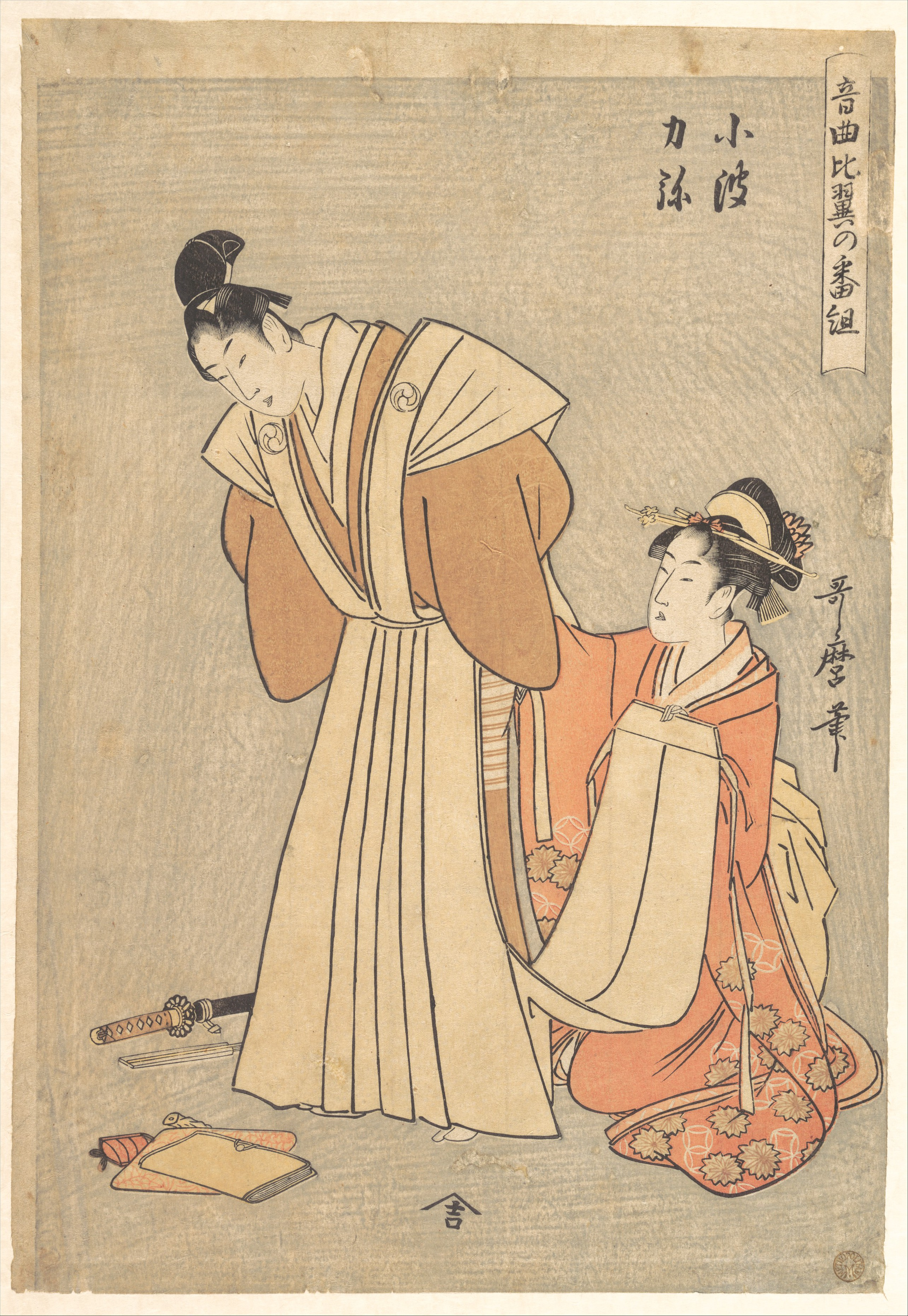
The front panel is tied first (persons: Rikiya and Konami).

There are many ways for men to tie hakama. First, the obi is tied in a special knot (an "under-hakama knot") at the rear. Starting with the front, the ties are brought around the waist and crossed over the top of the knot of the obi. The ties are brought to the front and crossed below the waist, then tied at the back, under the knot of the obi. The hakama-dome is then tucked behind the obi, the koshi-ita is adjusted, and the rear ties brought to the front and tied in a variety of ways. The most formal method results in a knot that resembles two bow-ties in a cross shape.

The method of tying the ties is also different, with women's hakama being tied in a simpler knot or a bow. As with men's hakama, the front ties are first brought to the back, then to the front, then tied at the back in a knot. Then the back himo are brought around to the front. At this point, they may be tied with a bow at the left hip, just in front of the opening, with the ends of the ties at equal lengths. For more secure fastening, the ties may be wrapped once at center front, then tied inside at the back.

== Folding hakama ==
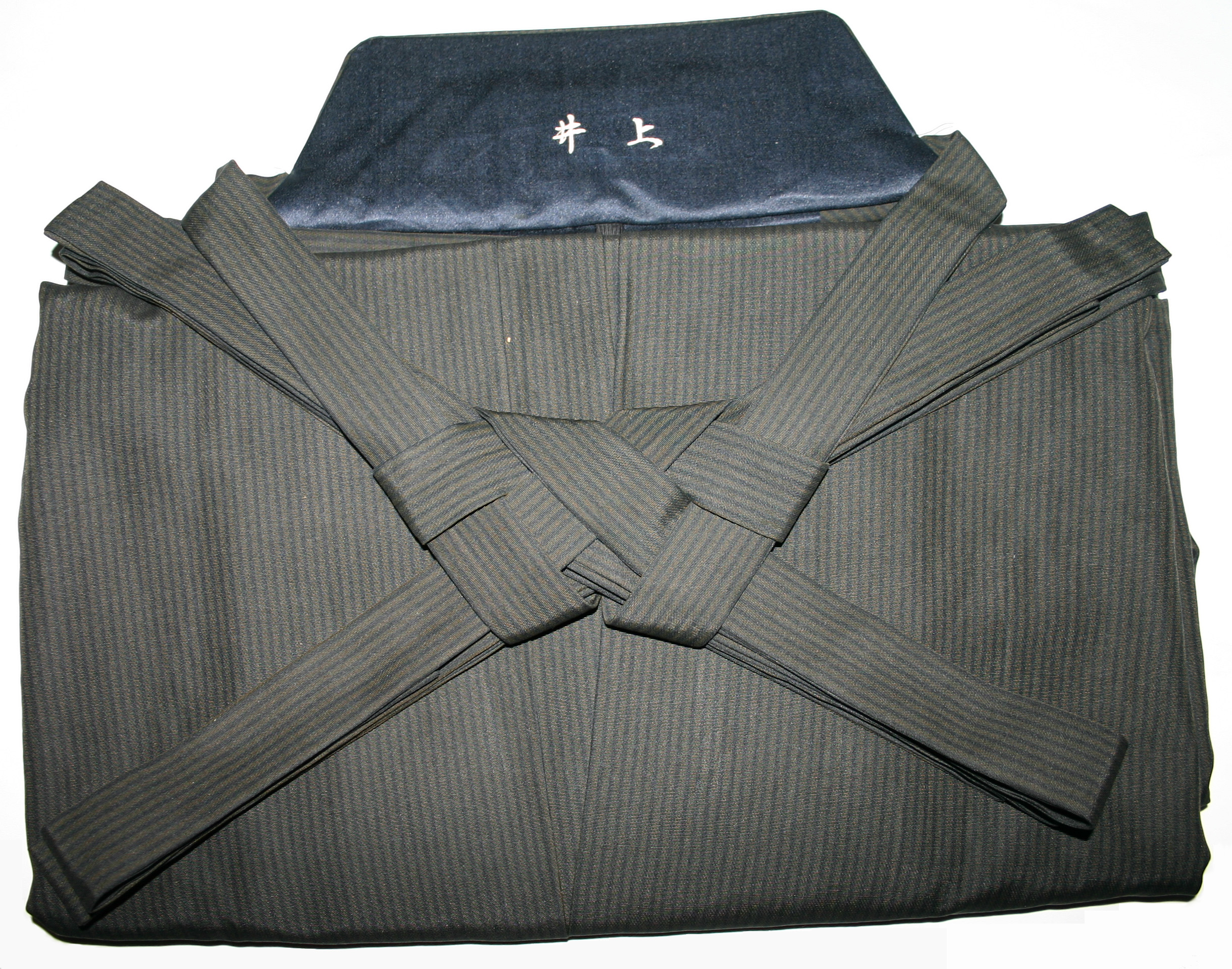
A folded hakama

Like all types of traditional Japanese clothing, it is important to fold and store hakama correctly to prevent damage and prolong the life of the garment, especially those made of silk. With hakama this is particularly important, since hakama have so many pleats which can easily lose their creases; re-creasing the pleats may require specialist attention in extreme cases.

Hakama are often considered particularly challenging to learn to fold properly, in part because of their pleats and in part because their long ties must be correctly smoothed and gathered before being tied in specific patterns.

Various martial arts traditions in which practitioners wear them have prescribed methods of folding the hakama. This is often considered an important part of etiquette.

In some martial arts it is also an old tradition that the highest ranking student has the responsibility to fold the teacher's hakama as a token of respect.

== See also ==
- Bloomers
- Harem pants
- Qun
