= Stott's College =

Private college in Australia

Stott’s College
- Type: Private
- Established: 1883
- Affiliations: Acknowledge Education
- Website: www.acknowledgeeducation.edu.au

Stott's College is a private college in Australia. The primary campuses are located in Melbourne, with other campuses located in Sydney, Perth, Brisbane and Adelaide. The college and its owning company, Acknowledge Education offer courses in engineering design and construction, health, social work and community services, English studies, tourism and hospitality, and VCE Year 11 and 12.

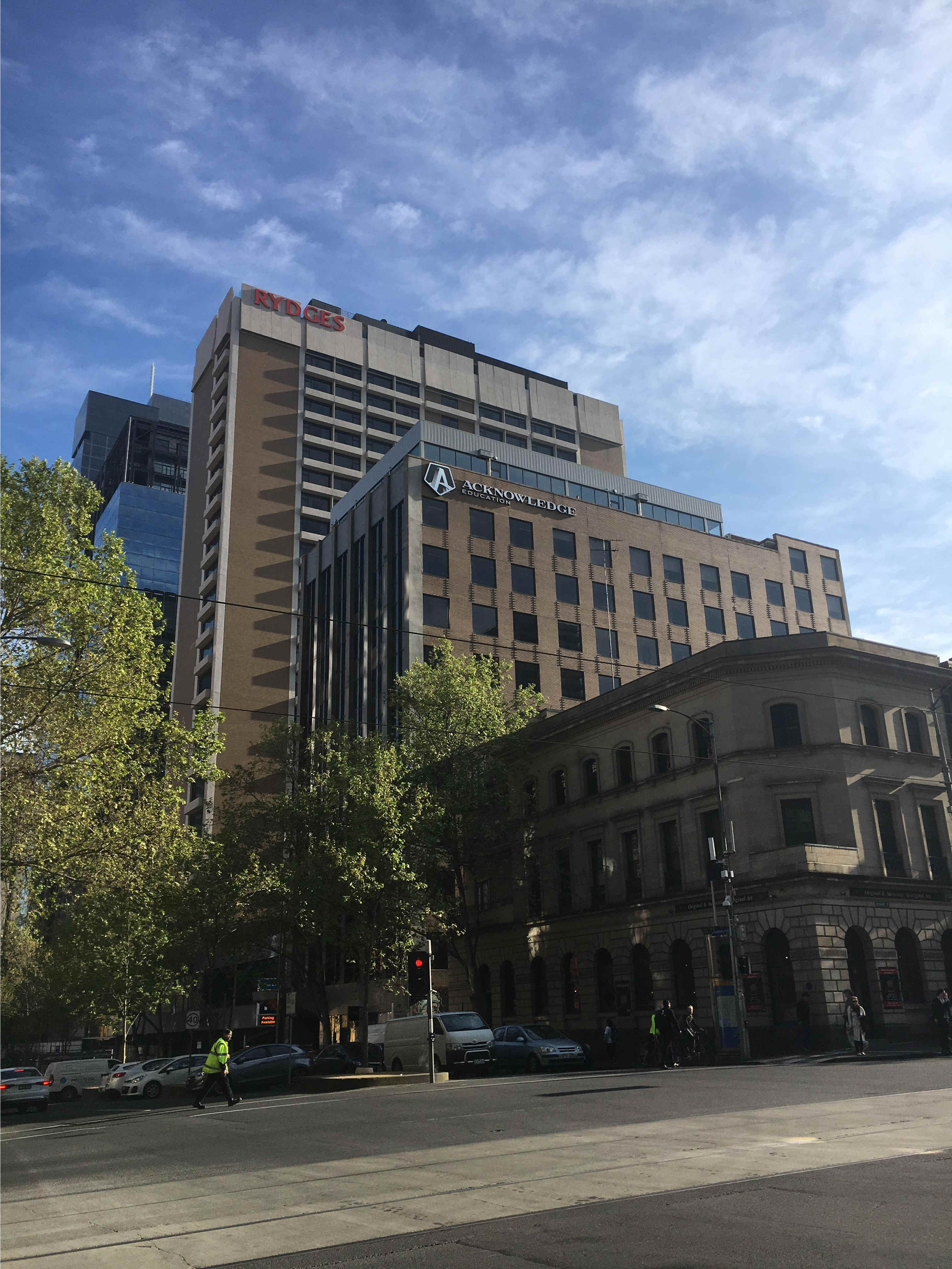
Stott's College Melbourne campus
