= Noboru Iwamura =

Noboru Iwamura (岩村 昇, Iwamura Noboru; May 26, 1927 – November 27, 2005) was a Japanese biologist, medical doctor and professor of medicine. He was the only survivor, amongst eighty high school classmates, of the 1945 Hiroshima bombing. This experience led him to resolve to live his life for others. Under the UMN program, Iwamura was the first Japanese volunteer to arrive in Nepal, a nation struck with a pandemic of tuberculosis. He spent 22 years helping those living in deprivation and his efforts laid the foundation for the establishment of multiple medical facilities around the area.

Back in Japan, Iwamura founded the Peace, Health, and Human Development Foundation in 1980, in an effort to provide technical training to grassroots leaders from Nepal and Southeast Asia. He went on to establish the International Human Resources Institute in 1985, as a means of sponsorship for rural workers to earn master's degrees in Community Development. Dr. Iwamura was awarded the 1993 Ramon Magsaysay Award for Peace and International Understanding in recognition of his life's calling.

Iwamura died from leukemia in 2005. In 1998, the Dr. Iwamura Memorial Hospital and Research Center was established to carry on his name in Bhaktapur.
