= Xu Xilin =

Chinese revolutionary (1873–1907)

- 徐锡麟
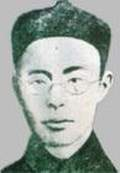
- Born: December 17, 1873; Shaoxin, Zhejiang
- Died: July 7, 1907 (aged 33); Anqing, Anhui

Xu Xilin
- Traditional Chinese: 徐錫麟
- Simplified Chinese: 徐锡麟
Transcriptions
Standard Mandarin
- Hanyu Pinyin: Xú Xílín

Xu Xilin (December 17, 1873 – July 7, 1907) was a Chinese revolutionary born in Dongpu, Shanyin, Shaoxing, Zhejiang during the Qing dynasty.

== Biography ==
Xu was sent to Japan in 1903 for study where he joined other Zhejiang students in rescuing Zhang Taiyan, who was arrested for spreading anti-Qing views. Xu set up a publishing house and a public school called Yuejun in Shaoxing with Zong Nengsu and Wang Ziyu.

Xu was recommended into the China restoration Society, Guangfuhui in 1904 by Cai Yuanpei and Tao Chengzhang in Shanghai. Xu entered the imperial exams and he met his cousin, Qiu Jin. He introduced her into the Guangfuhui.

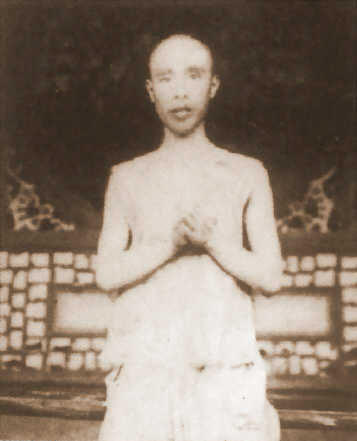
Xu Xilin before his execution

Fan Ainong was a student of Xu.

Xu refused to join Sun Yat-sen's revolutionary league, the Tongmenghui, when his Guangfuhui organization was merged into it.

Xu founded the Datong School with the goal of developing revolutionaries.

In 1906, Xu purchased an official rank and was placed in charge of police HQ of Anqing in Anhui province.

On July 6, 1907, he was arrested before the scheduled Anqing Uprising, part of the Xinhai Revolution. During his interrogation, Xu said he had murdered En Ming, provincial governor of Anhui Province, just because En Ming was a Manchu, and he had a hit list of Manchu officials he was prepared to assassinate, admitting that he hated Manchus in general. He was executed the next day by slow slicing, and his heart and liver were cut out by En Ming's guards for consumption; a week later Qiu Jin was beheaded for her association with the plot. His family including his son Xu Xuewen (1906–1991) were arrested by the Qing. Under Qing law, his son under the age of 16 was supposed to be castrated to become a eunuch and serve in the Qing palace. The Qing was overthrown in 1912 and the castration was not carried out. Xu Xuewen later married a German woman, Maria Henriette Margarete Bordan (1915–2003). They had a daughter together named Xu Naijin (Nancy Zi) (1937 – August 20, 2005) who married Chiang Hsiao-wen, the son of the Republic of China President Chiang Ching-kuo.
