= Jissen Women's University =

Japanese women's university

Coordinates: 35°40′17″N 139°23′23.7″E

- 実践女子大学; じっせんじょしだいがく
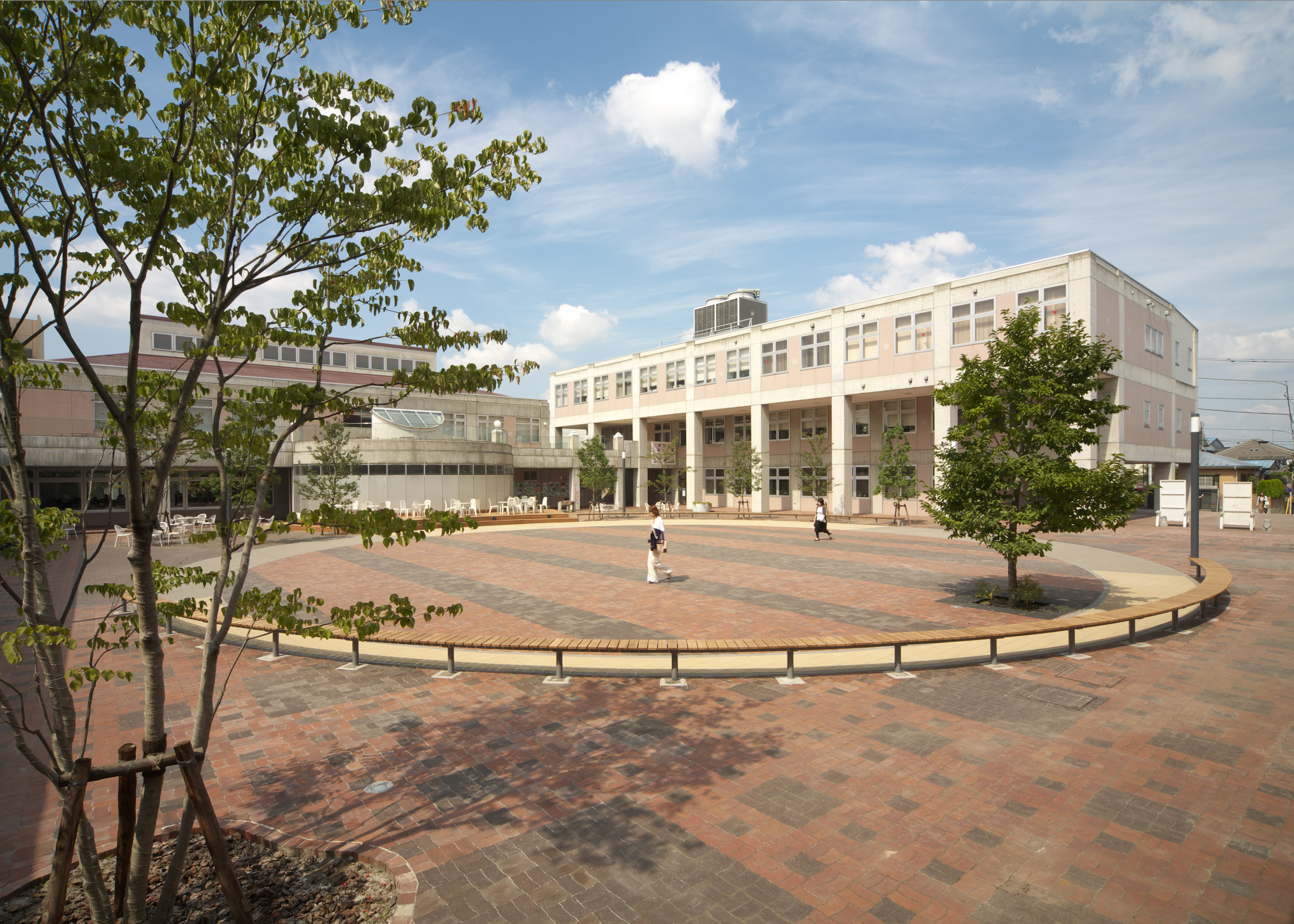
- Jissen Women's University Hino Campus Jissen Women's University (Tokyo) Jissen Women's University (Japan)
- Other names: Jissen; Jitsujo
- Type: Private
- Established: 1899
- Parent institution: Jissen Women's Educational Institute
- Location: 4-1-1 Ōsakaue, Hino City, Tokyo, Japan
- Campus: Hino (Hino City, Tokyo) Shibuya (Shibuya City, Tokyo)
- Website: www.jissen.ac.jp
- Note: This university’s faculties are the Faculty of Humanities, the Faculty of Human Life Science and the Faculty of Human and Social Studies. In addition, its graduate schools are the Graduate School of Humanities, the Graduate School of Human Life Science and the Graduate School of Human and Social Studies.

Jissen Women's University (実践女子大学, Jissen joshi daigaku) is a Japanese private women's college with its headquarters in 4-1-1 Ōsakaue, Hino, Tokyo, Japan. The school was founded by poet and educator Utako Shimoda in 1899. It was chartered as a university in 1949. Its University abbreviations are Jissen (実践, 'Jissen') and Jitsujo (実女, 'Jitsujo').

== Overview ==
=== University as a whole ===
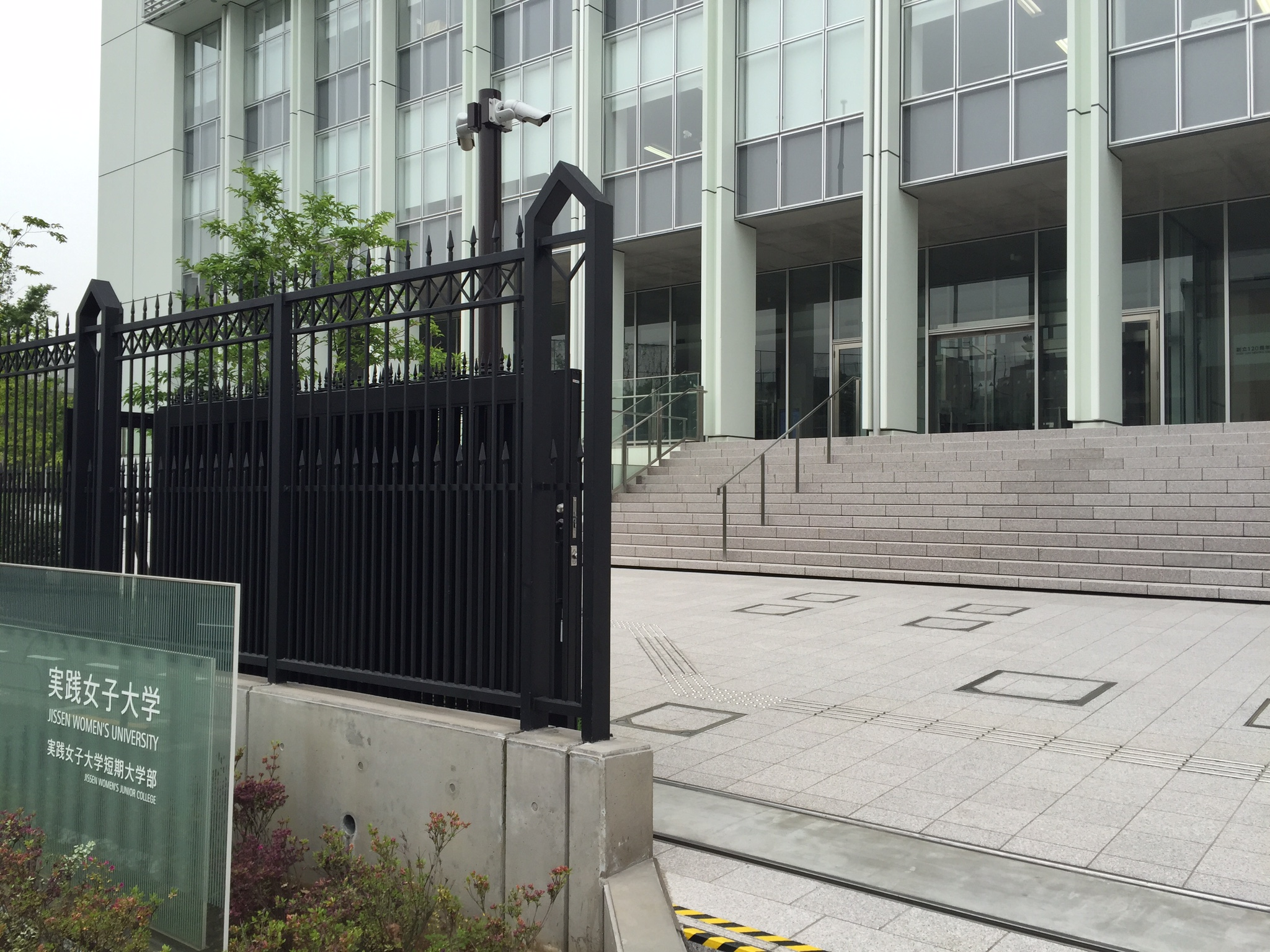
Shibuya campus

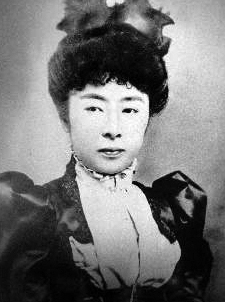
Utako Shimoda

Jissen Women's University views the private women's university "Shimoda School" (later renamed "Tōyō School"), opened by Utako Shimoda in 1882 (Meiji's 15th Year), as its origin. This developed and became Jissen Girls' School in 1899 (Meiji's 32nd Year). In the early days of the school opening, it was located in modern-day Kudan, Chiyoda City, Tokyo, but relocated to Tokiwamatsu in Shibuya in 1901 (Meiji's 34th Year). With the educational system reform, it transitioned to a university under the new system and became Jissen Women's University in 1949 (Shōwa's 24th Year).

In 1986 (Shōwa's 61st Year), it completely relocated from Shibuya to Hino, but Shibuya Campus was opened in 2014 (Heisei's 26th Year). Currently, the Faculty of Humanities, the Faculty of Human and Social Studies and the Junior College are located on Shibuya Campus and the Faculty of Human Life Science is located on Hino Campus.

=== Educational Ideals ===
Nurturing women who are capable of displaying dignity, elegance, independence and self-management.

== Brief history ==
- 1882 (Meiji's 15th Year) Utako Shimoda founds a private girls' school (later changes the name of the school to "Tōyō School") in Kudan, Tokyo.
- 1899 (Meiji's 32nd Year) It founds the private Jissen Girls' School and the Girls' Arts and Crafts School in Kōjimachi, Tokyo as a project of the Imperial Women's Association. Utako Shimoda becomes the first principal.
- 1903 (Meiji's 36th Year) Jissen Girls' School and Girls' Arts and Crafts School relocate to a new school building in the Tokiwamatsu Detached Palace in Shibuya, Tokyo.
- 1925 (Taishō's 14th Year) It establishes Jissen Women's Specialized School.
- 1928 (Shōwa's 3rd Year) It grants the privilege of English Literature secondary-school teacher licenses without examination to specialized faculty English Literature graduates.
- 1945 (Shōwa's 20th Year) Many school buildings are destroyed by fire due to war damage.
- 1949 (Shōwa's 24th Year) It transitions to a university under the new system and establishes Jissen Women's University.
- 1950 (Shōwa's 25th Year) It establishes Jissen Women's Educational Institute Junior College.
- 1986 (Shōwa's 61st Year) The university and graduate school completely relocate to Hino Campus.
- 1995 (Heisei's 7th Year) The Faculty of Home Economics is renamed the Faculty of Human Life Science.
- 2004 (Heisei's 16th Year) It newly establishes the Faculty of Human and Social Studies.
- 2014 (Heisei's 26th Year) The Faculty of Humanities, the Faculty of Human and Social Studies and the Junior College relocate to Shibuya Campus.

== Basic data ==
=== Locations ===
- Hino Campus (Ōsakaue, Hino City, Tokyo)
- Shibuya Campus (Higashi, Shibuya City, Tokyo)

=== Image ===
==== Emblem ====
It has the shape of a cherry blossom.

==== School song ====
- Lyrics: Utako Shimoda, Composition: Kōichi Sawada

== Education and research ==
=== Organization ===
==== Faculties ====
- Faculty of Humanities
  - Department of Japanese Literature
  - Department of English Literature
  - Department of Aesthetics and Art History
- Faculty of Human Life Science
  - Department of Food and Health Science
    - Registered Dietitian Major
    - Food Science Major
    - Health and Nutrition Major
  - Department of Human Environmental Science
  - Department of Life and Culture
    - Life Psychology Major
    - Early Childhood Education Major
  - Department of Contemporary Human Life Science
- Faculty of Human and Social Studies
  - Department of Humanity and Social Science
  - Department of Contemporary Sociology
- Junior college
  - Department of Japanese Communication
  - Department of English Communication

==== Graduate schools ====
- Graduate School of Humanities
  - Japanese Literature Program (Master's and Doctoral Programs)
  - English Literature Program (Master's Program)
  - Aesthetics and Art History Program (Master's and Doctoral Programs)
- Graduate School of Human Life Science
  - Food Science and Nutrition Program (Master's and Doctoral Programs)
  - Human Environmental Science Program (Master's Program)
- Graduate School of Human and Social Studies
  - Humanity and Social Science Program (Master's Program)

=== Education ===
==== On-campus scholarship ====
Jissen Women's University has its own scholarship program, and has reached the point where students can apply for them according on their situation.

Grant-type

- Shimoda Scholarship
- Sakura Scholarship
- University President's Award Scholarship
- Sugako Tonohara Scholarship
- Noboru and Akiko Hayama Scholarship - Noboru Hayama is the founder of Riso Scientific Industries Corporation
- Faculty Scholarships (scholarships aimed at those with sudden changes in household budgets)

Loan-type

- General scholarships
- Emergency Special Scholarship (a scholarship aimed at those with sudden changes in household budgets)
- Emergency loan for school fees (a scholarship aimed at those with sudden changes in household budgets)

== Student life ==
=== School festival ===
- Tokiwa Festival
  A school festival shared by Jissen Women's University and the Junior College. The festival is held in October and November. The name of the Tokiwa Festival derives from "Tokiwamatsu-chō", the old town name of Shibuya, Tokyo, where the school building was located before it relocated to Hino City. Moreover, since the leaves of the evergreen pine tree are always green and do not change colour, it also includes the meaning of permanence.

== University officials and organizations ==
=== University affiliate organizations ===
- Mukōda Library
- Jissen Women's University Supporters' Association

=== List of university officials ===
- List of people at Jissen Women's University

== Facilities ==
=== Campuses ===
==== Hino Campus ====
- Faculty using Hino Campus: Faculty of Human Life Science
- Graduate school using Hino Campus: Graduate School of Human Life Science
- Transportation access
  - 14-minute walk from Hino Station operated by JR East

==== Shibuya Campus ====
- Faculties using Shibuya Campus: Faculty of Humanities, Faculty of Human and Social Studies, Junior College
- Graduate schools using Shibuya Campus: Graduate School of Humanities, Graduate School of Human and Social Studies
- Transportation access
  - 10-minute walk from Shibuya Station operated by JR East, Tōkyū, Keiō Electric Railway and Tokyo Metro Co., Ltd.
  - 12-minute walk from Omotesandō Station operated by Tokyo Metro

== External affairs ==
=== Agreements with other universities ===
- National, academic exchange, etc. partner universities
  - The Open University of Japan
- International, academic exchange, etc. partner universities
  - University of the Fraser Valley (British Columbia, Canada)
  - Dankook University (Yongin, Gyeonggi Province, Korea)
  - Communication University of China (Beijing, China)
  - Dutch National Southern University (Limburg, The Netherlands)

=== Partnerships with companies ===
- Japan Sumo Association (design of merchandise and volunteering at tournaments)

== Notable people ==
- Reiko Matsushita - politician

== Affiliated schools ==
- Jissen Women's Educational Institute Junior and Senior Schools
- Jissen Women's University Junior College

== See also ==
WikiProject Higher education (talk · project cat · project pages · random · edits)

- List of universities in Eastern Japan
