= List of universities in Tokyo =

This is a list of universities in Tokyo, Japan. See also Education in Tokyo.

== National universities ==
- Aeronautical Safety College (administered by Japan Ministry of Land)
- Hitotsubashi University
- Institute of Science Tokyo (former: Tokyo Institute of Technology and Tokyo Medical and Dental University)
- National College of Nursing (administered by Japan Ministry of Health)
- National Fire Fighters' Academy
- National Graduate Institute for Policy Studies
- National Police Academy
- Ochanomizu University
- Tokyo Gakugei University
- Tokyo University of Agriculture and Technology
- Tokyo University of Foreign Studies
- Tokyo University of Marine Science and Technology
- Tokyo University of the Arts
- University of Electro-Communications
- University of Tokyo
- University of Tsukuba, branch campus in Tokyo

== Public universities ==
- Advanced Institute of Industrial Technology
- Tokyo Metropolitan University

== Private universities ==
- Aoyama Gakuin University
- Asia University
- Atomi University
- Bunka Gakuen University
- Bunkyo Gakuin University
- Chuo University
- Daito Bunka University
- Ferris University
- Gakushuin University
- Gakushuin Women's College
- Graduate School of Management, Globis University
- Graduate School of Film Producing
- Hosei University
- Hoshi University
- International Christian University
- International College for Postgraduate Buddhist Studies
- Japan College of Social Work
- Japan Lutheran College
- Japan Professional School of Education
- Japan Women's University
- Japan Women's College of Physical Education
- Jikei University School of Medicine
- Jissen Women's University
- Josai International University in Kioi
- Joshibi University of Art and Design
- Juntendo University
- Kaetsu University
- Kagawa Nutrition University
- Kanazawa Institute of Technology in Toranomon
- Kawamura Gakuen Woman's University
- Keio University
- Keisen University
- Kitasato University
- Kogakuin University
- Kokugakuin University
- Kokushikan University
- Komazawa University
- Komazawa Women's University
- Kunitachi College of Music
- Kyorin University
- Kyoritsu College of Pharmacy
- Kyoritsu Women's University
- Lakeland University Japan
- LCA Institute of Business
- LEC Tokyo Legal Mind University
- Local Autonomy College
- Meiji Gakuin University
- Meiji Pharmaceutical University
- Meiji University
- Meisei University
- Mejiro University
- Musashi University
- Musashino Academia Musicae
- Musashino Art University
- Musashino University
- Nihon Bunka University
- Nihon University
- Nippon Medical School
- Nippon Sport Science University
- Nippon Veterinary and Life Science University
- Nishogakusha University
- Obirin University
- Otsuma Women's University
- Rikkyo University
- Rissho University
- Sanno University
- Seibo College
- Seijo University
- Seikei University
- Seisen University
- Senshu University
- Shibaura Institute of Technology
- Shiraume Gakuen University
- Shirayuri University
- Showa Pharmaceutical University
- Showa University
- Showa Women's University
- Soka University
- Sophia University
- St. Luke's College of Nursing
- Sugino Fashion College
- Surugadai University in Ochanomizu
- Takachiho University
- Takarazuka University Of Art And Design in Shinjuku
- Takushoku University
- Taisho University
- Tama University
- Tama Art University
- Tamagawa University
- Teikyo University
- Temple University Japan (Temple University)
- The Nippon Dental University
- The Japanese Red Cross College of Nursing
- Toho University
- Toho Gakuen School of Music
- Tokai University
- Tokyo City University
- Tokyo College of Music
- Tokyo Denki University
- Tokyo Fuji University
- Tokyo Future University
- Tokyo Health Care University
- Tokyo Jogakkan College
- Tokyo Junshin University
- Tokyo Kasei University
- Tokyo Kasei-Gakuin University
- Tokyo Keizai University
- Tokyo Medical University
- Tokyo Polytechnic University
- Tokyo Seiei College
- Tokyo Seitoku University
- Tokyo Union Theological Seminary
- Tokyo University of Agriculture
- Tokyo University of Pharmacy and Life Sciences
- Tokyo University of Science
- Tokyo University of Technology
- Tokyo Woman's Christian University
- Tokyo Women's College of Physical Education
- Tokyo Women's Medical University
- Tokyo Zokei University
- Toyo University
- Toyo Eiwa University
- Toyo Gakuen University
- Tsuda College
- Ueno Gakuen University
- University of the Sacred Heart
- Wako University
- Waseda University

== Junior colleges ==
- Aikoku Gakuen Junior College
- Aobagakuen Junior College
- Aoyama Women's Junior College
- Asia University Junior College
- Atomi Gakuen Women's Junior College
- Bunka Women's Junior College
- Bunkyo Gakuin Junior College
- Gakushuin Women's Junior College
- Hosen Gakuen Junior College
- Japan Agricultural Cooperatives Junior College
- Jissen Women's Junior College
- Josai University Junior College
- Joshibi Women's university art and design Junior College
- Kaetsu University Junior college Division
- Kagawa Nutrition University Junior College Division
- Kawamura College
- Keio Junior College of Nursing
- Kogyokusha College of Technology
- Kogakuin University Junior College
- Kokusai Junior College
- Komazawa University Junior College
- Komazawa Women's Junior College
- Kyorin Junior College
- Kyoritsu Women's Junior College
- Mejiro University College
- Nippon Sport Science University Junior College
- Otsuma Women's University Junior College Division
- Obirin Junior College
- Sanno University Junior College in Jiyu-Gaoka
- Seibi Gakuen College
- Shiraume Junior College
- Shukutoku Junior College
- Showa Women's University Junior College
- Soka Women's College
- St.Margaret's Junior College
- Sugino Fashion Junior College
- Teikyo Junior College
- Teisei Gakuen Junior College
- The Nippon Dental University College at Tokyo
- Toho Gakuen College of Drama and Music
- Toho Junior College of Music
- Toita Women's Junior College
- Tokai University Junior College
- Tokyo Bunka Junior College
- Tokyo College of Transport Studies
- Tokyo Fuji University Junior College
- Tokyo Kasei University Junior College
- Tokyo Kasei-Gakuin Junior College
- Tokyo Metropolitan College (Public)
- Tokyo Rissho Junior College
- Tokyo Seitoku College
- Tokyo Tanaka College
- Tokyo University of Agriculture Junior College
- Tokyo Women's Junior College of Physical Education
- Toyoko Gakuen Women's College
- Tsurukawa Women's Junior College
- Ueno Gakuen Junior College
- Yamano College of Aesthetics
- Yamawaki Gakuen Junior College
- Yamazaki College of Animal Health Technology
