= General Tests of English Language Proficiency =

English language test for foreigners

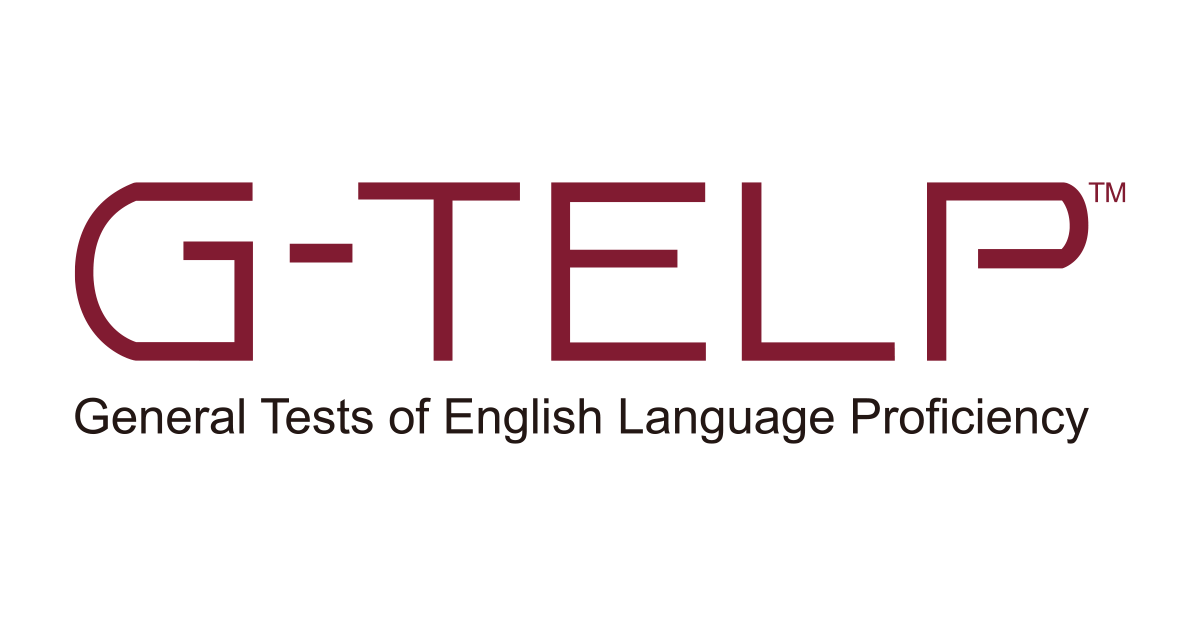
- Acronym: G-TELP
- Type: Internet-based standardized test, Paper-based standardized test
- Administrator: International Testing Services Center
- Skills tested: Reading, listening, speaking and writing of the English language.
- Purpose: To assess the English language proficiency of non-native English speakers.
- Year started: 1985; 41 years ago
- Duration: Level 1: 100 minutes Level 2: 90 minutes Level 3: 80 minutes Level 4: 60 minutes Level 5: 55 minutes
- Score validity: 2 years
- Languages: English
- Website: g-telp.com

General Tests of English Language Proficiency (G-TELP) are English language tests developed by the International Testing Services Center (ITSC) in 1985. They comprehensively evaluate the practical English use ability of test takers who do not speak English as their native language.

There are different forms of the exam: the G-TELP Test consists of areas such as grammar, listening, reading, and vocabulary, totaling a possible score of 99. Additionally, there are the G-TELP Speaking and Writing Tests. The G-TELP Speaking Test is composed of tasks that assess content, grammar, fluency, vocabulary, and pronunciation. The G-TELP Writing Test is composed of tasks that assess grammar, vocabulary, organization, substance, and style. Both assessments use a score scale of Level 1 to Level 11.

== History ==
In 1983, the International Testing Services Center under San Diego State University conducted research on the development of an English proficiency test with professors, linguists, and evaluation experts from the University of California, Los Angeles; Georgetown University; and Lado International College. For about three years after development, feasibility was verified through sample surveys and preliminary test trials in countries around the world, including the United States, China, Japan, and Saudi Arabia. The test officially began in 1985.

ITSC develops, administers, and evaluates G-TELP tests for people of all ages. ITSC is a research-oriented, independent educational measurement and evaluation organization that aims to provide equal educational opportunities to people all over the world.

Currently, tests are being conducted in the United States, China, Japan, Taiwan, Singapore, India, Indonesia, the Philippines, Cambodia, Argentina and Saudi Arabia. San Diego State University, Georgetown University, and Lado International College administered G-TELP as a college admission test.

== International Events ==
- 1988 Seoul Olympics: Designated as the official selection examination for interpreter-guide volunteers by the Seoul Olympic Organizing Committee; conducted comprehensive evaluation, education, and training for all interpreter-guide volunteers.
- 2008 Beijing Olympics: Adopted as the official English assessment test by the Beijing Organizing Committee for the Olympic Games through its designated Language Training Provider (AIFLY); utilized as the English evaluation and training system for Olympic volunteers.
- 2014 Incheon Asian Games: English proficiency examination administered for government officials.

== Characteristics ==
G-TELP test includes the following features:

- The G-TELP is administered by licensed and qualified agents in many countries. The test is a comprehensive English proficiency assessment to measure competence in grammar, listening comprehension, reading comprehension, and vocabulary. It assesses general English language proficiency instead of focusing on merely academic or business contexts, with multiple-choice four-choice questions.
- The G-TELP provides scores quickly. Conveniently, test takers receive the announcement of results within a week of the test date. Score reports provide comprehensive analysis and diagnosis through absolute evaluation.
- The G-TELP is criterion-referenced rather than norm-referenced like other commonly used tests. The criterion-referenced method analyzes the language abilities of individuals beyond simple comparisons. The strengths and weaknesses of each structure and question information type are analyzed and diagnosed in detail. The test enhances educational outcomes by suggesting the learning direction of the examinees.
- The G-TELP Level Test consists of 5 levels, from Level One, the highest level, to Level Five, the lowest. By focusing on a specific level of proficiency, each test achieves more extensive sampling of performance than a single test that assesses multiple levels. Listening skills are emphasized more at the lowest level, Level Five, and reading skills are emphasized more at the highest level.

== Test formats and content ==
The G-TELP is a comprehensive English proficiency assessment that evaluates three areas: grammar, listening, and reading and vocabulary. Each section consists of multiple-choice questions. Scoring follows an absolute evaluation method, and the test is divided into five levels, allowing for proficiency assessment at each level.

Level	Questionnaire Method and Time	Evaluation Standard
Level 1	Listening: 30 questions (about 30 minutes); Reading and Vocabulary: 60 questions (70 minutes)	Able to communicate on an equal basis with foreigners who speak their native language; Able to interpret international conferences
Level 2	Grammar: 26 questions (20 minutes); Listening: 26 questions (about 30 minutes); Reading and Vocabulary: 28 questions (40 minutes)	Able to communicate without difficulty in daily life and business counseling; Able to attend meetings and seminars with foreigners, and study abroad
Level 3	Grammar: 22 questions (20 minutes); Listening: 24 questions (about 20 minutes); Reading and Vocabulary: 24 questions (40 minutes)	Able to travel overseas and simple business trips
Level 4	Grammar: 20 questions (20 minutes); Listening: 20 questions (about 15 minutes); Reading and Vocabulary: 20 questions (25 minutes)	Able to communicate through short sentences of basic vocabulary
Level 5	Grammar: 16 questions (15 minutes); Listening: 16 questions (about 15 minutes); Reading and Vocabulary: 18 questions (25 minutes)	Able to listen and understand daily greetings and introductions

== Test Scores ==
The G-TELP personal score report includes three key components: Overall Proficiency, which indicates whether the examinee has achieved Mastery; Skill Area Scores, which provide individual scores for grammar, listening, reading, and vocabulary; and the Task/Structure Score, which offers a detailed breakdown of performance in specific areas. Additionally, G-TELP Korea, the organization that administers the test, provides comparison scores that link G-TELP score ranges to other standardized English proficiency tests.

== G-TELP Speaking ==
G-TELP Speaking is an internationally recognized English-speaking test developed by evaluation experts of the International Testing Services Center. It assesses grammar, vocabulary, organization, substance, and style. This test takes approximately 30 minutes to complete and consists of about 30 questions. Test takers are grouped into eleven proficiency levels, ranging from Level 1 to Level 11.

== G-TELP Writing ==
G-TELP Writing evaluates the practical English writing skills of non-native English speakers in everyday life. Writing topics of G-TELP are based on real-life scenarios and include tasks, such as responding to letters or inquiries, writing reports, and composing journal entries. The test is designed to help test takers improve composition, expression, and writing style in English. It lasts about 60 minutes and assesses five areas: grammar, vocabulary, organization, substance, and style. Scores range from Level 1 to Level 11.

== G-TELP Business ==
G-TELP Business evaluates the ability to use English in business settings, encompassing business-oriented materials, topics, and situations. The examinee's proficiency is measured through his/her responses to the various work-related situations and conditions presented.

=== G-TELP Business Speaking ===
G-TELP Business Speaking evaluates an examinee's ability to use English to communicate within a business setting. The test includes Basic, Intermediate, and Advanced sections that evaluate proficiency across eleven levels of practical ability. It assesses content, grammar, fluency, vocabulary, and pronunciation. The test takes approximately 35 minutes to complete, consists of about 30 questions, and scores range from Level 1 and Level 11.

=== G-TELP Business Writing ===
G-TELP Business Writing evaluates an examinee's ability to write clearly and effectively in a business setting. The test lasts about 60 minutes and consists of tasks that assess grammar, vocabulary, organization, style, and substance. Scores range from Level 1 to Level 11.

== G-TELP Jr. ==
G-TELP Jr. evaluates the practical English proficiency of elementary and middle school students. It consists of five grades and assesses grammar, listening, reading comprehension, and vocabulary. Scoring is based on an absolute evaluation method.

== Countries ==
This is a global English proficiency evaluation certification test conducted internationally. Test takers can take G-TELP in more than 14 countries.

- South Korea
- China
- Japan
- Taiwan
- India
- Indonesia
- Singapore
- Vietnam
- Philippines
- Cambodia
- Saudi Arabia
- United States of America
- Mexico
- Argentina

== Use of the Test result ==
=== Asia ===
==== South Korea ====
In South Korea, it is used when hiring national civil servants, police officers, maritime police officers, firefighters, military officers, etc. In the case of educational institutions, it is being used as graduation requirements for major universities such as Kyungpook National University, Kyunghee University, Dongguk University, Sungkyunkwan University, Chung-Ang University, Daewon Foreign Languages High School, Korea University, Sogang University Sungbo High School, Yoido Girls High School, Youngnam University and Hanyang University, as well as for language talent selection tests and competitions. CJ Group, LG Group, SK Group, Samsung Group, Shinsegae Group, Mirae Asset Financial Group, Hanwha Group, Hyundai Corporation,3M Korea, BC Card, Daewoo Motors, Inc., DHL Korea, Digital Equipment Korea, Hyundai Shipping, KIA Group Korea Bank, Korea Advanced Institute of Science and Technology, Korea Exchange Bank Credit Card, Kunyoung Group, Kyongki Bank, Kyunghylang Dally Newspaper Inc., LG Electronics Academy, Longterm Credit Bank, Ministry of Agriculture, R.O.K., Ministry of General Affairs, R.O.K., Ministry of Science and Technology, R.O.K., National Assembly, P & G Korea Research Institute, Agricultural Development, Center, R.O.K., Pohang Steel Company Human Resources Development, Center Rochet Electric Co., Samsung General Training Institute, Samsung Human Resources Development Center, Samyang Group Sangyong Group, Seoul Olympic Organizing Committee, Sheraton Walker Hill Hotel, Shilla Hotel, Shinhan Bank, Sunkyong Group, Swiss Grand Hotel, etc. are using it for recruitment and promotion of new employees.

In the case of Gwangju Metropolitan City, Gwacheon, Gunpo, Gimpo, Ansan, Anyang, and Pocheon, local governments themselves are implementing a policy to support the test fee for young people living in the area.

==== China ====
In China, it was used as a system to evaluate the communication skills of hotel and lodging establishments in the China National Tourism Administration, [21] and is being used at the government level, such as being used for the 2008 Summer Olympics Organizing Committee's English Language Proficiency Test and Volunteer Selection Test. Also it was used Beijing Second College, Ladder College at East China Normal University, Shanghai National Tourism Administration, Department of Personnel and Education, Beijing, P.R.C., Shanghai Examination Authority, Shanghai Municipal and Government.

==== Japan ====
In Japan, it is used at Tokyo Metropolitan University, Keio University, Nihon University, Kagoshima University, Tokyo Seitoku University, Tokyo City University, Tokyo University of Agriculture, Nihon University, Fukuoka Prefectural University, Hokkai Gakuen University, and Nagasaki University.

Also it is used at Aichi Gakuin Junior College, Atomi Junior College, AYUSA International Japan, Baika College, Baiko Gakuin Women's Junior College, Biwako Seikel Sports University, Chuo University, Doshisya University, Eiti University, Fukuoka International University, Future University, Hakodate, Gakushuin University, Gakushuin Women's College, Helan Jogakuin University, Hiroshima Kokusai Gakuin University Hiroshima Syudo University, Hokkaido College of Pharmacy, Hokkaido University of Education, Iwamisawa, Hyogo University of Teacher Education, Ibaraki University, Ikuei Women's College, International Buddhist University Jumonji Gakuen Women's College, Jumonji Gakuen Women's University, Kansai International University Kansai University of International Studies, Kanto Gakuin University, Kawarnura Gakuen Woman's University, Keio Gijuku University Keisen University, Kinjo Gakuin University, Kinran College, Kobe City College of Nursing, Kobe International University, Kobe Jogakuin College, Kobe Shinwa Women's UniversityKokusai Aviation College, Konan Women's University, Kove Shinwa Women's University, Kumamoto University, Kyoei University, Kyoto Gakuen University, Kyoto Koka Women's University, Kyoto Seika University, Kyoto Tachibana Women's University, Kyushu Institute of Technology, Meikai University, Meisei University, Mukogawa Women's College, Musashino Women's University, Nagaoka University of Technology, Nagasaki Wesleyan University, Nagoya Gakuin University Nagoya Keizai University, National Institute of Fitness and Sports in Kanoya, Neopt College, Nihon College, Nihon University, Nippon Institute of Technology, Notre Dame Women's College of Kyoto, Oita Tomei High School, Osaka Aoyama College, Osaka Chiyoda Junior College, Osaka City University, Osaka Economic University, Osaka International University, Osaka Sangyo University, Osaka Seikei College, Osaka Seikei University, Osaka Seikei Women's College, Osaka Shoin Women's University, Osaka University of Arts Junior College, Otani Junior College Otemae University, Otemon Gakuin University, Otsuma Women's University, Ritsumeikan University, Sagami Women's College, Saitama Medical School, Saitama Prefectual University, Saniku Gakuin College, Sanyo Gakuen University, Sapientia University, Sapporo International Junior College, Seibold University of Nagasaki, Seijo University, Senshu University, Shobi Gakuen University, Shobi University, Showa Pharmaceutical University, Sugiyama Jogakuen University, Takachiho University, Takasaki City University of Economics, Takasaki University of Commerce, Takushoku University, Tensi University, Tezukayama University, Toho University, Tohoku Institute of Technology Toin University of Yokohama, Toita Women's College, Tokiwakai Gakuen University, Tokiwakai University, Tokyo Christian University, Tokyo Kasei Gakuin Women's University, Tokyo Seitoku University, Tokyo Toritu University, Tokyo University of Agriculture, Tokyo University, TOP English Schools, Tottori University of Environmental Studies, Toyama Prefectual College, Tsukuba International University, University of Marketing and Distribution Science, Wakayama Shinai Women's College, Wako University, Wayo Women's University, and Yamanashi College of Nursing

==== Taiwan ====
In Taiwan, it is being used at National Tainan University, Taipei National University of Arts, Chern Gong High School, Chiang Shu High School Chung Shan High School, Keelung Girls High School, Ming Tao High School, San Hsin High School Shing Ming High School, Tainan Junior High School of Home Economics, Taipei First Girls High School Taipei National College of Business, Wen Tzao Junior College, URUGUAY, Victoria College Western Road, YES., and Chinese Culture University.

=== America ===
==== United States ====
In United States, it is used as a qualification for official language proficiency in the Korean-American college student training program also known as WEST, American Language Institute, San Diego State University, AYUSA International USA, California State University, Los Angeles, Georgetown University, National Education Corporation, Spartan School of Aeronautics, University of Delaware, University of South Florida

==== Canada ====
In Canada, it is used when selecting exchange students at the University of Victoria.

==== Argentina ====
In Argentina, it is used at Academia Argentina School, Asociación Educativa Pío León, Buenos Aires English centre, centro educativo latinoamericano, Academia de Inglés Juan XXIII, Argentina School, Asociación Educativa Pio León, Asociación Puntana Eva Perón, B. H. Mondos, Bridge English, Buenos Aires English Centre (B.A.E.), Centro de Inglés Americano, Centro Educativo Latinoamericano, Colegio Alemán, Colegio Aula XXI, Colegio Goyena, Colegio Manuel Belgrano, Colegio North Hills, Colegio Pellegrini, Colegio San Pedro Apóstol, Colegio Sarmiento, Colegio Schönthal, Colegio Siglo XXI, Columbia School, Compu-English, CR Language School, Cultural Inglesa Oxford, Dover High School, English Institute, Escuela Agropecuaria, Escuela Arco Iris, Escuela de Capacitación N° 10 "Raúl Scalabrini Ortiz, Escuela de Lenguas (Facultad de Humanidades y Ciencias de la Educación de la Universidad Nacional de La Plata), Escuela del Sol, Escuelas Técnicas ORT 1, Escuelas Técnicas ORT 2, Ideas Institute Network, IICANA IICANA (Filial La Rioja), IICANA (Nuestra Señora del Carmen), Instituto Dialogue, Instituto Británico., Instituto Cardoso, Instituto Corazón de María, Instituto Newman, Instituto Saint Michael's, instituto Saint Thomas More, Instituto William Blake, Instituto Windsor, L.E.A. Institute, Landmark, Language Classroom, Language Network, Lincoln Institute, Link, Lugano English Institute, New Model International School, Pravia English Teaching Studio, Princeton School, Proyecto 3, Salem, St. John's School, T. S. Eliot Bilingual Studies, Thomas Jefferson College, Traductorado Superior "Lenguas Vivas" and Unidad Educativa Maryland.

==== Mexico ====
In Mexico, it is used at Banco Nacional de Comercio Exterior (BANCOMEX), Banco Nacional de México (BANAMEX), CETAC, Mexicali Universidad de Guadalajara, General Electric de México, S. A., Instituto de Lenguas Extranjeras ILE, Instituto Politécnico Nacional, Subsecretaria de Educación e Investigación Tecnológicas de México (SEIT, national adoption of G-TELP for all university-level Institutos Tecnológicos and all CECATI and vocational centers)

=== Europe ===
==== United Kingdom ====
In United Kingdom, it is used as a qualification for the official language proficiency of a working holiday visa.

== See also ==
- International English Language Testing System (IELTS)
- Test of English Proficiency (South Korea) (TEPS)
- Test of English for International Communication (TOEIC)
- Test of English as a Foreign Language (TOEFL)
