= Tokyo Woman's Christian University =

University in Tokyo, Japan

- 東京女子大学; Tōkyō Joshi Daigaku
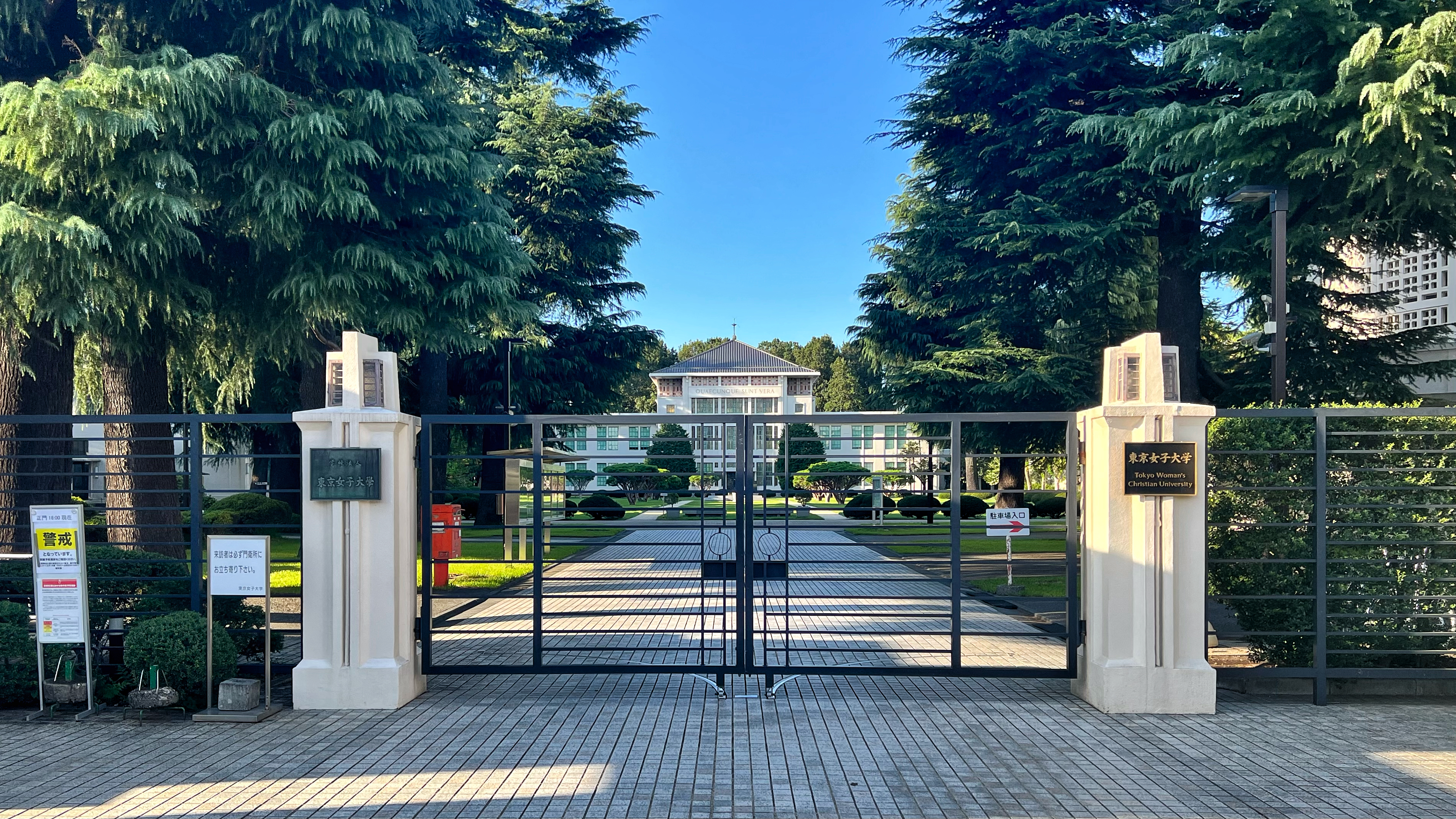
- The front gate of Tokyo Woman's Christian University
- Motto: Quaecunque Sunt Vera
- Motto in English: Whatsoever Things Are True
- Type: Private
- Established: 1918
- President: Shoko Ono
- Location: Tokyo, Japan; 35°42′40″N 139°35′25″E
- Website: https://www.twcu.ac.jp/main/english/index.html

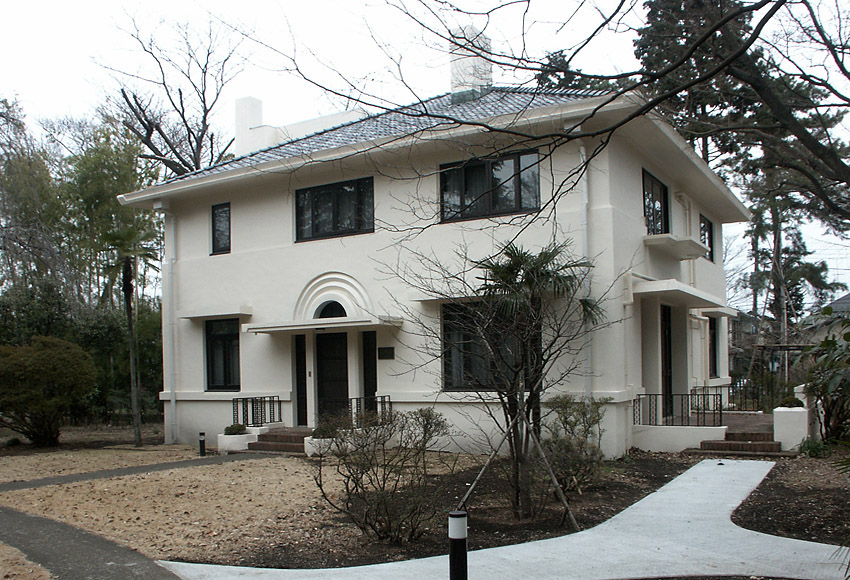
Reischauer House on the campus of Tokyo Woman's Christian University in Suginami, Tokyo

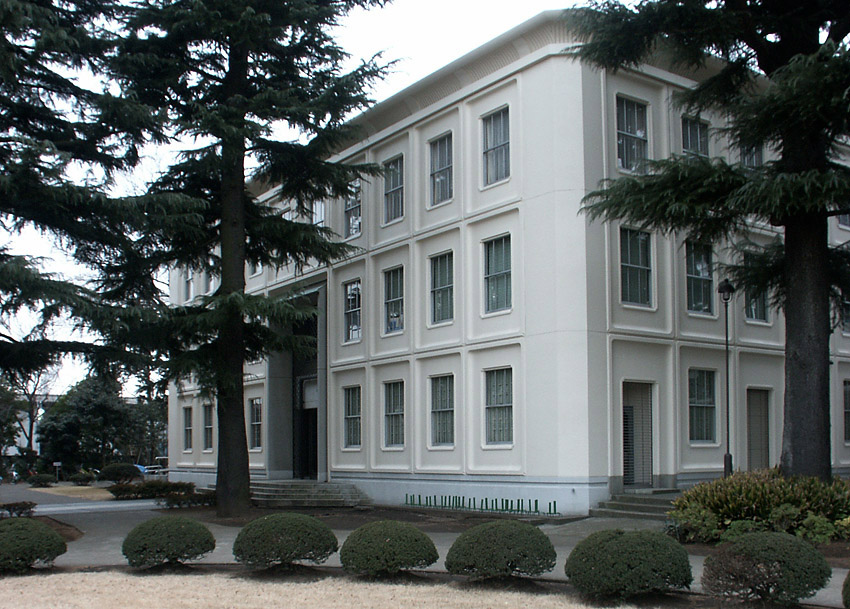
Administration building on the same campus

Tokyo Woman's Christian University (東京女子大学, Tōkyō Joshi Daigaku), often abbreviated to TWCU or Tonjo (東女, Tonjo), is an independent Protestant university in Tokyo, Japan.

== Founding ==
TWCU was established by Nitobe Inazō (1862–1933), an author, diplomat and educator, who was appointed as the first president in 1918. The first classes were held in Tsunohazu. In the 1880s, while Nitobe was a student at Johns Hopkins University in the United States, he became a member of the Religious Society of Friends (Quakers). The Quaker philosophy gave him a strong faith that Japanese women should be provided educational opportunities. Together with A.K. Reischauer (father of Edwin O. Reischauer) and Tetsu Yasui, he was dedicated to the foundation of Tokyo Woman's Christian University.

== Campus ==
The original TWCU campus in Iogi-mura, Toyotama-gun, to which the university moved in 1924, was built in the 1920s and is very significant architecturally. It was designed by Antonin Raymond who came to Tokyo with Frank Lloyd Wright to build the famous Imperial Hotel. The university includes seven registered tangible cultural properties, including the main building. In addition to TWCU's beautiful garden, the campus includes open spaces and a small forest behind the main building. In the forest, there are various plants such as plum trees, cherry trees, dogwood trees and tall pine trees, as well as raccoon dogs and many crows. Although the campus is in an urban area, it is unusually green and spacious.

The Nitobe Memorial Room is in the main building. It contains documents and photographs to explain the history and the philosophy of the university. The chapel has colorful stained glass and a pipe organ. In the morning, there is worship every day. The auditorium is used for the entrance ceremony, the university festival and the graduation ceremony. The Reischauer House, in which Dr. A.K. Reischauer lived with his family, is a registered tangible cultural property. It is built in western style architecture and has a romantic atmosphere. Building No. 23 is the most recent building and was completed in 2009. It is the tallest building in the campus. There is a wooden deck and terraces in the building and on a clear day, Mount Fuji and Tokyo Tower are visible from the top floor.

== Academics ==
TWCU has one faculty divided into twelve departments in which undergraduates can major. The biggest department was the Department of Literature and Culture in English. This department enrolls approximately 640 students. The smallest is the Department of Philosophy which has about 160 students. In 2018, the departments of the university will undergo restructuring.

Department of International English

- Department of International English (the Department of Literature and Culture in English and the Department of Language Science will merge into the new Department of International English)

Department of Humanities

- Department of Philosophy
- Department of Japanese Literature
- Department of History and Culture (formerly the Department of History)

Department of International Society

- Department of International Relations
- Department of Economics
- Department of Sociology
- Department of Community Planning (newly established department)

Department of Psychology and Communication

- Department of Psychology
- Department of Communication

Department of Mathematical Science

- Department of Mathematics
- Department of Information Sciences

TWCU provides a strong liberal arts education leading to a bachelor's degree. Students can make a curriculum from various fields, not only from their own major.

Master's degree programs and doctoral degree programs are offered in the Graduate School.

== Notable Alumnae ==
TWCU is ranked as one of the top women's universities in Japan. Among the famous students and graduates of TWCU are

- Marie Kondo (consultant, author)
- Sawako Ariyoshi (writer)
- Hanae Mori (fashion designer)
- Jakucho Setouchi (writer)
- Mikako Tabe (actress)
- Ichiko Ima (manga artist)
- Masae Ido (politician)

== International exchanges ==
The university maintains connections and exchanges with other highly selective universities around the world.

- Australia: University of Wollongong, Australian Catholic University, Flinders University
- China - Shanghai International Studies University
- Korea - Ewha Womans University, Sungshin University
- USA - St. Michael's College, Scripps College, California State University, Presbyterian College, Otterbein University
- Canada - McGill University, Algoma University, University of the Fraser Valley
- UK - Lancaster University, Middlesex University, The University of Edinburgh, The University of Leeds, The University of York
- Ireland - Dublin City University
- Spain - Alcalingua, Universidad de Alcalá
- France - Université Catholique de L'Ouest

== English education ==
Tokyo Woman's Christian University provides a high standard of English-language education. It offers a “Career English Program” where students take content courses conducted entirely in English and develop high-level critical thinking, debate, writing, speaking, and presentation skills.

In addition, weekly English conversation classes are offered at the Career English Island (CEI) with English instructors and students from other universities. Any university member is eligible to participate.

Tokyo Woman's Christian University is also one of the regular hosts of the International Theater Company London which comes from London to perform Shakespearean plays in English, directed by MBE Paul Stebbings and brought to Japan by Paula Berwanger. Past performances include A Midsummer Night's Dream, Romeo and Juliet and Twelfth Night. The 2020 performance of Othello was cancelled due to Covid-19.

== Campus festival ==
Every year the university festival, called "VERA Festival," is held on campus in November. "VERA" comes from the Latin "QUAECUNQUE SUNT VERA." This phrase is engraved on Tokyo Woman's Christian University's main building. It comes from Paul’s famous letter to the Philippians 4:8:

Whatever is true, whatever is honorable, whatever is just, whatever is pure, whatever is lovely, whatever is commendable, if there is any excellence, if there is anything worthy of praise, think about these things.

The VERA festival has a variety of performances by university clubs and many people visit.

== University symbol ==
The university symbol was designed in 1918 by President Dr. Inazo Nitobe. The symbol has two linked “S's" which represent “service and sacrifice” and he took the initial letters of “service and sacrifice” and produced this mark expressing the Christian ethos. He taught that “service and sacrifice,” helping other people, is the best idea to represent the spirit of Christianity. This symbol appears on many kinds of things including stationery sold in the TWCU book store.

== University song ==
During its history TWCU has had two university songs. The first song was composed by Kosaku Yamada. The second song for TWCU was composed by the English poet Edmund Blunden in 1950. The fourth president, Isao Saito, asked Blunden, who was a professor at TWCU and the University of Tokyo, to compose a new university song. This song is based on an old English hymn and is sung in Japanese at the graduation ceremony each year.
