= Yuko Takada Keller =

Japanese artist (born 1958)

- Born: Yuko Takada; May 1, 1958 (age 67); Osaka, Japan
- Education: Kyoto City University of Arts
- Known for: Soft sculpture, installation art, weaving, textile, essay,
- Awards: 1984 Kyoto Design Prize; Kyoto Design Forum / Japan; 1989 Excellent Prize; Kanazawa Selected Craft Exhibition / Japan; 1990 Excellent Prize; Kyoto Art Craft Biennale / Japan; 1992 Excellent Prize; The 2nd Kyoto Selected Craft Exhibition / Japan; 1995 First Prize; "White Nights" II. International Textile Exhibition / Russia; 2004 Frederiksborg Amts Billedkunstpris 2004 / Denmark
- Website: www.yukotakada.com

Yuko Takada Keller (高田ケラー有子, Yuko Takada Keller; born May 1, 1958) is an artist, curator and essayist based in Helsinge, Denmark since 1997. The first exhibition in Denmark was in 1996, container '96 in Copenhagen.

She started her art activities in 1982 with woolen tapestries, though, 1985, she traveled around Northern Europe to change her art expression to be hanging sculpture. She creates delicate and ethereal hanging sculptures using tracing paper.

After she moved to Denmark in 1997, she primarily exhibits her works in cultural centers and other public spaces, excelling in site-specific installations. In addition to showcasing her own creations, she also works as a curator, organizing exhibitions that introduce numerous Japanese artists to Denmark. Notably, the exhibition "Japanese Suppleness" that she curated was a great success, as Queen Margrethe II visited and guided her exhibition tour.

She has also collaborated with musicians in the context of her exhibitions. In recent years, while continuing to use laminated tracing paper, she has incorporated elements of light into her works, utilizing mirror sheets, holographic sheets, and other flexible materials that enhance durability for the public space.

She has also written some essays in Japanese newspapers, magazines etc. From 2004 to 2010, she wrote essays for JMM (Japanese Mail Media) as a Japanese citizen residing abroad. Her book about Danish child rearing was published in 2005, from NHK Publishing Co., Ltd. As a volunteer, she has been supporting the school exchange project between Nordstjerneskolen in Helsinge, where her son used to be a student, and the primary school and junior high school in Miyama, Kyoto, Japan, since 2016. Additionally, she contributes to cultural exchange between the two countries through art workshops and by introducing lifestyles and social backgrounds.

== Education ==
She received her B.F.A. in 1981, and her M.F.A. in 1983 both from Kyoto City University of Arts.

== Career ==
- 1983-85, 1987-89 Parttime lecturer, Kyoto City University of Arts.
- 1988-90 Parttime Lecturer, Kyoto Junior College of Art
- 1988-90 Parttime Lecturer, Seian College of Art and Design (Osaka Seikei University)
- 1990~1994 Instructor in the Department of Creative Arts at Seian College of Art and Design (Osaka Seikei University)
- 1994~1997 Associate Professor in the Department of Creative Arts at Seian College of Art and Design (Osaka Seikei University)
- 2014~2019 Guest Professor of Sagami Women's University
- 2016~2020 Advisor for the Miyama Forest Education Project
- 2020~2024 Director of the NPO Forest Education Project.
- 2024~ Part-time Lecturer in Gribskov 10 Japan Class

== Exhibitions ==
=== Recent Solo Exhibition ===
- 2017 Kulturhavn Gilleleje / Gilleleje, Denmark
- 2018 Gallery Nakamura / Kyoto, Japan
- 2018 Space Yui / Tokyo, Japan
- 2021 Vandrehallen Hillerød Bibliotek / Hillerød, Denmark
- 2022 Museum for Papirkusnt (~2023) / Blokhus, Denmark
- 2022 Rejsestalden / Jægerspris, Denmark
- 2023 C4 Hillerød Knowledge Center / Hillerod, Denmark
- 2023 MI Gallery / Osaka, Japan

and 50 more solo exhibitions in Denmark, Japan and Belgium since 1982

=== Representative Group Exhibitions ===
- 1987 13th International Biennale of Tapestry (Lausanne/ SWITZERLAND)
- 1991 "Restless Shadows" Japanese Fiberart Traveling in U.K.
- 1991 "KAMI" Exhibition (Kuopio Museum) Traveling in Finland -1992
- 1991 Kyoto Fibers (Montclair State College) Traveling in U.S.A. -1993
- 1993 WAVES: Contemporary Japanese Fiberworks (The Library & Gallery / Ontario) - Traveling in CANADA -1995
- 1993 SHIGA ANNUAL '93 FIBER WORK/ THE REPRO & ACTION OF FORM (The Museum of Modern Art Shiga)
- 1995 "White Nights" II. International Textile Exhibition (Russian Ethnograhy Museum / RUSSIA)
- 1996 Container '96, Copenhagen Denmark
- 1998 IMAGINATIONS (Galerij Lauka / Lo-Reninge, Belgium)
- 2000 Blue Link/ Gjethuset/ Frederiksværk, Denmark
- 2002 PRO (Charlottenborg / Copenhagen, Denmark)
- 2002 Holland Paper Biennial 2002 (Museum Rijswijk / Holland)
- 2005 Contemporary Japanese and Danish Art and Craft (Dronninglund Kunstcenter / Denmark)
- 2007 “Japanese Suppleness – Contemporary Art from Japan” (Frederiksværk, Denmark)
- 2009 Roommade/Roommate (Gjethuset / Frederiksværk, Denmark)
- 2011 Japanese Harmony (Portalen / Greve, Denmark)
- 2014 Guest Artist for "FIBER FUTURES" Japan's Textile Pioneers (Gjethuset / Frederiksværk, Denmark)
- 2017 Colours from Denmark with Carsten Dahl (Homyo-ji temple / Kyoto, Japan)
- 2017 “Essence – IKI” Exchange Exhibition by Danish and Japanese artists (Dronninhlund Kunstcenter / Denmark)
- 2019 In Relation with Nature (Gammelgaard / Herlev, Denmark)
- 2022 TRÅD – Japanese & Danish Textile Exhibition (Annaborg / Hillerød, Denmark)
- 2025 ARThitecture (Nipponbashi House / Osaka Japan)

and more than 100 other selected group exhibitions in Hungary, Germany, Denmark and Japan since 1982

== Public collection ==
- National Museum of Art, Osaka
- Portalen
- Seiryukai Kyoto Japan
- Hillerød Bibliotek
- Bagsværd Church
- Kulturhavn Gilleleje

== Commission Work ==
- Tokyo Water Works, Tokyo Japan (1996~2010)
- Hayashima Town Hall, Okayama Japan (1997~)
- över gården, Nishinomiya, Japan (2004~2014, Closed in 2014)
- Hyogo Nursing Association, Kobe Japan (2007~)
- Mimihara Hospital, Osaka Japan (2015~)
- Andersen Bakery, Hiroshima Japan (2022~)

== Art Collaboration ==
- 2012 BVLGARI / Ginza, Tokyo Japan
- 2012 ACUTS / Shinjuku, TOKYO Japan
- 2012 dia collection / Osaka, Japan
- 2014 Lexus TOYOTA / Kobe, Japan
- 2022 Tapic Taraso therapy / Ginoza Okinawa

== Display ==
- 2020~21 Kapau Christmas Window Installation / Copenhagen, Denmark
- 2017 Skagens Museum Christmas Installation / Skagen, Denmark
- 2016 Karl-e Christmas Installation / Frederiksværk, Denmark
- 2000 Royal Copenhagen / Copenhagen, DenmarK
- 1996 ein / Kyoto, Japan
- 1995 ein / Kyoto, Japan
- 1994 Gallery O - WAVE / Osaka, Japan
- 1993 ISETAN Department Store / Tokyo, Japan
- 1990 Shoe Gallery OTA / Ashiya, Japan

== Awards ==
- 2004 Frederiksborg Amts Billdekunstpris 2004 / Denmark
- 1995 First Prize; "White Nights" II. International Textile Exhibition / Russia
- 1992 Excellent Prize; The 2nd Kyoto Selected Craft Exhibition / Japan
- 1990 Excellent Prize; Kyoto Art Craft Biennale / Japan
- 1989 Excellent Prize; Kanazawa Selected Craft Exhibition / Japan
- 1984 Kyoto Design Prize; Kyoto Design Forum / Japan

== Featured in publications ==
- 1993 SENSHOKU-alpha Jan. No.142 (Written by Kiyoji Tsuji / JAPAN) ISSN 0389-9381
- 1993 SENSHOKU-alpha Mar. No.144 (Written by Kiyoji Tsuji, Keiko Kawashima / JAPAN) ISSN 0389-9381
- 1994 FIBER ART JAPAN (Published by Shinshindo Publishing / JAPAN) ISBN 978-4-397-50393-1
- 1994 PIA KANSAI, ART FRONT (Written by Takafumi Kobuki / JAPAN)
- 1994 NISHIJIN GRAPH, VOL.448/SEP (Written by Teruko Sugiyama / JAPAN)
- 1995 ART & Crafts (Published by design house / KOREA) ISNN 1227-1179
- 1995 TEXTILE PLUS, 151 (Written by Marijke Arp / Holland) ISSN 0927-7560
- 1995 Space Design, SD9510 (Published by Kashima Publishing / JAPAN) ISSN 0563-0991
- 1996 FIBERARTS Jan/Feb1996 Vol.22, No.4 (Written by Carol D. Westfall/ U.S.A) ISSN 0164-324X
- 1997 Novel Object II (Published by design house / KOREA) ISBN 978-89-7041-356-3
- 1997 Art Textile of The World: Japan (Telos Art Publishing / UK) ISBN 978-0-9526267-4-9
- 2002 TIJDLOOS PAPIER / TIMELASS PAPER (Uitgeverij Compres BV / Holland) ISBN 978-90-73803-03-9
- 2002 kM zomer 2002 (Written by Peter van der Meijden / Holland) ISSN 0927-1058
- 2004 Sphere magazine (Publisher & Editor David A. Williams / Denmark) ISSN 1603-9912
- 2006 Les Nouvelles du Patchwork (Association France Patchwork / France) ISSN 0991-2118
- 2007 Tactile (Published by Gestalten Verlag, Berlin Germany) ISBN 978-3-89955-200-3
- 2011 Papercraft 2 (Published by Gestalten Verlag, Berlin Germany) ISBN 978-3-89955-333-8
- 2011 DESIGN 360° N.35 (DESIGN 360°/ China) ISSN 1815-9222
- 2012 Paper Works (SANDU / China) ISBN 978-1-58423-432-6
- 2013 Paper Art I (Published by ARTPOWER International Publishing Co., Hong Kong) ISBN 978-988-15742-0-6
- 2015 PARADISE OF PAPER ART 2―THE WORLD OF DANCE PAPER (Desingerbooks / Beijing China) ISBN 978-988-13782-1-7
- 2015 Art Quarter Vol.8 (Published by Moon Art Co., Ltd / Taiwan)
- 2015 Paper Art II (Published by ARTPOWER International Publishing Co., Ltd / China) ISBN 978-988-13542-4-2

== Media Appearance ==
- 1996 NHK TV Educational (Japan) "Sunday Museum" Report of "Container '96" in Denmark
- 2000 NHK TV International (Japan) "65 years Anniversary program"
- 2005 Radio AM Culture (Japan) "JOQR" Talk Guest
- 2007 NHK TV BS1 (Japan) " Earth AGORA" reporter
- 2007 NHK TV BS1 (Japan) " Earth AGORA" reporter
- 2008 NHK TV BS1 (Japan) " Earth AGORA" reporter
- 2008 NHK TV BS1 (Japan) " Earth AGORA" reporter
- 2009 Radio FM Tokai (Japan) "Morning Charge" Talk Guest
- 2011 NHK BS1 " Earth AGORA" reporter
- 2012 NHK TV BS1 (Japan) “Earth TV 100" reporter “Consumption tax of the world”
- 2012 NHK TV BS1 (Japan) “Earth TV 100" reporter “Global Energy Policy”
- 2012 Radio J-JWAVE 360° (Japan) "No Borders Lounge" Talk Guest
- 2012 NHK TV BS1 (Japan) "EL MUNDO" Talk Guest “Danish art and child rearing”
- 2013 ABC Radio (Japan) "Wakako Takeda's Program" Interview
- 2014 KBS Kyoto (Japan) "Takeo Moritani's Program" Talk Guest
- 2015 Radio Okinawa (Japan)“Art Palet” Talk Guest
- 2016 KBS Kyoto Radio (Japan)“Kazuo Senoo’s Paradise Kyoto" Talk Guest
- 2016 KBS Kyoto Radio (Japan) “Takeo Moritani’s Program” Talk Guest
- 2016 KBS Kyoto Radio (Japan) “Hollow from Recording Studio” Main personality
- 2017 KBS Kyoto Radio (Japan) “Takeo Moritani’s Program" Talk Guest
- 2019 KBS Kyoto Radio (Japan) ”Sara-Pin Kyoto - Makoto Kajiwara” Talk Guest
- 2021 TBS TV (Japan) “Morning Channel” Online report from Denmark
- 2023 KBS Kyoto Radio (Japan) "Sara-Pin! Kyoto - Makoto Kajiwara " Talk Guest
- 2024 KBS Kyoto Radio (Japan) “Hollow from Recording Studio” Main personality
