= Reischauer (surname) =

Reischauer is a surname. Notable people with the surname include:

- August Karl Reischauer (1879–1971), American Presbyterian missionary
- Edwin O. Reischauer (1910–1990), American diplomat, historian and Japanologist
- Haru M. Reischauer (1915–1998), Japanese-American writer and wife of Edwin O. Reischauer
- Robert Reischauer (born 1941), American economist
