= Tokyo Junior Orchestra Society =

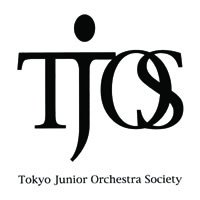
logo of the Tokyo Junior Orchestra Society

The Tokyo Junior Orchestra Society (東京ジュニアオーケストラソサエティー) was established in April 1994 by Fuminori “Maro” Shinozaki, the Principal Concertmaster of the NHK Symphony Orchestra. Orchestra members are instructed by members of professional orchestras and university instructors.

Most members are currently enrolled in pre-collegiate music programs, contributing to its reputation as one of the most selective youth orchestras in Japan. Prospective members must pass auditions held throughout the year.

Past performances include a performance of Chopin's Piano Concerto No.1 which was broadcast on television in 2010. It has had joint concerts with the NHK Symphony Orchestra, which were also broadcast on television, and with the California Youth Symphony.

Tokyo Junior Orchestra Society was accredited by the Tokyo Metropolitan Government as an endorsed non-profit organization in 2009.

== Current instructors ==
Fuminori Shinozaki, Principal Concertmaster of NHK Symphony Orchestra

Hisashi Ono, Vice Principal Viola, NHK Symphony Orchestra

Masayo Okuta, Former Principal Violinist, Tokyo Symphony Orchestra, Lecturer at Musashino Academia Musicae, Junior and Senior High School attached to the Kunitachi College of Music, and Toho Junior College of Music

Ayumu Kuwata, Vice Principal Cellist, NHK Symphony Orchestra

Shu Yoshida, Principal Double Bassist, NHK Symphony Orchestra

Atsushi Ichinohe, Principal Flautist, Yomiuri Nippon Symphony Orchestra, Lecturer at Toho Gakuen School of Music and Musashino Academia Musicae

Naoki Sugiura, Former Principal Oboist at Tokyo Symphony Orchestra, Assistant Professor of Kunitachi College of Music

Shuhei Isobe, Former Principal Clarinetist at NHK Symphony Orchestra, Research Professor of Toho College of Music, Lecturer at Tokyo University of the Arts

Shoichi Kubo, Principal Percussionist at NHK Symphony Orchestra, Associate Professor of Tokyo College of Music, Lecturer at Musashino Academia Musicae

Masaru Yoshida, Principal Bassoonist, Yomiuri Nippon Symphony Orchestra

Masato Yoshinaga, Principal French Horn Player, Shin Nippon Symphony Orchestra

Atsushi Takahashi, Principal Trumpet Player, Tokyo Metropolitan Symphony Orchestra

Tomonori Sato, Principal Trumpet Player, Tokyo Symphony Orchestra

Noboru Ogino, Principal Trombone Player, Tokyo Symphony Orchestra
