= Gakushuin Women's College =

Coordinates: 35°42′27″N 139°42′44″E

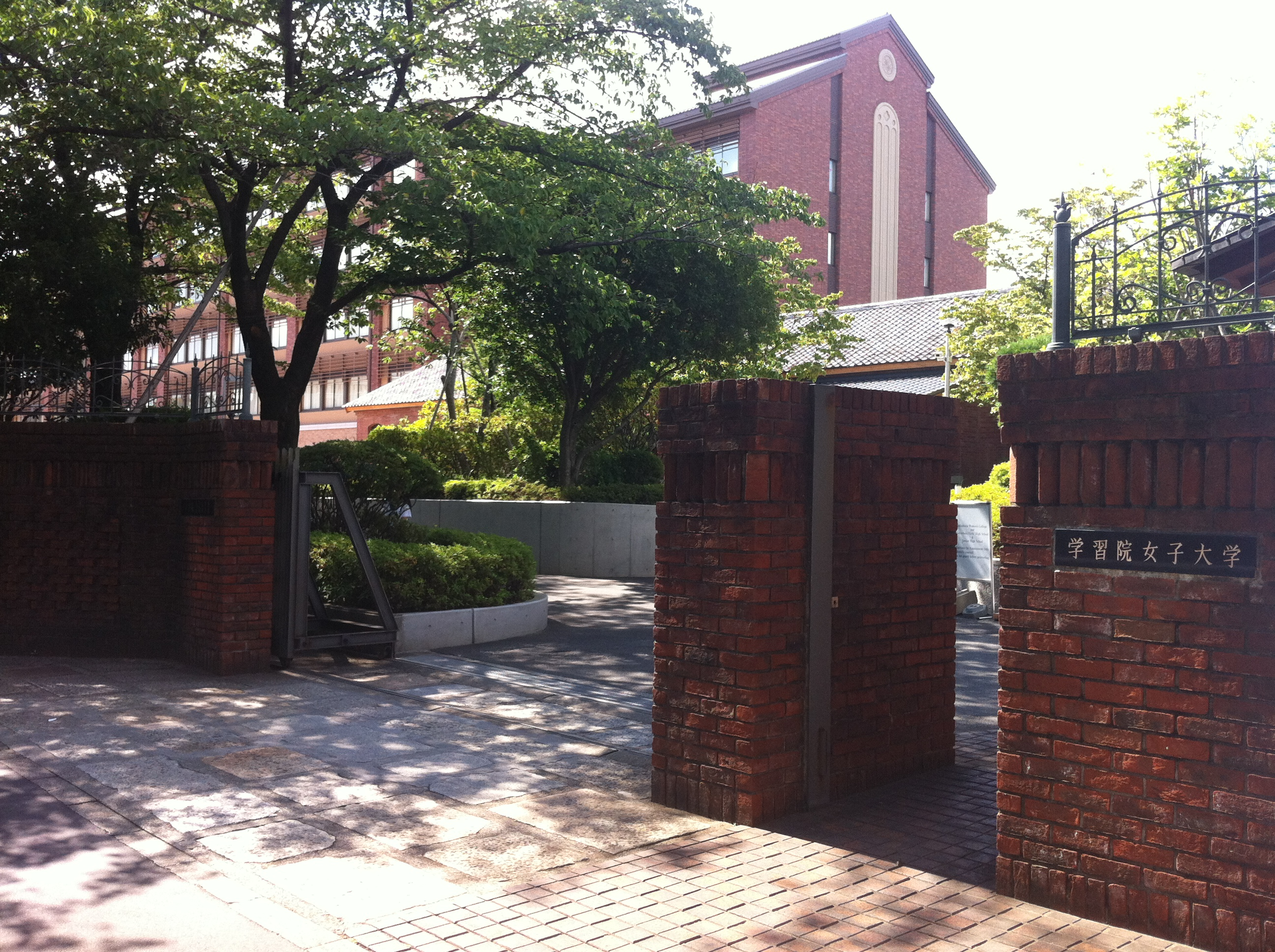
Gakushuin Women's College, north gate.

Gakushuin Women's College (学習院女子大学, Gakushūin joshi daigaku) was a private women's college in Shinjuku, Tokyo, Japan; part of the Gakushūin School Corporation (学習院). The predecessor of the school was founded in 1847 by Emperor Kōmei. It was chartered as a junior college in 1949 and became a four-year college in 1998. It was absorbed into Gakushuin University in 2026. It became an intercultural studies program at Gakushuin University.

Gakushuin Women's College is also one of the main hosts of the International Theater Company London which comes from London to perform Shakespearean plays in English, directed by Paul Stebbings MBE and brought to Japan by Paula Berwanger. Past performances include A Midsummer Night's Dream, Romeo and Juliet and Twelfth Night. The 2020 performance of Othello was cancelled due to COVID-19.
