= Tokiwakai College =

Private junior college in Hirano-ku, Osaka, Osaka, Japan

Coordinates: 34°37′2.8″N 135°33′39.4″E

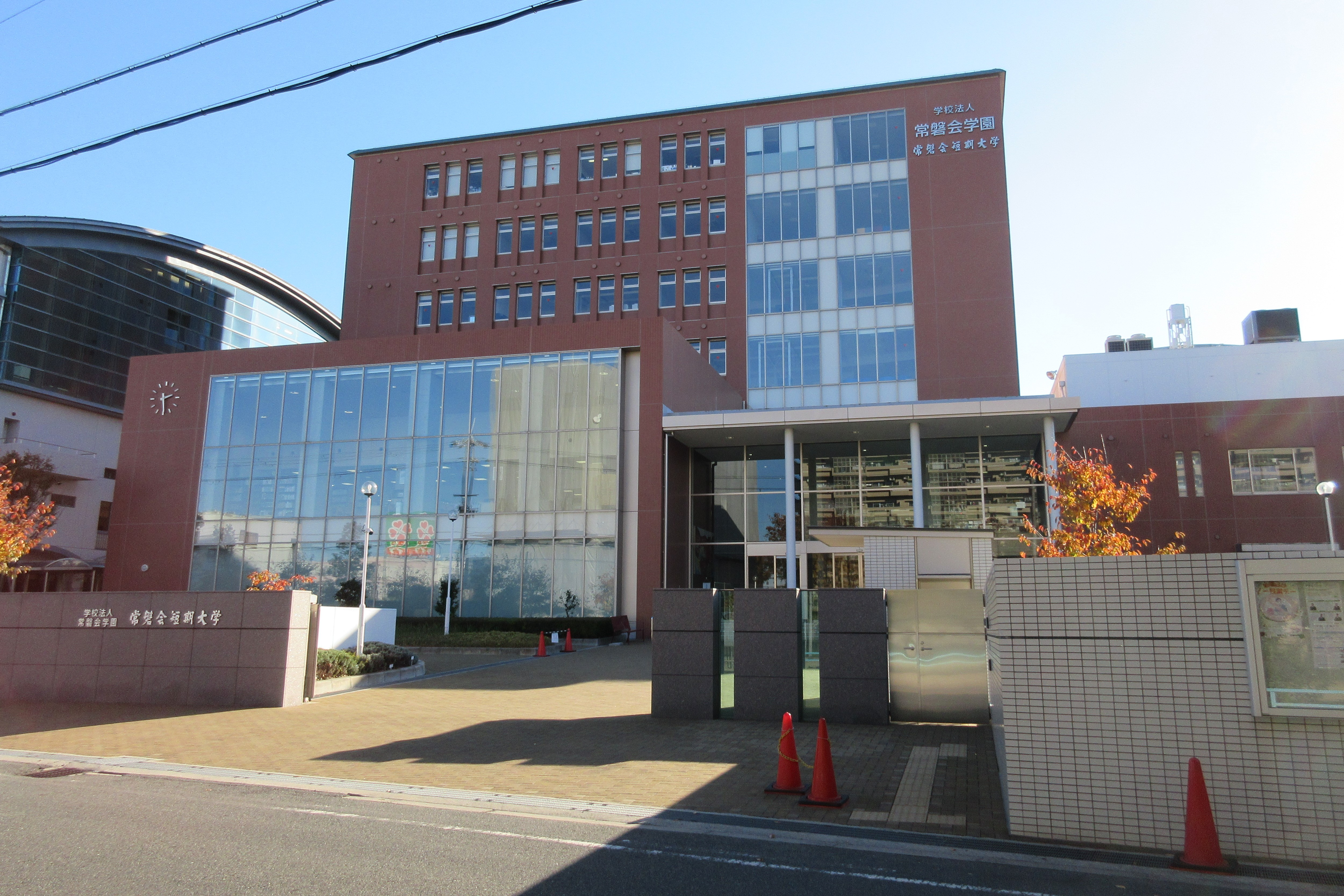
Image of the college taken on November 24, 2018

Tokiwakai College (常磐会短期大学, Tokiwakai tanki daigaku) is a private junior college in Hirano-ku, Osaka, Osaka, Japan. It is located next to Tokiwakai Gakuen University. The precursor of the school was founded in 1953, and chartered as a university in 1964.
