= Sōka University =

University in Tokyo, Japan

Coordinates: 35.688°N 139.329°E

Soka University
- 創価大学
- Motto: Discover Your Potential
- Type: Private
- Established: 1971
- Affiliations: ASAIHL
- President: Mika Suzuki
- Faculty: 338
- Students: 5,922 (as of 15 September, 2026)
- Undergraduates: 5,618
- Location: 1-236 Tangi-cho, Hachiōji-shi, Tokyo 192-8577, Japan, Hachiōji, Tokyo, Japan
- Campus: Suburban
- Colors: Blue White
- Mascot: Roaring Lion
- Website: www.soka.ac.jp/en

Soka University (Japanese: 創価大学, Hepburn: Sōka Daigaku), abbreviated typically as Sodai (創大) or Sokadai (創価大), is a Soka Gakkai-affiliated private university in Hachiōji, Tokyo, Japan. In 2014, the Japanese Ministry of Education, Culture, Sports, Science and Technology (MEXT) designated Soka University as one of the 20 universities in Japan that "are leading the globalization of Japanese society".

According to QS World University Rankings 2026, Soka University was ranked 43rd in Japan and 1400th in the World. The university has 8 faculties with 5,922 students (as of September 15, 2026), about 656 of whom are international students from 60 countries and regions.

There are five libraries named Central Library, Fraster Library, Shirakaba Library, Law School Library, and Soka Women's College KAHO Library.

== History ==
Soka University opened on April 2, 1971, with its graduate school opening in April 1975. Since the school's founding, more than 50,000 students have graduated from Soka University.

Soka University of America is a related school founded in 2001, located in Aliso Viejo, California, which offers both graduate and undergraduate degrees.

== Educational philosophy ==
Soka University's educational philosophy was established by Tsunesaburō Makiguchi, the first president of the Soka Gakkai (then called the Soka Kyoiku Gakkai, or Value-creating Education Society), who had worked as the principal of an elementary school in Japan. Makiguchi published the book "The System of Value-Creating Pedagogy" based on his belief that the purpose of education is the students' happiness, and emphasized humanistic education. This educational philosophy was shared by his successor, Jōsei Toda, who had served as a primary school teacher. Toda's successor, Daisaku Ikeda, describes his goal as carrying out the dreams of Makiguchi and Toda.

"Soka" is a Japanese term meaning "value creation". In 1971, when Daisaku Ikeda founded Soka University, the school established the following founding principles:

- Be the highest seat of learning for humanistic education.
- Be the cradle of a new culture.
- Be a fortress for the peace of humankind.

Since 2010, the university has also adopted the official motto Discover Your Potential (自分力の発見).

== Organization ==
=== Faculties [the number of people (as of 17th September 2026)] ===
- Faculty of Economics and Business Administration [323]
- Faculty of Economics [468]
  - Department of Economics
- Faculty of Business Administration [698]
  - Department of Business Administration
- Faculty of Law [713]
  - Department of Law
- Faculty of Nursing [315]
  - Department of Nursing
- Faculty of Science and Engineering [645]
  - Department of Information System Engineering
  - Department of Science and Engineering for Sustainable Innovation
- Faculty of International Liberal Arts [359]
  - Department of International Liberal Arts
- Faculty of Letters [1,225]
  - Department of Humanities
- Faculty of Education [738]
  - Department of Education
  - Department of Primary Education

=== Number of people (as of 22nd September 2026) ===
- Economics [24]
- Law [20]
- Letters [85]
- Education [19]
- International Peace Studies [13]
- Science and Engineering [208]

=== Honors Program ===
- Global Citizenship Program (GCP)
- School for Excellence in Educational Development (SEED)
- Language Education

=== Research institutes ===
- Institute of Oriental Philosophy

== Honorary doctorates ==
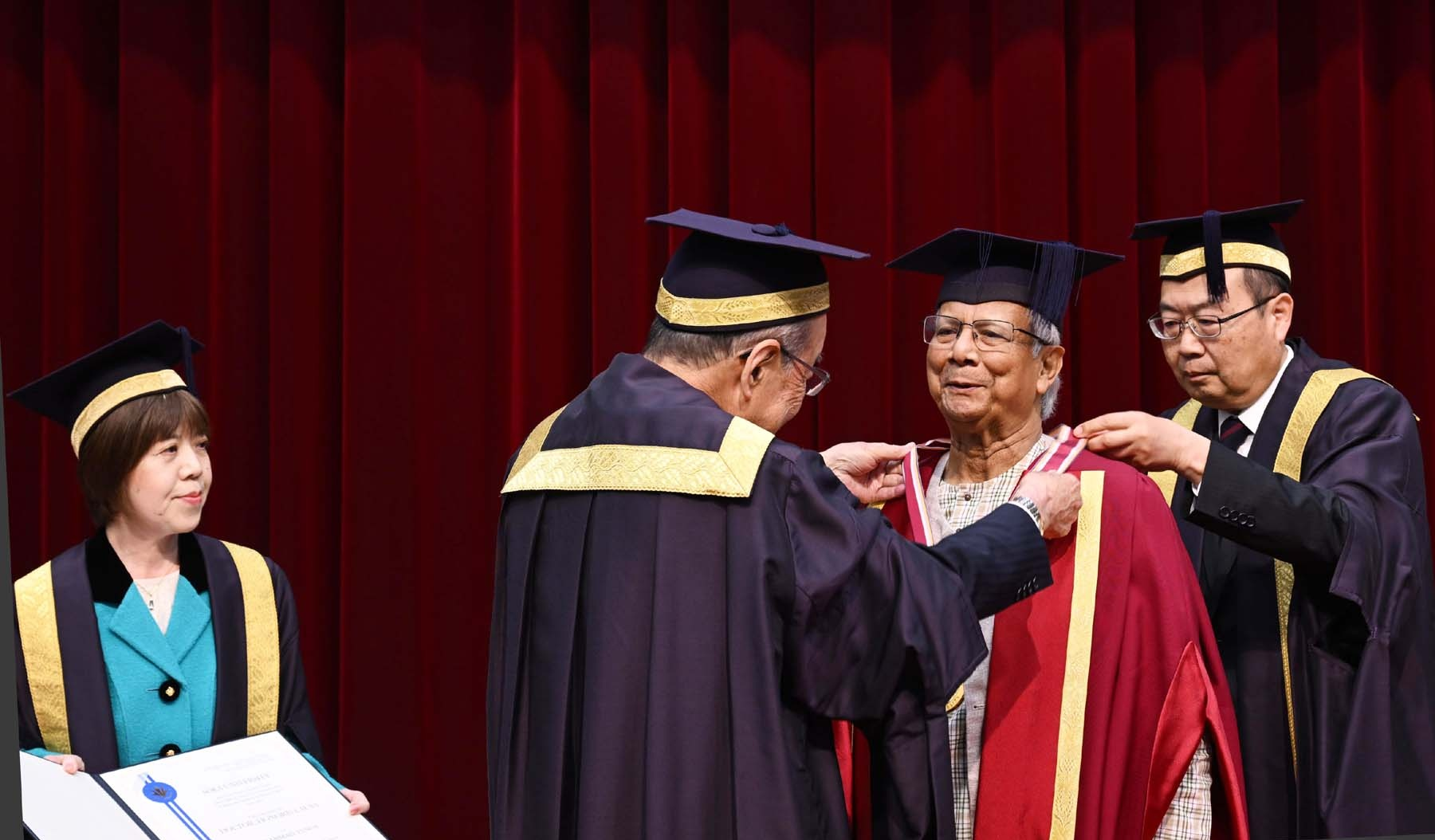
Soka University awarded an honorary doctorate to Nobel Peace laureate Muhammad Yunus in 2025.

As of 2015, Soka University had awarded 365 honorary doctorates and honorary professorships, primarily to international figures in academia and culture. In April 1993, Mikhail Gorbachev traveled to Tokyo together with his wife Raisa to receive an honorary doctorate from Soka University in recognition of his efforts for world peace. A cherry tree was planted at the university in their honor during their visit. Rosa Parks visited Soka University in 1994 to deliver a lecture, and was bestowed an honorary doctorate at that time for her contributions to civil rights. When Nelson Mandela visited Soka University in 1995, he was awarded an honorary doctorate for his lifelong work to promote human rights. In 1996, the university awarded an honorary doctorate to Fidel Castro in recognition of his efforts to establish exemplary health care and education systems for his nation's people. In 2008, an honorary doctorate was awarded to a professor at Moscow State University, Mihail Sokolov, a medical robotics scientist.

== Soka Women's College ==
Soka Women's College
- 創価女子短期大学
- Type: Private women's junior college
- Established: 1985
- Location: Hachiōji, Tokyo, Japan
- Website: www.soka.ac.jp/swc/

Soka University shares its campus in Hachiōji, Tokyo, with Sōka Women's College (創価女子短期大学, Sōka Joshi Tanki Daigaku), an affiliated private junior college that was founded on April 2, 1985.

== See also ==
- List of universities in Japan
  - List of universities in Tokyo
- List of junior colleges in Japan
