= California Youth Symphony =

Orchestras in San Francisco, California

- Youth orchestra
- Short name: CYS
- Founded: 1952, by Aaron Sten
- Location: San Francisco Bay Area, California, U.S.
- Principal conductor: Lauren Jakey
- Music director: Leo Eylar
- Website: www.cys.org

California Youth Symphony (CYS) is a nonprofit San Francisco Bay Area symphony orchestra for young musicians of high-school age and younger. It was founded in 1952 by conductor Aaron Sten. In 1963, they became the first United States youth orchestra to tour abroad, performing twelve concerts in Japan, including a joint concert with the Tokyo Junior Orchestra Society. Since then, the orchestra has toured Mexico, Australia, Uruguay, Argentina, and several countries in Europe and Asia. In 1994, the orchestra placed first in the International Youth and Music Festival Competition in Vienna. The orchestra has also collaborated with youth orchestras in Japan and in Switzerland. During the summer of 2014, the orchestra toured in Eastern Europe and performed in Slovakia, Slovenia, Croatia, and the Czech Republic.

Lauren Jakey succeeded Aaron Sten as the orchestra's conductor in 1979. Leo Eylar has been musical director since 1990.

== History and tours ==
The California Youth Symphony (CYS) is one of the first youth symphony orchestras established in California and comprises some of the state's most musically talented youth. It was founded in 1952, and since 1963 has toured several countries around the globe, a semi-annual tradition, and most recently completed a tour to Spain with performances of Gershwin's An American in Paris, de Falla's "Final Dance" from the opera The Three-Cornered Hat, and Stravinsky's The Firebird.

== Repertoire ==
CYS is notable for its challenging repertoire that includes works by Igor Stravinsky, Béla Bartók, Dmitri Shostakovich, Aaron Copland, George Gershwin, Leonard Bernstein, Sergei Prokofiev, Richard Strauss, Gustav Mahler, and many others. CYS has also premiered many modern works, including music director Leo Eylar's "Rhapsody for Orchestra", a piece nominated for the Pulitzer Prize, and the West-Coast premiere of pieces such as "Resurrexit" by Mason Bates.

CYS has also recorded a number of CDs, the most recent recorded during the 2010–2011 season. More information regarding CYS recordings is available on the California Youth Symphony website, where sound samples are also available.

== Ensembles ==
The CYS comprises several ensembles. In addition to the premier CYS Orchestra (the senior/advanced level) there is an advanced/intermediate level CYS Associate Orchestra, Wind Symphony, Percussion Ensemble, Flute Ensemble, and Preparatory Ensembles for strings and winds. Overall, CYS musicians number over 500 from the greater San Francisco Bay Area, ranging from elementary school students to high school seniors. Composer-conductor Leo Eylar, former co-concertmaster of the San Jose Symphony, conducts the senior and associate and orchestras.

=== CYS Senior Orchestra ===
The CYS Orchestra is CYS's senior/advanced level and is conducted by Leo Eylar. It performs seven concerts per year in the Bay Area. Members participate in weekly rehearsals during the school year, including special section-specific workshops by outside instructors. They attend a week of sleep-away summer camp in the redwoods. The CYS Senior Orchestra tours semiannually, in the summer.

=== CYS Associate Orchestra ===
The associate orchestra is CYS's advanced/intermediate level symphony orchestra and is also conducted by Leo Eylar. The associate orchestra plays medium-difficult repertoire and has typical orchestration. The repertoire is varied and serves as a valuable introduction to the orchestral experience. The CYS Associate Orchestra performs three to four concerts per year. Members attend a summer day-camp in August.

=== CYS Wind Symphony ===
The CYS Wind Symphony is conducted by Pete Nowlen and features woodwind, brass, and percussion players.

=== Wind Preparatory Ensembles ===
There are two Wind Preparatory (Wind Prep) Ensembles that function as large symphonic bands, and mainly comprise middle school students, along with some high school students. These Wind Prep Ensembles were under the direction of Rosita Amador (who retired in early 2023). They are called "preparatory" because they serve to prepare the younger wind players for the CYS Wind Symphony. The orchestration is typical, including flutes, oboes, clarinets, saxophones, bassoons, trumpets, French horns, trombones, and tubas. The group performs two concerts per year.

=== CYS Junior and Intermediate Preparatory String Ensembles ===
With junior and intermediate levels, the CYS String Preparatory Program provides string music instruction and ensemble experiences for younger musicians to prepare them for the CYS Associate Orchestra. Under the direction of Kati Kyme, the CYS Intermediate String Ensemble performs two concerts per year.

=== Percussion Ensemble ===
Under the direction of Artie Storch, the CYS Percussion Ensemble is a unique forum for talented musicians through grade 12. Members of the ensemble study a repertoire and perform in two to three CYS concerts each year, as well as at other music events around the Bay Area. In addition, students learn about and improve their techniques on a variety of percussion instruments. Membership is open to both members of the various CYS orchestras and to outside musicians.

== Auditions ==
Newcomers must pass an audition; those who are already in the symphony do not need to audition yearly to stay in. CYS members can be promoted to higher levels; the CYS levels of advancement might be portrayed as follows:

CYS Flute Ensemble / Wind Prep I / Beginning Strings → CYS Flute Ensemble / Wind Prep II / Intermediate Strings → Wind Symphony → Associate Orchestra → CYS Senior Orchestra

The CYS Percussion Ensemble is Non-Convergent (not part of the general promotion system)
