= Mihail Sokolov =

Russian scientist and surgeon (born 1959)

Mihail Eduardovich Sokolov
- Михаил Эдуардович Соколов
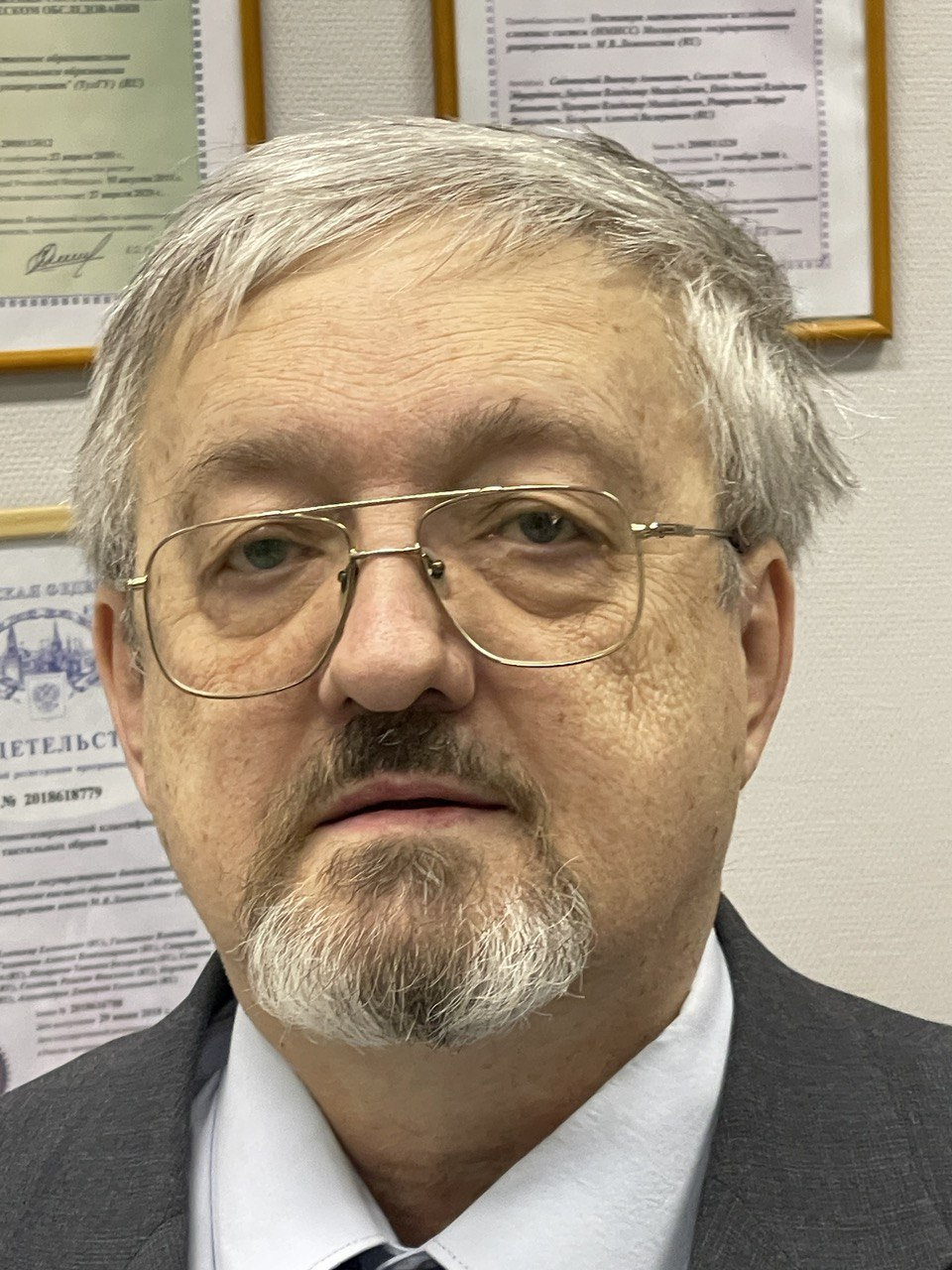
- 2023 by Eraevsky
- Born: July 11, 1959; Tula, USSR
- Citizenship: Soviet Union; Russia
- Education: Russian National Research Medical University (Dr.Sc.)
- Known for: Medical Robot Developer
- Awards: Honorary Doctor of Sōka University (2008)
- Scientific career
- Fields: Medicine, Surgery, Robotics
- Workplaces: MSU

Mihail Eduardovich Sokolov (born 1959) is a Russian scientist and surgeon who is deputy director of the Institute for Mathematical Studies of Complex Systems of Moscow State University and adviser to the rector of Moscow State University.

== Biography ==
Mihail Sokolov was born July 11, 1959, in Tula. He graduated from the Russian National Research Medical University. He defended his dissertation «System approach and control processes in obliterating diseases of limb arteries: An experimental clinical study» for the degree of Doctor of Medical Sciences in 1996.

He received the title of Professor and surgeon of the highest category. He is also a medical robot developer.

He has been working at Moscow State University since 1997: Associate professor, Professor at the MSU Faculty of Fundamental Medicine, Head of the department at the MSU Faculty of Public Administration, Vice Rector, Advisor to the Rector of Moscow State University, Director of the MSU Branch in Sevastopol (2012-2015).

Scientific interests: development of technologies and the creation of prototypes of artificial tactile mechanoreceptors for endoscopy; organization of the production of an automated diagnostic and medical complex for maintaining human life; medical robotization.

The author of 6 monographs and more than 100 publications. Sokolov has more than 20 patents and 18 certificates of registration of software rights. Head of 7 Ph.D. dissertations and a Dr.Sc. dissertation consultant.

Honorary Doctor of Sōka University (2008).

== Literature ==
- Viktor Sadovnichiy, Mihail Sokolov (2012). "From the impossible to the possible: mathematics defeats diseases". V Mire Nauki (in Russian) (6) (In the world of science ed.): 34–39. ISSN 0208-0621.
- Mihail Sokolov (2012). "The art of conveying sensations". V Mire Nauki (in Russian) (6) (In the world of science ed.): 40–43. ISSN 0208-0621.
- Mihail Sokolov (2015). "Sevastopol route MSU". V Mire Nauki (in Russian) (3) (In the world of science ed.): 44–49. ISSN 0208-0621.
