= Tokyo Tanaka College =

Former educational institution in Japan

Coordinates: 35°34′22.67″N 139°30′20.57″E

- 東京田中短期大学
- Active: 1972–2010
- Academic staff: Clothing, English studies, Child studies
- Location: Machida, Tokyo, Japan
- Campus: Machida, Tokyo Shibuya, Tokyo

Tokyo Tanaka College (東京田中短期大学, Tokyo Tanaka Tanki Daigaku) was a private junior college in Machida, Tokyo, Japan.

== History ==
In 1932, the school was founded as a dressmaker organization in Higashinada-ku, Kobe by Chiyo Tanaka. In 1972, it was chartered as a junior college with an academic department of clothing for women only in Machida, Tokyo. In 1973, the second academic department was set up: English studies for women only. In 1999, the junior college became coeducational. The college closed in 2010.
