= Senri Kinran University =

Higher education institution in Osaka Prefecture, Japan

Coordinates: 34°49′36.3″N 135°30′51.1″E

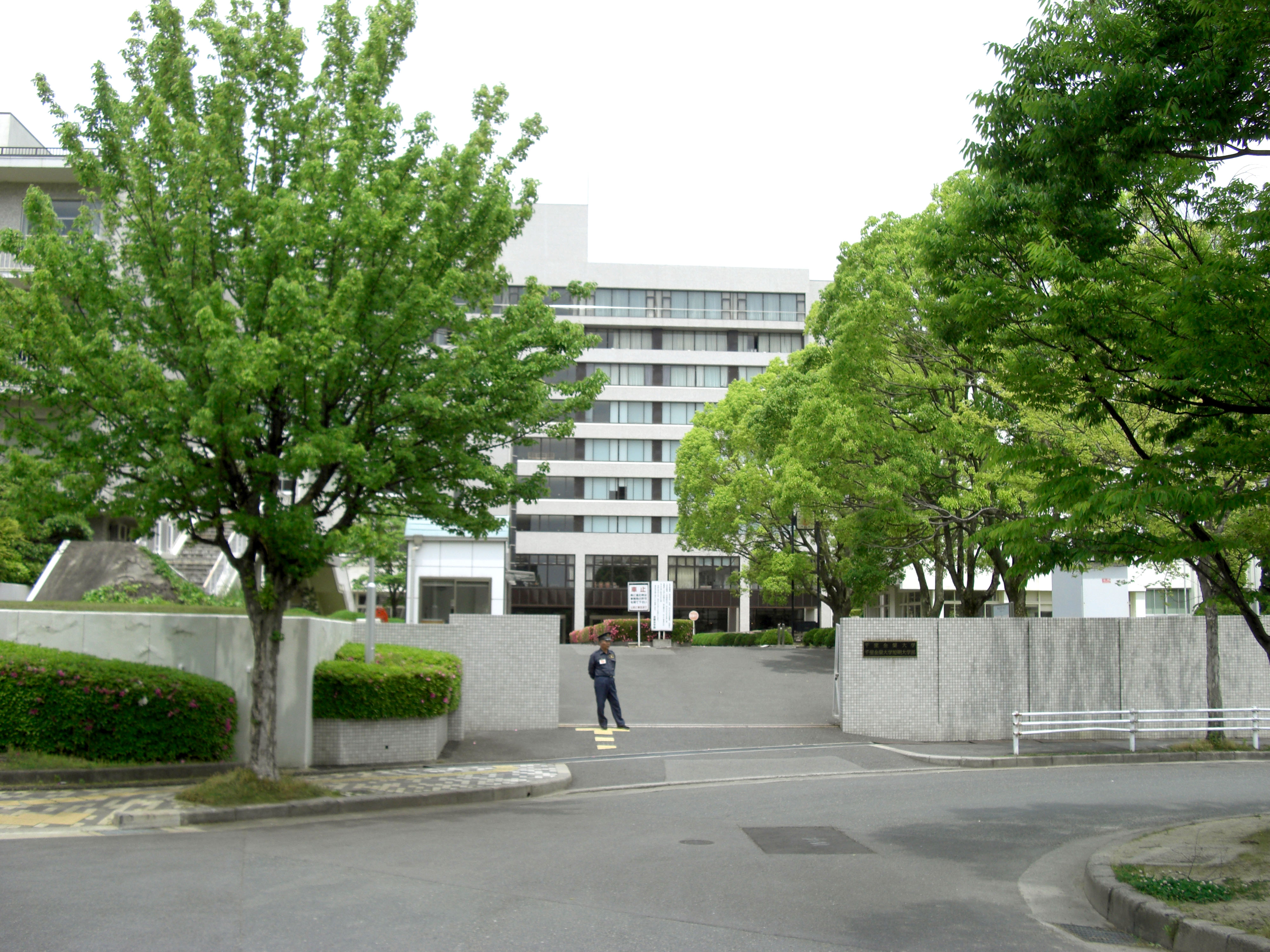
- Suita, Osaka, Japan

Information
- Type: Private university
- Established: 2003

Senri Kinran University (千里金蘭大学, Senri kinran daigaku) is a private university in Suita, Osaka, Japan, established in 2003.
