= Tokiwakai Gakuen University =

Private university in Osaka, Japan

Coordinates: 34°36′58.7″N 135°33′40.8″E

- 常磐会学園大学
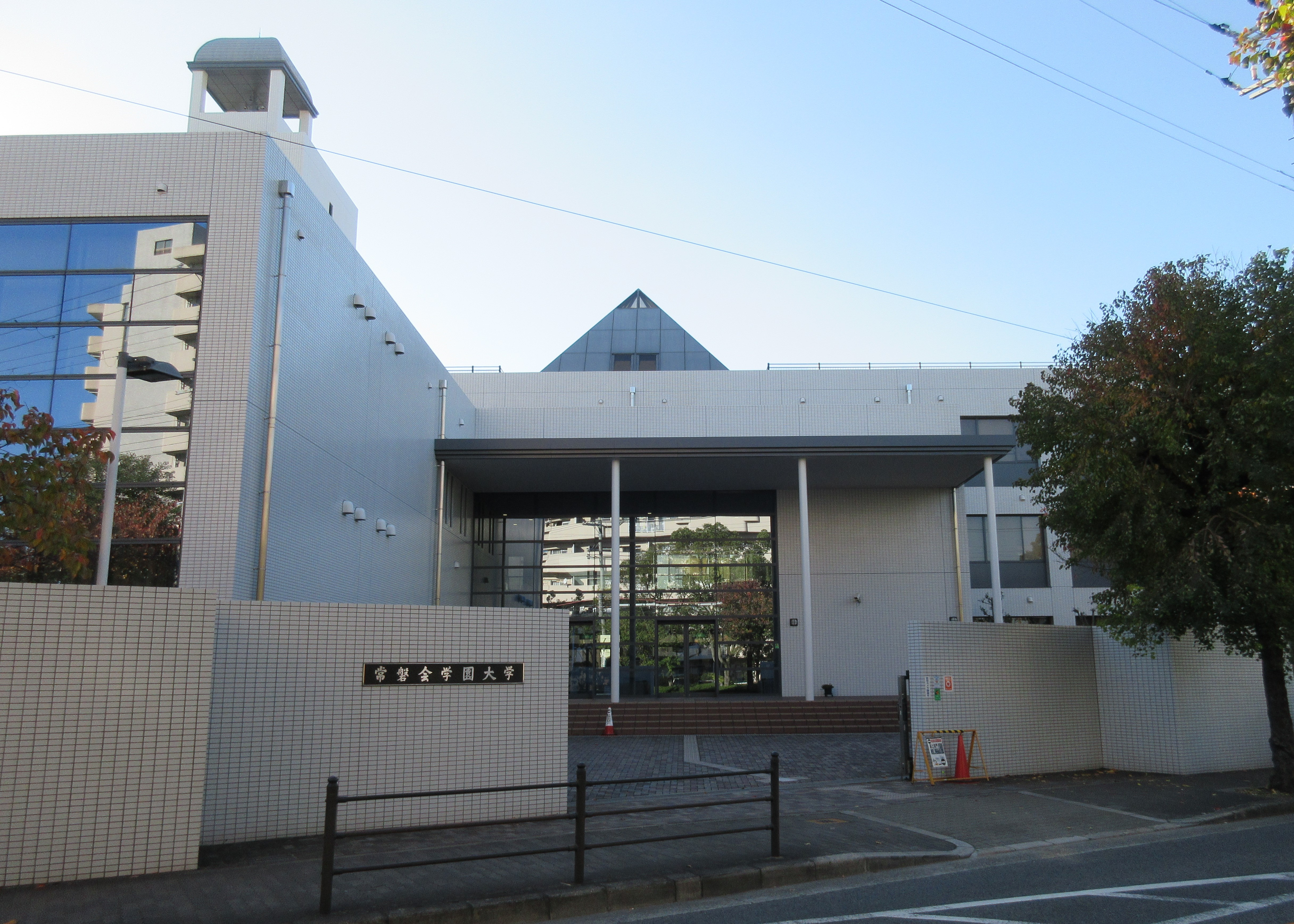
- Main gate
- Type: Private
- Established: 1953
- Parent institution: Tokiwakai Gakuen
- Location: Hirano-ku, Osaka, Japan
- Campus: Urban
- Website: www.sftokiwakai.ac.jp
- Location within Osaka Prefecture

Tokiwakai Gakuen University (常磐会学園大学, Tokiwakai gakuen daigaku) is a private university with the campus in Hirano-ku, Osaka, Osaka, Japan. It is located next to Tokiwakai College. It was established in 1999.
