= Keio Junior College of Nursing =

Former college in Japan

- 慶應義塾看護短期大学
- Type: Private
- Established: 1988
- Location: Shinjuku, Tokyo, Japan

Keio Junior College of Nursing (慶應義塾看護短期大学, Keio Gijuku Kango Tanki Daigakubu) was a private junior college in Shinjuku, Tokyo, Japan.

== History ==
The junior college was established in 1988 within the facilities of Keio University's Faculty of Medicine. Only women were allowed to attend the college, which provided qualifications of candidacy for the Japanese nursing examination. It stopped admitting students at the end of fiscal 2000, and was abolished in 2003.

== Academic departments ==
- Nursing
