= Ueno Gakuen Junior College =

Coordinates: 35°42′54.4″N 139°46′54.6″E

- 上野学園大学短期大学部
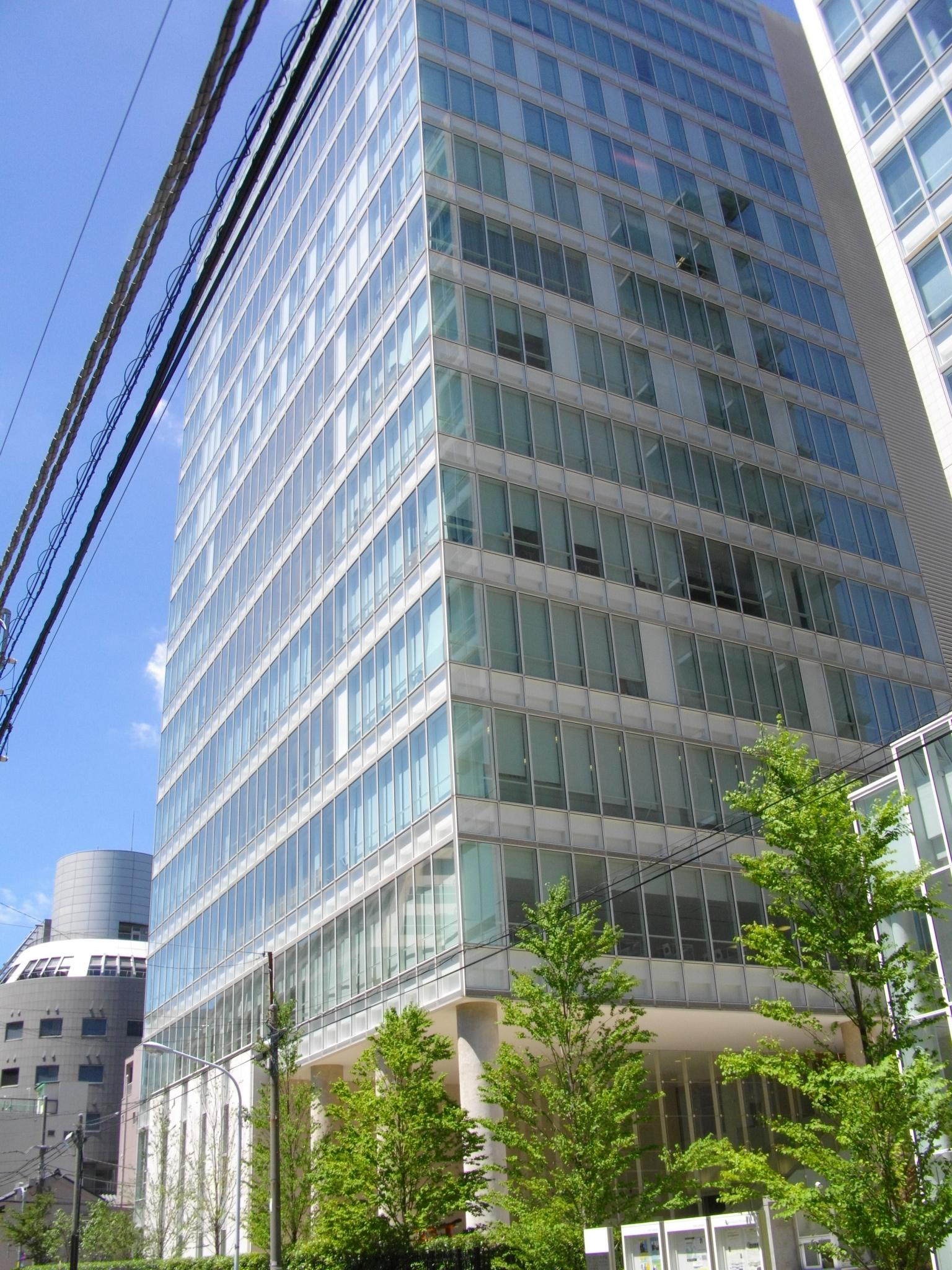
- Type: private
- Established: 1952
- Location: Taitō, Tokyo, Japan
- Website: www.uenogakuen.ac.jp/college

Ueno Gakuen Junior College (上野学園大学短期大学部, Ueno Gakuen Daigaku Tanki Daigakubu) is a private junior college for women in Taitō, Tokyo, Japan. It was established in 1952 in Taitō, Tokyo, then moved to Sōka, Saitama, before moving back to Taitō, Tokyo in 2005.

== See also ==
- List of junior colleges in Japan
