= Japan Professional School of Education =

Coordinates: 35°41′42.1″N 139°46′4″E

Japan Professional School of Education (日本教育大学院大学, Nihon kyōiku daigaku-in gakuin daigaku) was a private university in Chiyoda, Tokyo, Japan, established in 2006.

== Access ==
The reception area is located on the 9th floor of the Z-kai Ochanomizu Building (Z会御茶ノ水ビル). It is a quick 1-minute walk from Exit A2 of Awajichō Station on the Tokyo Metro Marunouchi Line and Ogawamachi Station on the Toei Shinjuku Line. It is about 2 minutes by foot from Exit A4 of Shin-Ochanomizu Station on the Tokyo Metro Chiyoda Line. It takes about 7 minutes to walk from JR Kanda Station on the Yamanote Line.
