= Osaka Seikei College =

- 大阪成蹊短期大学
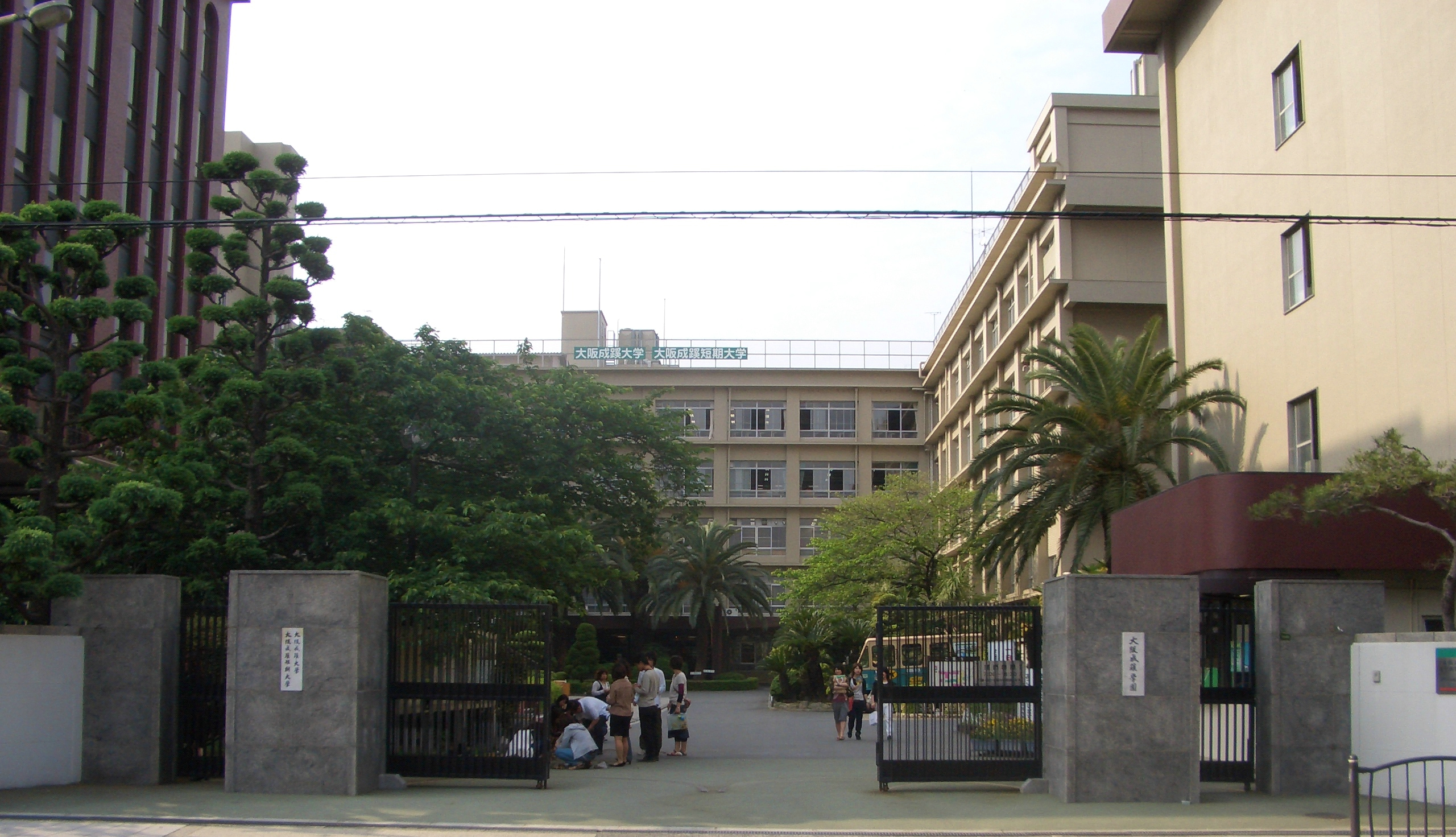
- Main gate
- Type: Private, Junior college
- Established: 1933
- Parent institution: Osaka Seikei Gakuen
- Location: Higashiyodogawa-ku, Osaka, Japan; 34°45′33.6″N 135°32′13.9″E
- Campus: Urban
- Website: tandai.osaka-seikei.jp
- Location within Osaka Prefecture

Osaka Seikei College (大阪成蹊短期大学, Ōsaka seikei tanki daigaku) is a private junior college in Higashiyodogawa-ku, Osaka, Osaka Prefecture, Japan. The precursor of the school was founded in 1933, and it was chartered as a university in 1951.

== See also ==
- Osaka Seikei University
