= August Karl Reischauer =

American Presbyterian missionary

August Karl Reischauer ((オーガスト・カール・ライシャワー); born September 4, 1879; died July 10, 1971) was an American Presbyterian missionary, best known for his work in Japan.

== Life and work ==
August Karl Reischauer was born in Jonesboro, Illinois. He graduated from Hanover College in 1902 and from McCormick Theological Seminary in Chicago in 1905 before going to Japan.

His interest in the relationship of Christianity to the other religions led to the publication "Studies in Japanese Buddhism" in 1917. He also worked on eliminating duplication of missionary activities and consolidating the church seminaries. In 1918 he founded the Tōkyō Woman’s Christian University and in 1920, together with his wife, the school for the deaf and mute “Nihon Rōwa Gakkō” (日本聾話学校).

Reischauer left Japan in 1941 and taught for a number of years Comparative Religious Studies at Union Theological Seminary in New York City.

His first son was Robert Karl Reischauer (1907-1937), who was a scholar on Japanese culture and was killed during the Japanese invasion of Shanghai. His second son, Edwin O. Reischauer, was a well-known Japanologist and from 1961 to 1966 Ambassador of the United States in Japan.

== Published monographs ==
- Studies in Japanese Buddhism (1917)
- The Task in Japan: A Study of Modern Missionary Imperatives (1926)
- Ōjō yōshū - Collected Essays on Birth into Paradise (1930) (translation) (Note: Ōjōyōshū (往生要集) was written in 985 by the Buddhist monk Genshin (源信; 942-1017).)

== Literature ==
- S. Noma (Ed.): Reischauer, August Karl. In: Japan. An Illustrated Encyclopedia. Kodansha, 1993, ISBN 4-06-205938-X, p. 1250.
