= Kogyokusha College of Technology =

Coordinates: 35.6245°N 139.7132°E

- 攻玉社工科短期大学
- Type: Private junior college
- Active: 1950–2008
- Location: Shinagawa, Tokyo, Japan

Kogyokusha College of Technology (攻玉社工科短期大学, Kōgyokusha Kōka Tanki Daigaku) was a private junior college in Shinagawa, Tokyo, Japan.

== History ==
The college opened in April 1950, but the predecessor of the school was founded in 1880. It closed on December 19, 2008.

== Courses offered ==
It offered courses in civil engineering.

== See also ==
- List of junior colleges in Japan
