= Kobe City College of Nursing =

Coordinates: 34°41′11″N 135°03′09″E

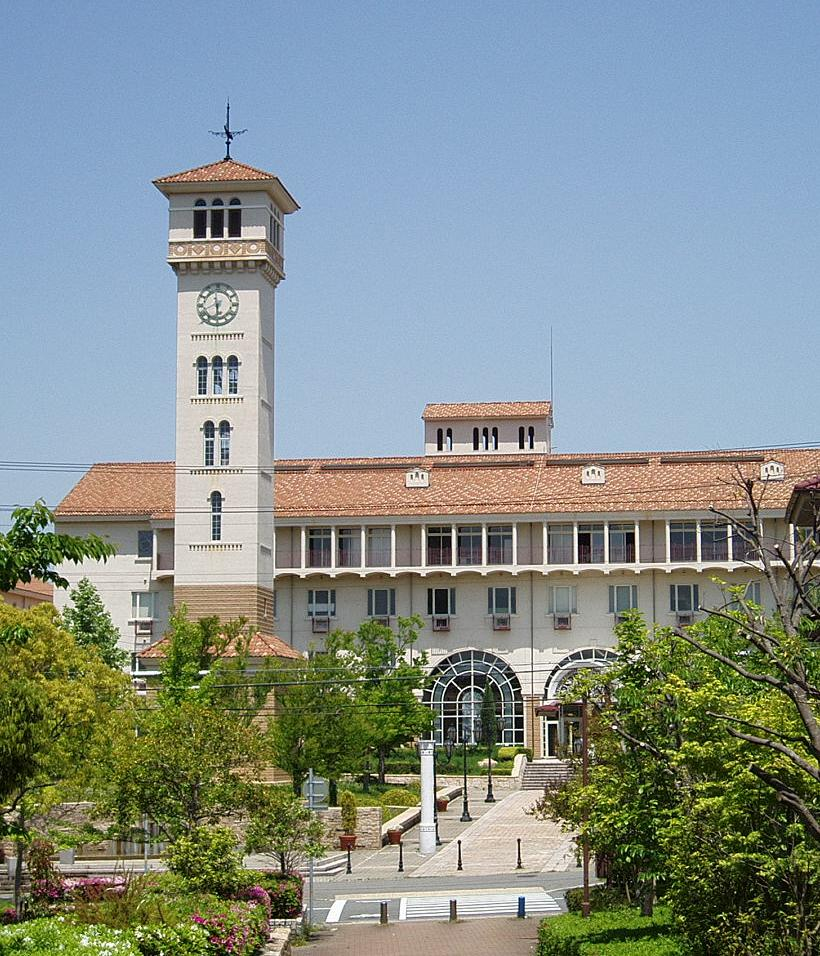
Entrance

Kobe City College of Nursing (神戸市看護大学, Kobe-shi kango daigaku) is a public university in Kobe, Hyōgo, Japan. The predecessor of the school was founded in 1959, and it was chartered as a university in 1996.
