= Teisei Gakuen Junior College =

Coordinates: 35°42′53.9″N 139°44′16.4″E

- 貞静学園短期大学
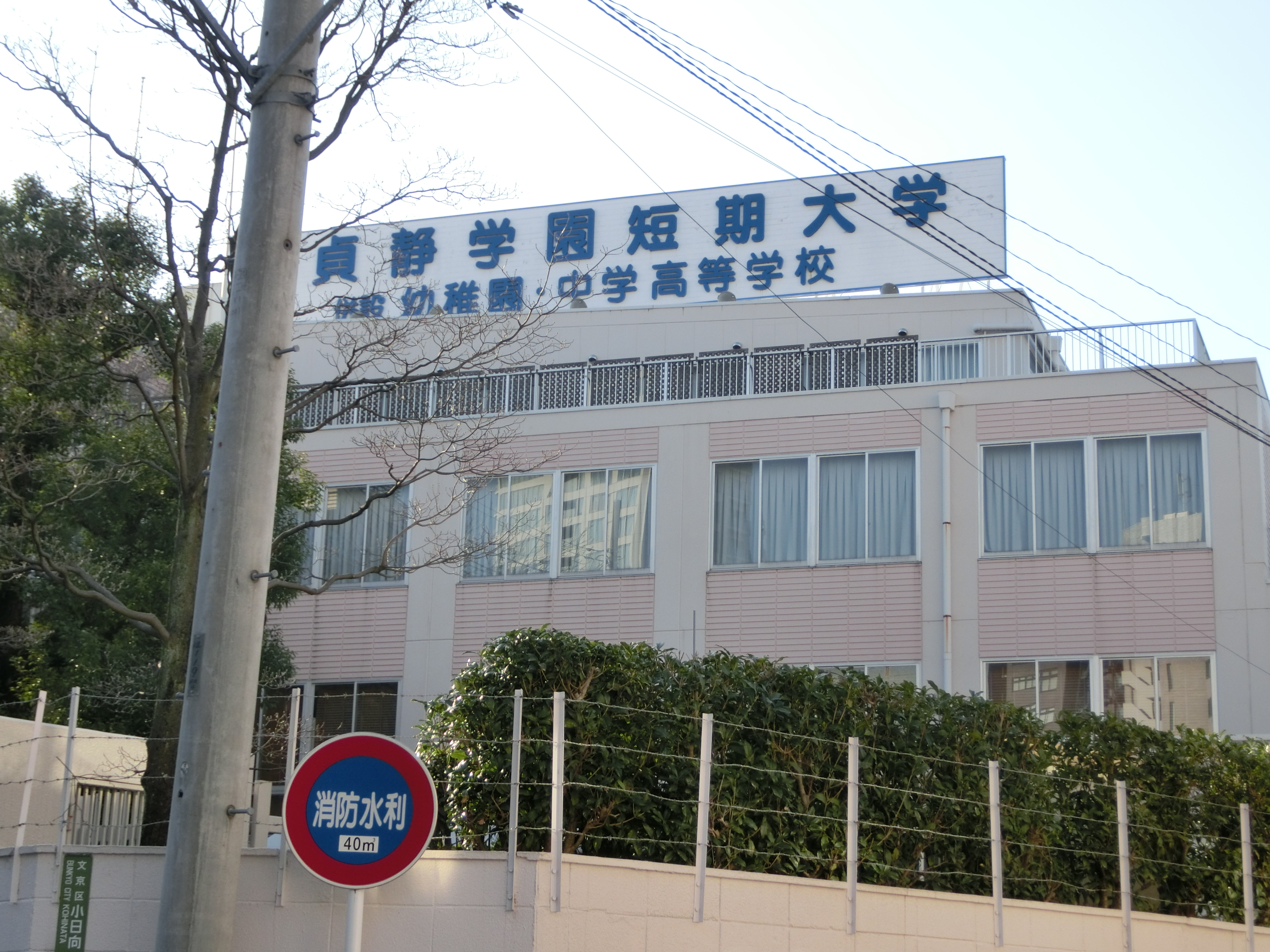
- Established: 1930
- President: Akiko Oku
- Faculty: Childcare
- Location: Bunkyo，Tokyo, Japan

Teisei Gakuen Junior College (貞静学園短期大学, Teisei Gakuen Tanki Daigaku) is a junior college in Tokyo, Japan, and is part of the Teisei Gakuen network.

The institute was founded in 1930 by Maki Takahashi, developed as a Junior College in 2009.
