= Yamanashi Prefectural University =

Higher education institution in Yamanashi Prefecture, Japan

Coordinates: 35°39′49.50″N 138°33′22.5″E

- 山梨県立大学
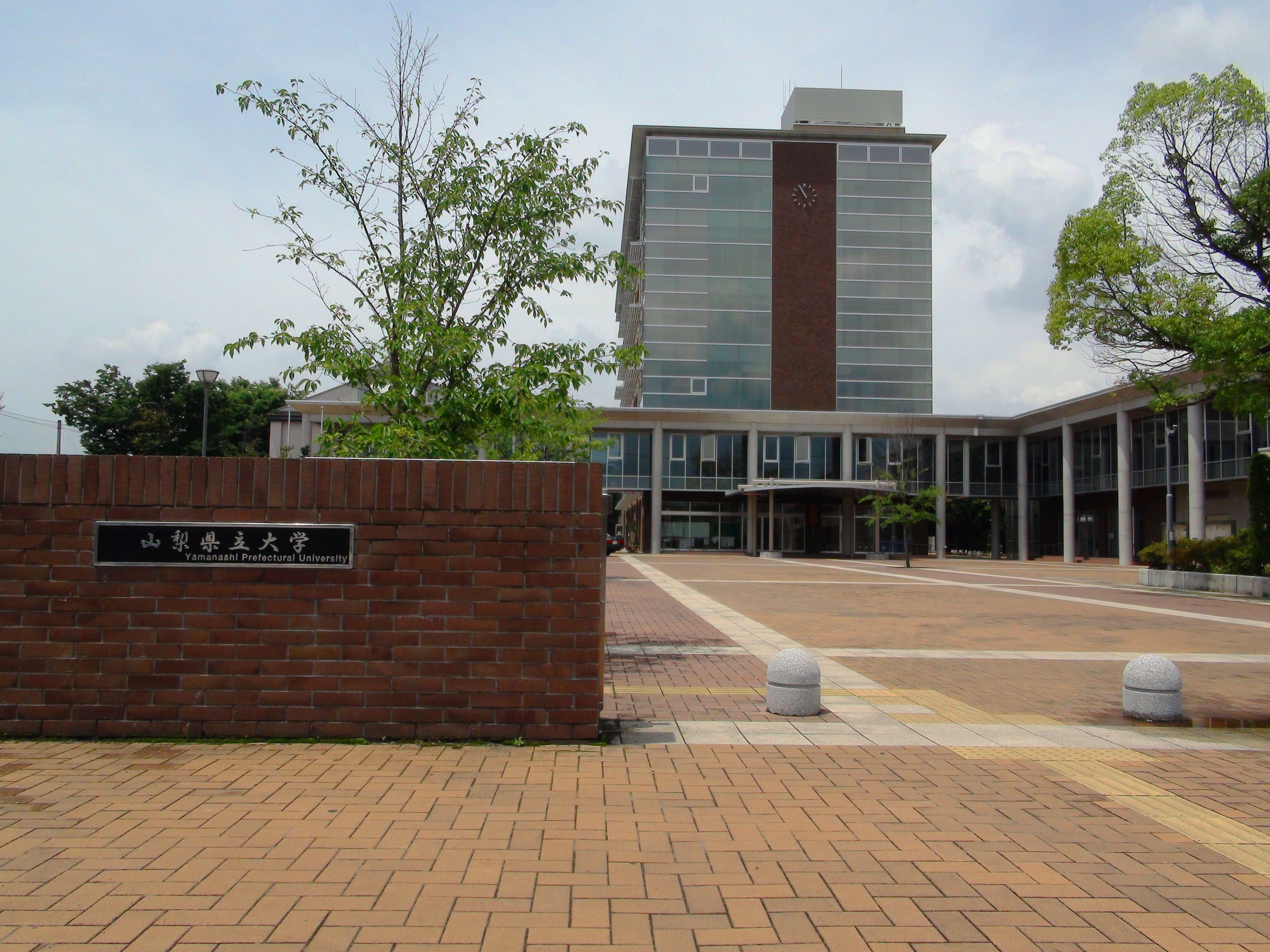
- Type: Public
- Established: 2005
- President: Kazuhiko Shimizu
- Location: Kofu, Yamanashi, Japan

Yamanashi Prefectural University (山梨県立大学, Yamanashi kenritsu daigaku) is a public university in Kōfu, Yamanashi Prefecture, Japan. The university was established in 2005 as a result of the merger of Yamanashi College of Nursing and Yamanashi Women's Junior College.

== Undergraduate Program ==
- School of International Policy
  - Department of General Policy
  - Department of International Communication
- School of Human welfare
  - Department of Community Welfare
  - Department of human formation
- School of Nursing
  - Department of Nursing

== Graduate Program ==
- Graduate School of Nursing
  - Department of Nursing
