= Toho Junior College of Music =

Coordinates: 35.7232°N 139.7315°E

- 東邦音楽短期大学
- Type: Private junior college
- Established: 1951
- Location: Bunkyo, Tokyo, Japan
- Website: www.toho-music.ac.jp/juniorcollege/

Toho Junior College of Music (東邦音楽短期大学, Tōhō Ongaku Tanki Daigaku) is a private junior college in Bunkyo, Tokyo, Japan.

== History ==
The college opened in April 1951, but the predecessor of the school, Mimurodo Education Group, was founded in 1938. The junior college is not attached to Toho College of Music.
