= Paul Stebbings =

British actor and theatre director

Christopher Paul Stebbings is a British actor and the artistic director of TNT Theater Britain (known in Japan as the International Theater Company London) and the American Drama Group Europe.

== Early life and education ==
Stebbings was born in Nottingham and studied drama at Bristol University. He trained in the Grotowski method with Triple Action Theatre in Britain and Poland.

== Career ==
Stebbings founded TNT theatre in 1980 and received Arts Council funding for work in the UK. He acted for Nottingham Playhouse and TNT and directed and written for South Yorkshire Theatre; Paragon Ensemble, Glasgow; Tams Theatre, Munich; the St. Petersburg State comedy Theatre, the Athens Concert Hall, Megaron; andfor Teatro Espressivo in Costa Rica where his adaptation of Dickens' Christmas Carol "Cuenta de Navidad" is performed each year.

Stebbings' three productions for the Shanghai Dramatic Arts Centre remain in their regular repertoire: The Taming of the Shrew, Oliver Twist and The Murder of Sherlock Holmes. TNT theatre tours three to four times a year throughout much of China, produced by Beijing-based Milky Way Paul Stebbings work in China is featured extensively in Nancy Pellegrini's book The People's Bard

His productions tour in Europe, Asia, Central America and the Middle East. Festival appearances include the Wizard of Jazz at the Munich Biennale, the Off-Broadway Festival in New York City, and performances at the Edinburgh Festival of The Murder of Sherlock Holmes, in which he played the title role. In 2017, he directed Julius Caesar in Schlegel's German translation at the Munich Glyptothek. His play about the Syrian Civil War and the refugee crisis, My Sister Syria, toured Europe in 2017 and 2018. in 2019 his Spanish version of Lord of the Flies premiered in Costa Rica and toured to Peru. In 2021 he co-wrote the musical Frankenstein with composer Christian Auer for the Deutsches theater Munich. His production of Othello toured to 60 European castles and palaces in 2022 and closed the Royal Jubilee celebrations at Balmoral castle. His productions of Romeo & Juliet and Macbeth toured Latin America from Mexico to Chile in spring 2023 where he received a Ministry of Culture award in Peru.

Stebbings lives in Munich with his wife, Angelika, a television executive.

== Honours ==
He was appointed Member of the Order of the British Empire (MBE) in the 2013 Birthday Honours for services to promoting British theatre and furthering British cultural interests in Asia.

== Productions and publications ==
- TNT The New Theatre - The ideas, adventures and productions of TNT theatre by Paul Stebbings and Phil Smith. Published by Triarchy Press UK 2020. https://www.triarchypress.net/tnt.html
- Macbeth
- One Flew Over the Cuckoo's Nest
- Brave New World
- Moon Palace
- Fahrenheit 451
- A Midsummer Night's Dream
- Hamlet
- The Taming of the Shrew
- Gulliver's Travels: A Satirical Science-Fiction Adventure
- Harlequin (later retitled Glasnost Harlequin)
- The Charlie Chaplin Putsch
- Twelfth Night
- The Life and Death of Martin Luther King
- Free Mandela (new play by Paul Stebbings and Phil Smith) 2020
- Othello 2020 - 2022
- Cuenta de Navidad 2007 - 2022
- Frankenstein the rock musical 2021 [17]

==External links==

- TNT theatre
