= Osaka Seikei University =

University in Osaka, Japan

- 大阪成蹊大学
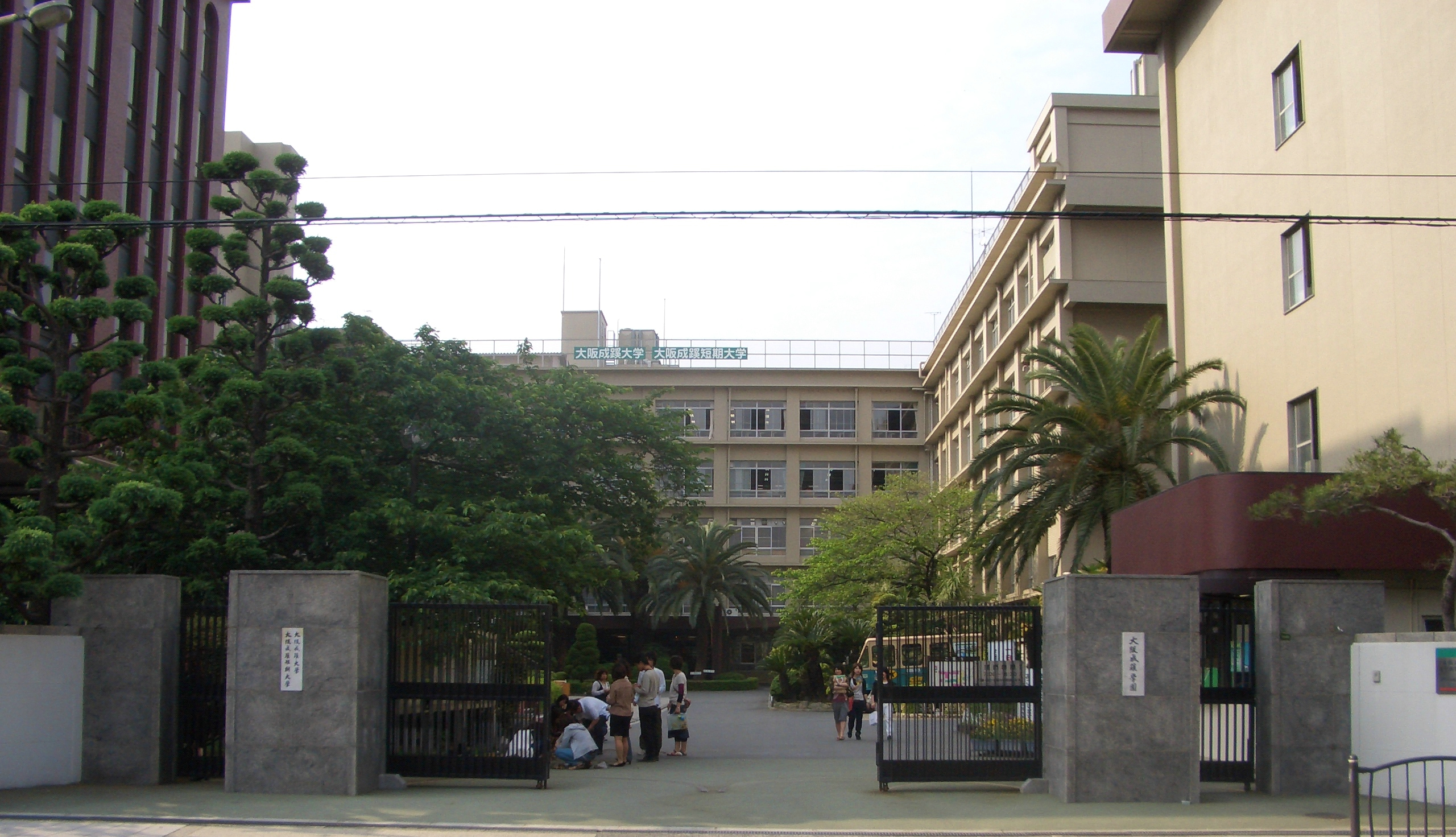
- Main gate
- Type: Private
- Established: 1951
- Parent institution: Osaka Seikei Gakuen
- Location: Higashiyodogawa-ku, Osaka, Japan; 34°45′33.9″N 135°32′14.7″E
- Campus: Urban
- Website: univ.osaka-seikei.jp
- Location within Osaka Prefecture

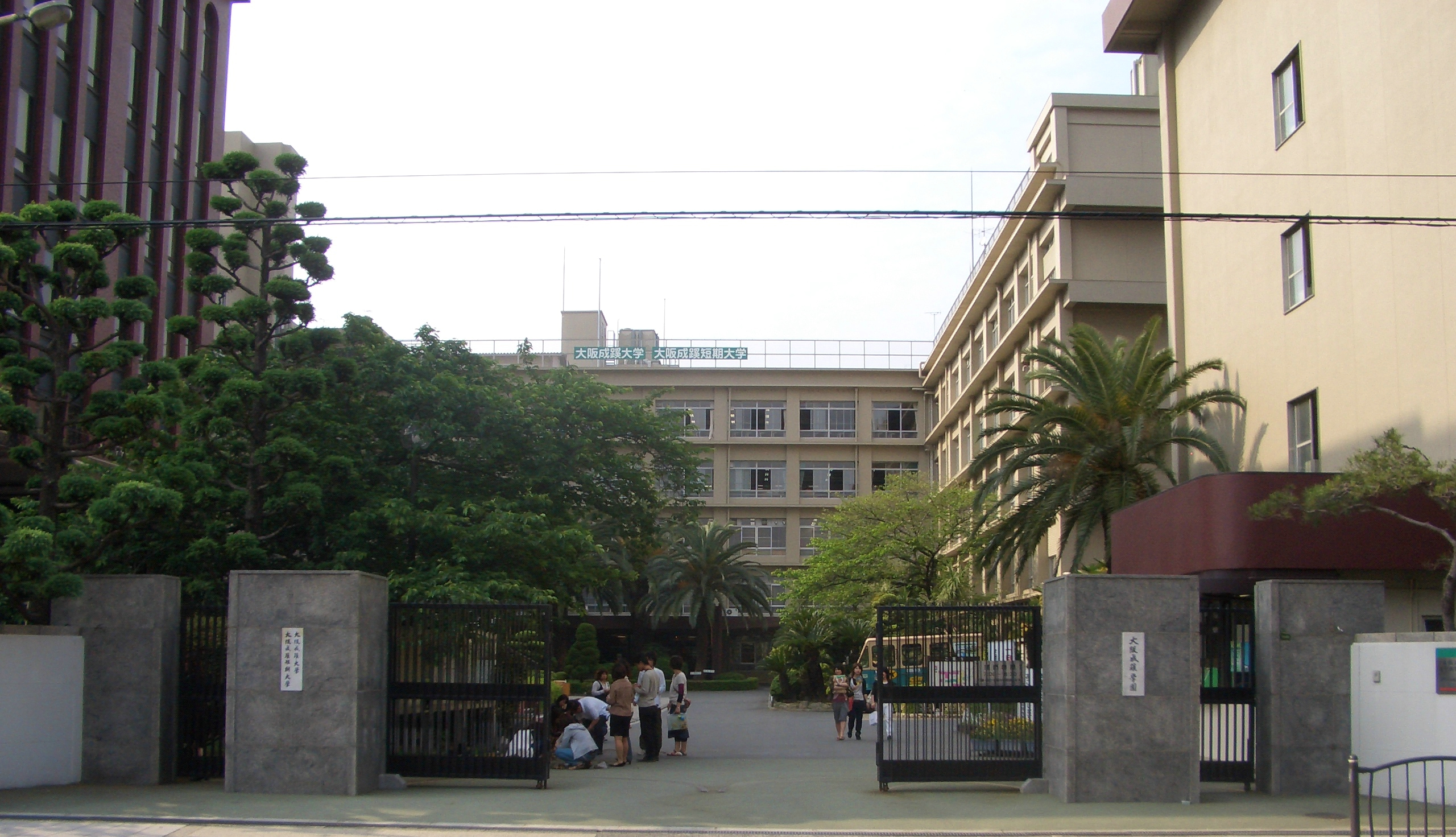
Osaka Seikei University.

Osaka Seikei University (大阪成蹊大学, Ōsaka seikei daigaku) is a private university in Osaka, Japan. The predecessor of the school was founded in 1933. It was chartered as a junior women's college in 1951. In 2003 it became coeducational.

== Faculties ==
This university has the following faculties:

Faculty of Management

- Department of Management
- Department of Sports Management
- Department of Global Tourism and Business

Faculty of Arts

- Department of Art and Design

Faculty of Education

- Department of Education

== See also ==
- Osaka Seikei College
- Biwako Seikei Sport College
