= Paula Berwanger =

Brazilian actress (born 1990)

- Born: Paula Migueles Berwanger; Rio de Janeiro, Rio de Janeiro, Brazil
- Education: Pontifical Catholic University of Rio de Janeiro
- Occupations: Actress, model, producer
- Years active: 2013–present

Paula Migueles Berwanger (born June 26, 1990) is a Spanish–Brazilian actress, model and producer. She is known for portraying Ruth Paine in NHK's Special 'Unsolved Cases File.08 JFK assassination', on demand on NHK World., and for playing the athlete Corina in Hulu series 「シロでもクロでもない世界で、パンダは笑う。」 ('Panda laughs in a world that is neither white nor black')

== Early life ==
Berwanger was born in Rio de Janeiro, Brazil and moved to Japan with her parents at a young age. She began modeling professionally in Japan at age two until she returned to Brazil, where she started acting.

== Career ==
Berwanger worked on national television shows in Brazil on channels GNT and Gloob, of the Globosat Group. At the age of twenty-five, she moved to New York City where she graduated in acting from the renowned William Esper Studio and produced her first play, Bernard Shaw's Village Wooing. She later returned to Japan where she mainly acts in English and Japanese, but also in Portuguese and Spanish.

In Japan, Berwanger started playing the regular character Julia in NHK's educational TV show 'おもてなしの基礎英語' (Basic English for Hospitality) in 2018 and since then found a market for playing foreign roles in Japanese television drama series such as 'Sherlock: Untold Stories', on Fuji Television, 'Unsolved Cases File.08 JFK assassination', on NHK World and 'Panda laughs in a world that is neither white nor black', on Hulu.

Berwanger is also the current producer for the International Theater Company London in Japan through StagePlay Japan, having produced their Romeo and Juliet tour in 2018 and A Midsummer Night's Dream tour in 2019.
