= Takachiho University =

Private university in Tokyo, Japan

Coordinates: 35°40′49.39″N 139°38′36.16″E

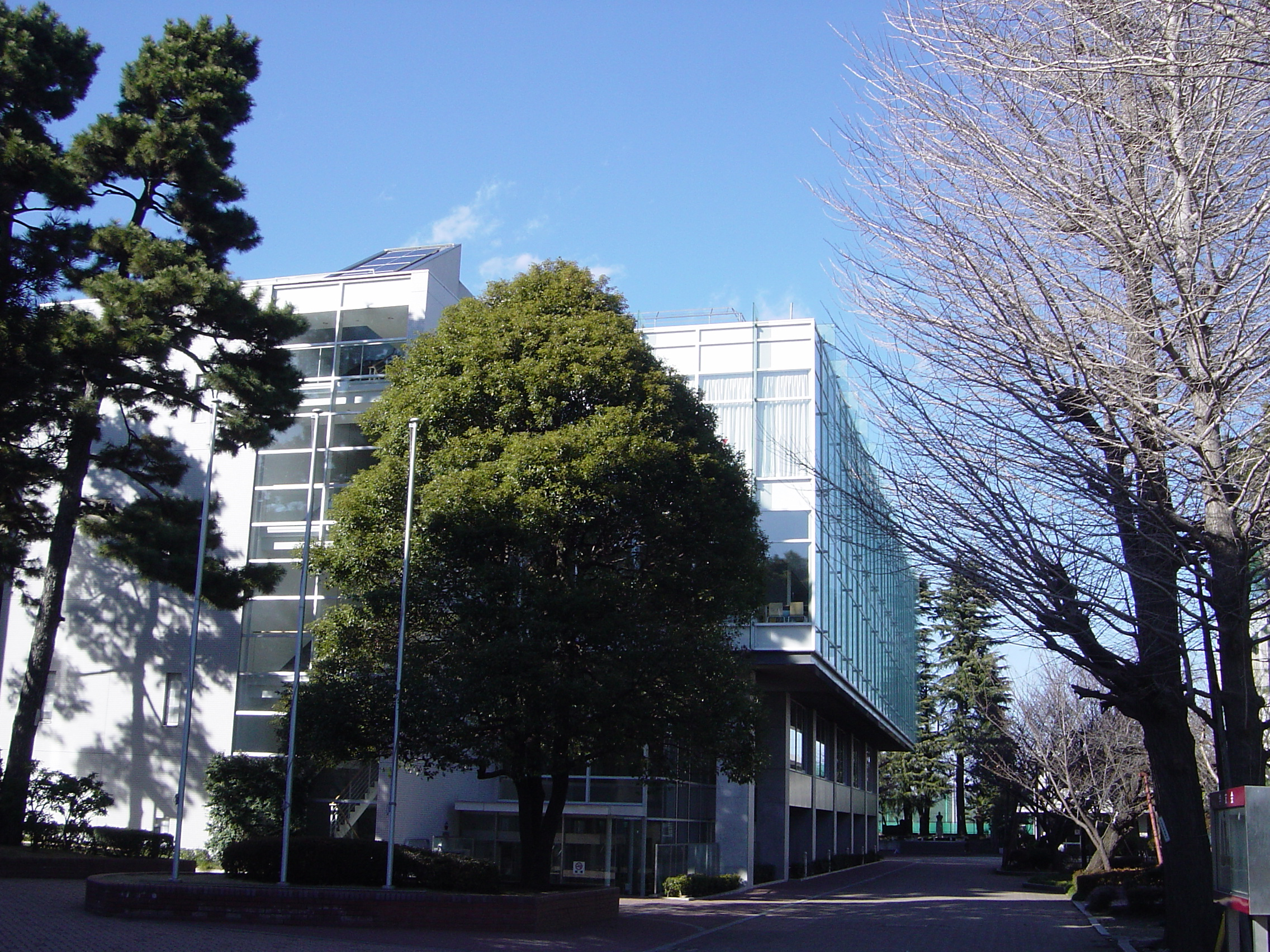
Takachiho University

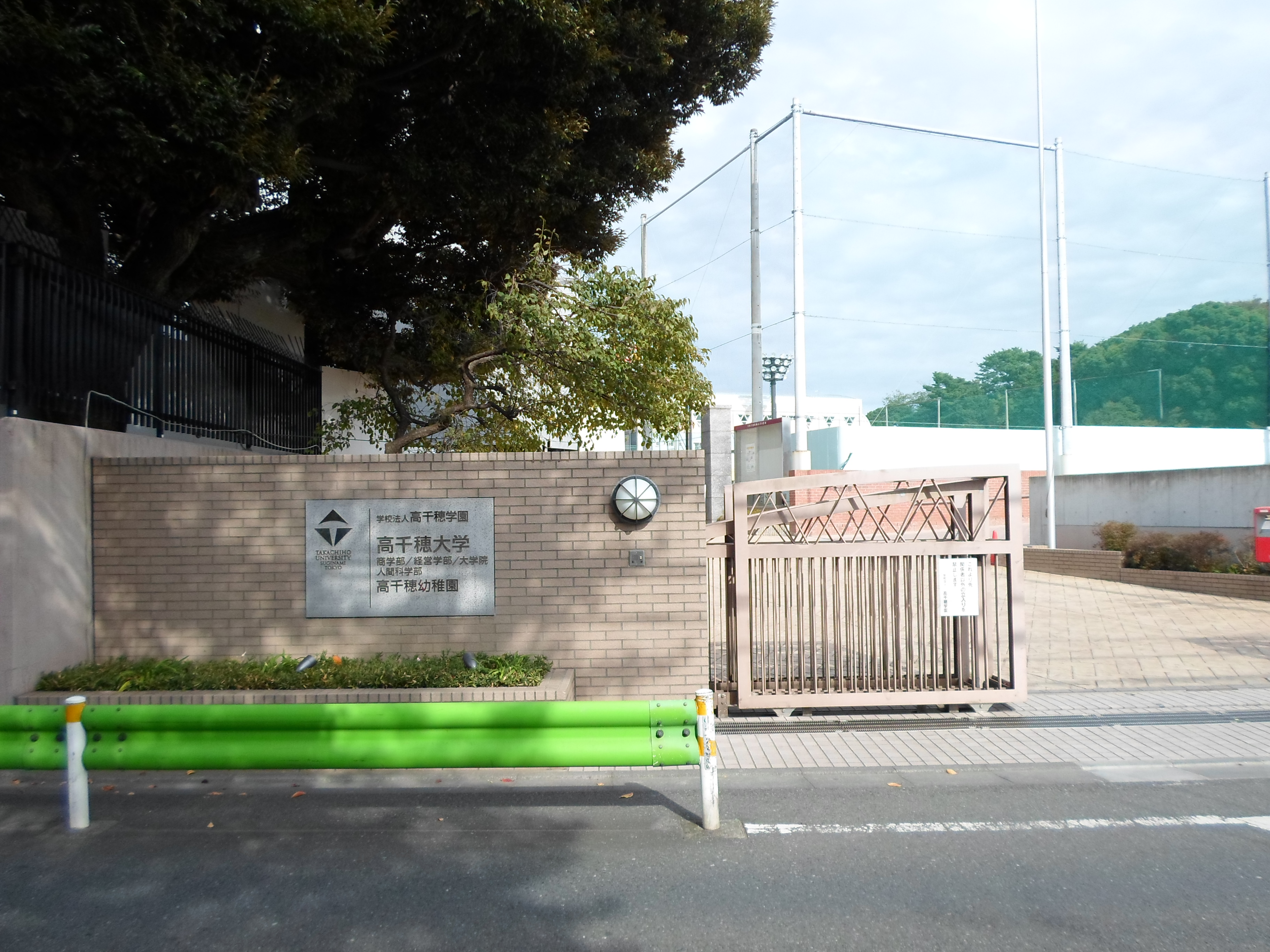
Takachiho University

Takachiho University (高千穂大学, Takachiho daigaku) is a private university in Suginami, Tokyo, Japan, established in 1950. The predecessor of the school was founded in 1903.

This university is called "Edo University of Commerce" in Gregory S. Poole's book The Japanese Professor: An Ethnography of a University Faculty (Sense Publishers, 2010. ISBN 978-94-6091-154-5).
