= International Theater Company London =

The International Theater Company London (ITCL) is a theatrical company that performs in Japan since 1992. It is a collaboration between TNT Theater Britain, The American Drama Group Europe and Stageplay Japan.

== Background ==
TNT, The New Theater, was founded in the 1980s. Later, TNT's artistic director MBE Paul Stebbings joined with ADG-Europe. In Japan, the tour is produced by StagePlay Japan, a production company led by producer Paulo Berwanger and his daughter Paula Berwanger.

In 2019, they performed A Midsummer Night's Dream, which was their 46th performance in Japan. As Paul Stebbings describes the troupe: We have always been travelling players, influenced by styles and theories of theater that are not British or even restricted to one country.

== Productions ==
- A Midsummer Night's Dream
- Romeo and Juliet
- Twelfth Night
- The Tempest
- The Merchant of Venice
- The Taming of the Shrew
- King Lear
- Macbeth
- David Copperfield
- Much Ado About Nothing
- Pygmalion
- Othello
- A Christmas Carol
- The Canterville Ghost
- Hamlet
- Animal Farm
- Frankenstein
- Oliver Twist
- 1984
- The Fall of the House of Usher, The Tell-Tale Heart and The Pit and Pendulum
- The Picture of Dorian Gray
- Dr. Jekyll and Mr. Hyde
- Brave New World
- A Streetcar Named Desire
- Gulliver's Travel
- Animal Farm
- The Murder of Sherlock Holmes
