= Tokyo Seitoku University =

University in Tokyo, Japan

Coordinates: 35°46′01″N 139°44′20″E

- 東京成徳大学; Tōkyō seitoku daigaku
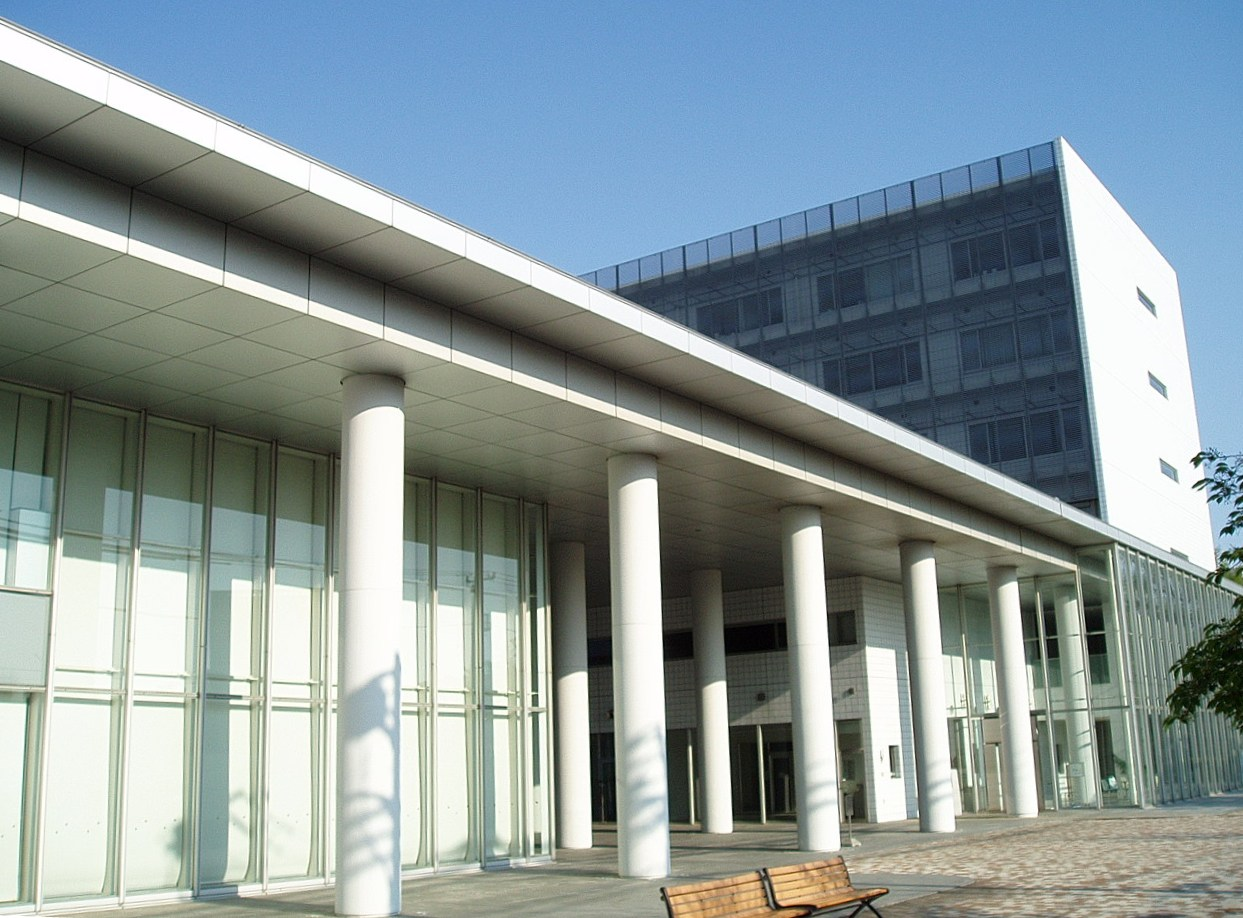
- Jujodai Campus
- Type: Private
- Established: 1993
- Location: Kita, Tokyo, Japan
- Website: Official website

Tokyo Seitoku University (東京成徳大学, Tōkyō seitoku daigaku) is a private university in Kita, Tokyo, Japan, established in 1993.

The Tokyo Seitoku University Jyujo campus hosts departments for childcare, business administration and international relations. Additional departments of humanities and applied psychology are located in Yachiyo City, Chiba.
