= Azalea =

Subgroup of rhododendron flowering shrubs

Azaleas (/əˈzeɪliə/ ə-ZAY-lee-ə) are flowering shrubs in the genus Rhododendron, particularly the former subgenera Tsutsusi (evergreen) and Pentanthera (deciduous). Azaleas bloom in the spring (April and May in the temperate Northern Hemisphere, and October and November in the Southern Hemisphere), their flowers often lasting several weeks. Shade tolerant, they prefer living near or under trees. They are part of the family Ericaceae.

== Cultivation ==
Plant enthusiasts have selectively bred azaleas for hundreds of years. This human selection has produced thousands of different cultivars which are propagated by cuttings. Azalea seeds can also be collected and germinated.

Azaleas are generally slow-growing and do best in well-drained acidic soil (4.5–6.0 pH). Fertilizer needs are low. Some species need regular pruning.

Azaleas are native to several continents including Asia, Europe and North America. They are planted abundantly as ornamentals in the southeastern US, southern Asia, and parts of southwest Europe.

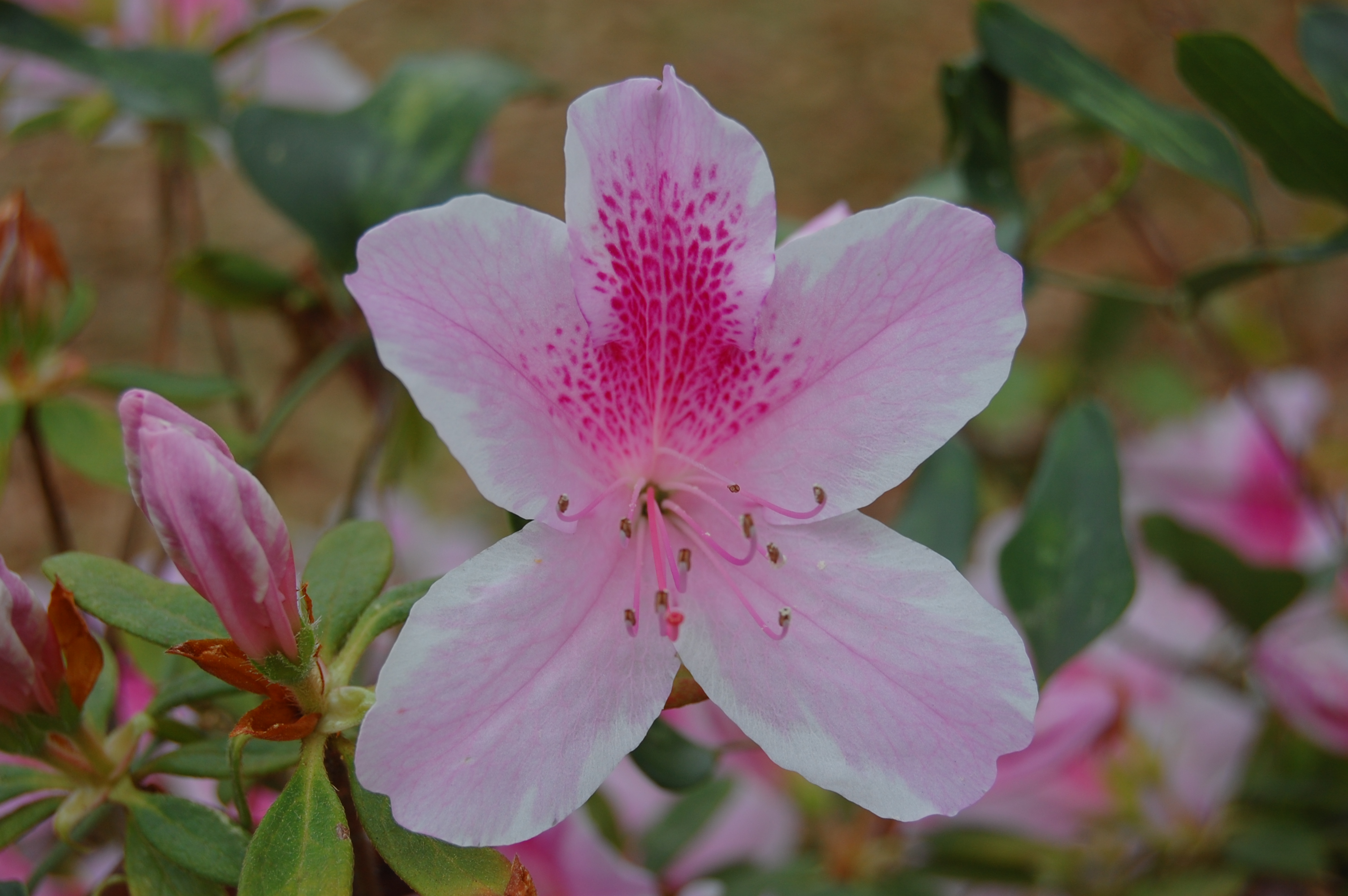
cv. 'George Taber'

According to azalea historian Fred Galle, in the United States, Azalea indica (in this case, the group of plants called Southern indicas) was first introduced to the outdoor landscape in the 1830s at the rice plantation Magnolia-on-the-Ashley in Charleston, South Carolina. From Philadelphia, where they were grown only in greenhouses, John Grimke Drayton (Magnolia's owner) imported the plants for use in his estate garden. With encouragement from Charles Sprague Sargent from Harvard's Arnold Arboretum, Magnolia Plantation and Gardens was opened to the public in 1871, following the American Civil War. Magnolia is one of the oldest public gardens in America.

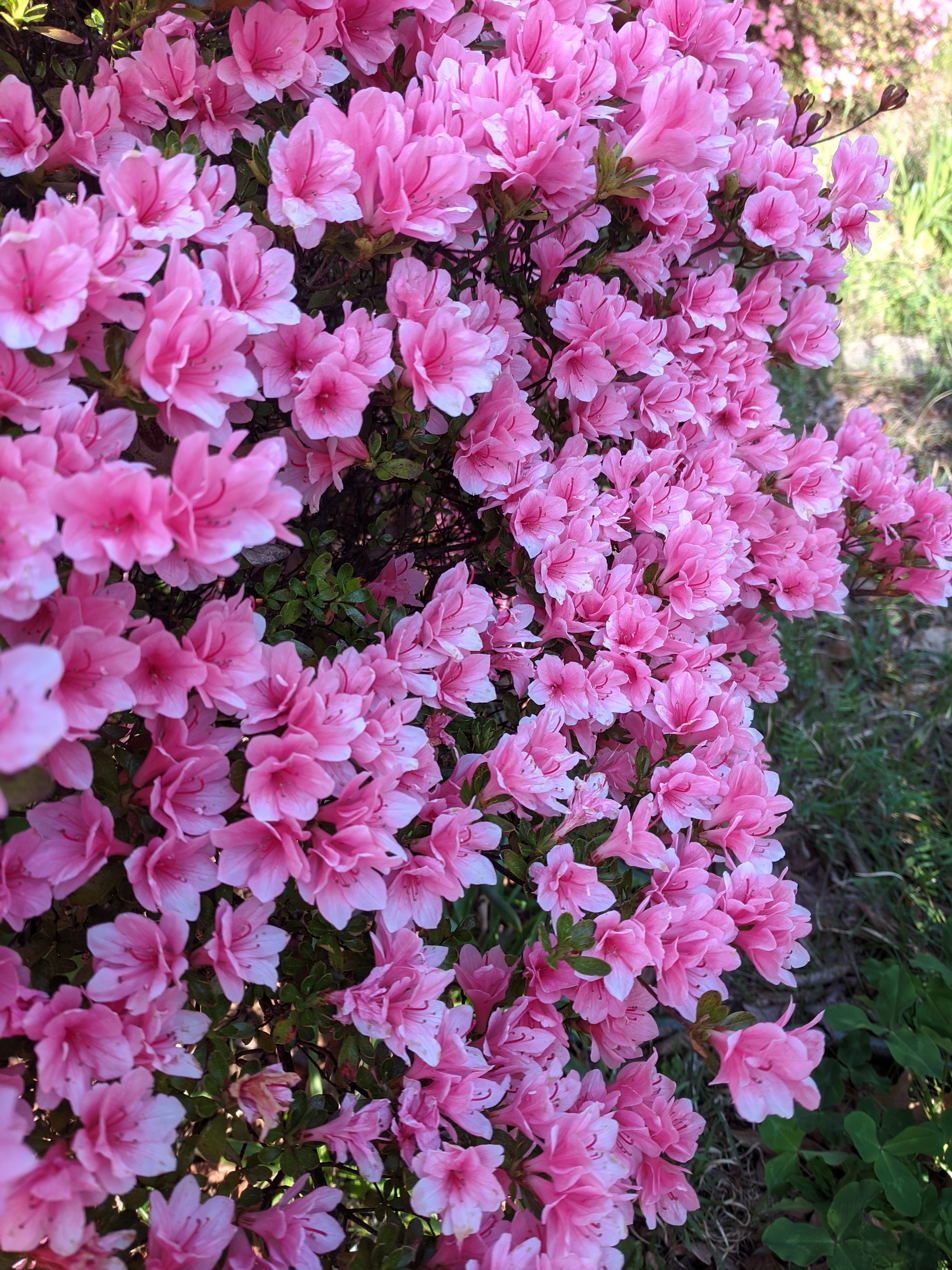
Thirty-year-old bush, Maryland, United States

== Disease ==
Azalea leafy gall can be particularly destructive to azalea leaves during the early spring. Hand picking infected leaves is the recommended method of control.

They can also be subject to Phytophthora root rot in moist, hot conditions.

Azaleas share the economically important disease Phytophthora cinnamomi with more than 3000 other plants.

== Pests ==
Azaleas share the Azalea lace bug (Stephanitis pyrioides) with many other heath species. Shrewsbury & Raupp 2000 find azaleas can be protected from them by companion planting with an overstory above them.

== Cultural significance and symbolism ==
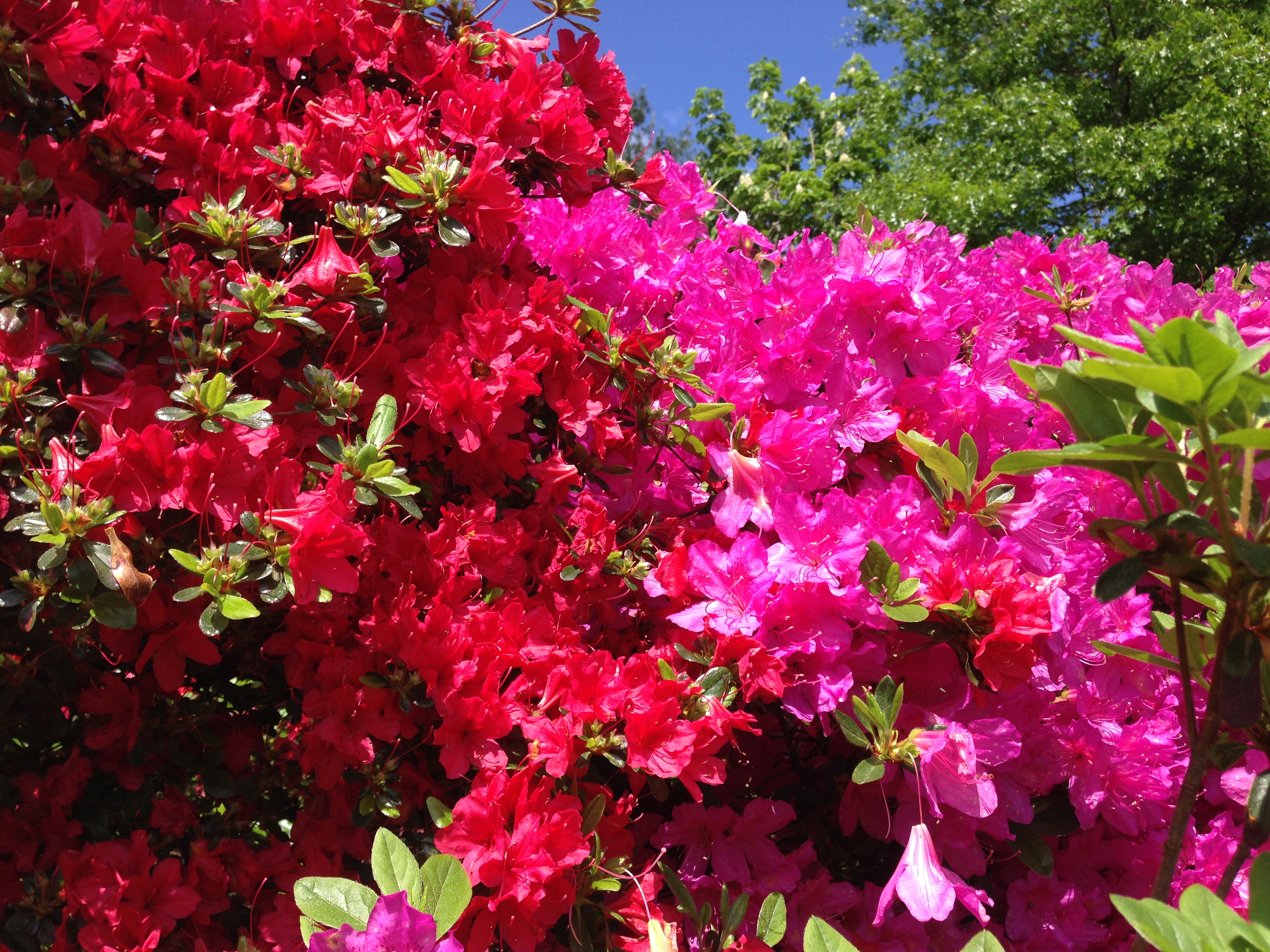
Azaleas, New Jersey, US

In Chinese culture, the azalea is known as sixiang shu (思乡树), meaning "homesickness tree" or "tree of longing for home," and is referenced in the poetry of Du Fu.

The azalea is also one of the symbols of the city of São Paulo, Brazil.

Azaleas and rhododendrons' toxic compounds, and their association with poisoning, has been reflected in historical accounts of floral symbolism. Presenting a bouquet of these flowers in a black vase was regarded as a death threat.

== Toxicity ==
In addition to being renowned for its beauty, the azalea is also highly toxic—it contains andromedotoxins in both its leaves and nectar, including honey from the nectar. Bees are deliberately fed on azalea/rhododendron nectar in some parts of Turkey, producing a mind-altering, potentially medicinal, and occasionally lethal honey known as "mad honey".

Azalea is dangerous to pets, as, if consumed, the toxins within the plant tissue can cause central nervous system depression, which in turn can lead to multi-organ failure. Symptoms may include vomiting, diarrhea, seizures, laryngeal edema and heart rhythm disturbances, which can lead to complete cardiac arrest and therefore death.

== Azalea festivals ==
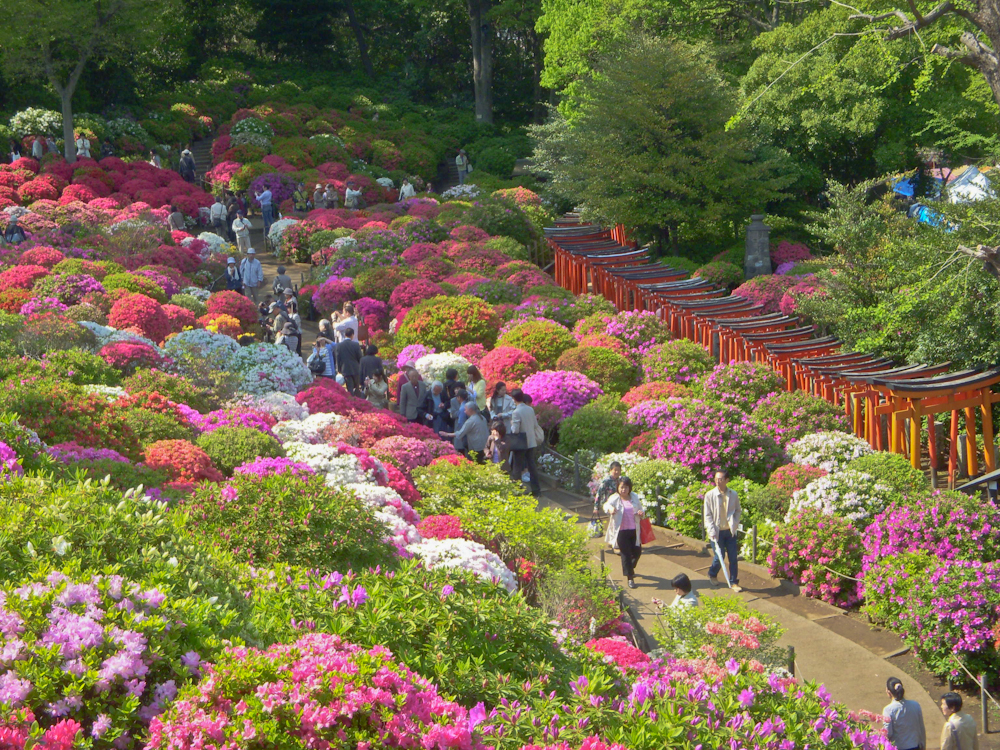
Azalea Festival at Nezu Shrine

=== Japan ===
Motoyama, Kōchi has a flower festival in which the blooming of Tsutsuji is celebrated. Tatebayashi, Gunma is famous for its Azalea Hill Park, Tsutsuji-ga-oka. Nezu Shrine in Bunkyo, Tokyo, holds a Tsutsuji Matsuri from early April until early May. Higashi Village has hosted an azalea festival each year since 1976. The village's 50,000 azalea plants draw an estimated 60,000 to 80,000 visitors each year.

=== Korea ===
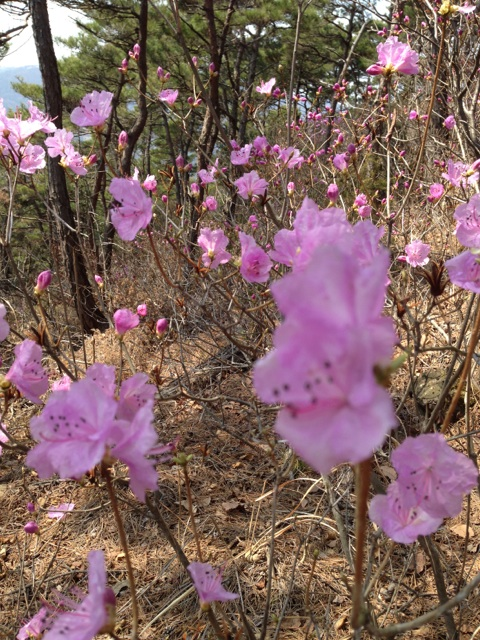
Azaleas in Korea

Sobaeksan, one of the 12 well-known Sobaek Mountains, lying on the border between Chungbuk Province and Gyeongbuk has a royal azalea (Rhododendron schlippenbachii) festival held on May every year. Sobaeksan has an azalea colony dotted around Biro mountaintop, Gukmang and Yonwha early in May. When royal azaleas have turned pink in the end of May, it looks like Sobaeksan wears a pink Jeogori (Korean traditional jacket).

=== Hong Kong ===
The Ma On Shan Azalea Festival is held in Ma On Shan, where six native species (Rhododendron championae, Rhododendron farrerae, Rhododendron hongkongense, Rhododendron moulmainense, Rhododendron simiarum and Rhododendron simsii) are found in the area. The festival has been held since 2004; it includes activities such as exhibitions, photo contests and carnivals.

=== United States ===
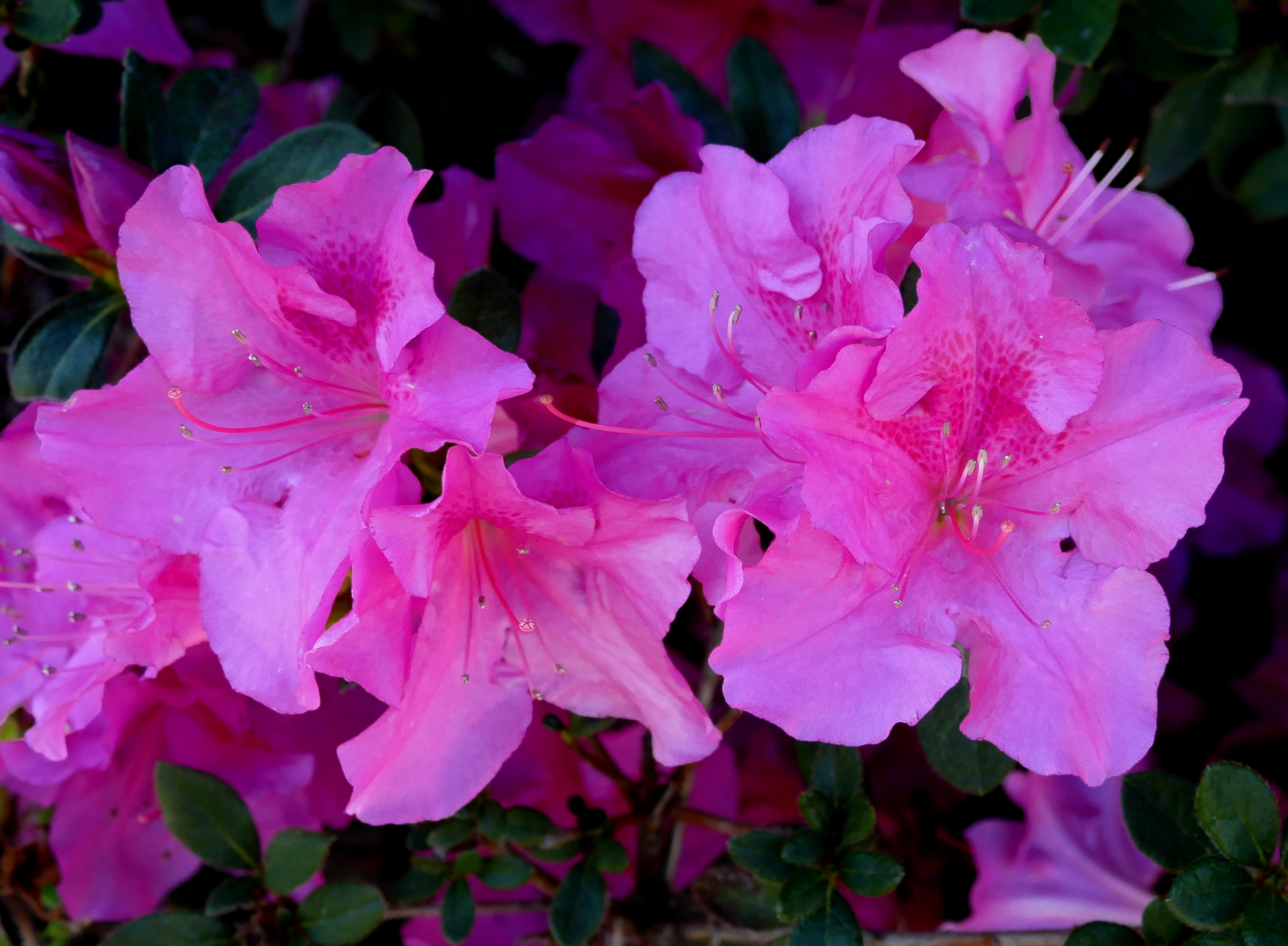
Azaleas

Many cities in the United States have festivals in the spring celebrating the blooms of the azalea, including Summerville, South Carolina; Hamilton, New Jersey; Mobile, Alabama; Jasper, Texas; Tyler, Texas; Norfolk, Virginia; Wilmington, North Carolina (North Carolina Azalea Festival); Valdosta, Georgia; Palatka, Florida (Florida Azalea Festival); Pickens, South Carolina; Muskogee, Oklahoma; Brookings, Oregon; and Nixa, Missouri.

The Azalea Trail is a designated path, planted with azaleas in private gardens, through Mobile, Alabama. The Azalea Trail Run is an annual road running event held there in late March. Mobile, Alabama is also home to the Azalea Trail Maids, fifty women chosen to serve as ambassadors of the city while wearing antebellum dresses, who originally participated in a three-day festival, but now operate throughout the year.

The Azalea Society of America designated Houston, Texas, an "azalea city". The River Oaks Garden Club has conducted the Houston Azalea Trail every spring since 1935.

Valdosta, Georgia is called the Azalea City, as the plant grows in profusion there. The city hosts an annual Azalea Festival in March.

== See also ==
- List of Award of Garden Merit rhododendrons
- List of plants poisonous to equines
