= Hon-komagome Station =

Metro station in Tokyo, Japan

Coordinates: 35.72454°N 139.753765°E

Hon-komagome Station 本駒込駅

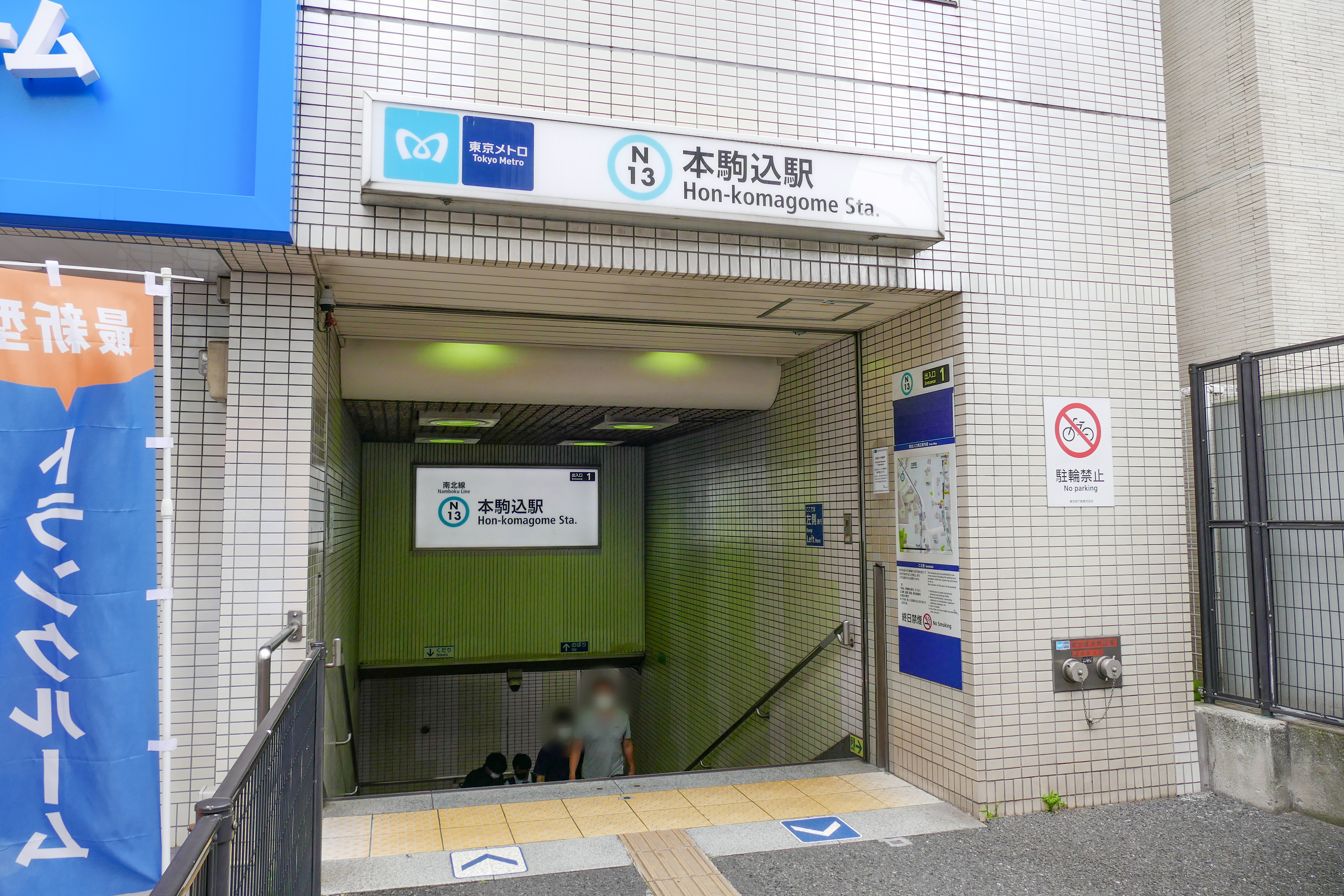
- No. 1 entrance, June 2022

General information
- Location: 2-37-1 Mukogaoka, Bunkyo, Tokyo （東京都文京区向丘2-37-1） Japan
- Operator: Tokyo Metro
- Line: Namboku Line
- Platforms: 1 island platform
- Tracks: 2
- Connections: Bus stop

Construction
- Structure type: Underground

Other information
- Station code: N-13

History
- Opened: 26 March 1996; 30 years ago

Passengers
- FY2019: 22,933 daily

Services
Preceding station	Tokyo Metro	Following station
Todaimae towards Meguro	Namboku Line	Komagome towards Akabane-iwabuchi
Location
- Location within Tokyo Yamanote Loop Location within Tokyo wards area Location within Japan

Hon-komagome Station (本駒込駅, Hon-komagome-eki) is a subway station on the Tokyo Metro Namboku Line in Bunkyo, Tokyo, Japan, operated by the Tokyo subway operator Tokyo Metro. It is numbered "N-13".

== Lines ==
Hon-komagome Station is served by the Tokyo Metro Namboku Line, and lies 13.6 km from the starting point of the line at Meguro. Many train services continue to and from Hiyoshi in Kanagawa Prefecture on the Tokyu Meguro Line in the south and to and from Urawa-Misono in Saitama Prefecture on the Saitama Rapid Railway Line in the north.

== Station layout ==
The station is an underground station, with the ticket machines and ticket barriers located on the first basement ("B1F") level, and the platforms on the third basement ("B3F") level.

=== Platforms ===
The station has an island platform serving two tracks.

1
Namboku Line
for Akabane-iwabuchi
Saitama Rapid Railway Line for Urawa-Misono
2
- for Shirokane-takanawa and Meguro
- Meguro Line for Hiyoshi
- Tokyu Shin-Yokohama Line for Shin-Yokohama Station
- Sotetsu Main Line for Ebina via the Tokyu/Sotetsu Shin-Yokohama Line

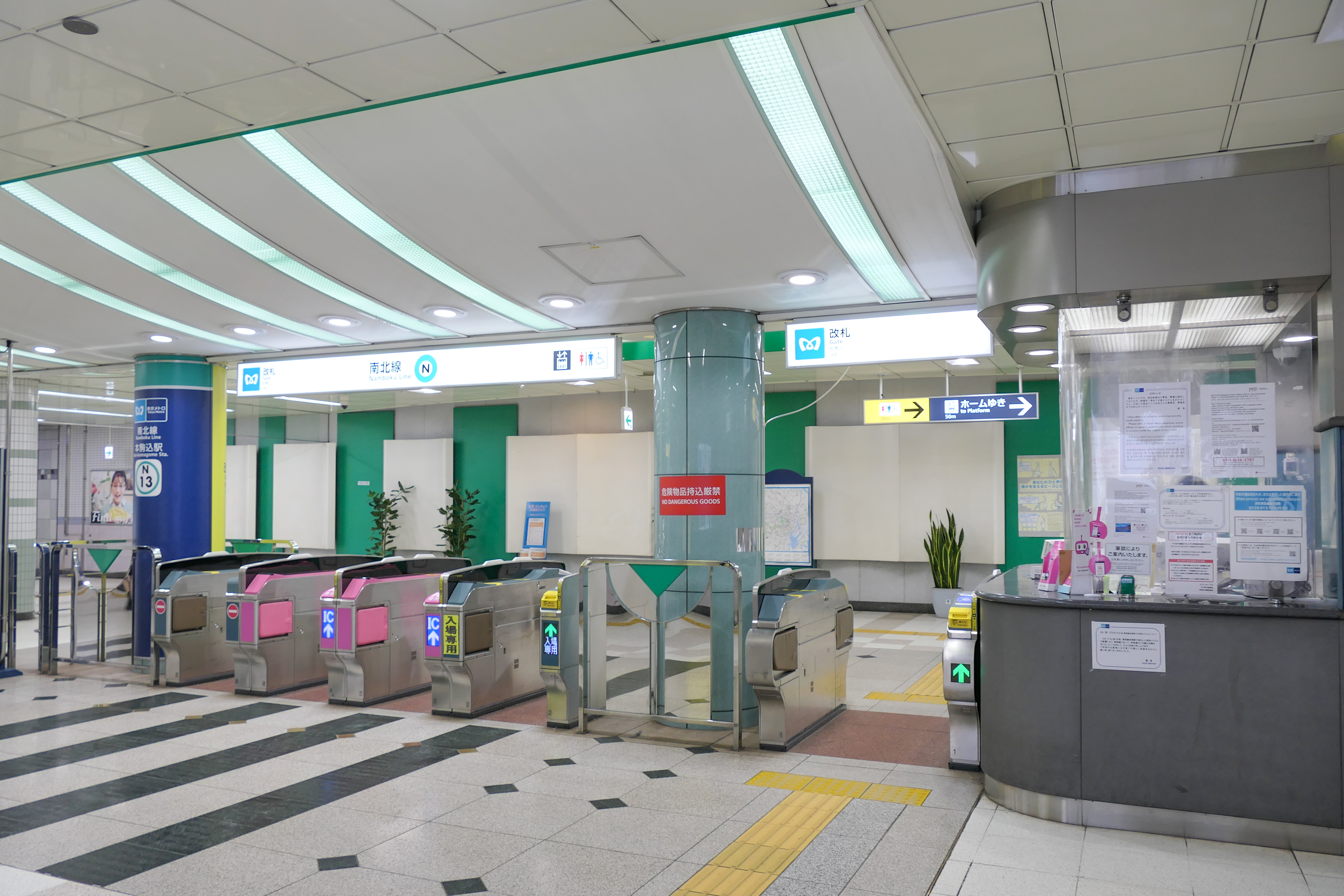
Ticket barriers (June 2022)

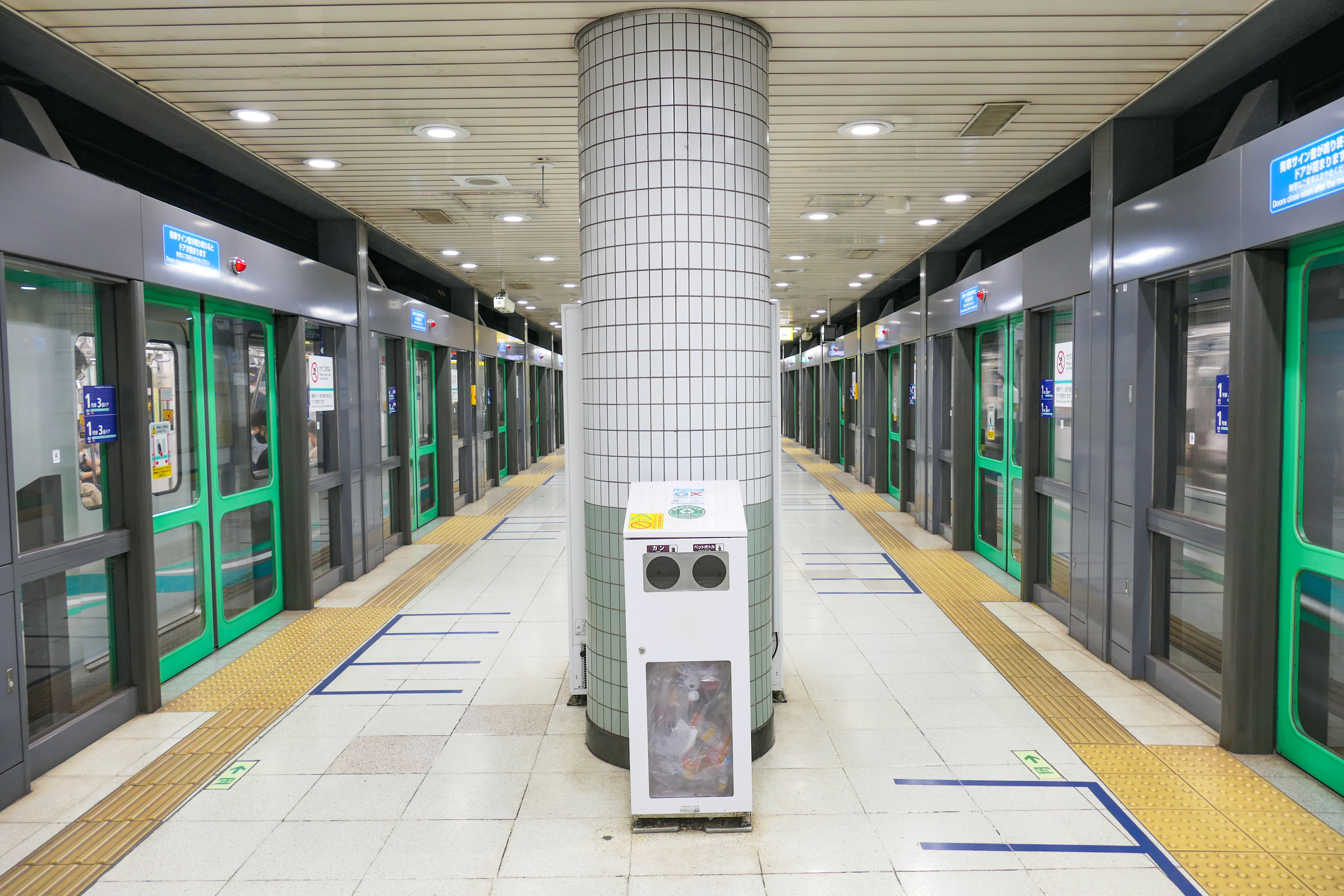
Station platforms (June 2022)

== History ==
Hon-komagome Station opened on 26 March 1996.

The station facilities were inherited by Tokyo Metro after the privatization of the Teito Rapid Transit Authority (TRTA) in 2004.

== Passenger statistics ==
In fiscal 2019, the station was used by an average of 22,933 passengers daily.

== Surrounding area ==
- Toyo University Hakusan campus
- Komagome Gakuen
- Hakusan Jinja shrine

== See also ==
- List of railway stations in Japan
