= Tōdaimae Station =

Metro station in Tokyo, Japan

Coordinates: 35.717576°N 139.758056°E

Tōdaimae Station 東大前駅

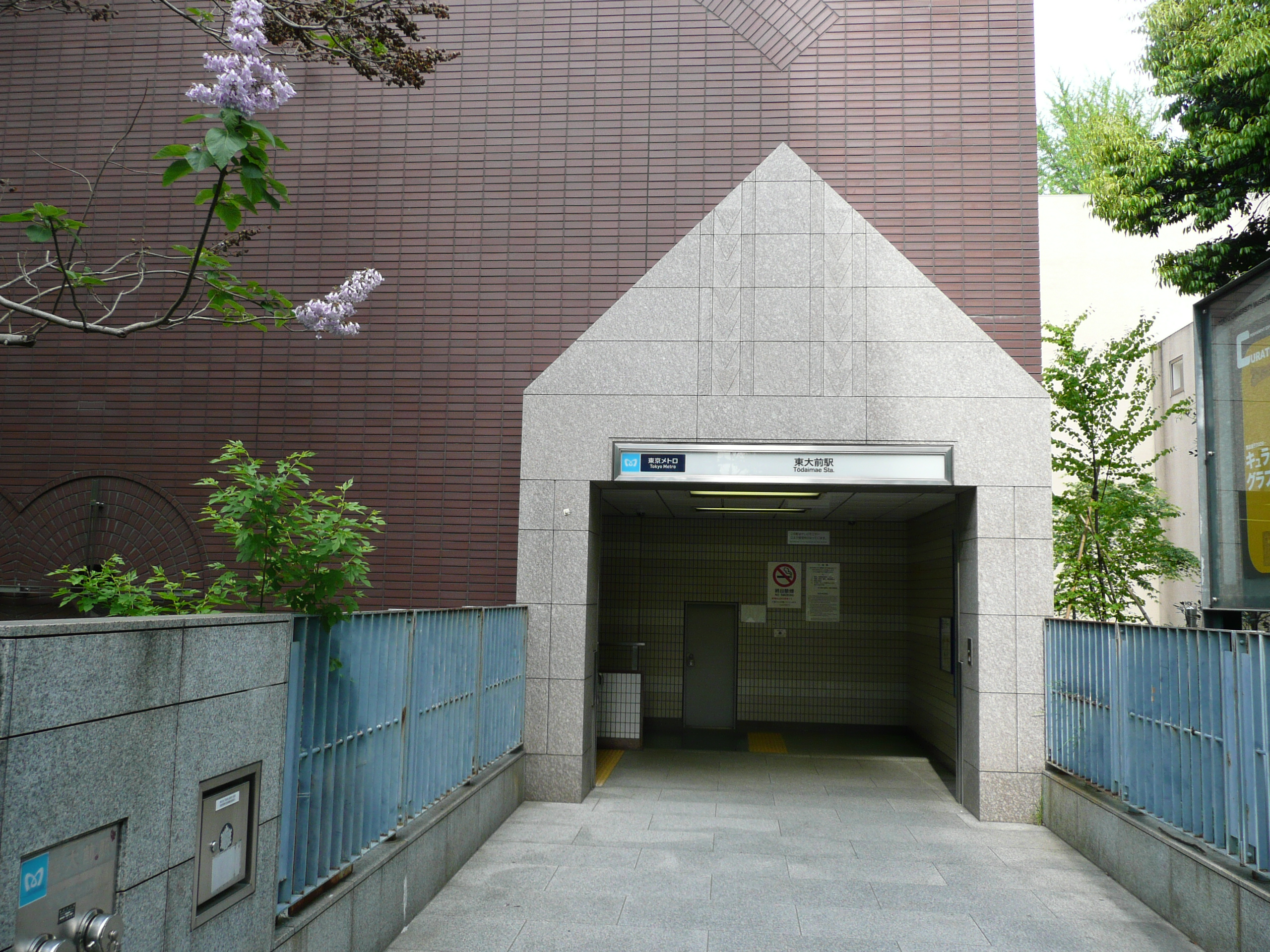
- Exit 1

General information
- Location: 1-19-2 Mukogaoka, Bunkyō, Tokyo; Japan
- Operator: Tokyo Metro
- Line: Namboku Line
- Platforms: 1 island platform
- Tracks: 2

Construction
- Structure type: Underground

Other information
- Station code: N-12

History
- Opened: 26 March 1996; 30 years ago

Services
Preceding station	Tokyo Metro	Following station
Korakuen towards Meguro	Namboku Line	Hon-komagome towards Akabane-iwabuchi
Location
- Location within Tokyo Yamanote Loop Location within Tokyo wards area Location within Japan

Tōdaimae Station (東大前駅, Tōdaimae-eki) is a subway station in the Tokyo Metro network on the Tokyo Metro Namboku Line. It is located in Bunkyo, Tokyo. The station is numbered N-12 and is the nearest station to Yayoi campus of the University of Tokyo.

== Line ==
- Tokyo Metro Namboku Line (station number N-12)

== Station layout ==
The station is composed of a single island platform serving two tracks.

=== Platforms ===
1
Namboku Line
for Komagome and Akabane-iwabuchi
Saitama Rapid Railway Line for Urawa-misono
2
- for Shirokane-takanawa and Meguro
- Meguro Line for Hiyoshi
- Tokyu Shin-Yokohama Line for Shin-Yokohama Station
- Sotetsu Main Line for Ebina via the Tokyu/Sotetsu Shin-Yokohama Line

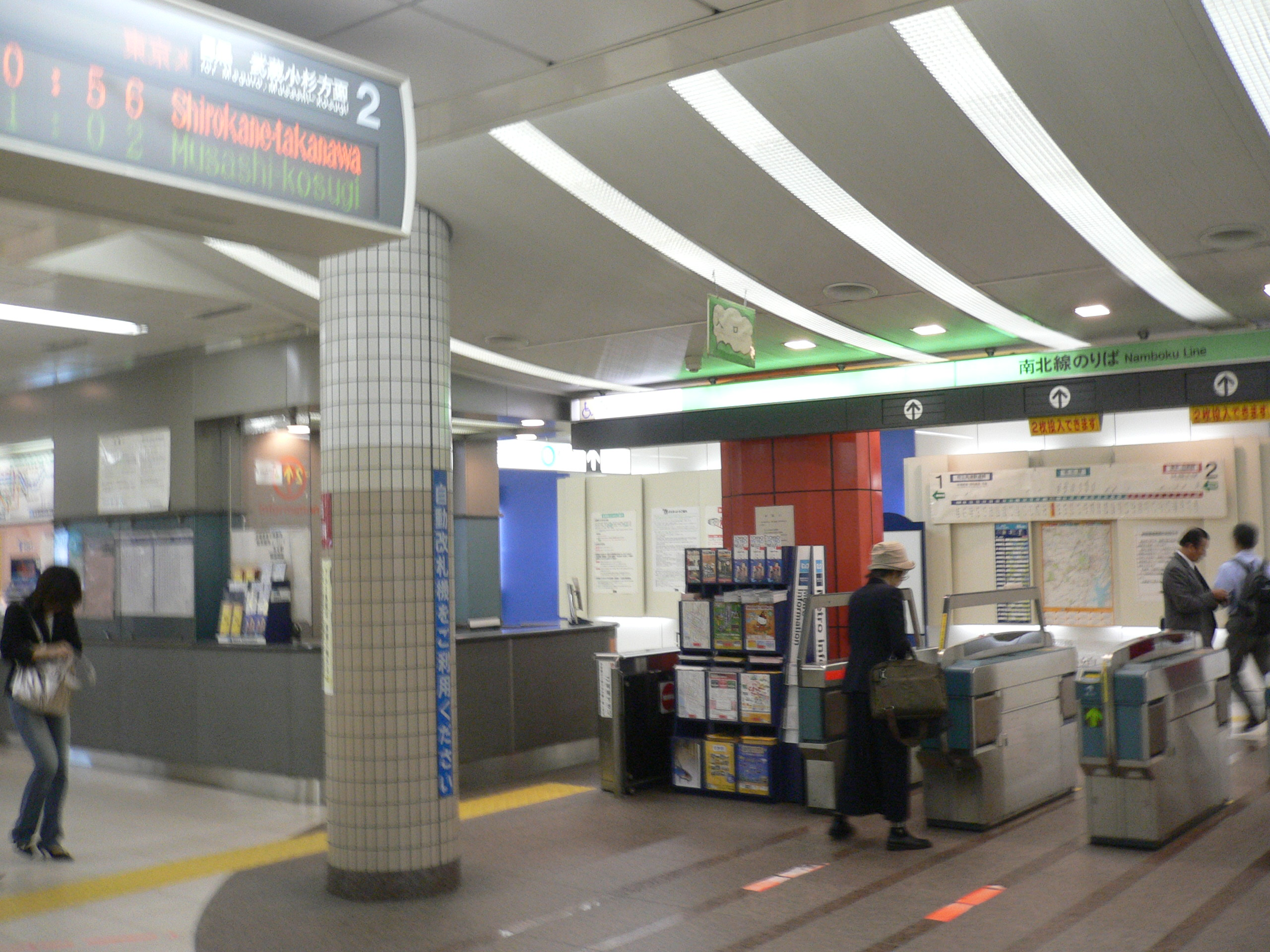
Ticket gate in October 2005

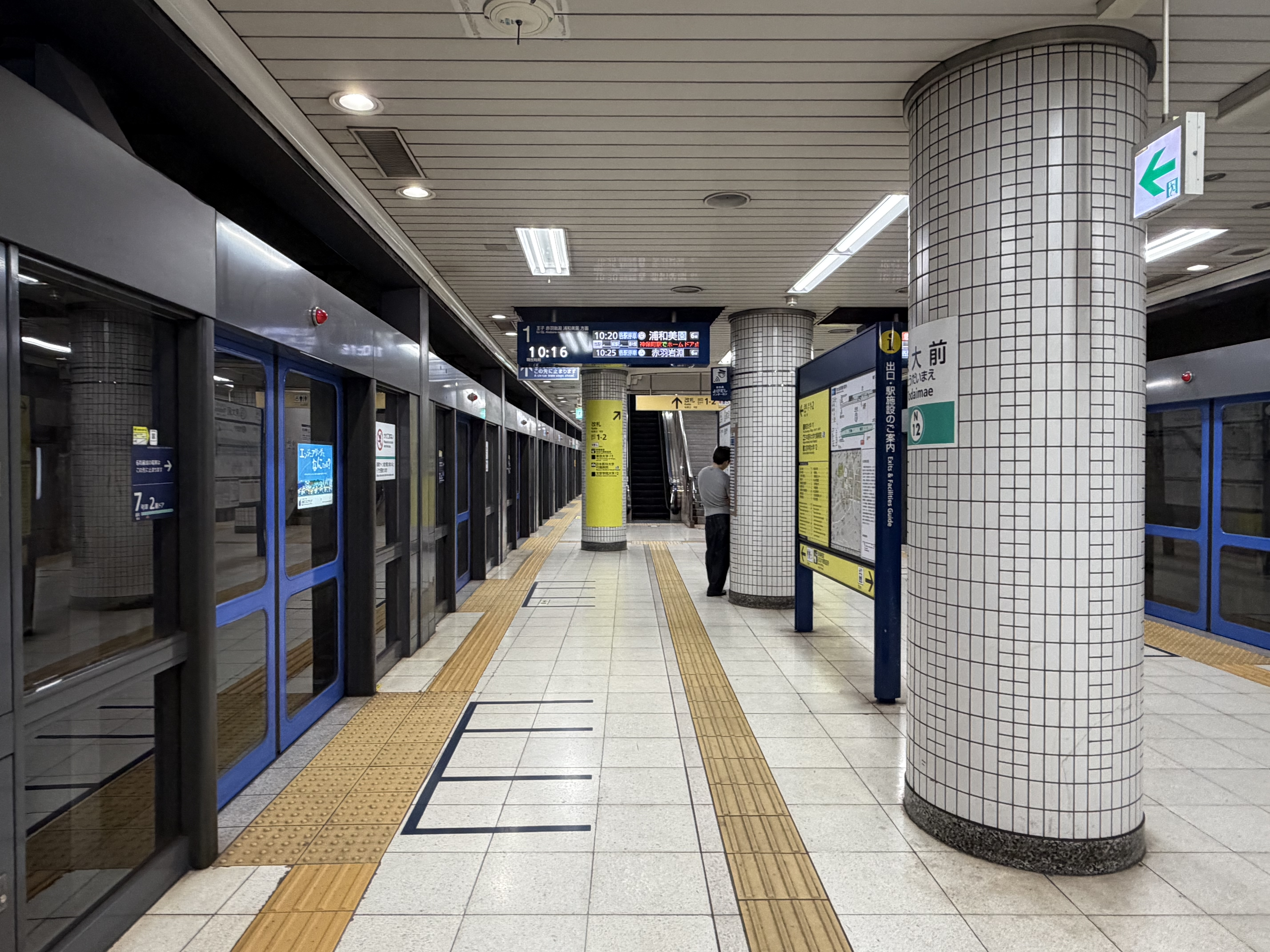
Platform in June 2026

== Surrounding area ==
- University of Tokyo - The first exit of this station is in the Yayoi campus of the university
- Bunkyo Gakuin University
- Nippon Medical School's Sendagi campus
- Saikyoji Temple
- Nezu Shrine

== History ==
Tōdaimae Station opened on March 26, 1996.

The station facilities were inherited by Tokyo Metro after the privatization of the Teito Rapid Transit Authority (TRTA) in 2004.

On May 7, 2025, two people were injured in a knife attack at a station platform. The assailant was arrested.
