= Nezu Shrine =

Shinto shrine in Tokyo, Japan

Nezu Shrine 根津神社
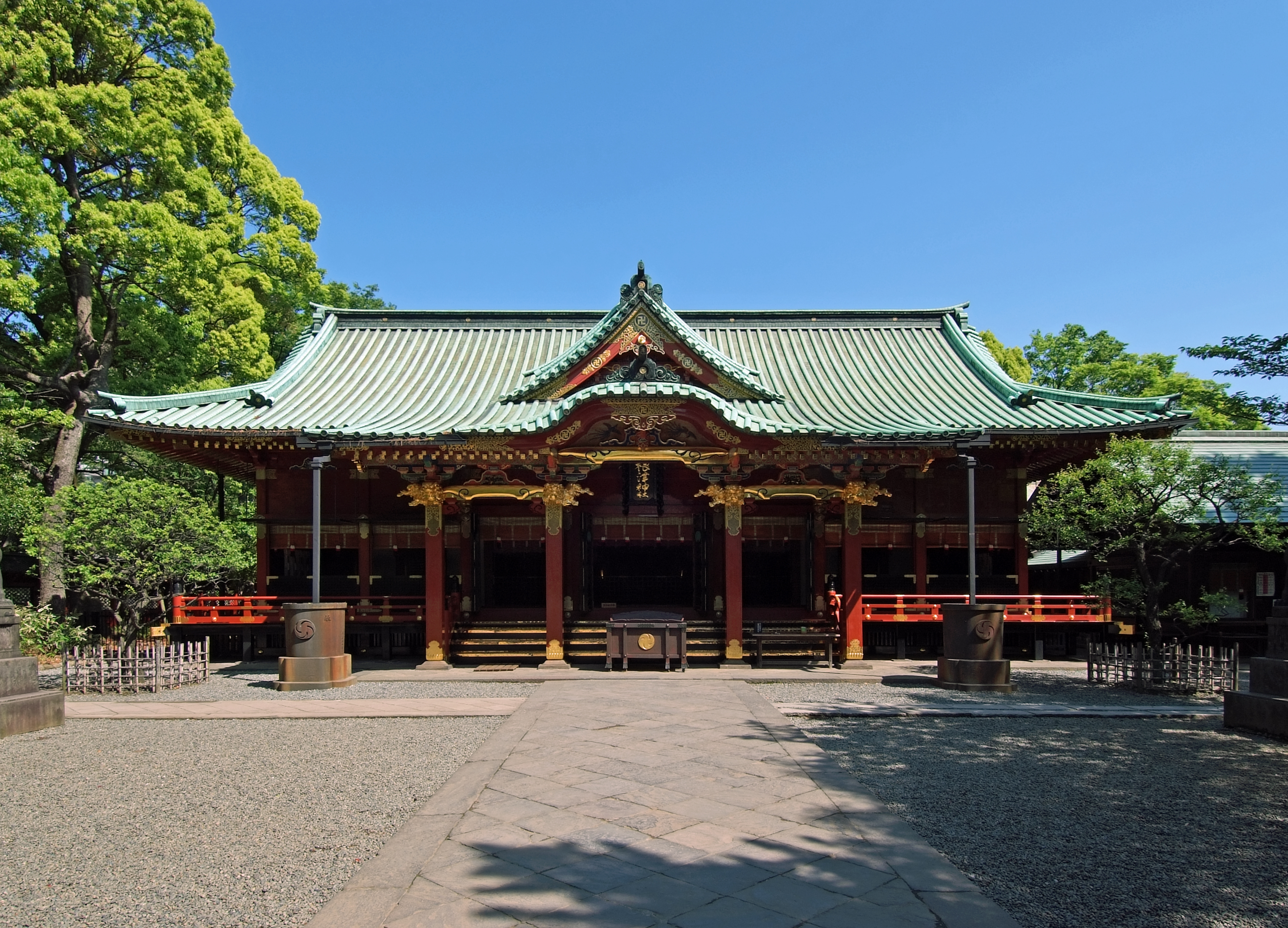
- The Nezu Shrine honden

- Location within Japan

Religion
- Affiliation: Shinto
- Deity: Susanoo-no-Mikoto

Location
- Location: 1 Chome-28-9 Nezu, Bunkyō, Tokyo 〒 113-0031
- Interactive map of Nezu Shrine 根津神社
- Coordinates: 35°43′13″N 139°45′39″E

Architecture
- Style: Ishi-no-ma-zukuri
- Founder: Yamato Takeru
- Established: 1705

Website
- www.nedujinja.or.jp

Nezu Shrine (根津神社, Nezu-jinja) is a Shinto shrine located in the Bunkyō ward of Tokyo, Japan.

Established in 1705, it is one of the oldest places of worship in the city, and several of the buildings on the shrine grounds have been designated as Important Cultural Property. It was built in the Ishi-no-ma-zukuri style of Shinto architecture, following the Tōshō-gū shrine in Nikkō.

It is famous for its Azalea Festival (Tsutsuji Matsuri) which is held on its grounds from early April until early May, and it has been described as "Tokyo’s most beautiful shrine" and as one of the city's "most spectacular spring scenes".

It is one of the Tokyo Ten Shrines (東京十社, Tokyo Jissha).

== History ==
According to the legend, the Nezu shrine was founded in Sendagi, just north of the current location, in the 1st century by Yamato Takeru (also known as Prince Ōsu), the son of Emperor Keikō. The chief deity of the shrine was Susanoo-no-Mikoto, the kami of the sea and storms.

In 1705 the shrine was relocated to Nezu by Tokugawa Tsunayoshi (1646–1709), the fifth shōgun of the Tokugawa dynasty, on the occasion of him choosing his successor, Tokugawa Ienobu (1662–1712). In turn, Ienobu chose it as the guardian deity. Nothing is left from the structures prior to the relocation, but it still is one of the oldest shrines in the city.

When Emperor Meiji moved his residence from the Kyoto Imperial Palace to the Imperial Palace in Tokyo in 1868-1869, he sent envoys to the shrine to have it intercede with the gods on his behalf.

== Architecture ==
=== Torii ===
There is a multitude of torii (鳥居; literally bird abode) surrounding Nezu Shrine. The two main entrances are marked by big red torii in the myōjin style, very common in Shinto architecture, characterized by curved upper lintels. A plaque on top of them reads 根津神社, the name of the shrine. They are flanked by lanterns.

One of the most famous features of the shrine is the path of vermilion torii through the hillside left of the main hall. In the middle of the path there is a viewing platform over a pond of koi, overlooking the main shrine precincts. The subsidiary Otome Inari Shrine is located here.

Another shorter path of torii leads down some stairs from the subsidiary Komagome Shrine to the larger path of torii.

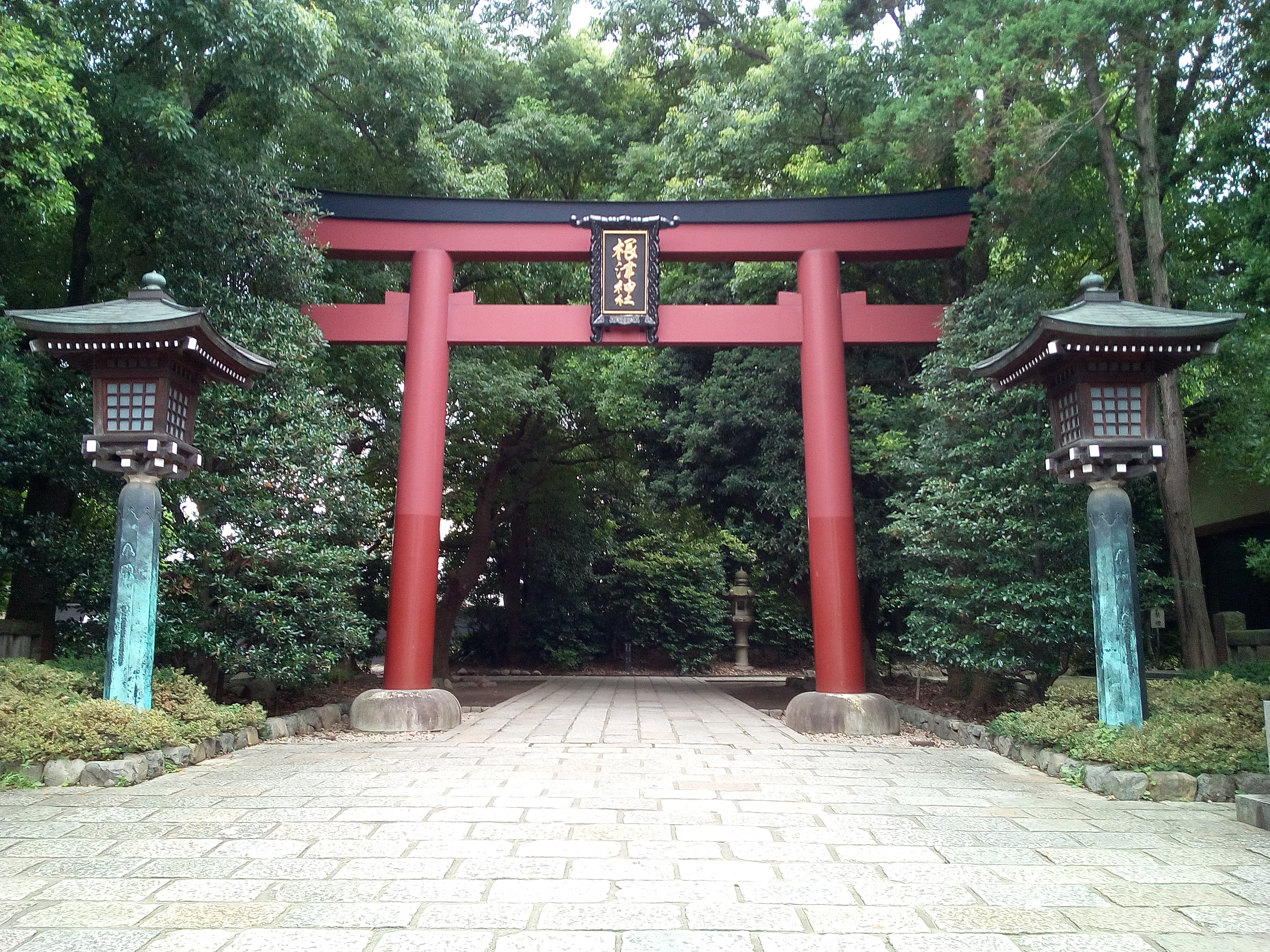
red myōjin torii at one of the entrances

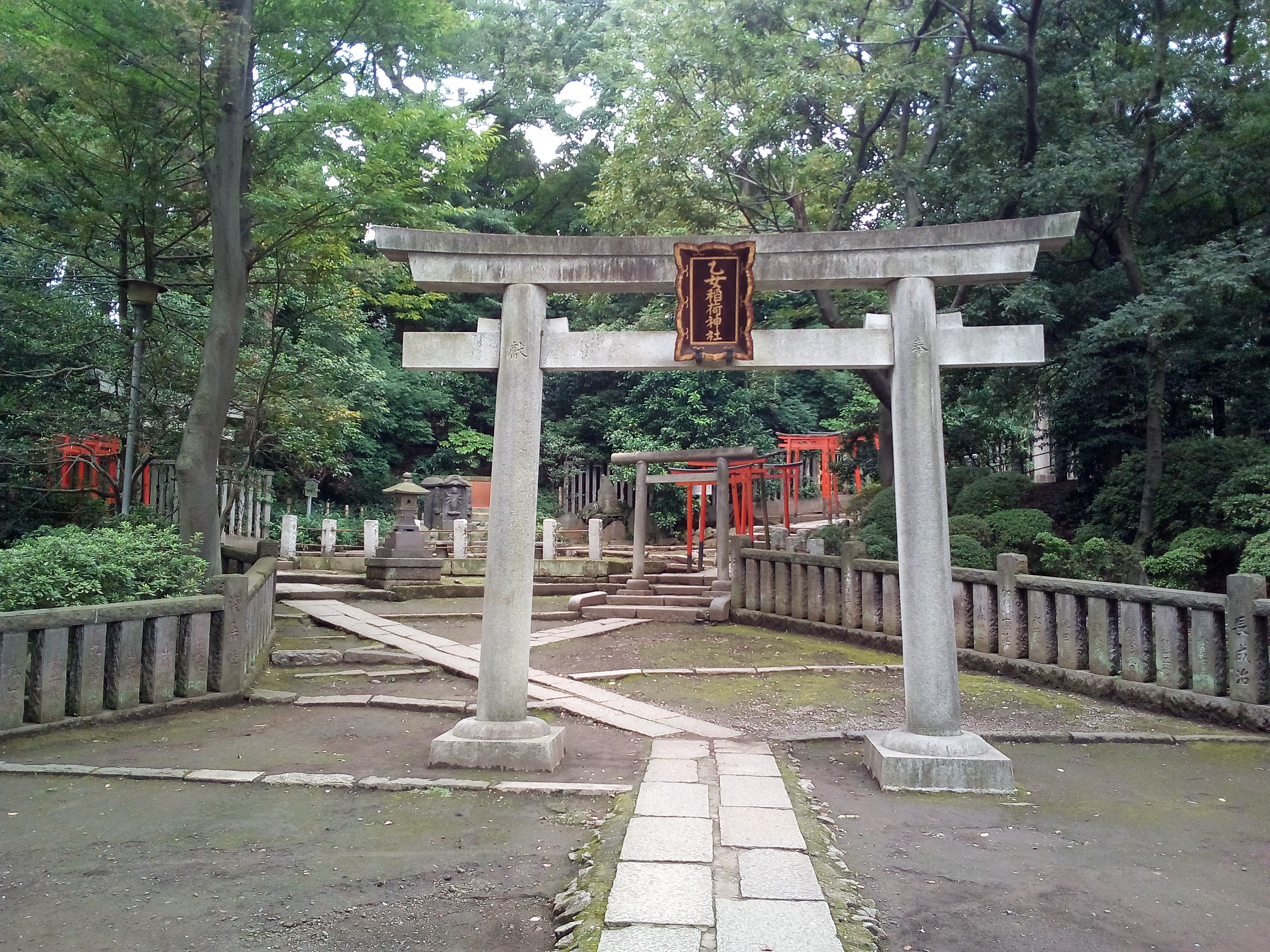
a stone myōjin torii

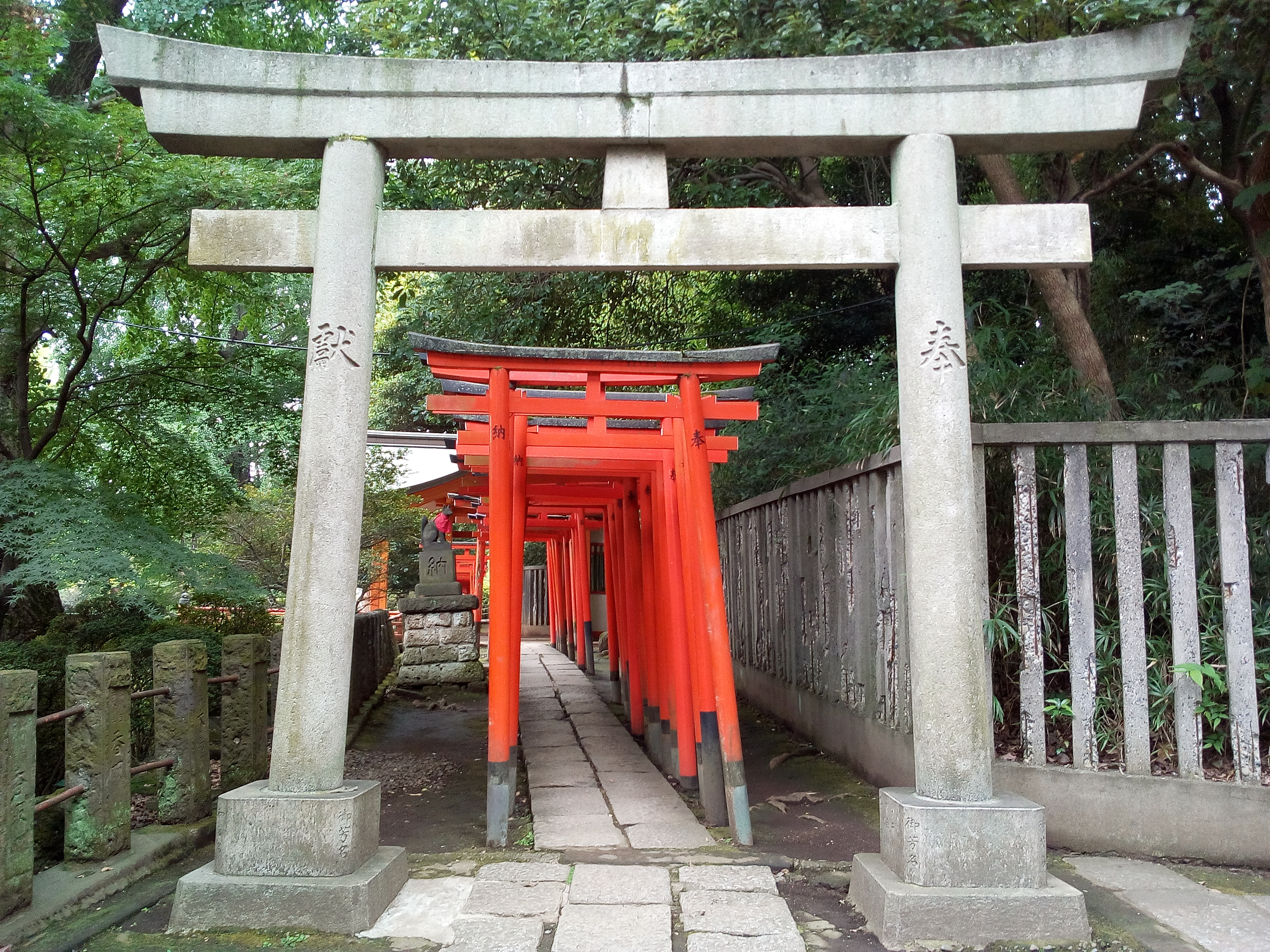
entrance to the path of torii

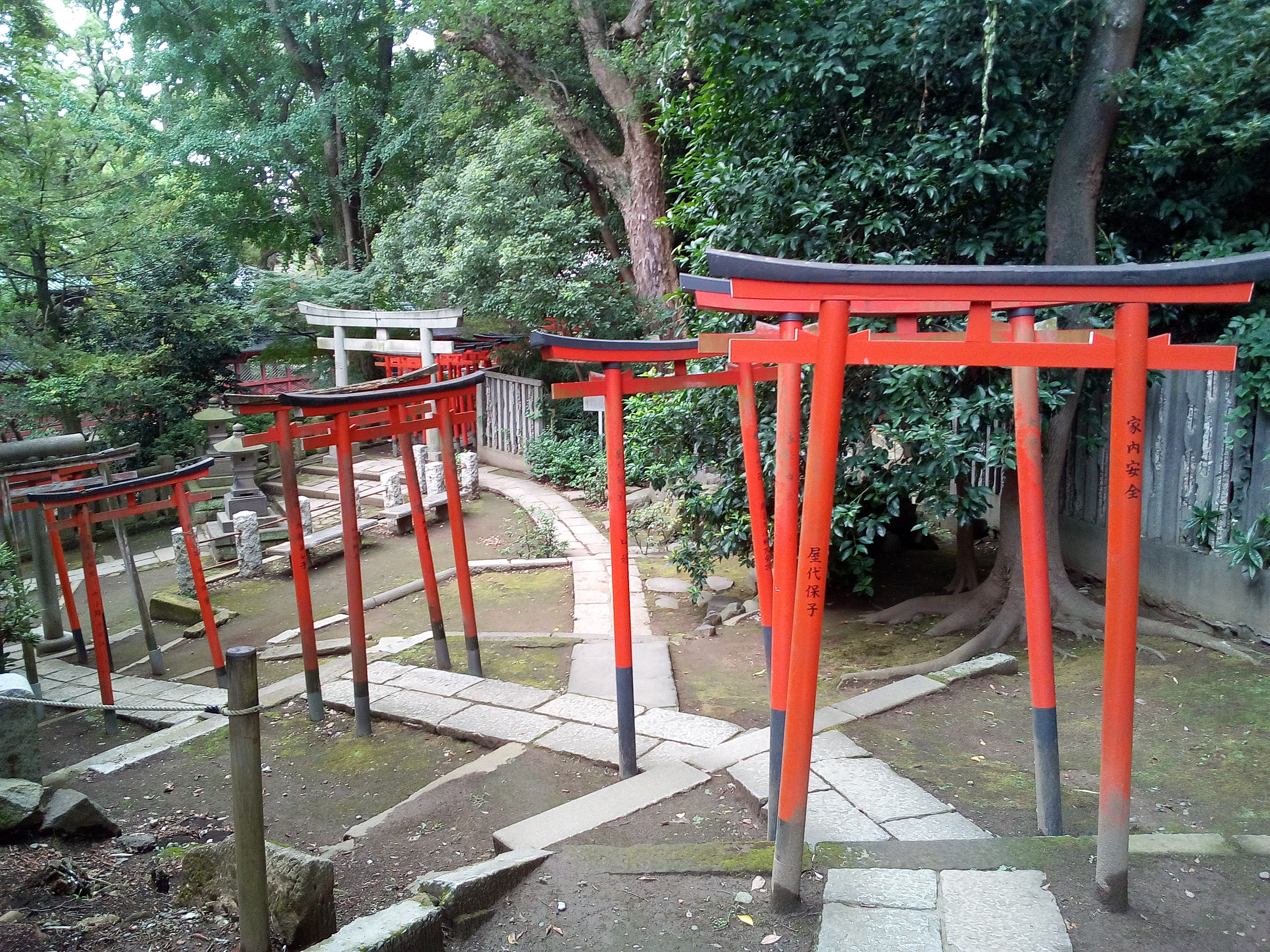
a shorter torii path

=== Rōmon ===
A two-storied rōmon (楼門; tower gate) is a type of mon characterized by an inaccessible upper floor. Originally an element of Buddhist architecture, this type of mon is also commonly found in Shinto shrines. The one at Nezu shrine is located between the honden and a little bridge, which makes it a popular attraction of the shrine.

A plaque on top of the gate reads Nezu-jinja (根津神社). It is guarded by two zuishin, statues of kami warrior-guardians depicted holding bows and arrows.

It was built in 1706, and it is designated an Important Cultural Property.

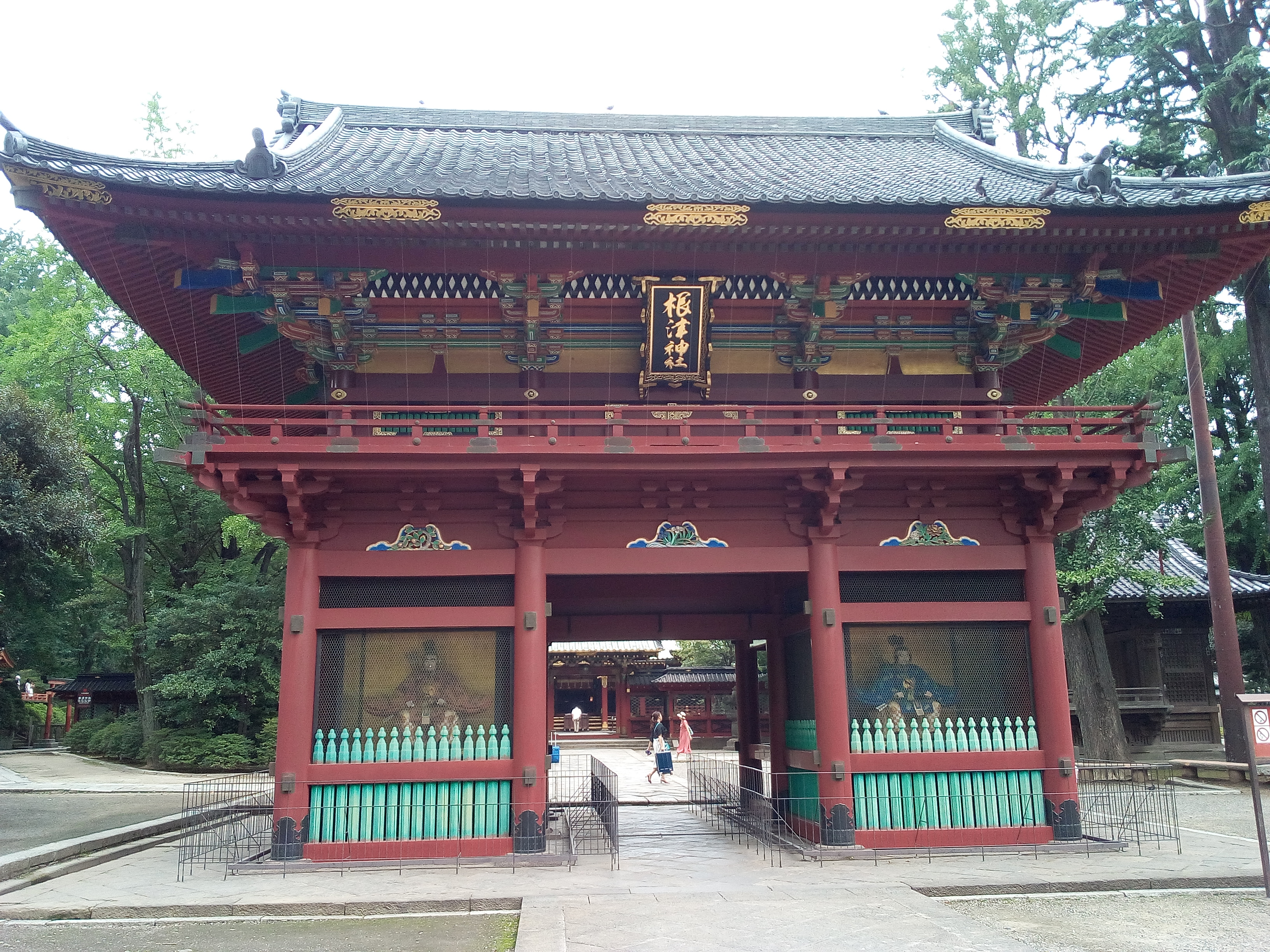
front view of the rōmon

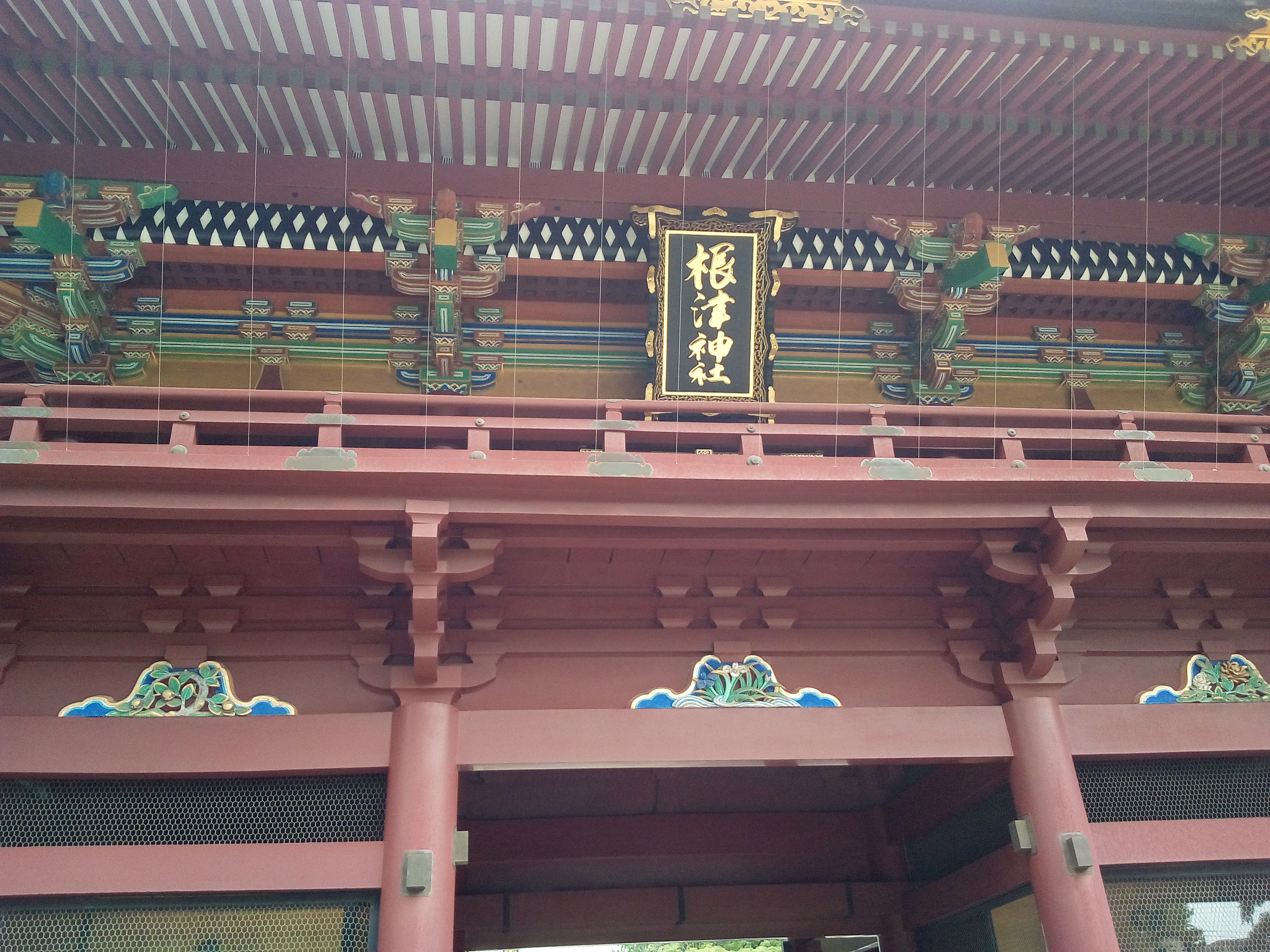
plaque with the name of the shrine

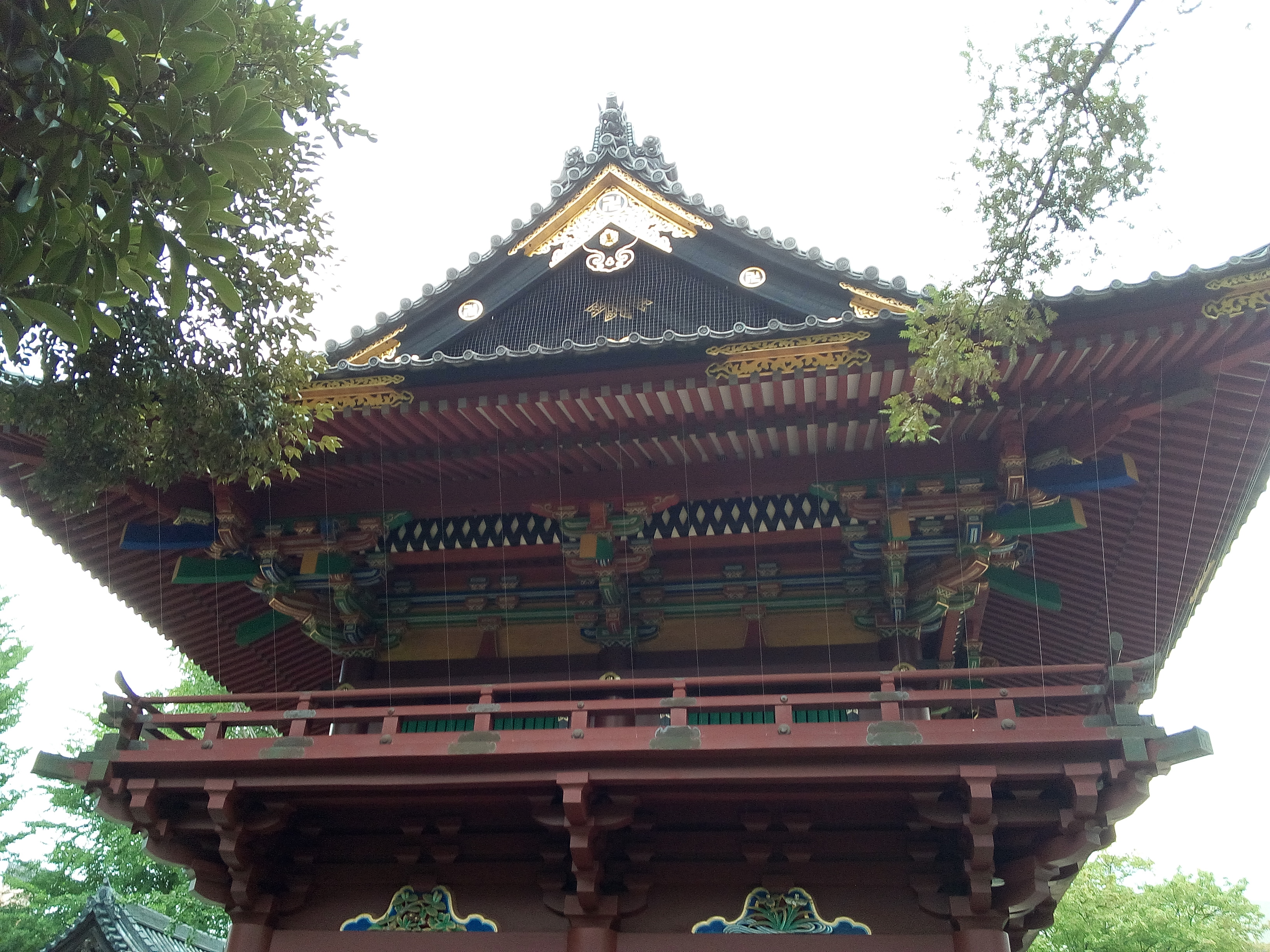
detail of one side of the rōmon

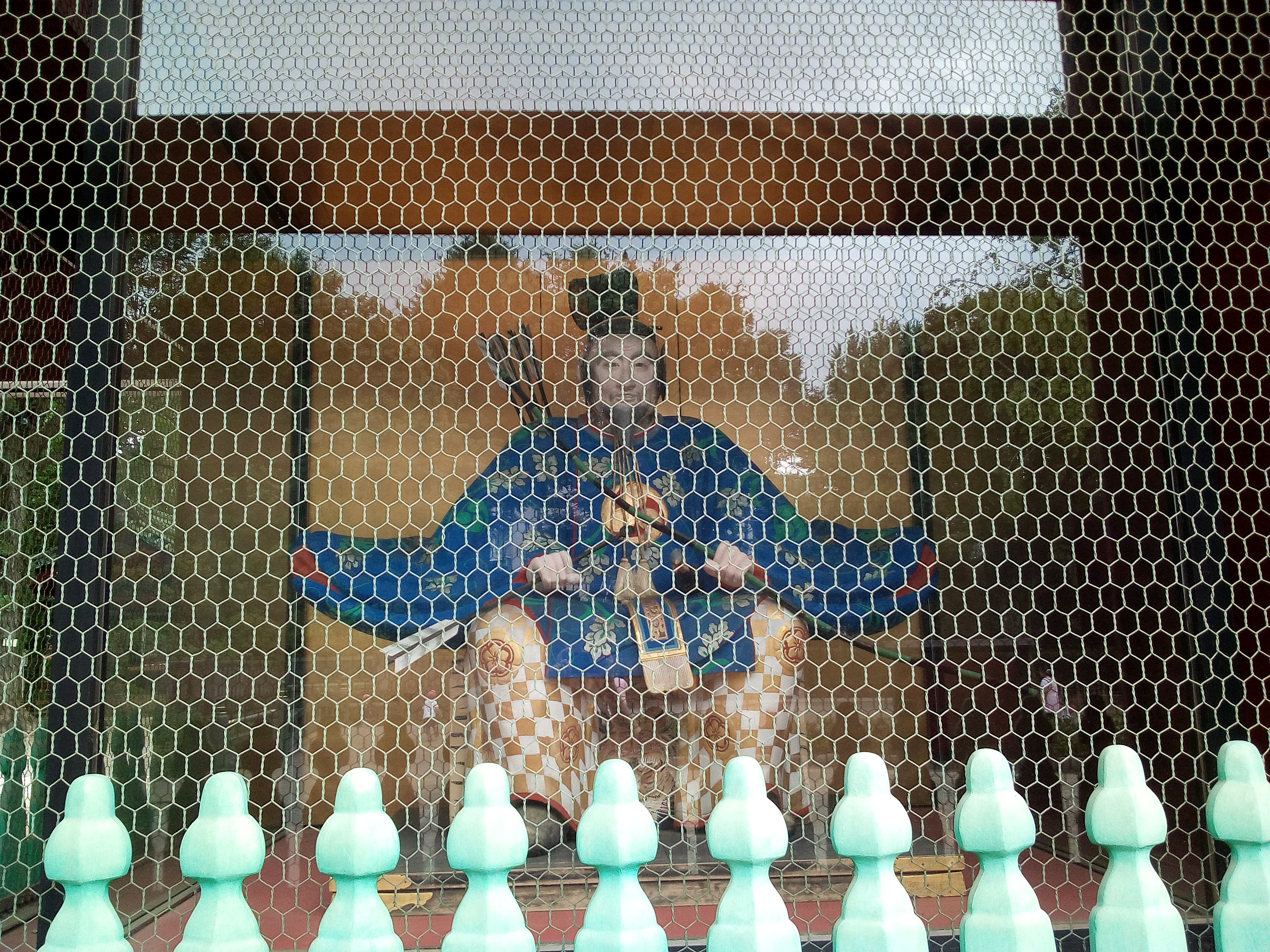
one of the two zuishin statue

=== Honden ===
The main building of Nezu shrine is a honden (本殿, main hall) in the Ishi-no-ma-zukuri style, a complex Shinto shrine structure in which the haiden, or worship hall, the heiden, or offertory hall, and the honden, are all interconnected under the same roof.

The whole structure dates from 1706.

All three parts of the building (honden, haiden and heiden) are separately designated as an Important Cultural Property.

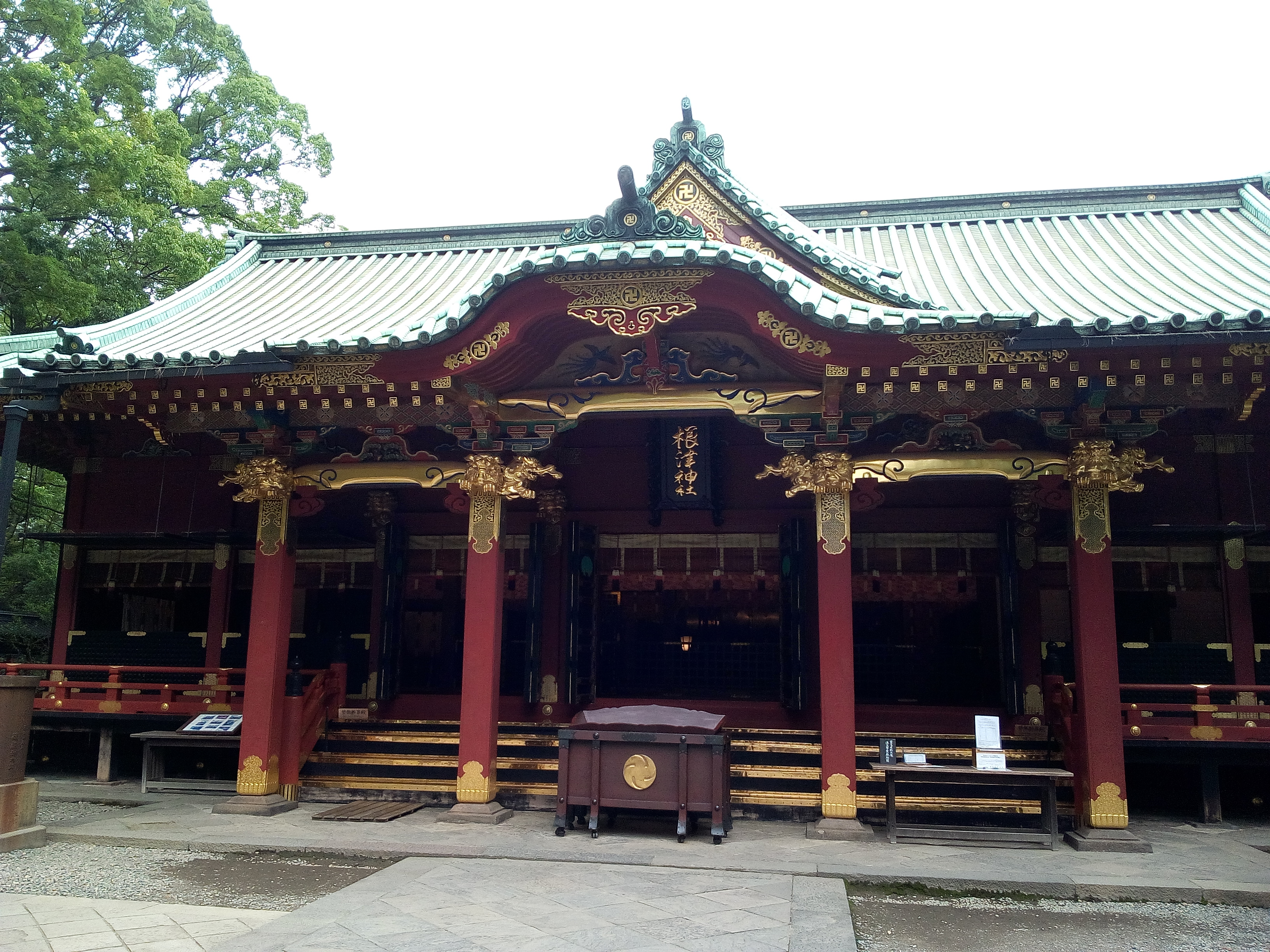
front view of the honden

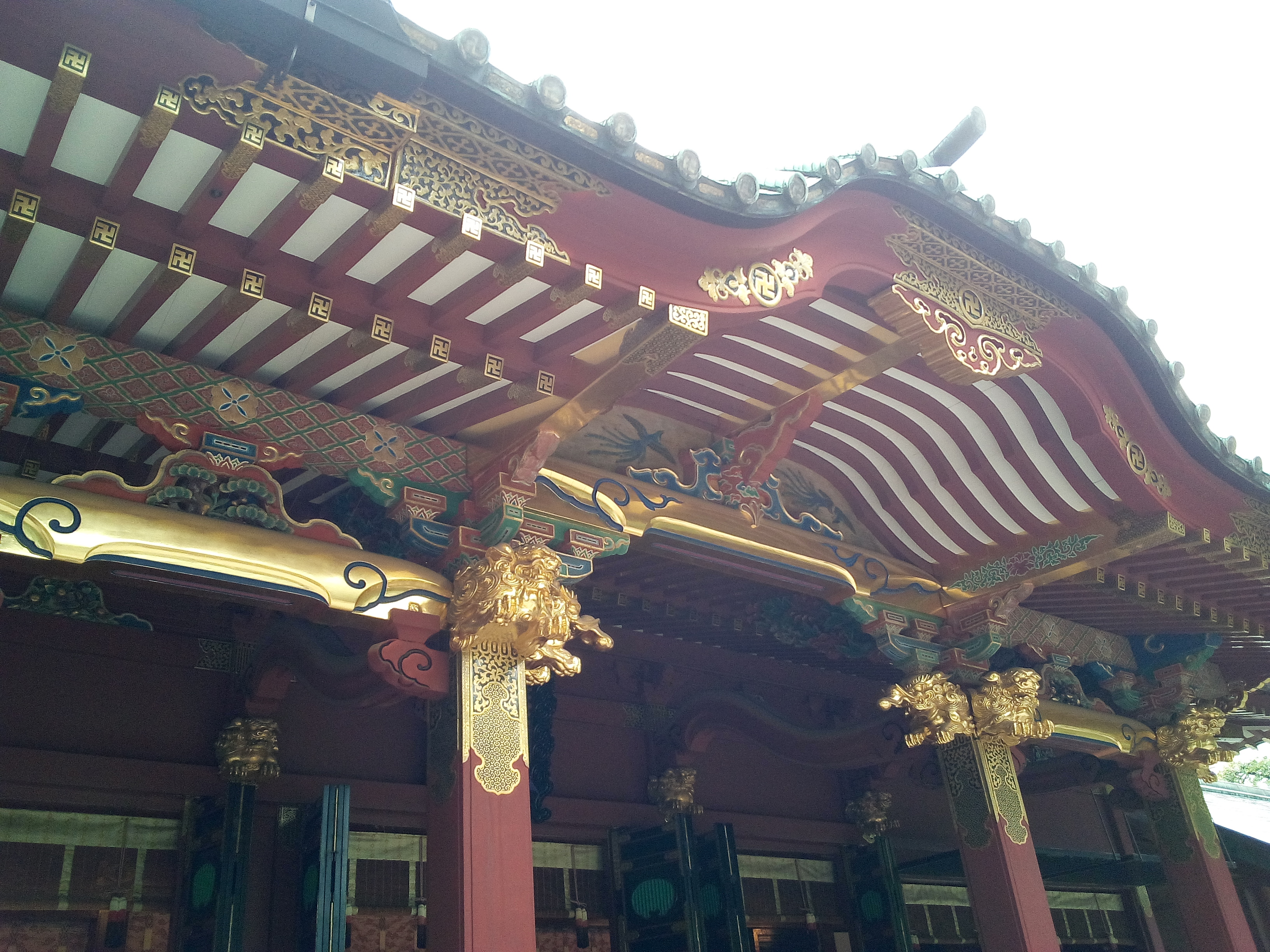
detail of the honden

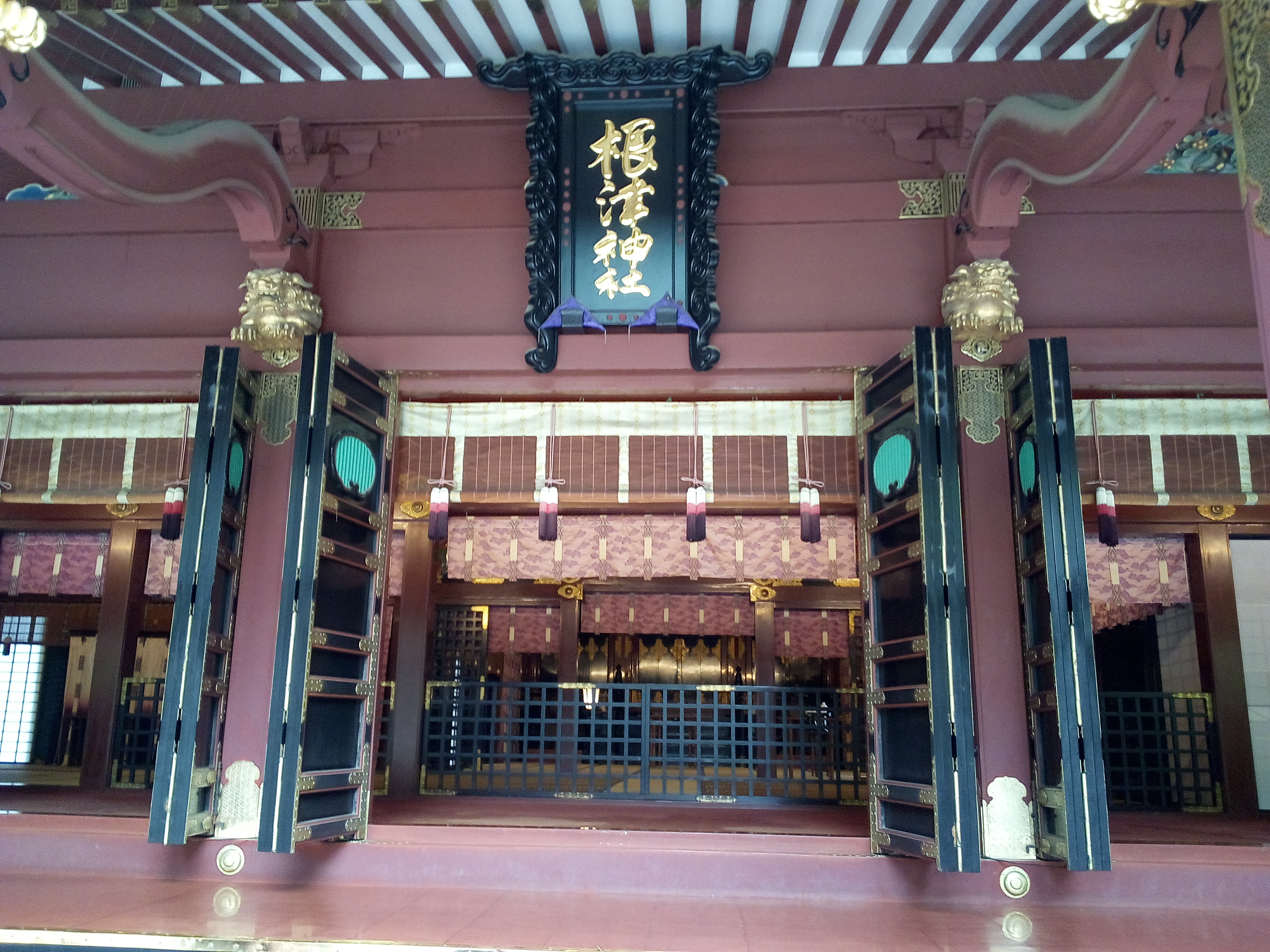
interior of the honden and haiden

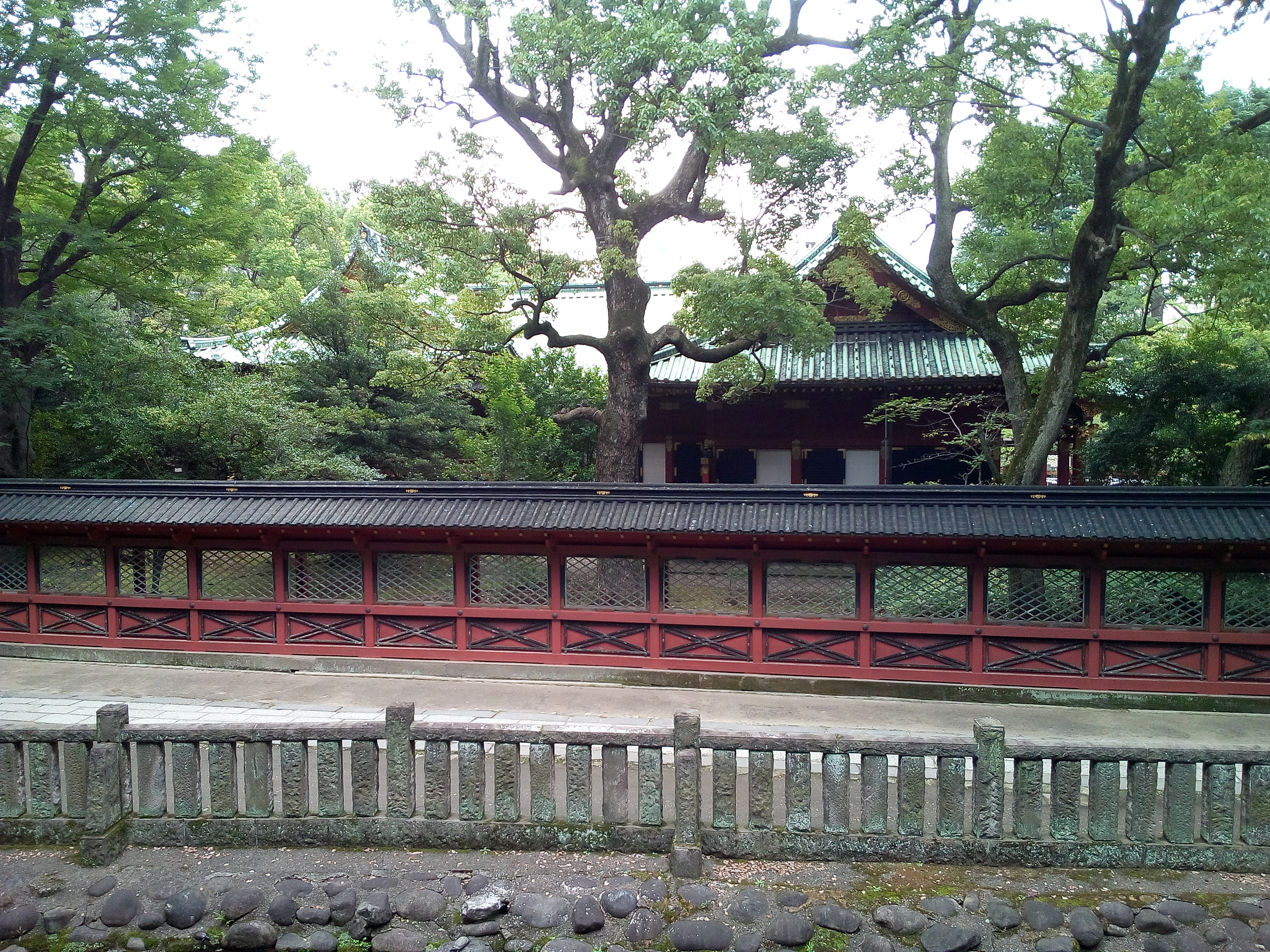
the honden seen from the viewing platform

=== Karamon and Sukibei walls ===
A karamon (唐門, "chinese gate") is a type of mon found in Japanese castles, Buddhist temples and Shinto shrines. Connected to it in this case there is a Sukibei ("lattice-windowed wall"), a 200 meter wall surrounding the honden.

A similar combination of karamon and Sukibei can be seen at the Ueno Tōshō-gū, another Edo period Shinto shrine in Tokyo closely associated to the Tokugawa shogunate.

Both structures were built in 1706, and both of them are designated as Important Cultural Properties.

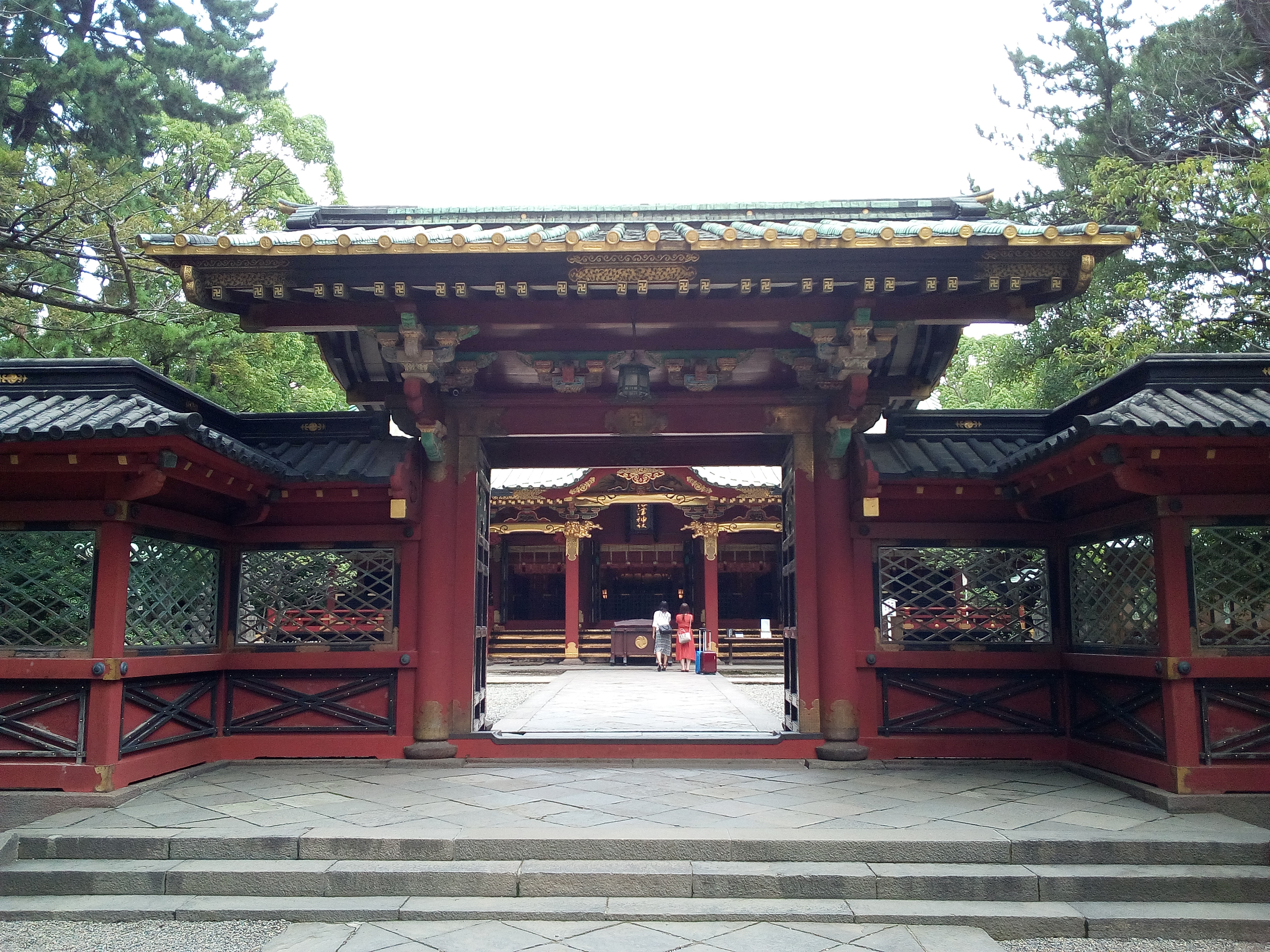
front view of the karamon

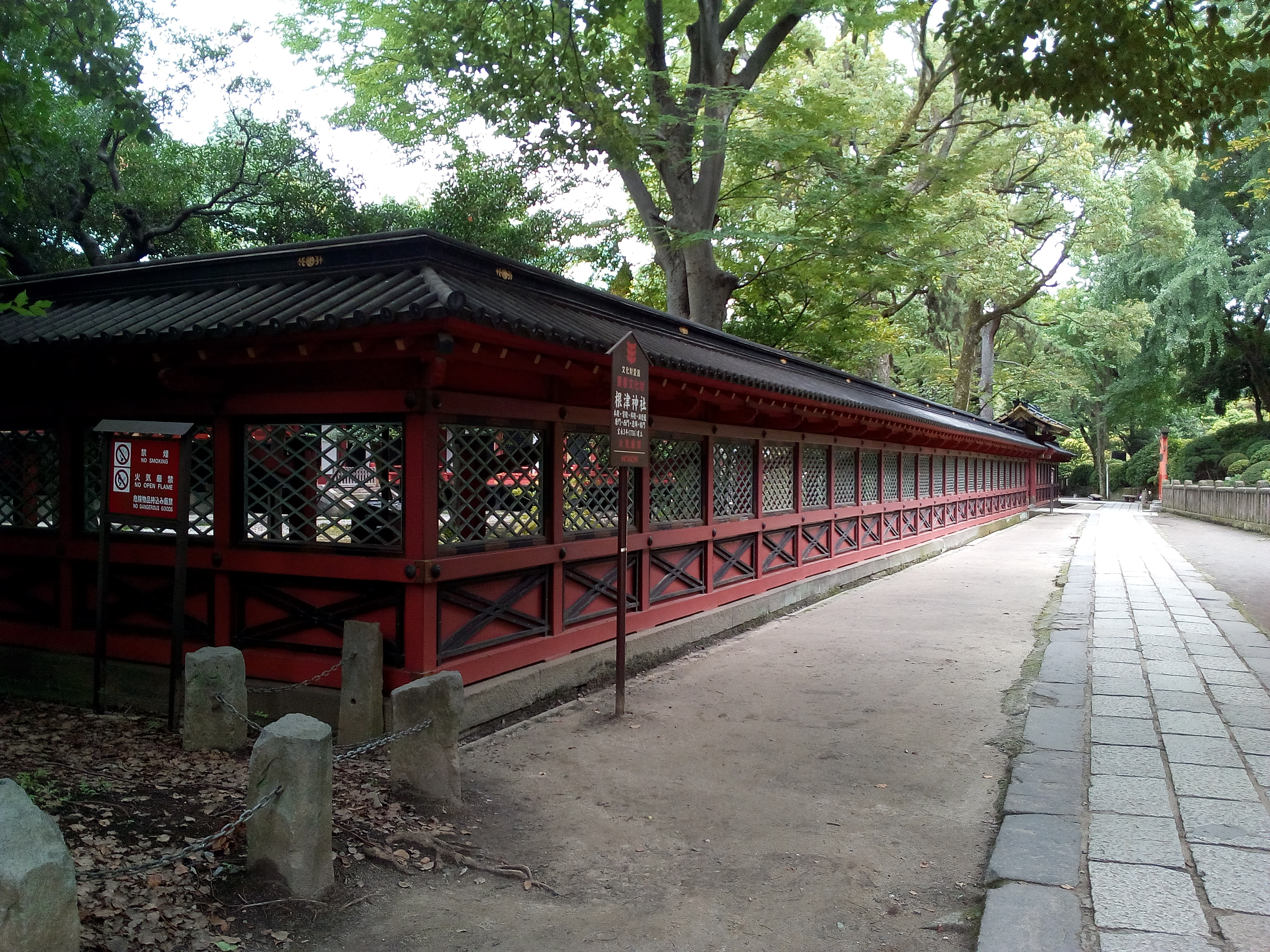
the Sukibei senn from the outside

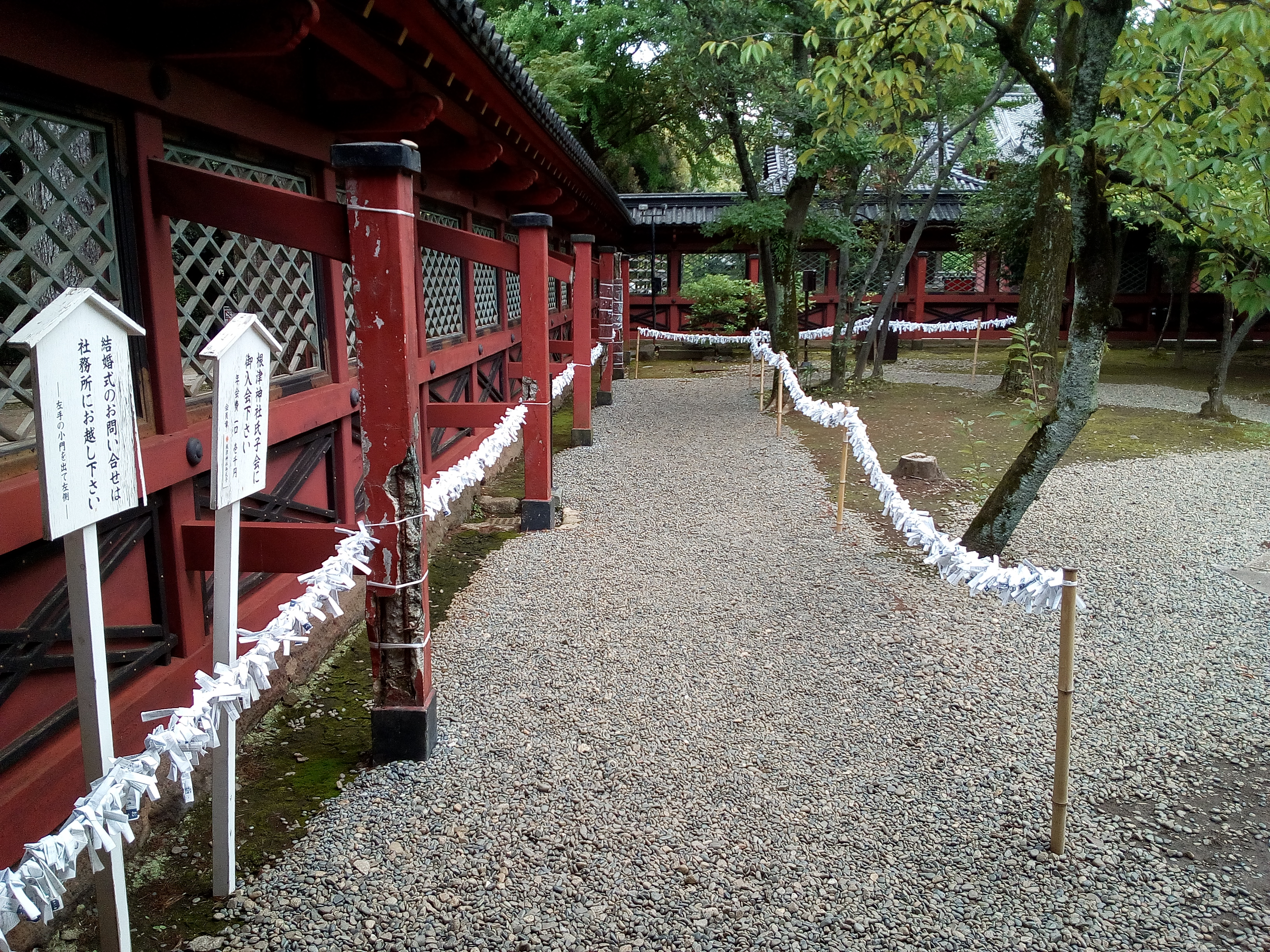
the Sukibei senn from the inside

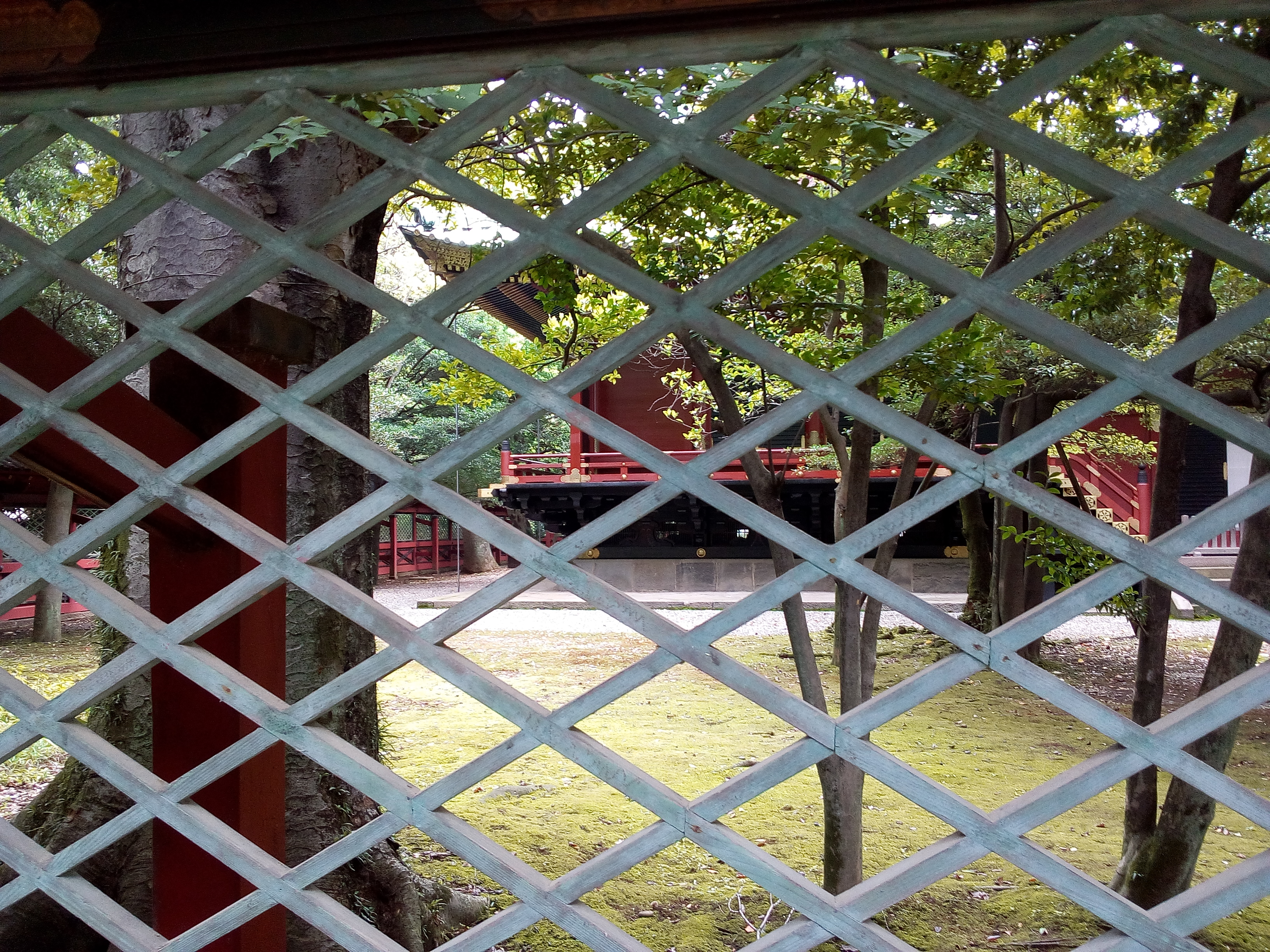
honden seen through the Sukibei

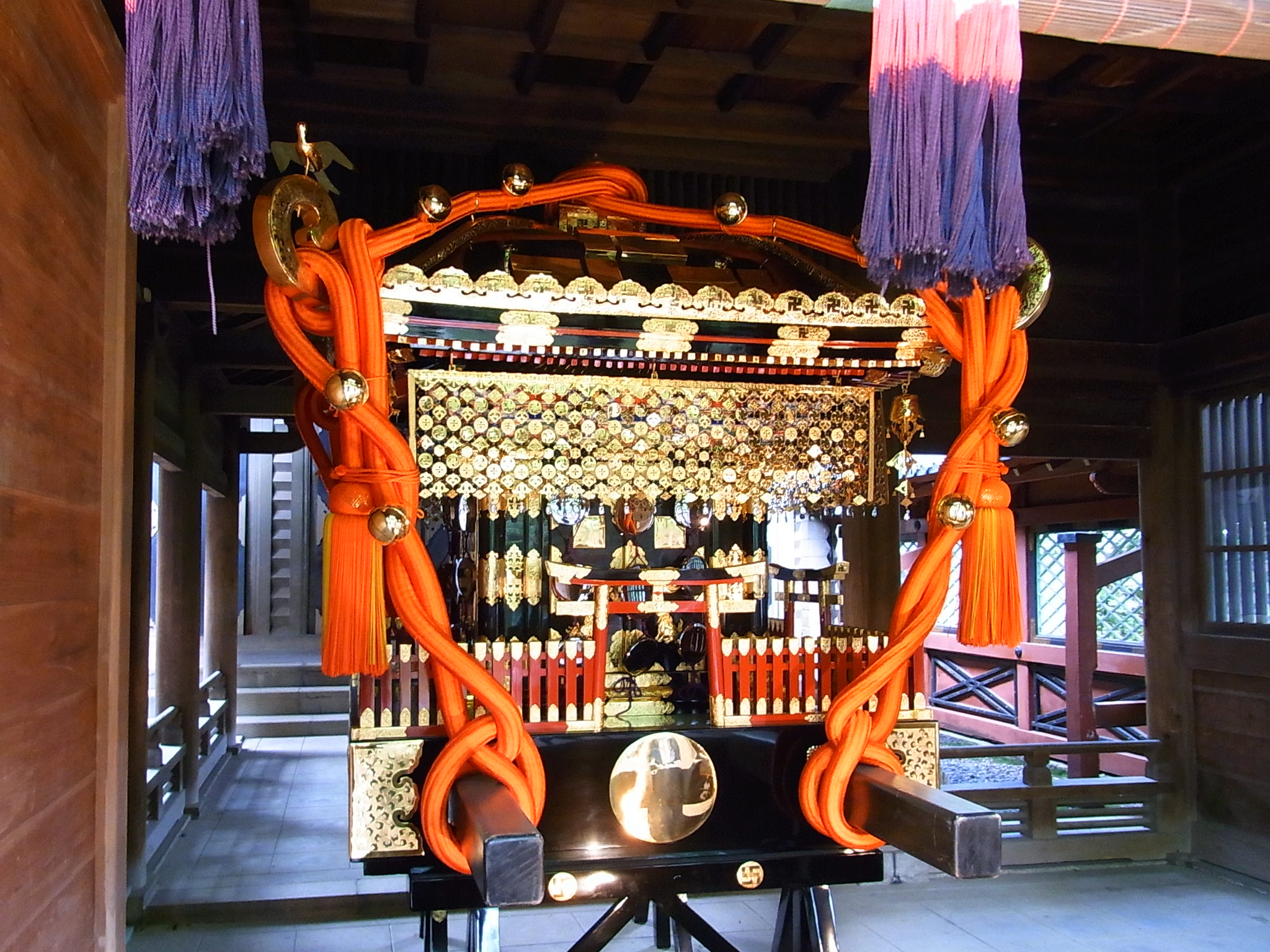
Mikoshi

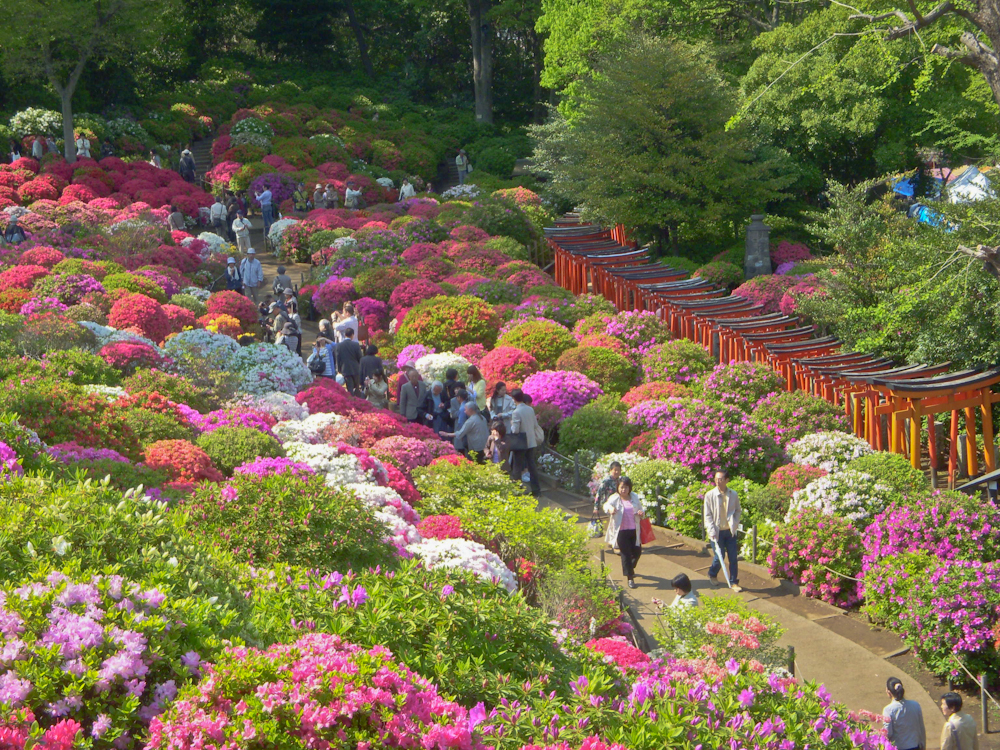
Rhododendron

== Access ==
There is no admission fee for visitors to enter the shrine precincts.

The entrances are at a 5 minute walk from Nezu Station on the Chiyoda Line (9 minute from Sendagi Station in the same line) and at a 6 minute walk from Todaimae Station on the Namboku Line.
