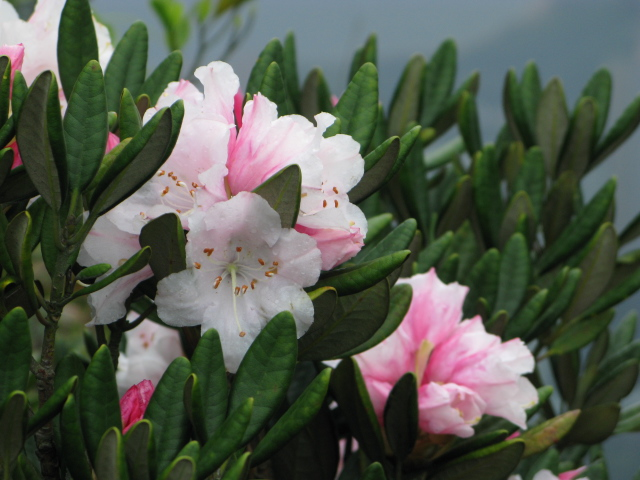

Scientific classification
- Kingdom: Plantae
- Clade: Tracheophytes
- Clade: Angiosperms
- Clade: Eudicots
- Clade: Asterids
- Order: Ericales
- Family: Ericaceae
- Genus: Rhododendron
- Species: R. simiarum

Binomial name
- Rhododendron simiarum Hance

= Rhododendron simiarum =

South China rhododendron

Species of plant

Rhododendron simiarum, the South China rhododendron, is one of the many species of the genus Rhododendron, which mainly grows in Southern China. The species has also developed a habitat in Hong Kong, being one of the six native species of rhododendrons grown in Hong Kong, commonly found in the slopes of Ma On Shan, and Lantau Island. It is also distributed in Hainan, Guangdong, Guangxi, Hunan, Jiangxi, Fujian, Zhejiang.

== Description ==
It grows as a bushy shrub or small tree, typically 1–2 m (3.3–6.6 ft), but can be as tall as 3 m (9.8 ft). The bark is grey in color, exfoliating into thin, small, irregular flakes. The young shoots are densely covered with tomentose grey hairs, later becoming hairless. The branchlets are grey tomentose when young, with those more than one year old glabrescent. The flowers bloom from April to early May, having up to 4 to 6 clustered flowers at the top of branches, each funnel-shaped, pink with red spots at first, but turning lighter when fully opened, ranging from white to dark pink.
