= Kawarayu-Onsen Station =

Railway station in Naganohara, Gunma Prefecture, Japan

Kawarayu-Onsen Station 川原湯温泉駅
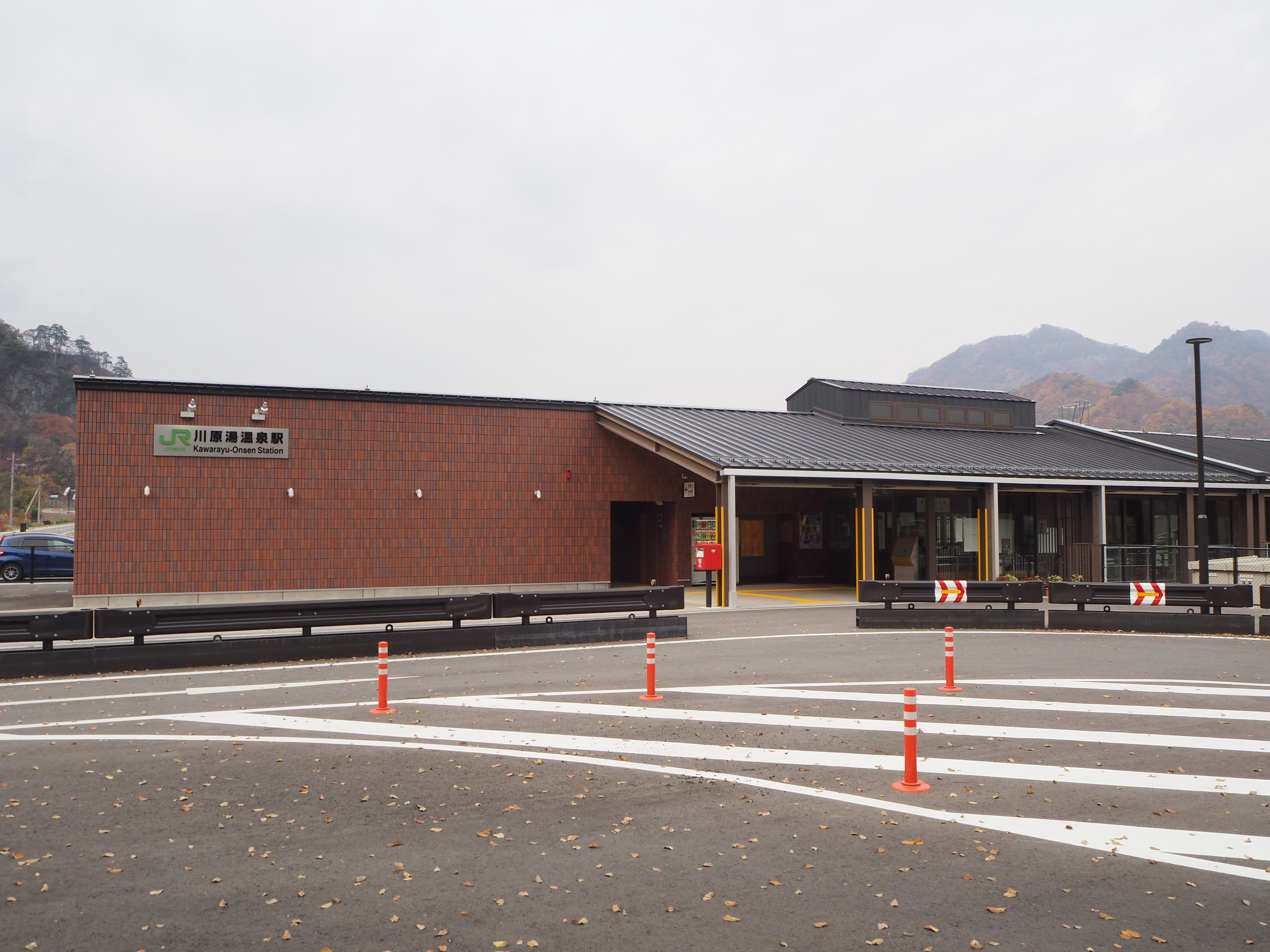
- Kawarayu-Onsen Station in November 2015

General information
- Location: Kawarayu, Naganohara-machi, Agatsuma-gun, Gunma-ken 377-1302; Japan
- Coordinates: 36.5535°N 138.7079°E
- Operator: JR East
- Line: ■ Agatsuma Line
- Distance: 42.0 km from Shibukawa
- Platforms: 1 island platform
- Tracks: 2

Other information
- Status: Staffed
- Website: Official website

History
- Opened: 20 April 1946
- Former names: Kawarayu (to 1987)

Passengers
- FY2019: 18

Services
Preceding station	JR East	Following station
Naganohara-Kusatsuguchi towards Ōmae	Agatsuma Line	Iwashima towards Takasaki
Location
- Location within Gunma Prefecture Location within Japan

Kawarayu-Onsen Station (川原湯温泉駅, Kawarayu-Onsen-eki) is a passenger railway station in the town of Naganohara, Gunma, Japan, operated by East Japan Railway Company (JR East).

== Lines ==
Kawarayu-Onsen Station is served by the Agatsuma Line, and is located 42.0 kilometers from the starting point of the line at Shibukawa Station.

== Station layout ==
The station consists of a single island platform connected to the station building by a footbridge. It is staffed.

=== Platforms ===
1	■ Agatsuma Line	for Manza-Kazawaguchi and Ōmae
2	■ Agatsuma Line	for Nakanojō, Shibukawa, and Takasaki

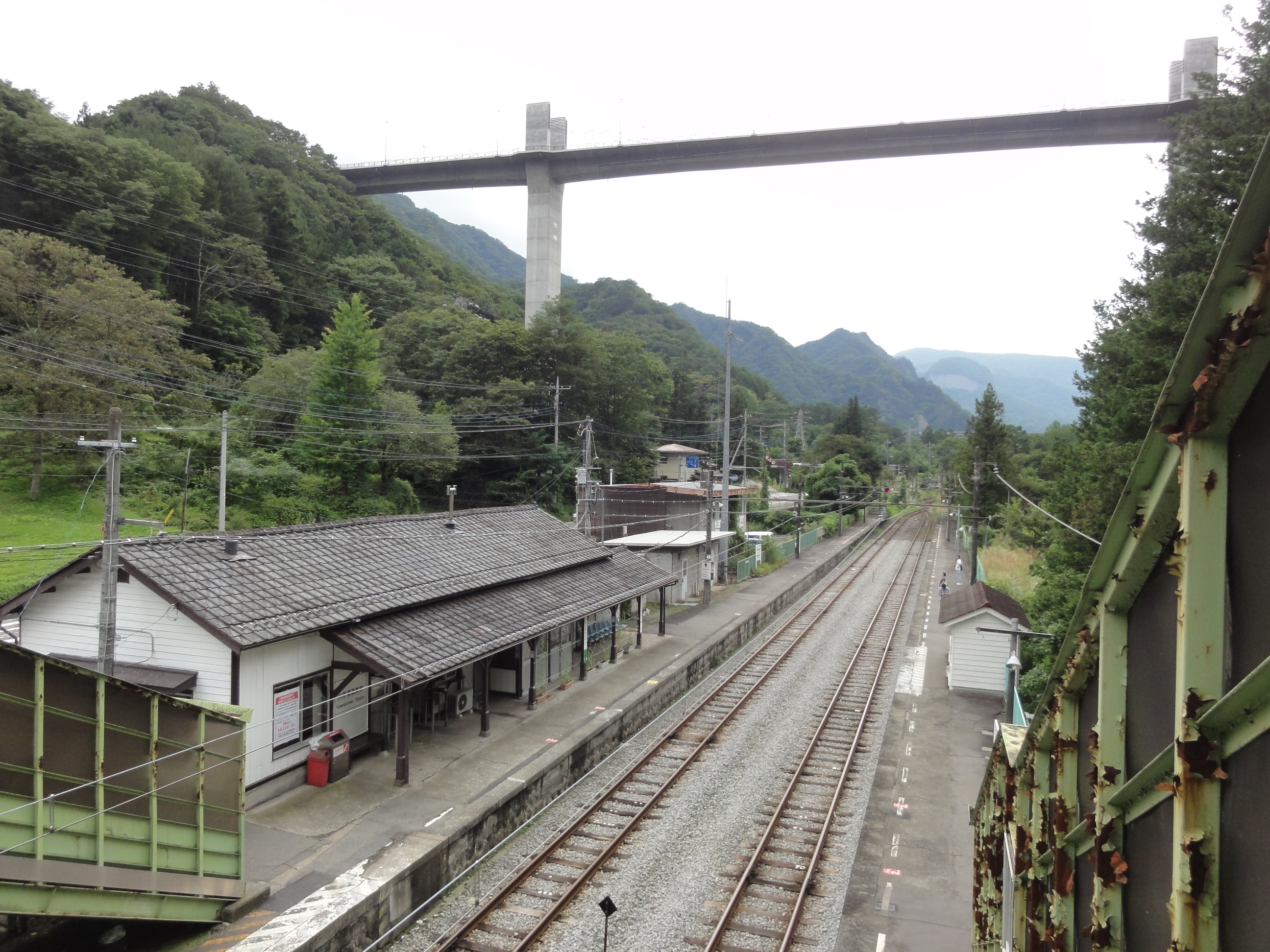
The platforms in September 2014

== History ==
The station opened on 20 April 1946, initially named Kawarayu Station (川原湯駅). With the privatization of Japanese National Railways (JNR) on 1 April 1987, the station came under the control of JR East. It was renamed Kawarayu-Onsen on 1 December 1991. The station building was remade in 2014.

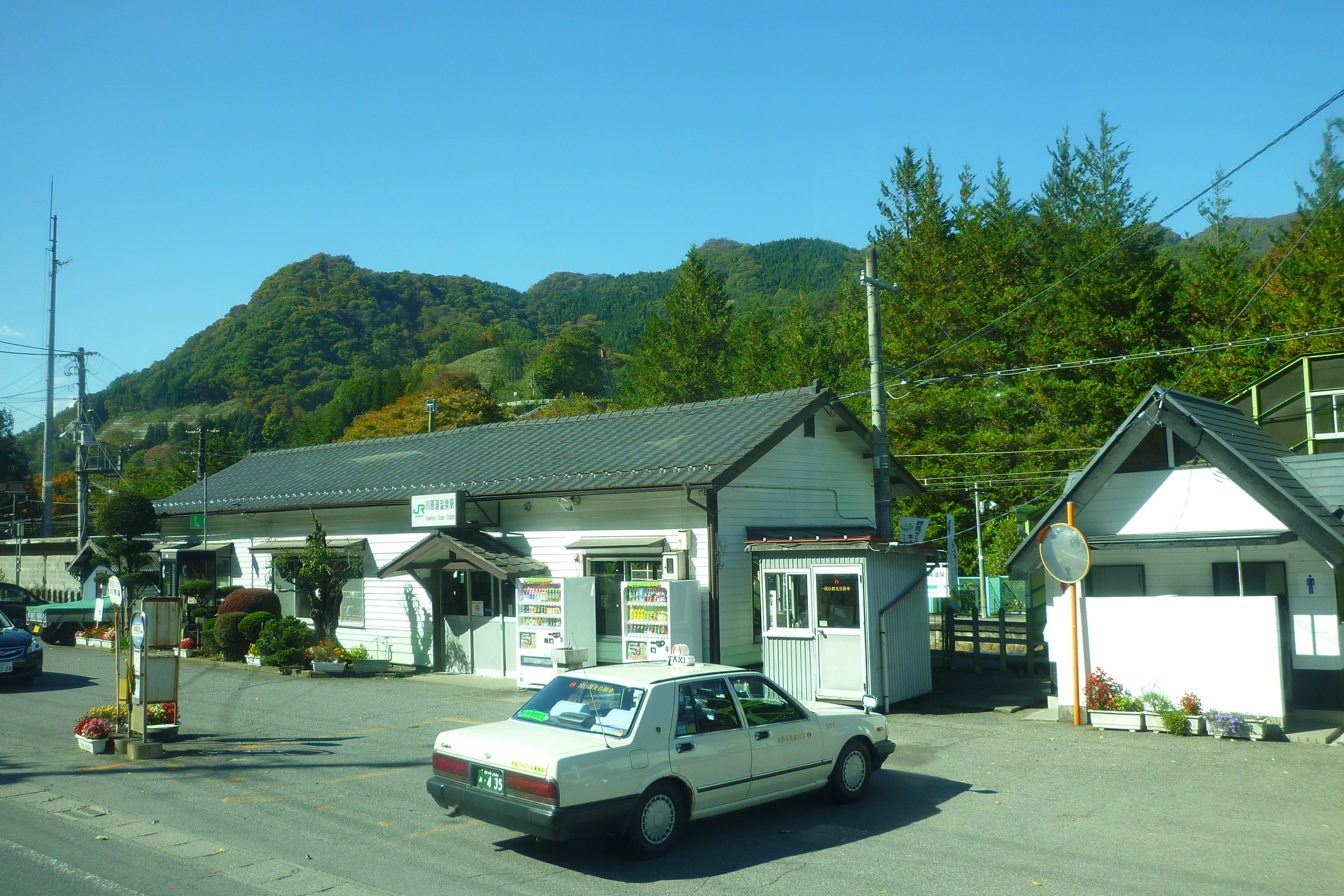
The previous station building in 2010

== Passenger statistics ==
In fiscal 2019, the station was used by an average of 18 passengers daily (boarding passengers only).

== Surrounding area ==
- Kawarayu Post Office
- Kawarayu Onsen
- National Route 145

== See also ==
- List of railway stations in Japan
