= Shin-Maebashi Station =

Railway station in Maebashi, Gunma Prefecture, Japan

Shin-Maebashi Station 新前橋駅
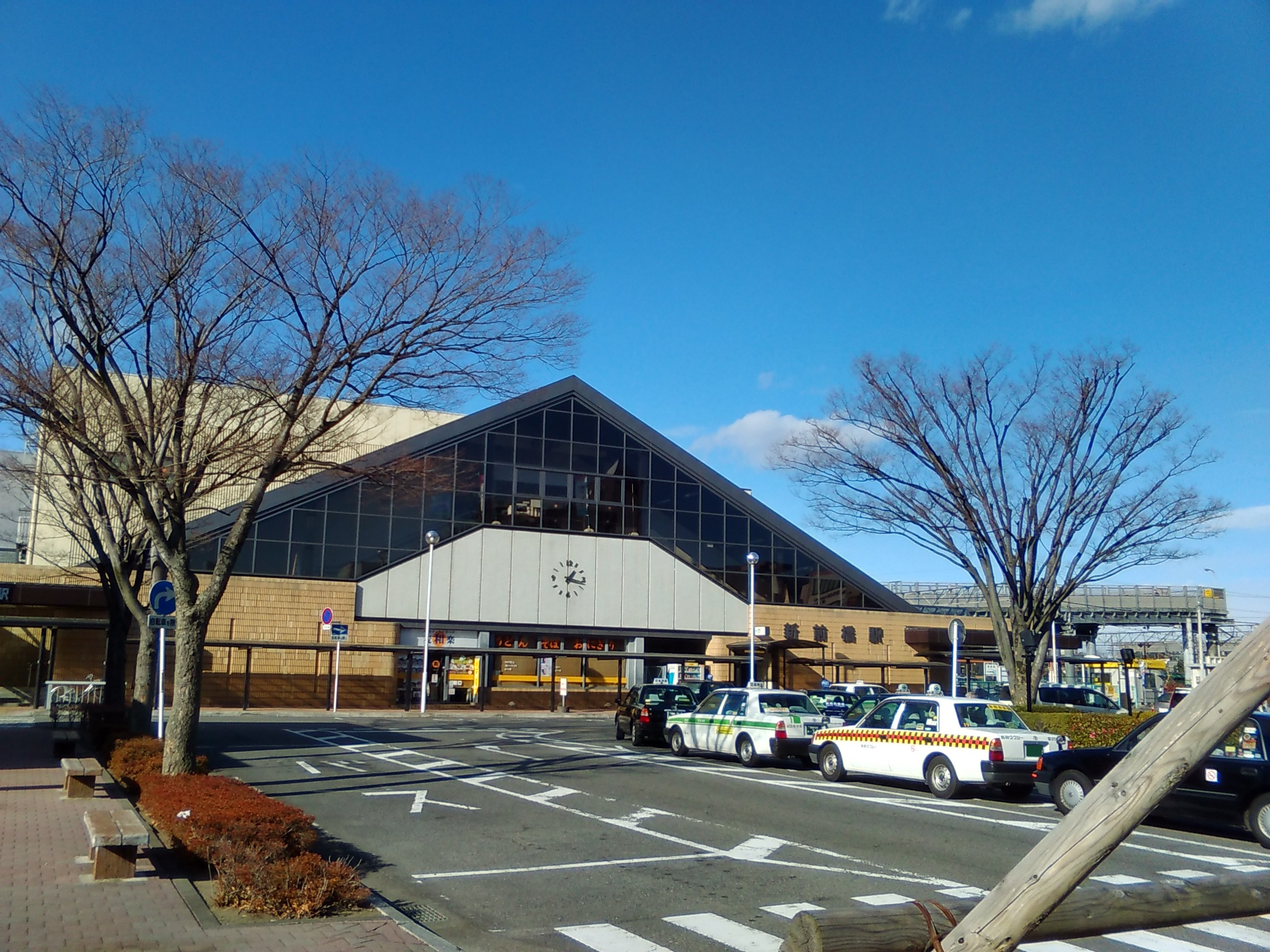
- Shin-Maebashi Station, 2018

General information
- Location: Furuichi-machi 471, Maebashi-shi, Gunma-ken 371-0844; Japan
- Coordinates: 36°22′45″N 139°02′49″E
- Operator: JR East
- Lines: Ryōmō Line; Jōetsu Line; Agatsuma Line
- Distance: 84.4 kilometres (52.4 mi) from Oyama
- Platforms: 2 island platforms

Other information
- Status: Staffed

History
- Opened: 1 July 1921; 105 years ago

Passengers
- FY2021: 4,804 daily

Services
Preceding station	JR East	Following station
Takasaki towards Ueno	Kusatsu	Shibukawa towards Naganohara-Kusatsuguchi
Ino towards Takasaki	Jōetsu Line	Gumma-Sōja towards Nagaoka
Ino towards Takasaki	Agatsuma Line	Gumma-Sōja towards Ōmae
Ino towards Takasaki	Ryōmō Line	Maebashi towards Oyama
Ino towards Tokyo	Takasaki Line Local; Ryōmō Line through-service	Maebashi Terminus
Ino towards Odawara	Shōnan–Shinjuku Line Rapid	Maebashi Terminus
Location
- Location within Gunma Prefecture Location within Japan

Shin-Maebashi Station (Note: Written as Shim-Maebashi by JR on the station signage) (新前橋駅, Shin-Maebashi-eki) is a passenger railway station in the city of Maebashi, Gunma Prefecture, Japan, operated by East Japan Railway Company (JR East).

== Lines ==
Shin-Maebashi Station is served by the Ryōmō Line, and is located 84.4 km (52.4 mi) from the terminus of the line at Oyama Station. It is also served by the Jōetsu Line and is 7.3 km (4.5 mi) from Takasaki Station. Trains of the Agatsuma Line, which nominally ends at Shibukawa, normally continue over the Jōetsu Line to terminate at Shin-Maebashi instead.

== Station layout ==
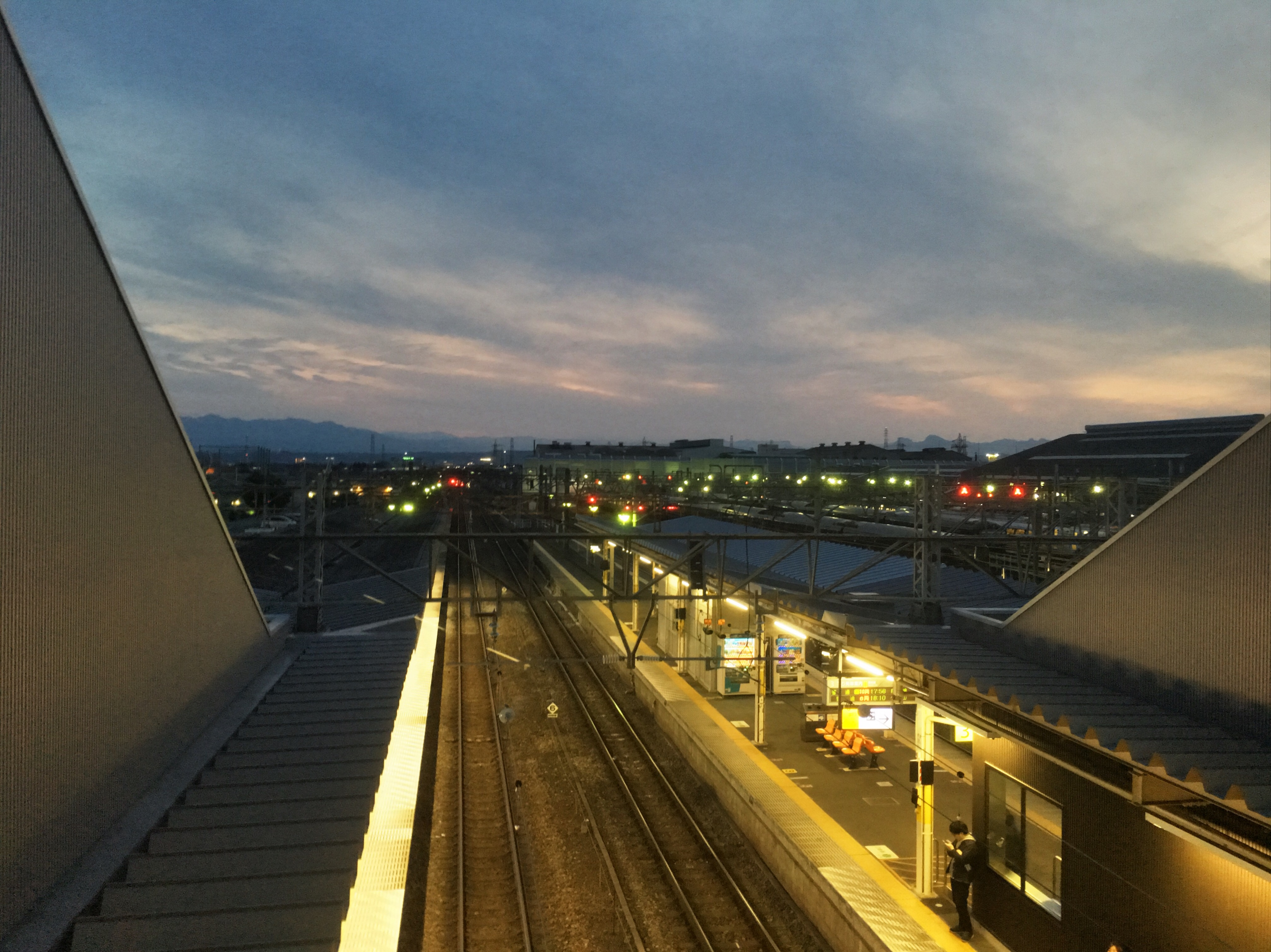
Platforms at night, 2020

Shin-Maebashi Station has two island platforms serving four tracks, with the station building overhead. The station has many accessibility features such as escalators, elevators, mobility scooter access, wheelchair-accessible bathrooms, and a braille fare table. The station also contains a train depot under the jurisdiction of the Takasaki Branch of JR East.

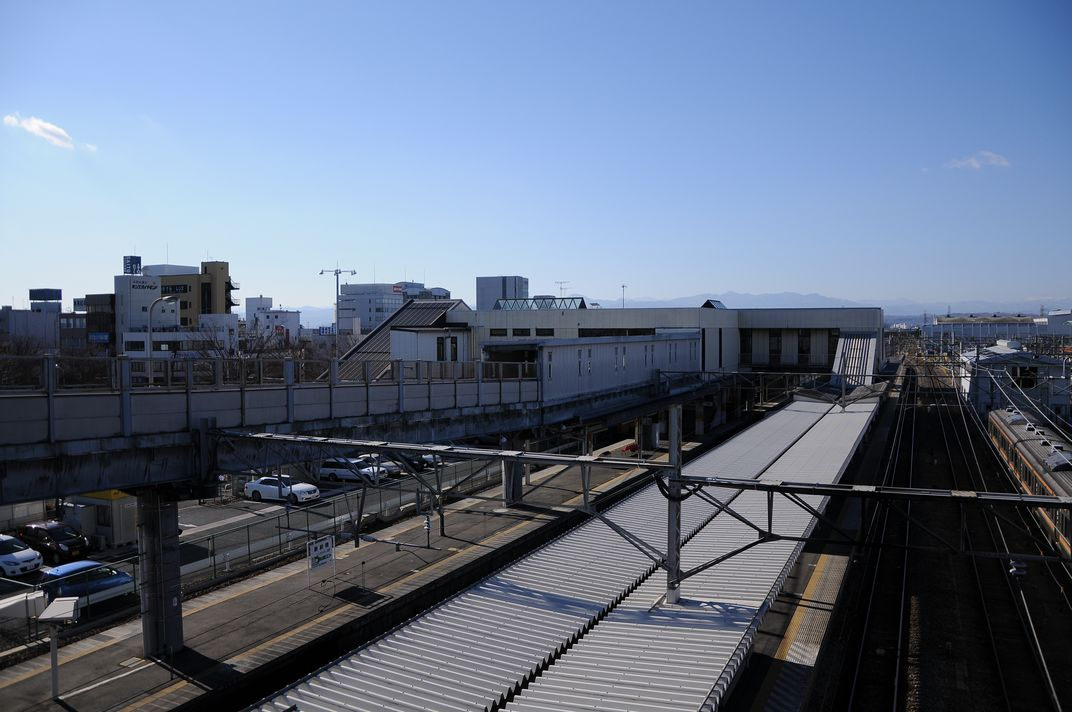
Platforms viewed from the station building January 2014

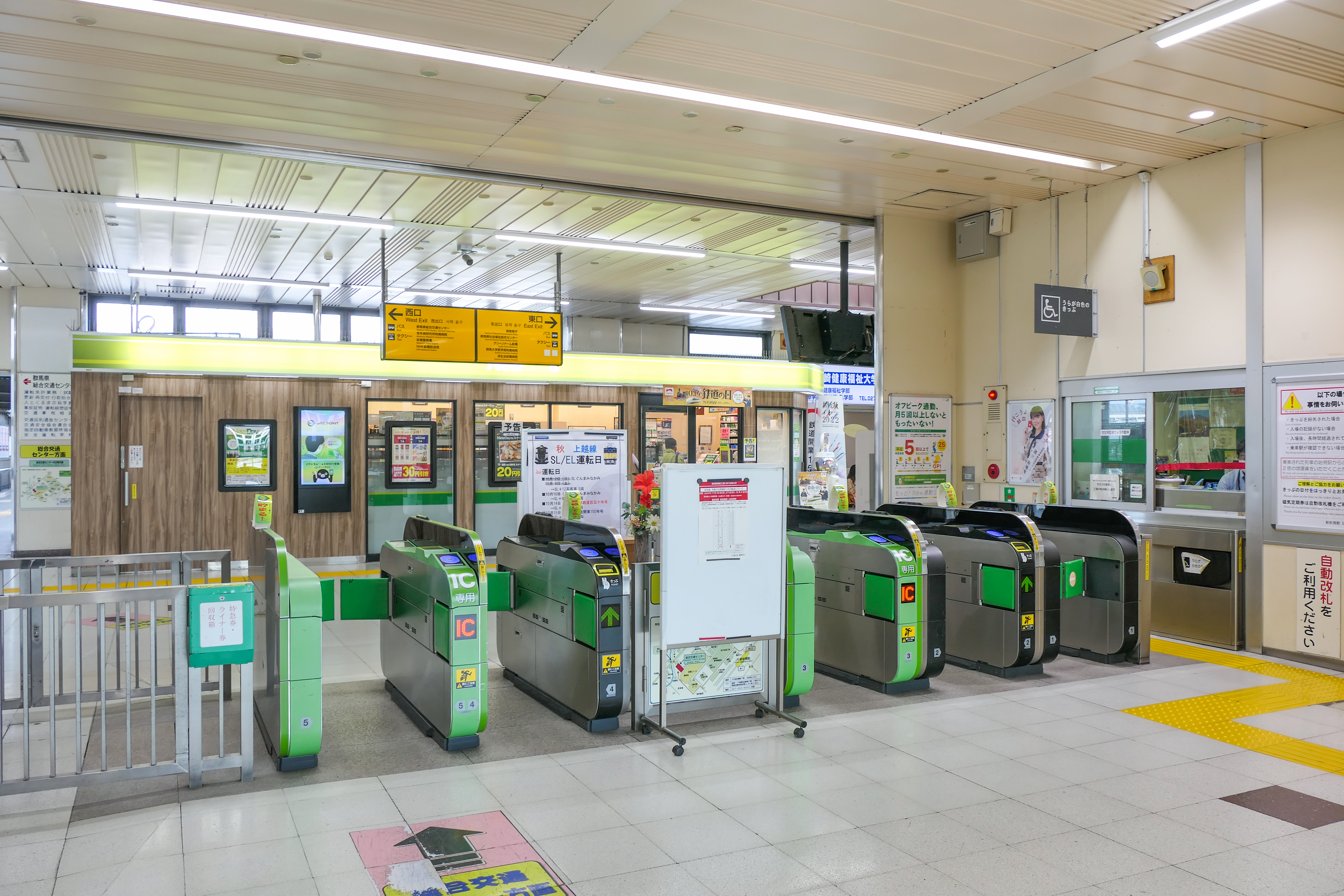
Ticket Gate October 2022

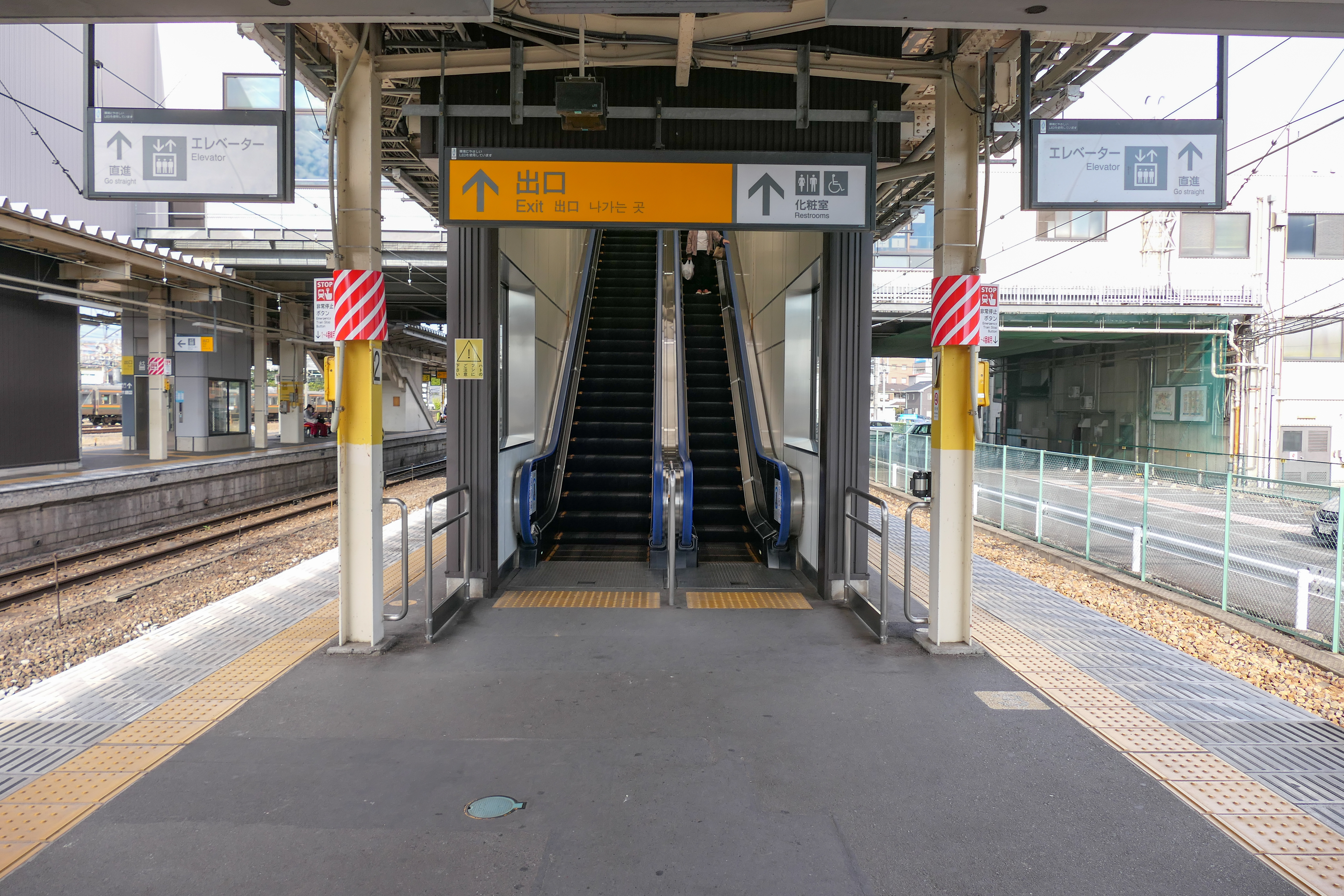
Platforms 1 and 2 October 2022

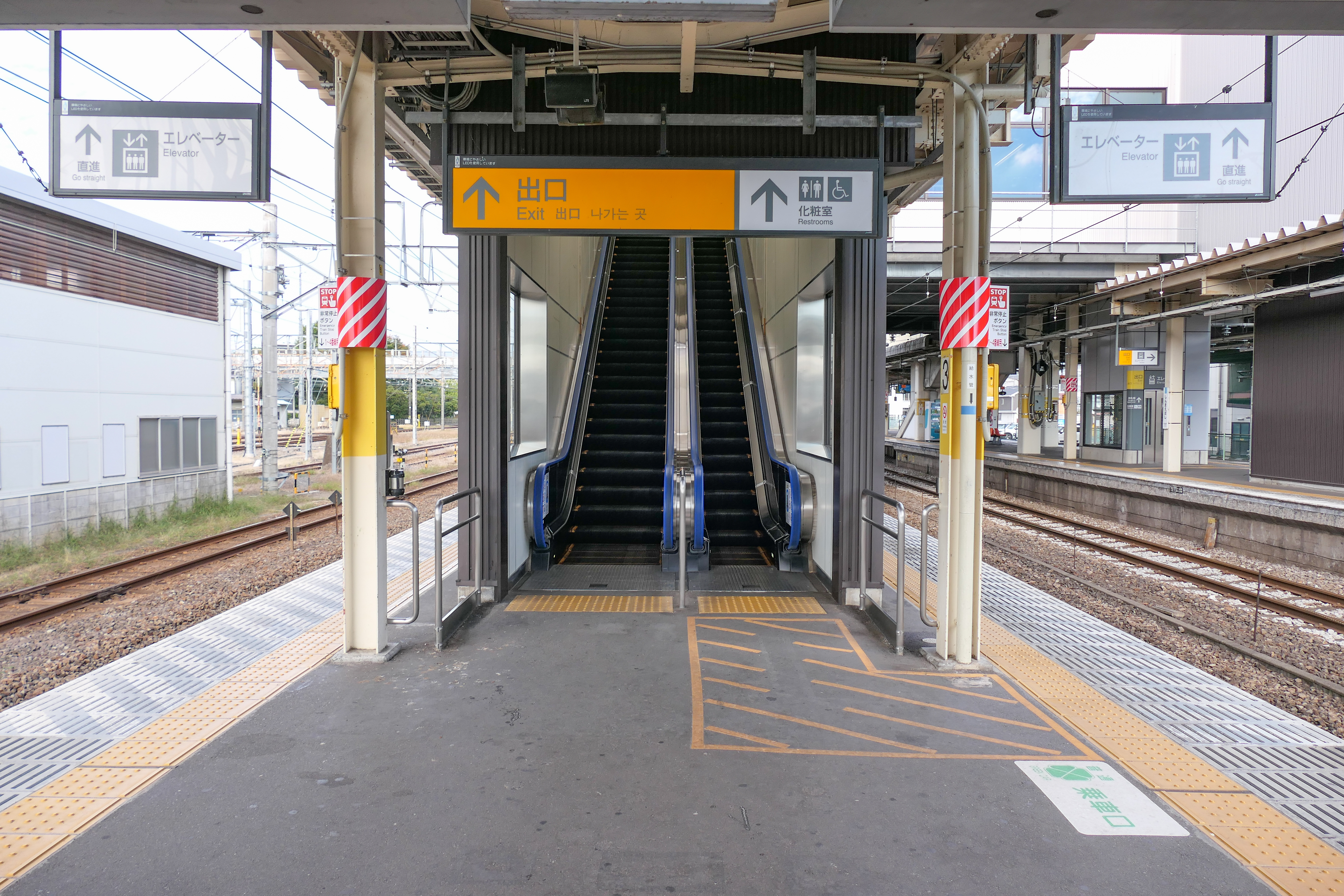
Platforms 3 and 4 October 2022

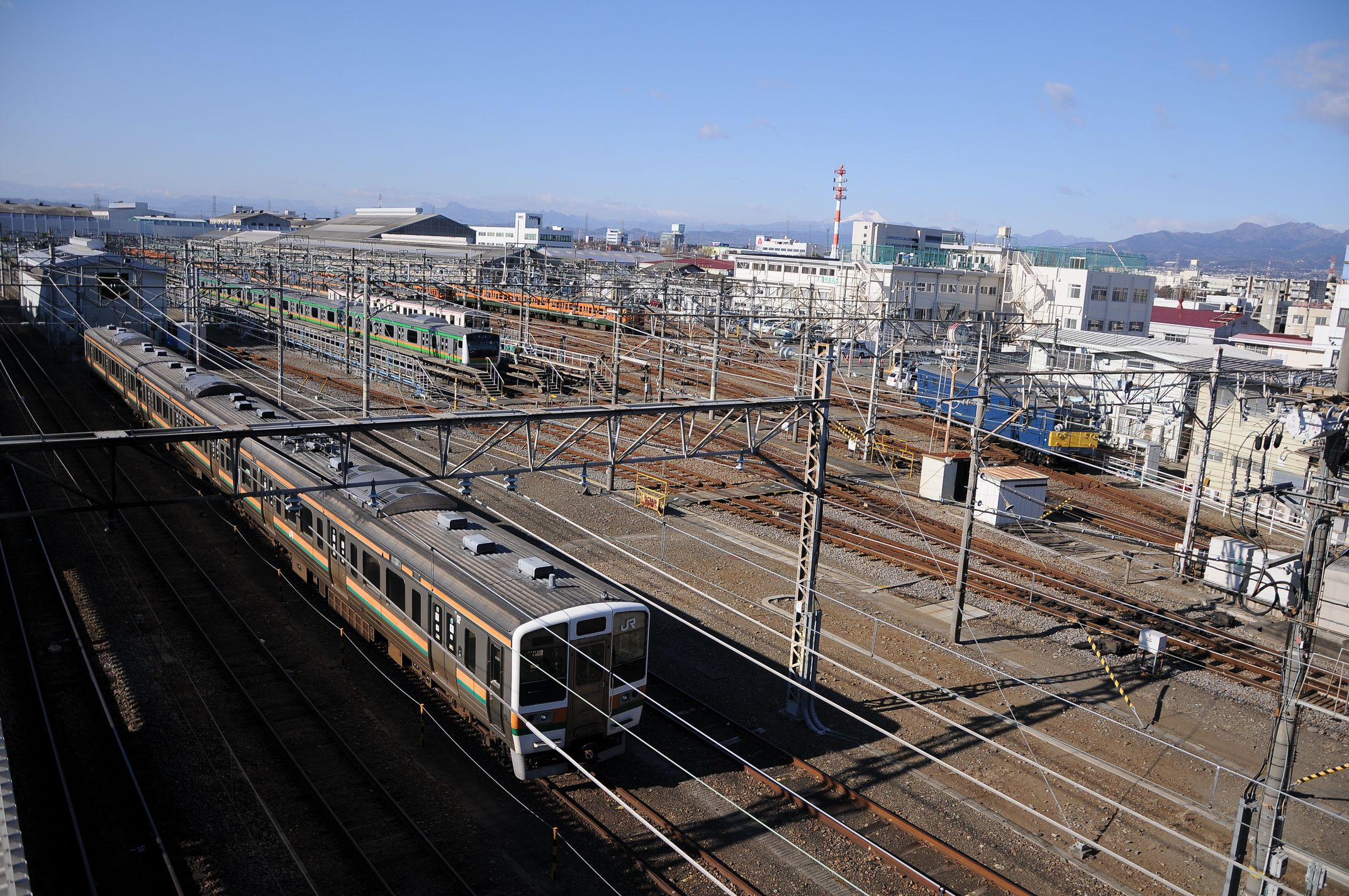
Takasaki Train Depot January 2014

=== Platforms ===
1; 2	■ Jōetsu Line	for Takasaki
1; 2	Shōnan-Shinjuku Line	for Takasaki, Kumagaya, Shinjuku and Yokohama
1; 2	Takasaki Line via (Ueno-Tokyo Line)	for Takasaki, Kumagaya, Tokyo and Yokohama
3	■ Ryōmō Line	for Maebashi, Isesaki, Kiryū and Oyama
4	■ Jōetsu Line	for Shibukawa and Minakami
4	■ Agatsuma Line	for Nakanojō and Naganohara-Kusatsuguchi

=== Station facilities ===
- NewDays Shin-Maebashi
- Nora Gorilla (restaurant)

== History ==
Shin-Maebashi Station was opened on 1 July 1921 to serve as a link between the newly opened Jōetsu Line and the Ryōmō Line. On 17 March 1987, the Midori no Madoguchi ticket office opens. The station was absorbed into the JR East network upon the privatization of the Japanese National Railways (JNR) on 1 April 1987. In 2011, Shin-Maebashi station was renovated.

The station started accepting Suica cards on November 18, 2001 for Takasaki and Maebashi bound trains. On 16 October 2004, Suica cards were also accepted for Shibukawa bound trains.The Midori no Madoguchi ticket office was closed on 15 February 2023.

== Passenger statistics ==
In fiscal 2021, the station was used by an average of 4,804 passengers daily (boarding passengers only).

Below is table containing the passenger statistics since the year 2000:

Passenger statistics
Year	Average Daily Boarding Passengers	Year	Average Daily Boarding Passengers	Year	Average Daily Boarding Passengers
2000	6,045	2010	5,899	2020	4,441
2001	6,036	2011	5,789	2021	4,804
2002	6,032	2012	5,877		
2003	5,940	2013	6,029		
2004	5,858	2014	5,845		
2005	5,788	2015	5,970		
2006	5,801	2016	6,055		
2007	5,797	2017	6,155		
2008	5,940	2018	6,237		
2009	5,928	2019	6,160		

== Surrounding area ==
- Jōmō Shimbun head office
- Ueno Soja Shrine
- Sakutarō Hagiwara Poetry Monument
- Forest Mall Shin-Maebashi
- Gunma Prefectural Social Welfare Center
- Daiso
- Shin-Maebashi Terminal
- Maebashi Ishikura Post Office
- NHK Maebashi Office
- Kan-etsu Expressway
- National Route 17

== See also ==
- List of railway stations in Japan
