= Iwashima Station =

Railway station in Higashiagatsuma, Gunma Prefecture, Japan

Iwashima Station 岩島駅
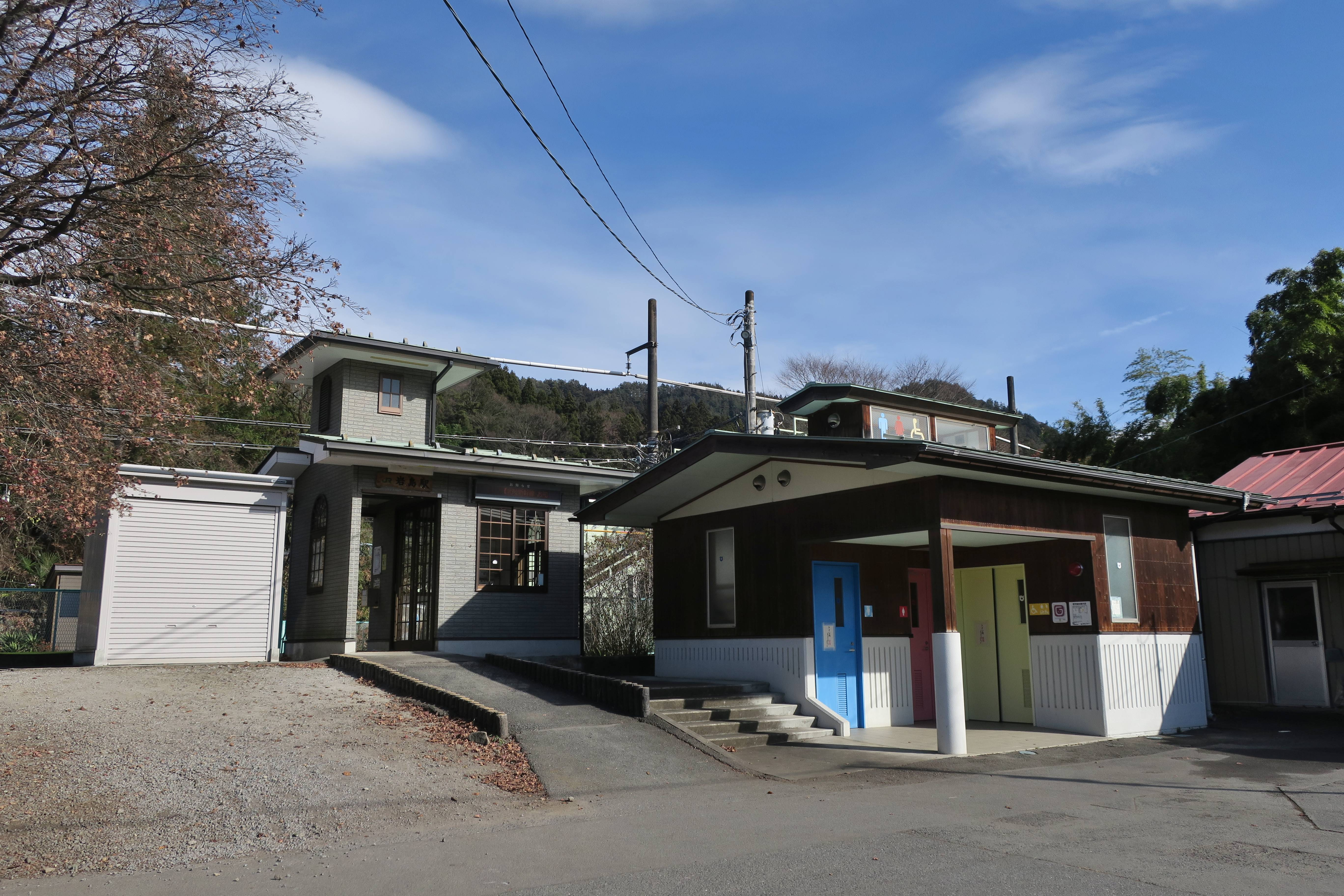
- Iwashima Station in December 2019

General information
- Location: Iwashita, Higashiagatsuma-machi, Agatsuma-gun, Gunma-ken 377-0815; Japan
- Coordinates: 36.5630°N 138.7598°E
- Operator: JR East
- Line: ■ Agatsuma Line
- Distance: 30.5 km from Shibukawa
- Platforms: 2 side platforms

Other information
- Status: Unstaffed
- Website: Official website

History
- Opened: 20 November 1945

Passengers
- FY2011: 47

Services
Preceding station	JR East	Following station
Kawarayu-Onsen towards Ōmae	Agatsuma Line	Yagura towards Takasaki
Location
- Location within Gunma Prefecture Location within Japan

Iwashima Station (岩島駅, Iwashima-eki) is a passenger railway station in the town of Higashiagatsuma, Gunma Prefecture, Japan, operated by East Japan Railway Company (JR East).

== Lines ==
Iwashima Station is a station on the Agatsuma Line, and is located 30.5 kilometres from the terminus of the line at Shibukawa Station.

== Station layout ==
Then station consists two opposed side platforms connected by a footbridge. The station is unattended.

=== Platforms ===
1	■ Agatsuma Line	for Manza-Kazawaguchi and Ōmae
2	■ Agatsuma Line	for Naganohara-Kusatsuguchi and Takasaki

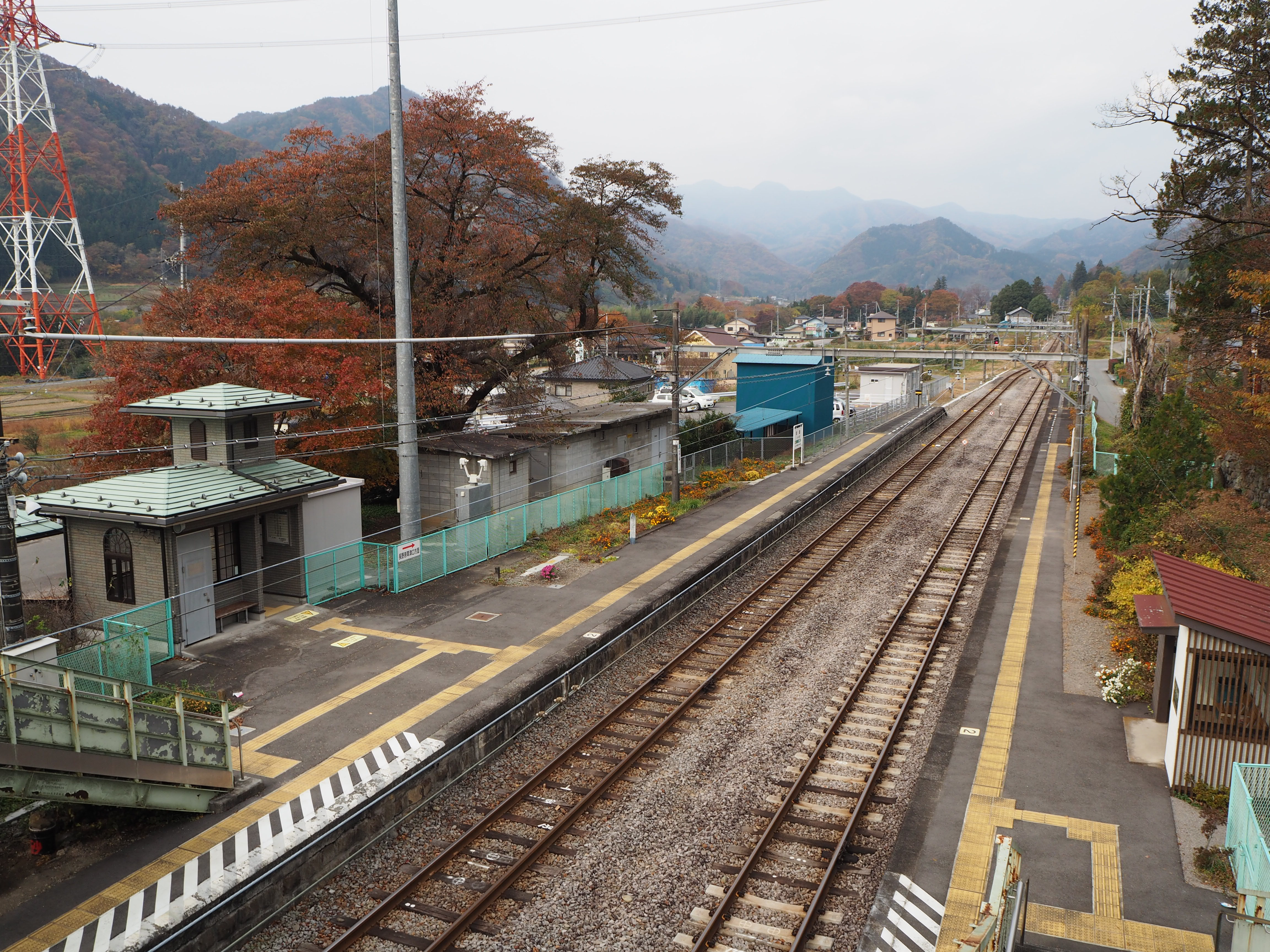
Iwashima Station platforms in November 2015

== History ==
Iwashima Station was opened on 5 August 1945 for freight only. Passenger services began from 20 November 1945. The station was absorbed into the JR East network upon the privatization of the Japanese National Railways (JNR) on 1 April 1987.

== Surrounding area ==
- Agatsuma Canyon
- Kawanaka Onsen
- Matsunoyu Onsen

== See also ==
- List of railway stations in Japan
