= Nakanojō Station =

Railway station in Nakanojō, Gunma Prefecture, Japan

Nakanojō Station 中之条駅
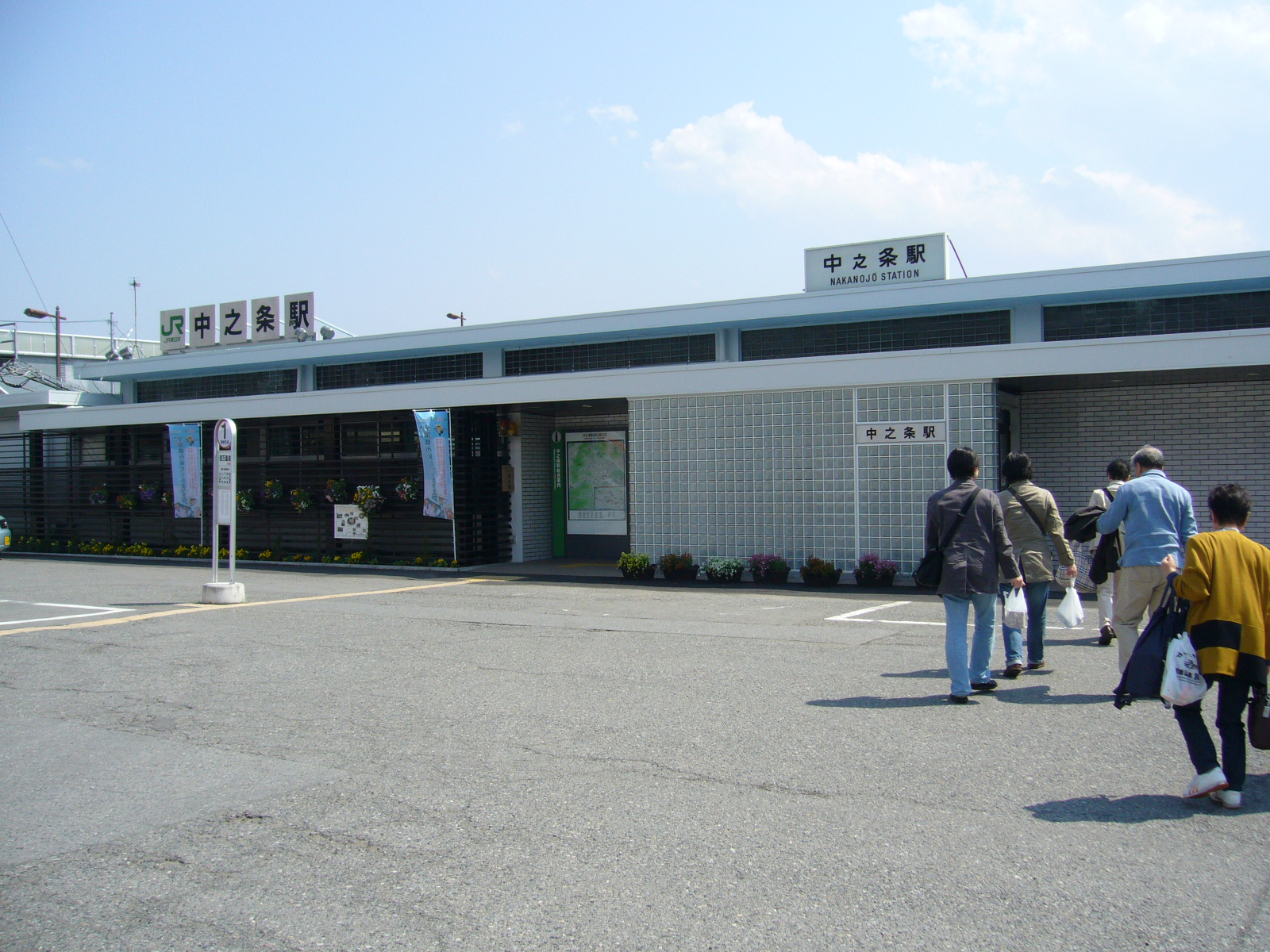
- Nakanojō Station, April 2008

General information
- Location: Isecho 815-4, Nakanojō-machi, Agatsuma-gun, Gunma-ken 377-0423; Japan
- Coordinates: 36.5855°N 138.8511°E
- Operator: JR East
- Line: ■ Agatsuma Line
- Distance: 19.8 kilometres (12.3 mi) from Shibukawa
- Platforms: 1 side + 1 island platform

Other information
- Status: Staffed
- Website: Official website

History
- Opened: 5 August 1945

Passengers
- FY2019: 971

Services
Preceding station	JR East	Following station
Naganohara-Kusatsuguchi Terminus	Kusatsu	Shibukawa towards Ueno
Gunma-Haramachi towards Ōmae	Agatsuma Line	Ichishiro towards Takasaki
Location
- Location within Gunma Prefecture Location within Japan

Nakanojō Station (中之条駅, Nakanojō-eki) is a passenger railway station in the town of Nakanojō, Gunma Prefecture, Japan, operated by East Japan Railway Company (JR East).

== Lines ==
Nakanojō Station is a station on the Agatsuma Line, and is located 19.8 rail kilometers from the terminus of the line at Shibukawa Station.

== Station layout ==
The station consists of a single side platform and a single island platform connected to the station building by a footbridge. The station is staffed.

=== Platforms ===
1	■ Agatsuma Line	for Shibukawa and Takasaki
2	■ Agatsuma Line	for Naganohara-Kusatsuguchi, Manza-Kazawaguchi
3	■ Agatsuma Line	not in normal use

== History ==
Nakanojō Station was opened on 5 August 1945. The station was absorbed into the JR East network upon the privatization of the Japanese National Railways (JNR) on 1 April 1987.

== Passenger statistics ==
In fiscal 2019, the station was used by an average of 971 passengers daily (boarding passengers only).

== Surrounding area ==
- Nakanojō Town Hall
- Nakanojō Post Office
- Shima Onsen

== See also ==
- List of railway stations in Japan
