= Agatsuma Line =

Railway line in Gunma prefecture, Japan

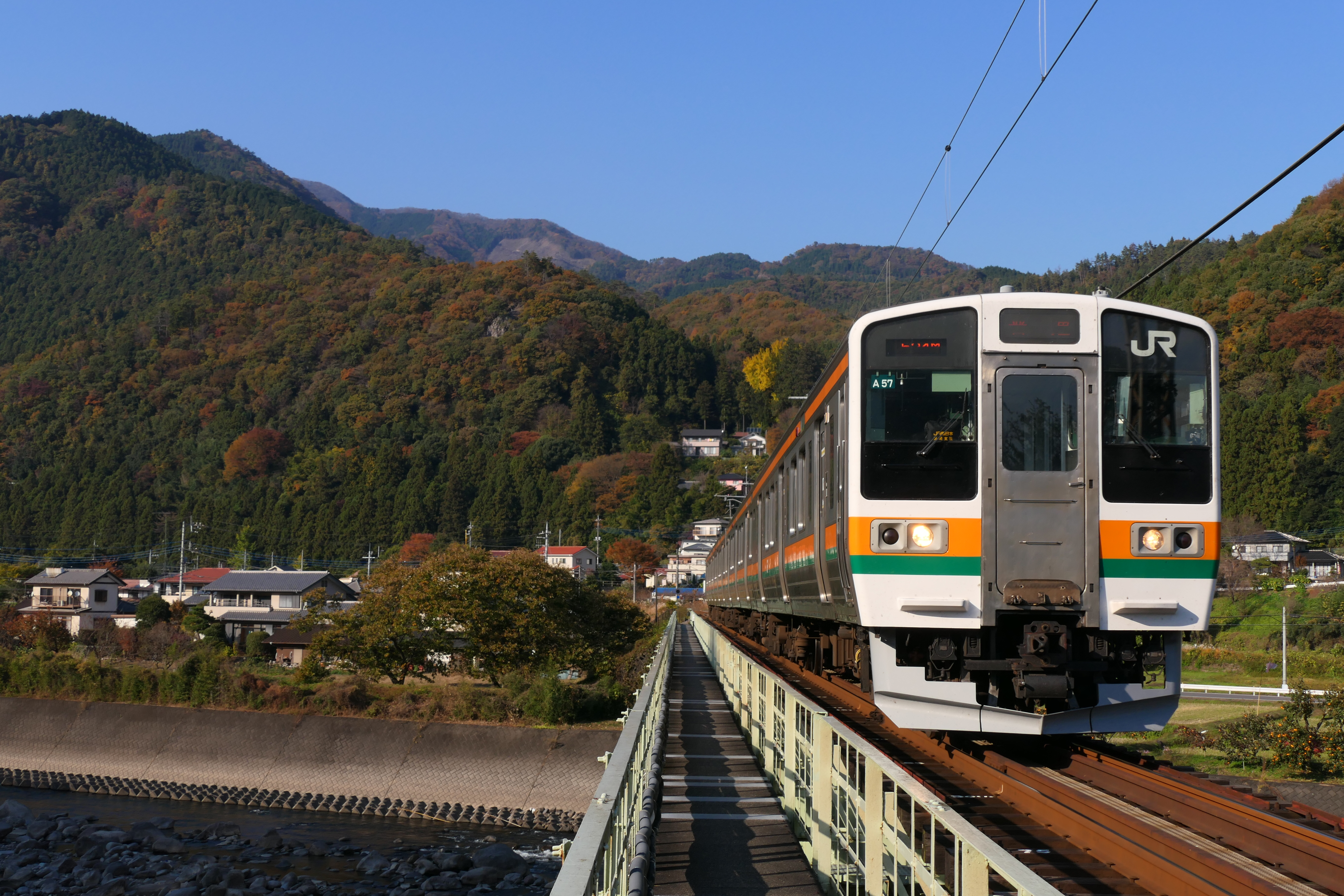
- A 211 series EMU, 2020

Overview
- Native name: 吾妻線
- Owner: JR East
- Locale: Gunma Prefecture
- Termini: Shibukawa; Ōmae
- Stations: 18

Service
- Type: Regional rail

History
- Opened: 2 January 1945; 81 years ago

Technical
- Line length: 55.6 km (34.5 mi)
- Track gauge: 1,067 mm (3 ft 6 in)
- Electrification: 1,500 V DC overhead catenary
Route map

The Agatsuma Line (吾妻線, Agatsuma-sen) is a local rail line in Gunma, Japan, and is part of the East Japan Railway Company (JR East) network. Approximately following the Agatsuma River, it is 55.6 km between Shibukawa and Ōmae stations.

== Operations ==
Although the official start of the line is at Shibukawa, all trains run through on the Jōetsu Line to/from either Shin-Maebashi or Takasaki.

Local trains run approximately once every hour, terminating at either Naganohara-Kusatsuguchi or Ōmae.

Limited Express Kusatsu/Shima trains operate between Ueno in Tokyo and Naganohara-Kusatsuguchi on the Agatsuma Line, stopping only at Shibukawa and Nakanojō. Depending on the day of the week, between 2 and 4 round trips operate each day, operating towards Naganohara-Kusatsuguchi in the morning, and towards Ueno in the afternoon.

== Stations ==
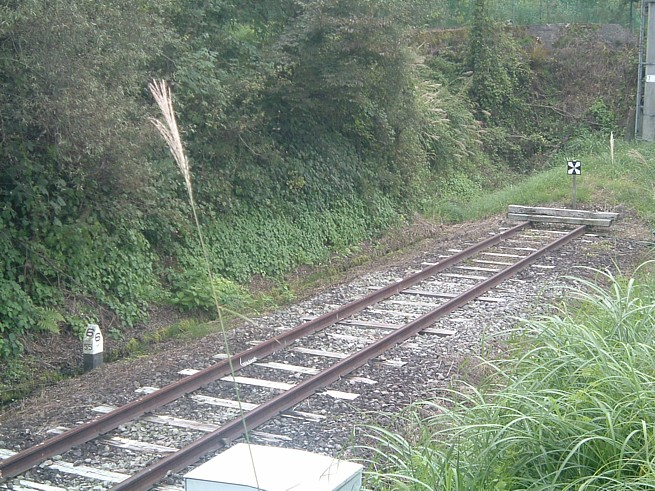
55.6 km post marking the end of the line at Ōmae Station

All stations are in the Gunma Prefecture. Local trains stop at all stations.

Legend:

- ● : Limited Express Kusatsu/Shima stops
- ｜: Limited Express Kusatsu/Shima does not stop
- ∥ : Limited Express Kusatsu/Shima does not travel within this section

| Station | Japanese | Distance (km) | | Limited Express Kusatsu/Shima | Transfers | Location |
| Station | Japanese | Between stations | Total | Limited Express Kusatsu/Shima | Transfers | Location |
|---|---|---|---|---|---|---|
| Shibukawa | 渋川 | | 0.0 | ● | ■ Jōetsu Line (all trains through service to Shin-Maebashi or Takasaki) | Shibukawa |
| Kanashima | 金島 | 5.5 | 5.5 | ｜ | | Shibukawa |
| Ubashima | 祖母島 | 2.2 | 7.7 | ｜ | | Shibukawa |
| Onogami | 小野上 | 4.2 | 11.9 | ｜ | | Shibukawa |
| Onogami-Onsen | 小野上温泉 | 1.8 | 13.7 | ｜ | | Shibukawa |
| Ichishiro | 市城 | 2.3 | 16.4 | ｜ | | Nakanojō, Agatsuma District |
| Nakanojō | 中之条 | 3.4 | 19.8 | ● | | Nakanojō, Agatsuma District |
| Gunma-Haramachi | 群馬原町 | 3.1 | 22.9 | ｜ | | Higashiagatsuma, Agatsuma District |
| Gōbara | 郷原 | 3.4 | 26.3 | ｜ | | Higashiagatsuma, Agatsuma District |
| Yagura | 矢倉 | 1.7 | 28.0 | ｜ | | Higashiagatsuma, Agatsuma District |
| Iwashima | 岩島 | 2.5 | 30.5 | ｜ | | Higashiagatsuma, Agatsuma District |
| Kawarayu-Onsen | 川原湯温泉 | 5.9 | 36.4 | ｜ | | Naganohara, Agatsuma District |
| Naganohara-Kusatsuguchi | 長野原草津口 | 5.9 | 42.3 | ● | | Naganohara, Agatsuma District |
| Gunma-Ōtsu | 群馬大津 | 2.2 | 44.5 | ∥ | | Naganohara, Agatsuma District |
| Haneo | 羽根尾 | 2.2 | 46.7 | ∥ | | Naganohara, Agatsuma District |
| Fukurogura | 袋倉 | 2.9 | 49.6 | ∥ | | Tsumagoi, Agatsuma District |
| Manza-Kazawaguchi | 万座・鹿沢口 | 2.9 | 52.5 | ∥ | | Tsumagoi, Agatsuma District |
| Ōmae | 大前 | 3.1 | 55.6 | ∥ | | Tsumagoi, Agatsuma District |

== Rolling stock ==
=== Present ===
- 211-3000 series 4-car EMUs (since August 2016)
- E257-5000 series
- E257-5500 series

=== Former ===
- 115-1000 series 4-car EMUs (until March 2018)
- 185 series 7-car EMUs (Kusatsu limited express services until March 2014)
- 651-1000 series

Four-car 211 series EMUs entered service on the line from 22 August 2016.

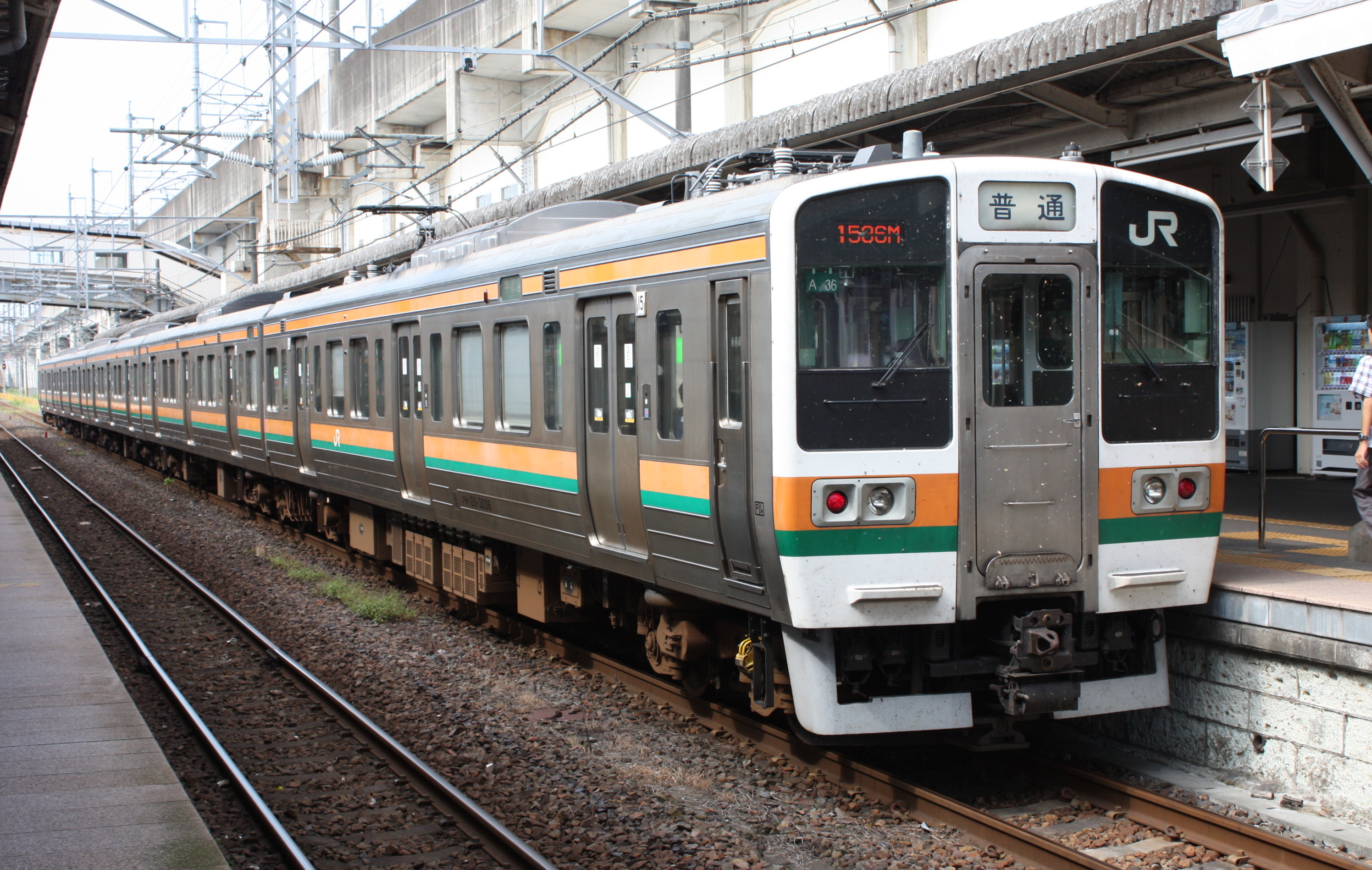
A 211-3000 series EMU

== History ==
The line opened on 2 January 1945 as the freight-only Naganohara Line (長野原線) operating between Shibukawa and Naganohara Station (長野原駅) (present-day Naganohara-Kusatsuguchi Station). Passenger services were introduced as far as Nakanojō from 5 August 1945, to Iwashima from 20 November 1945, and to Naganohara-Kusatsuguchi from 20 April 1946.

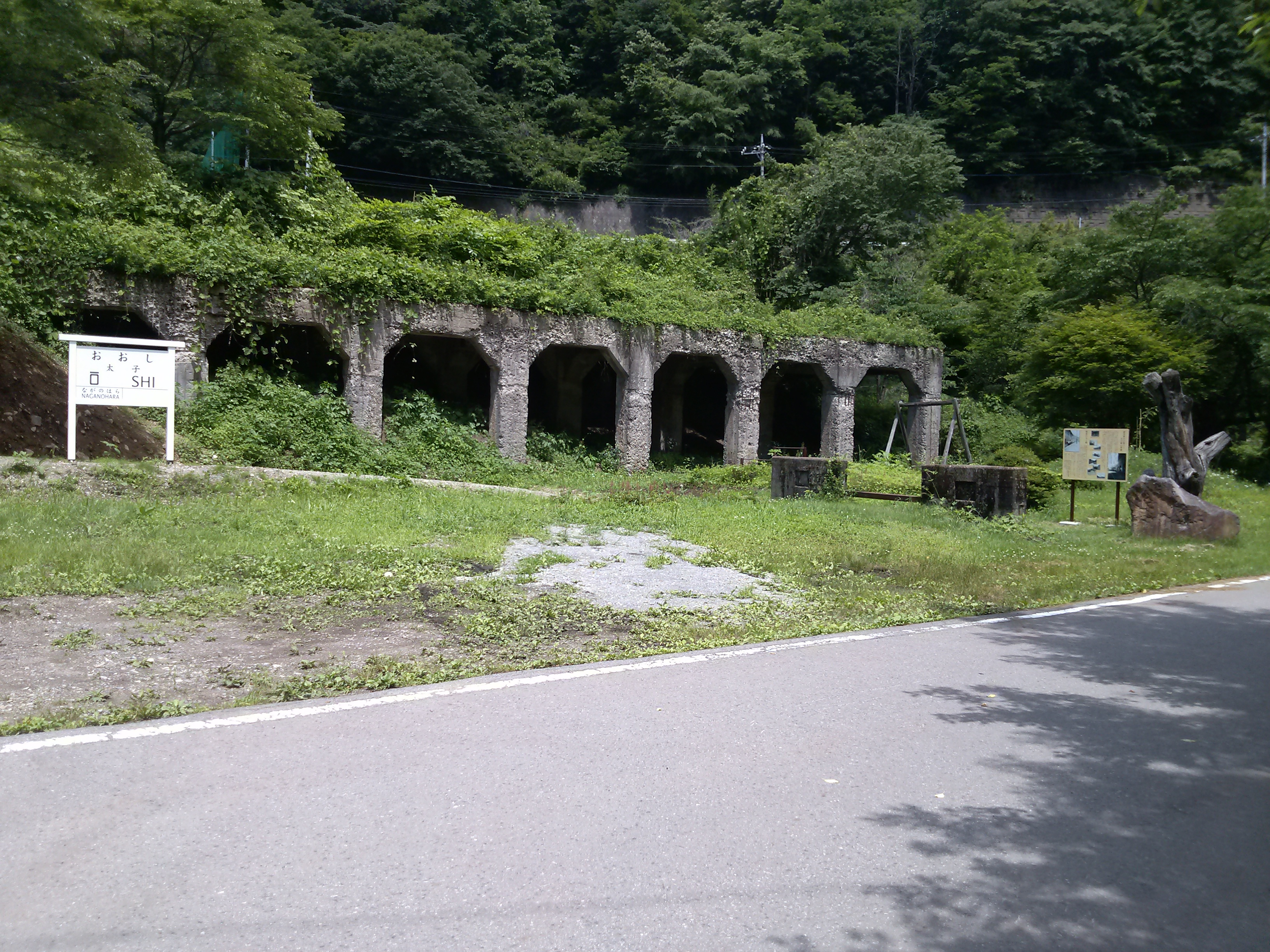
The remains of the former Ōshi Station in June 2013

On 1 October 1952, the line was extended to Ōshi Station (太子駅), initially for freight only, but passengers services were also introduced from 21 June 1954. Freight services between Shibukawa and Ōshi ceased as of 1 October 1966.

Services on the section between Naganohara and Ōshi were suspended as of 1 November 1970, and on 7 March 1971, a new line was opened beyond Naganohara to Ōmae, with the entire line renamed Agatsuma Line at the same time. The Naganohara-Kusatsuguchi to Ōshi line was formally closed as of 1 May 1971. CTC signalling on the entire line was also commissioned at the same time.

With the privatization of JNR on 1 April 1987, the Agatsuma Line came under the ownership of JR East.

It had been proposed to extend the line to Nagano, but geological exploratory drilling revealed extensive faulting beyond Ōmae, and as any extension would have required extensive tunnelling, this was considered impractical.

== Yamba Dam construction ==
The construction of the Yamba Dam required the realignment of the Agatsuma line between Iwashima and Naganohara-Kusatsuguchi. Work on the diversion was well advanced when a change of government in 2009 resulted in the project being halted. Another change of government in 2012 revived the project. Services on the old section of the line were suspended following the last scheduled service on 24 September 2014 to allow commissioning of the new alignment. The new alignment opened for passenger services on 1 October 2014. The new route is 0.3 km (0.19 mi) shorter, resulting in the shortest tunnel in Japan, the 7 m (23 ft) Tarusawa Tunnel, being abandoned, although it is not inundated by the new dam.

== Points of interest ==
The Agatsuma Line is noted for numerous onsen hot springs along the route. The famous hot springs at Kusatsu are some distance north of the line, but several rural onsen such as those at Shima, Sawatari, Kawarayu, and Shiriyaki are more accessible.

Mount Asama, Mount Kusatsu-Shirane, and the Agatsuma Canyon can all be seen from the Agatsuma Line, though the canyon will be inundated when the Yamba Dam is commissioned.
