= Ichishiro Station =

Railway station in Nakanojō, Gunma Prefecture, Japan

Ichishiro Station 市城駅
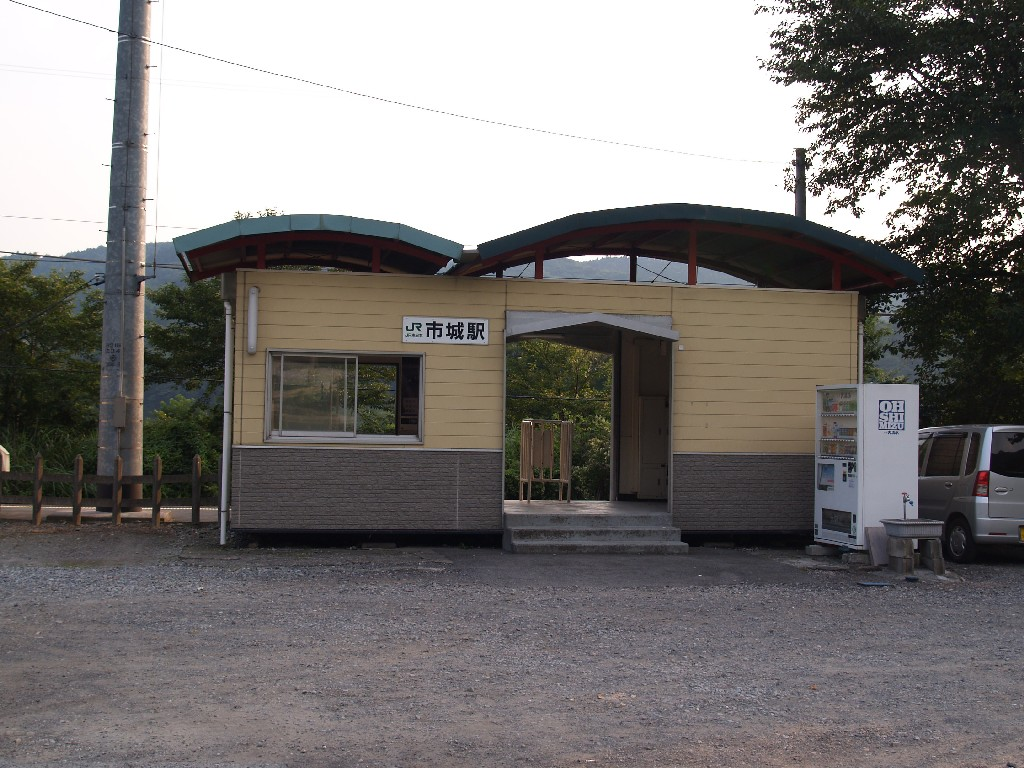
- Ichishiro Station, August 2007

General information
- Location: Ichishiro 442, Nakanojō-machi, Agatsuma-gun, Gunma-ken 377-0421; Japan
- Coordinates: 36.5709°N 138.8823°E
- Operator: JR East
- Line: ■ Agatsuma Line
- Distance: 16.4 km from Shibukawa
- Platforms: 1 side platform

Other information
- Status: Unstaffed
- Website: Official website

History
- Opened: 20 November 1945

Passengers
- FY2011: 60

Services
Preceding station	JR East	Following station
Nakanojō towards Ōmae	Agatsuma Line	Onogami-Onsen towards Takasaki
Location
- Location within Gunma Prefecture Location within Japan

Ichishiro Station (市城駅, Ichishiro-eki) is a passenger railway station in the town of Nakanojō, Gunma Prefecture, Japan, operated by East Japan Railway Company (JR East).

== Lines ==
Ichishiro Station is a station on the Agatsuma Line, and is located 16.4 rail kilometers from the terminus of the line at Shibukawa Station.

== Station layout ==
The station consists of a single side platform with a modified freight container used as the station building. The station is unattended.

== History ==
Ichishiro Station was opened on 20 November 1945. The station was absorbed into the JR East network upon the privatization of the Japanese National Railways (JNR) on 1 April 1987.

== Surrounding area ==
- Azuma Onsen

== See also ==
- List of railway stations in Japan
