= Tarusawa Tunnel =

Former shortest railway tunnel in Japan

Coordinates: 36°33′50.2″N 138°43′21.2″E

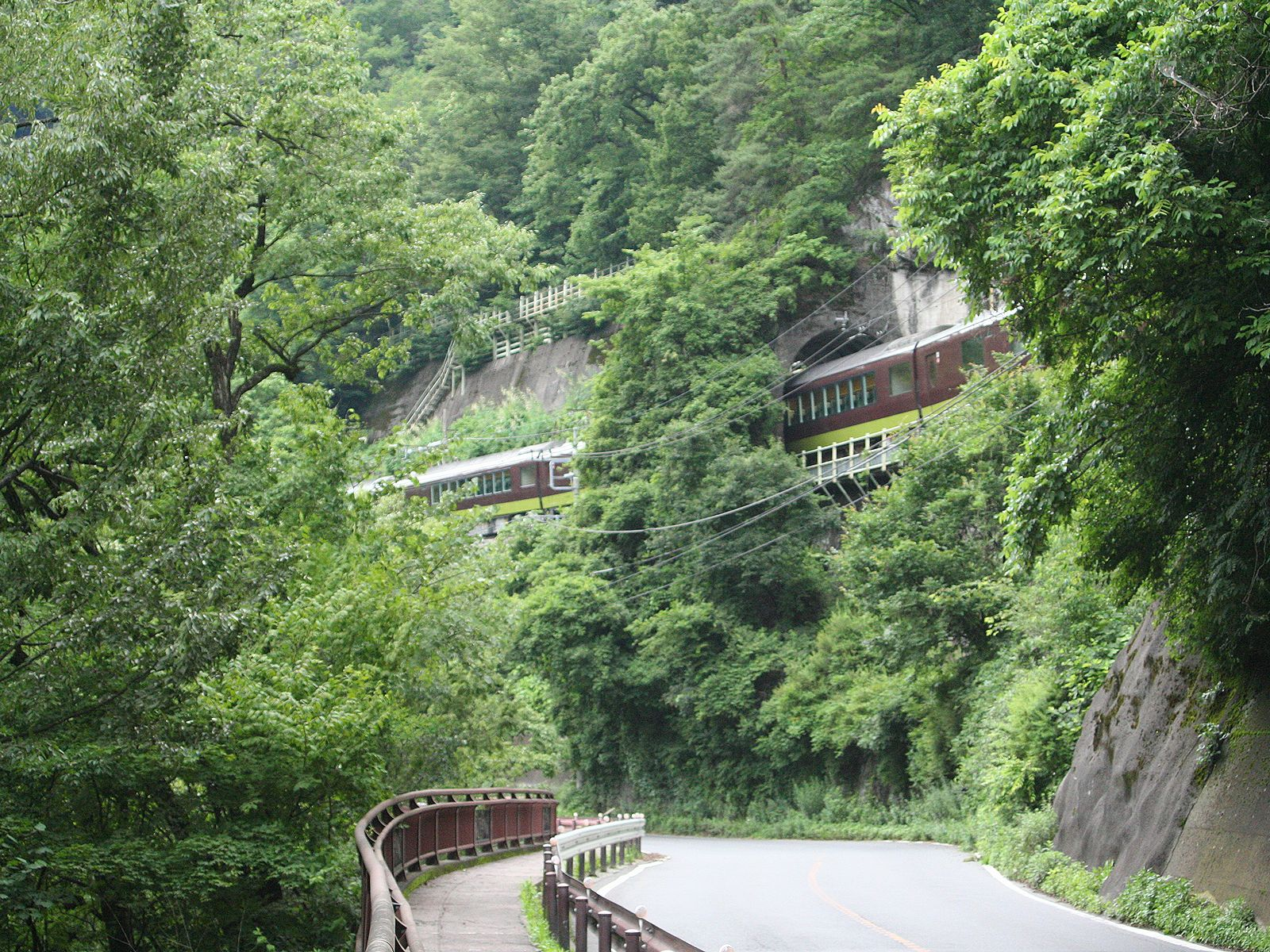
Tarusawa-Tunnel-Resort-Yamadori

Tarusawa Tunnel (樽沢トンネル) was the shortest railway tunnel in Japan, at 7.2 meters in length, until its abandonment in 2014. It was built in 1946, and was located on the Agatsuma Line in Gunma Prefecture at 36°33'50.2"N 138°43'21.2"E. The tunnel was abandoned after a nearby portion of the line was inundated by the construction of the Yamba Dam. It currently can be visited by riding the Agattan cycle rail carts.
