= 651 series =

Japanese train type

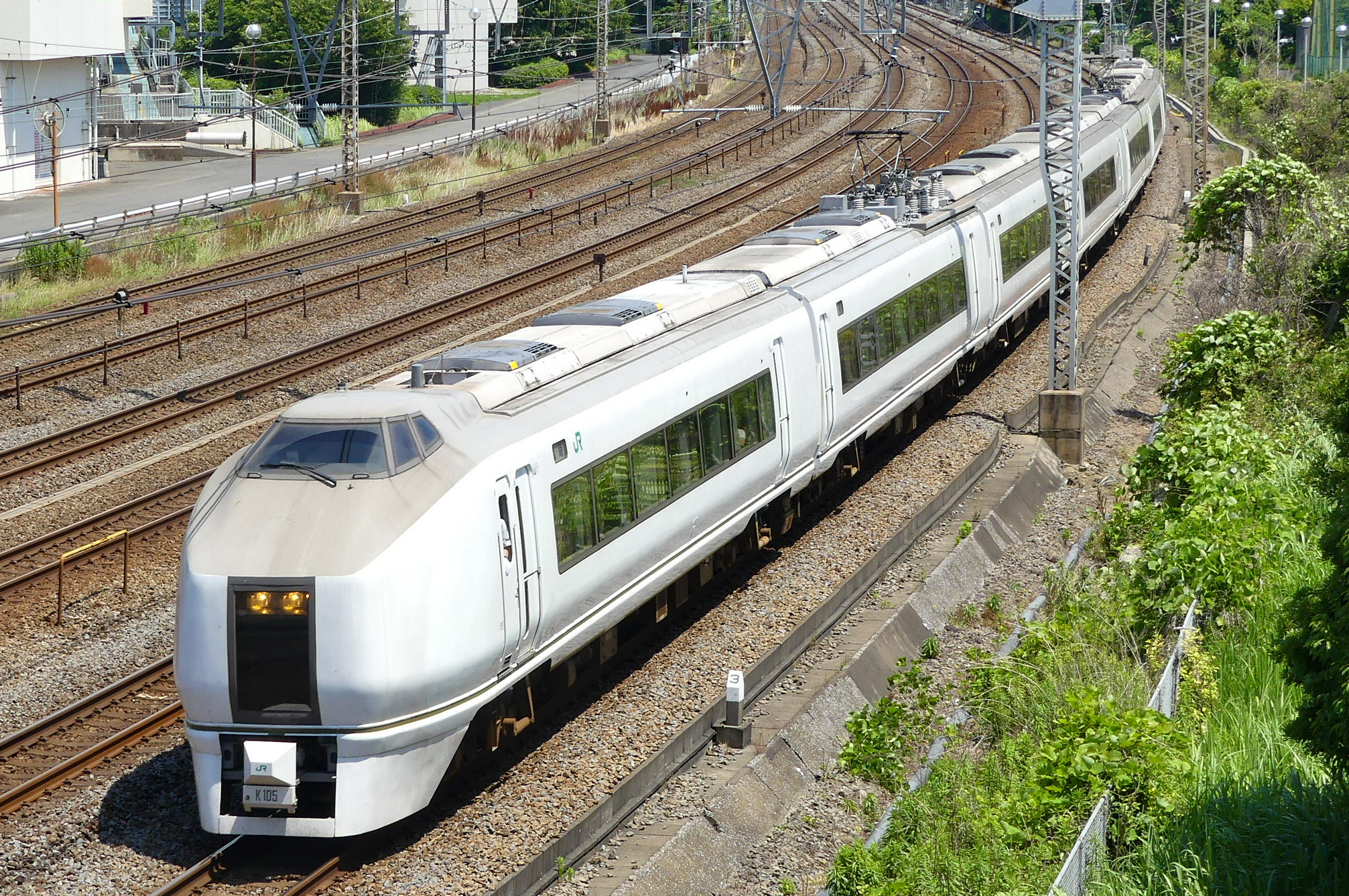
- A 651 series in June 2017
- In service: 1989–2023
- Manufacturer: Kawasaki Heavy Industries
- Built at: Hyogo
- Replaced: 485 series
- Constructed: 1988–1992
- Refurbished: October 2000 – December 2002
- Scrapped: 2013–2023
- Number built: 99 vehicles (18 sets)
- Number in service: None
- Number scrapped: 99 vehicles (18 sets)
- Successor: E657 series
- Formation: 4/7 cars per trainset
- Operator: JR East
- Depots: Katsuta; Omiya; Kōzu

Specifications
- Car body construction: Steel
- Car length: 21.5 m (70 ft 6 in) (end cars); 21.1 m (69 ft 3 in) (intermediate cars)
- Width: 2,900 mm (9 ft 6 in)
- Maximum speed: 130 km/h (80 mph)
- Traction system: Thyristor drive + Resistor control + field system superimposed field excitation control
- Acceleration: 1.95 km/(h⋅s) (1.21 mph/s)
- Deceleration: 5.2 km/(h⋅s) (3.2 mph/s)
- Electric system: 1,500 V DC / 20 kV AC (50 Hz) overhead catenary
- Current collection: Pantograph
- Bogies: DT56 (motor), T241 (trailer)
- Safety systems: ATS-P, ATS-Ps
- Track gauge: 1,067 mm (3 ft 6 in)

Notes/references
- This train won the 33rd Blue Ribbon Award in 1990.

The 651 series (651系) was an AC/DC dual-voltage electric multiple unit (EMU) type operated by East Japan Railway Company (JR East) in Japan between March 1989 and October 2023.

Trains originally operated as 7+4-car formations on Super Hitachi limited express services between Ueno in Tokyo and Sendai via the Jōban Line, but were withdrawn from regular scheduled services from the start of the revised timetable on 16 March 2013. The majority of the fleet was subsequently modified to become the 651-1000 series, and re-employed on Akagi and Kusatsu limited express services from March 2014.

== Variants ==
- 651-0 series: Original (nine 7-car and nine 4-car) AC/DC sets built from 1989
- 651-1000 series: 7-car and 4-car DC-only sets modified from 651-0 series
- Izu Craile: Rebuilt 4-car resort trainset entering service in July 2016

== Operations ==
The 651-1000 series sets were used on Akagi, Swallow Akagi, and Kusatsu limited express services.

Beginning in April 2019, a four-car 651-0 series set operated as a local service on a segment of Jōban Line between Iwaki and Tomioka, making 2 round trips a day.

== Formations ==
=== 651-0 series ===
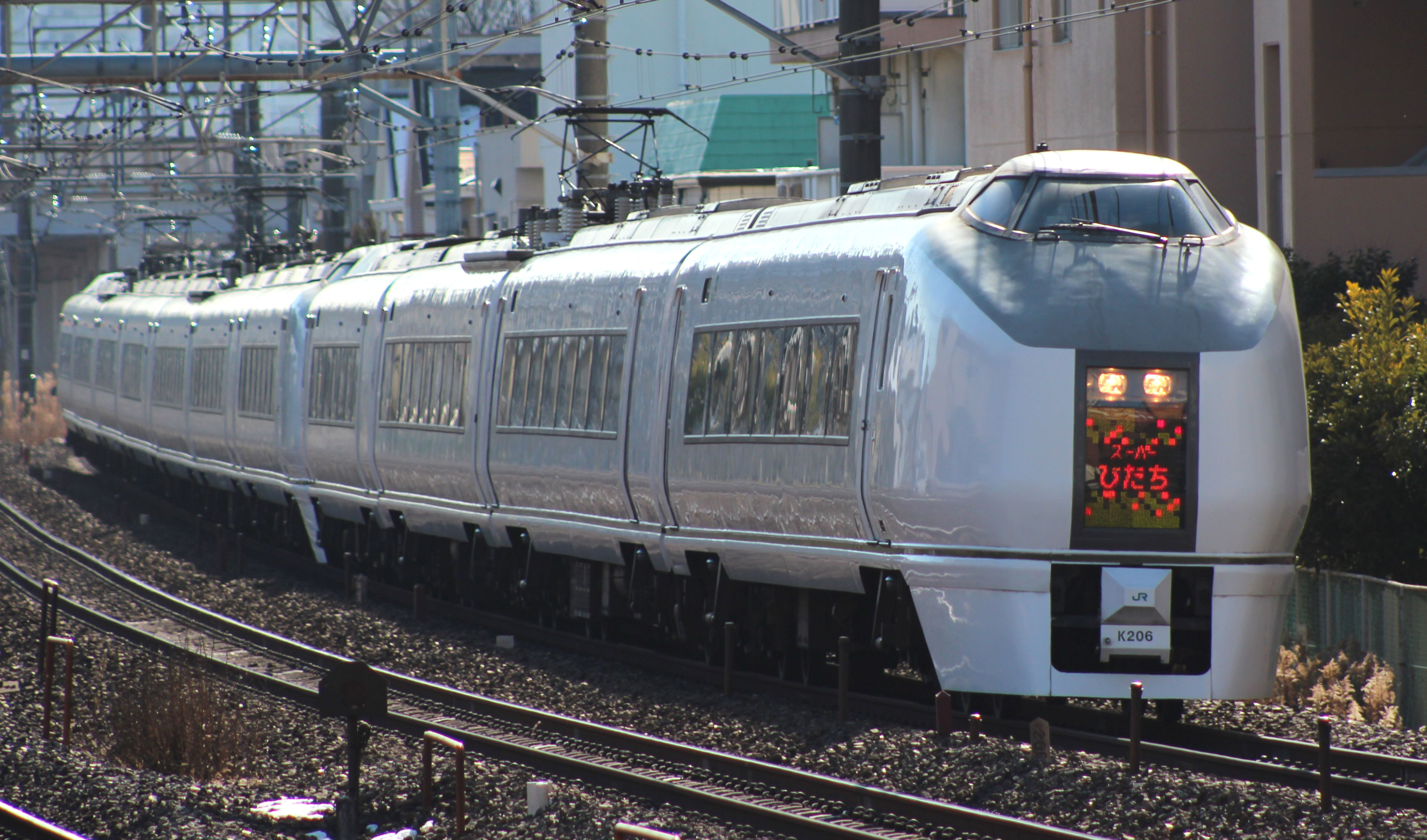
A 4+7-car formation on a Super Hitachi service in January 2013

==== 7-car sets ====
The seven-car sets, K101 to K109, were formed as follows, with four motored ("M") cars and three non-powered trailer ("T") cars, and car 1 at the Ueno (southern) end.

Car No.	1	2	3	4	5	6	7
Designation	Tc2	M'2	M2	Ts	M'1	M1	Tc1
Numbering	KuHa 650	MoHa 650-100	MoHa 651-100	SaRo 651	MoHa 650	MoHa 651	KuHa 651

- Cars 2 and 5 were each fitted with one PS26 lozenge-type pantograph.
- Cars 1, 3, 4, and 6 had toilets.

==== 4-car sets ====
The four-car sets, K201 to K209, were formed as follows, with two motored ("M") cars and two non-powered trailer ("T") cars, and car 8 at the Ueno (southern) end.

Car No.	8	9	10	11
Designation	Tc2	M'1	M1	Tc1
Numbering	KuHa 650	MoHa 650	MoHa 651	KuHa 651-100

- Car 9 was fitted with one PS26 lozenge-type pantograph.
- Cars 8 and 10 had toilets.

=== 651-1000 series ===
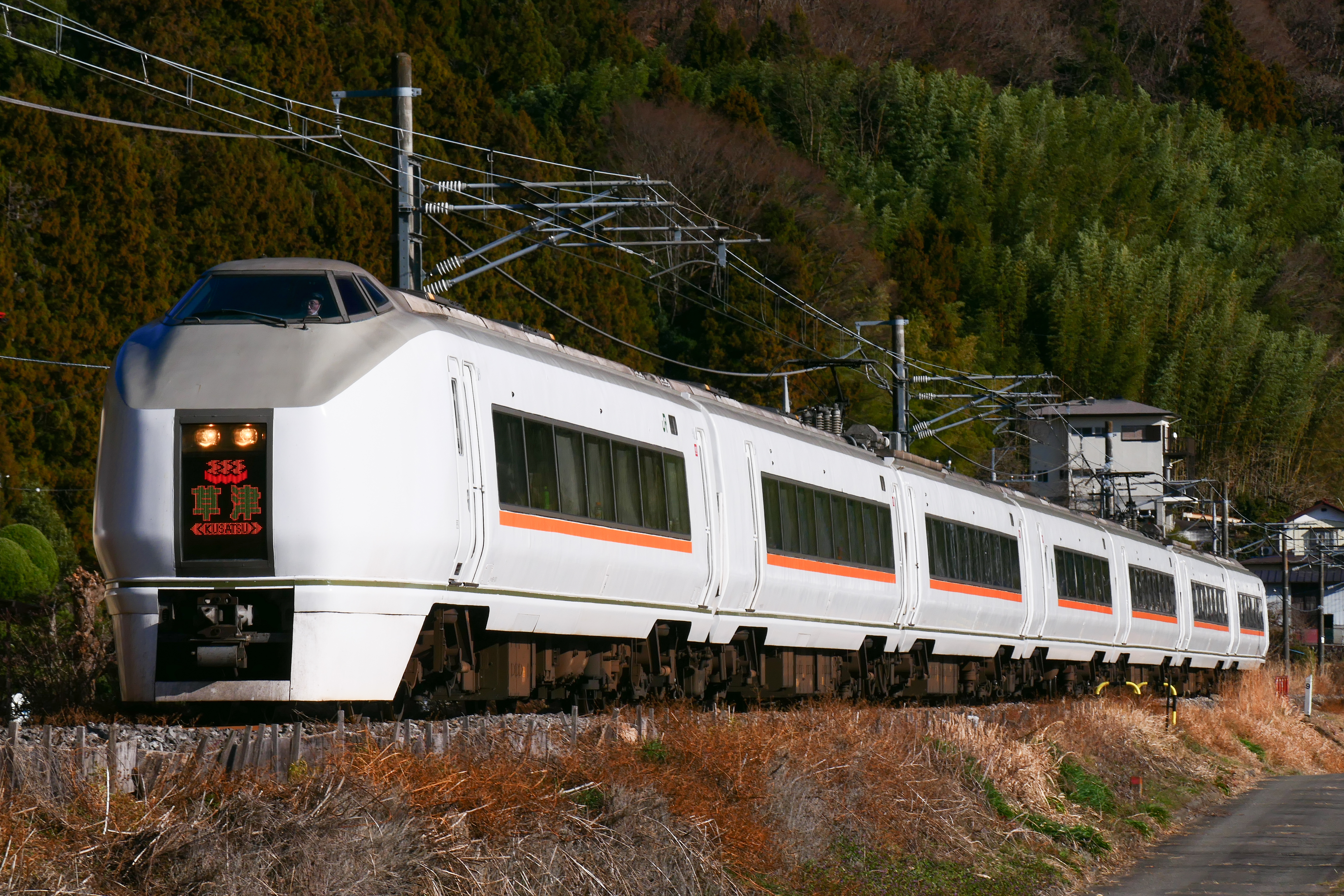
651-1000 series set OM201 on a Kusatsu service in December 2022

==== 7-car sets ====
The seven-car sets, OM201 to OM206, were formed as follows, with four motored ("M") cars and three non-powered trailer ("T") cars, and car 1 at the Ueno (southern) end.

Car No.	1	2	3	4	5	6	7
Designation	Tc2	M'2	M2	Ts	M'1	M1	Tc1
Numbering	KuHa 650-1000	MoHa 650-1100	MoHa 651-1100	SaRo 651-1000	MoHa 650-1000	MoHa 651-1000	KuHa 651-1000
Seating capacity	52	64	58	36	68	64	56

- Cars 2 and 5 were each fitted with one PS33D single-arm pantograph.
- Cars 1, 3, 4, and 6 had toilets.

==== 4-car sets ====
The four-car sets, OM301 to OM303, were formed as follows, with two motored ("M") cars and two non-powered trailer ("T") cars, and car 8 at the Ueno (southern) end.

Car No.	8	9	10	11
Designation	Tc2	M'1	M1	Tc
Numbering	KuHa 650-1000	MoHa 650-1000	MoHa 651-1000	KuHa 651-1100
Seating capacity	52	68	64	56

- Car 9 was fitted with one PS33D single-arm pantograph.
- Cars 8 and 10 had toilets.

=== Izu Craile 4-car set IR01 ===
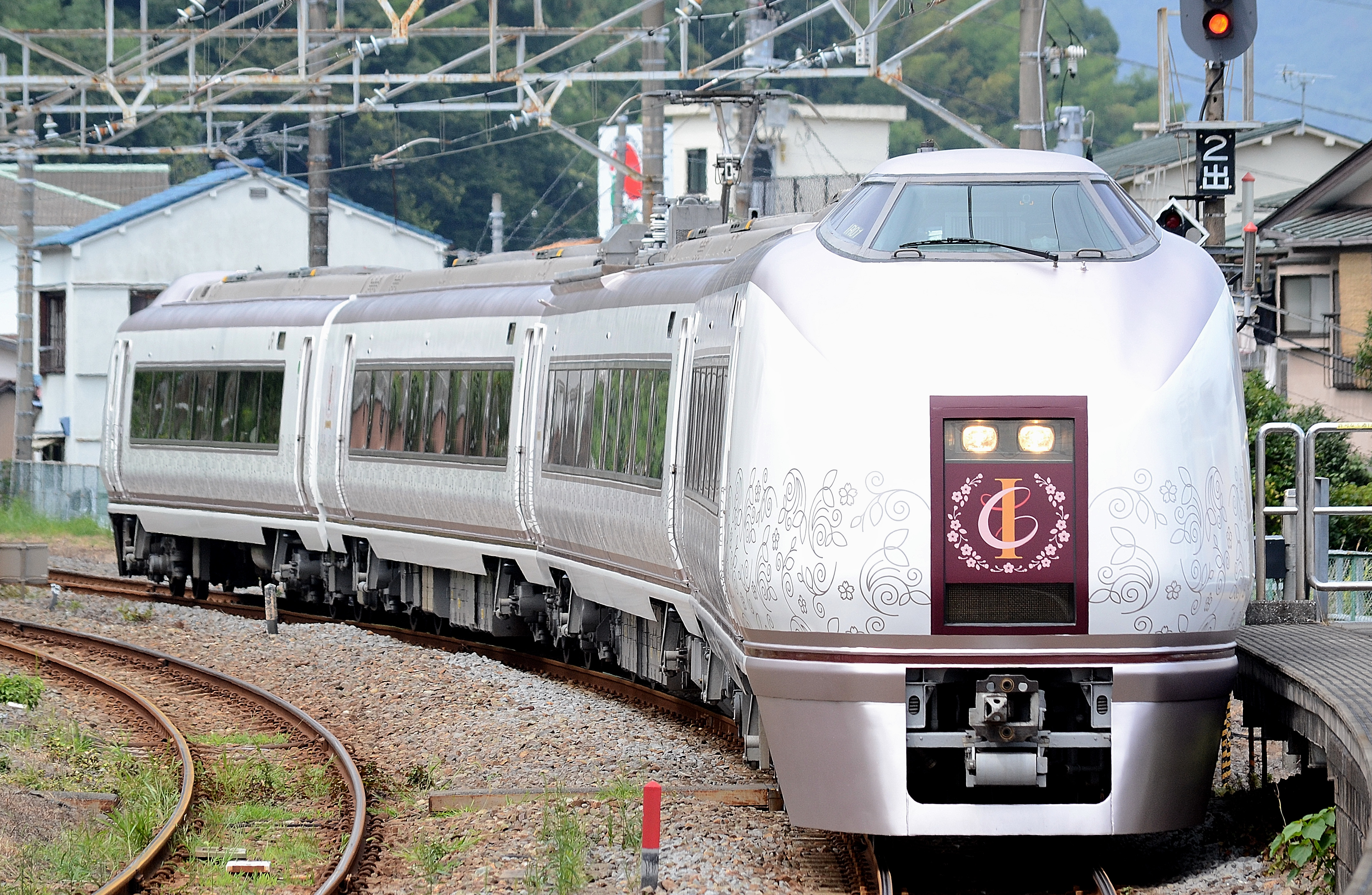
The Izu Craile set IR01 in August 2016

The converted four-car set IR01 (formerly OM301) was formed as follows, with two motored ("M") cars and two non-powered trailer ("T") cars, and car 1 at the southern end.

Car No.	1	2	3	4
Designation	Tsc2	M'1	Ms1	Tsc
Numbering	KuRo 650-1007	MoHa 650-1007	MoRo 651-1007	KuRo 651-1101
Former number	KuHa 650-1007	MoHa 650-1007	MoHa 651-1007	KuHa 651-1101
Weight (t)	36.3	41.1	37.8	31.1
Seating capacity	24	-	22	52

Car 2 was fitted with one PS33D single-arm pantograph.

== Interior ==
Internally, Green car (first class) accommodation was arranged 2+1 abreast with a seat pitch of 1,160 mm (46 in), and Standard class is arranged 2+2 abreast with a seat pitch of 970 mm (38 in).

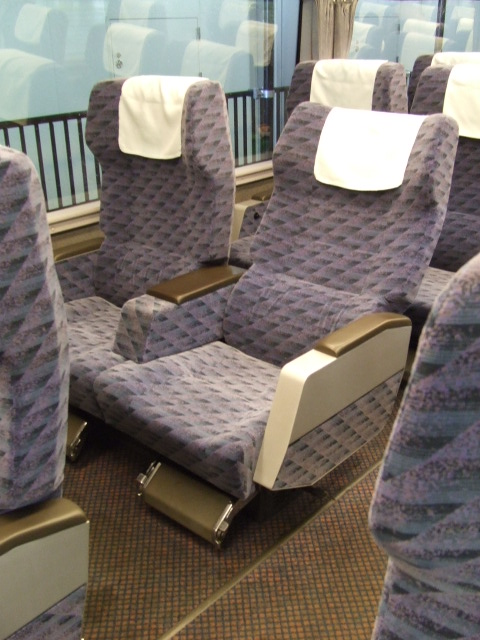
Green class seating

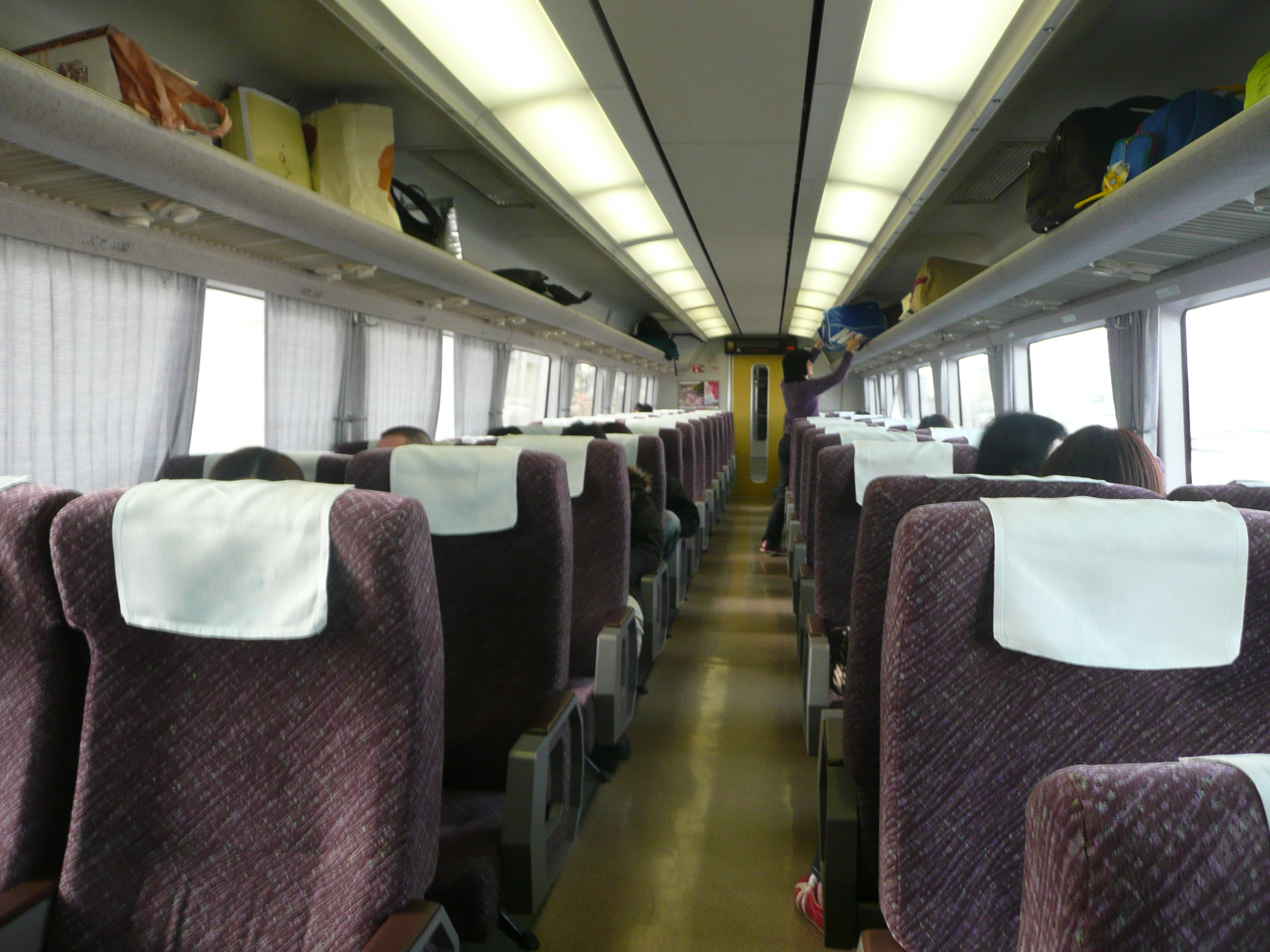
Interior view of standard class car

== History ==
The 651 series trains were introduced on new Super Hitachi limited services between Ueno and Sendai on 11 March 1989, and the trains received the 33rd Blue Ribbon Award presented annually in Japan since 1958 by the Japan Railfan Club.

From 2 December 2000, the Green car (car 4) was made entirely non-smoking, and the internal partitions were removed between December 2000 and January 2001. Three seats were added to the Green car in June 2004, increasing the seating capacity to 36. All cars became no-smoking from the start of the revised timetable on 18 March 2007. The refreshment vending machines were discontinued from 31 March 2008.

From the start of the revised timetable on 17 March 2012, six pairs of 651 series trains were removed from service and put into storage, replaced by new 10-car E657 series EMUs on Super Hitachi services. The entire fleet was replaced by the start of the revised timetable on 16 March 2013, but the sets were however retained for seasonal and additional workings.

From 1 October 2013, one 11-car 651 series formation was brought back into service for use on two Fresh Hitachi services daily while the E657 series fleet undergoes modification work to add LED seat reservation status indicators above each seat. This continued until March 2015.

=== 651-1000 series conversions ===
Between late 2013 and early 2014, a number of 651 series sets were modified and renumbered 651-1000 series for use on Akagi and Kusatsu limited express services from the start of the revised timetable on 15 March 2014, replacing ageing 185 series EMUs. In 2018, seven-car set K102 also underwent this conversion. The modifications included disconnecting (but not removing) the original AC electrical equipment, replacing the original PS26 lozenge-type pantographs with the same PS33D single-arm pantographs used on E233 series suburban EMUs, and adding an orange bodyside stripe below the windows. No changes were made to the interiors.

=== Izu Craile resort train ===
Four-car set OM301 was rebuilt as a resort train set named Izu Craile (伊豆クレイル) between November 2015 and April 2016, and entered service on the Ito Line and a section of the Tokaido Line between Odawara and Atami from 16 July 2016. The name is a portmanteau formed from "Cresciuto" (Italian for "mature"), "train", and the suffix "-ile". Car 1 has window-facing counter seats on the seaward side, car 2 has a bar counter and lounge, car 3 has semi-open compartments, and car 4 has conventional unidirectional 2+2-abreast seating. based at Kōzu Depot. On 30 January 2020, with the introduction of the E261 series on Saphir Odoriko services, JR East announced that the Izu Craile service would no longer be necessary, and that it would be retired. The train had its last run on 28 June 2020, and was subsequently transported to Nagano General Rolling Stock Centre for scrap in October 2020.

=== Retirement ===
From the start of the revised timetable on 18 March 2023, the 651 series sets were withdrawn from Kusatsu, Swallow Akagi, and Akagi services, hence marking the end of regular service by the 651 series.

The last surviving trainset, OM201, was sent for scrap in October 2023.

== Fleet details ==
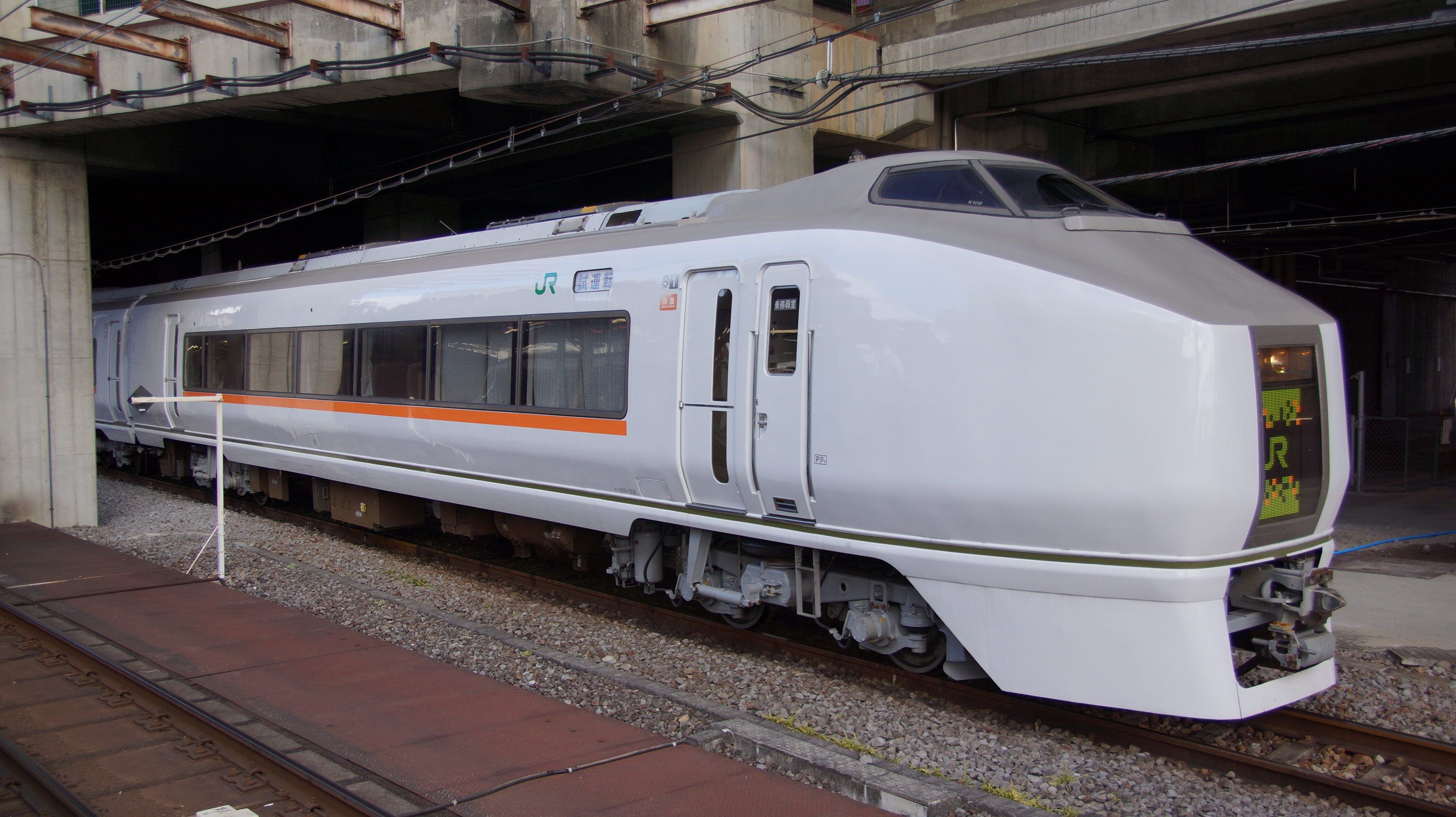
Converted 651-1000 series set K109 (later OM206) on a driver-training run, January 2014

The delivery, refurbishment, and conversion dates for the fleet are as shown below. All sets were originally built by Kawasaki Heavy Industries in Hyogo.

=== 7-car sets ===
Set	Delivered	Refurbished	Renumbered	Date modified	Location modified	Withdrawn
K101	20 December 1988	2 October 2001	OM201	12 March 2014	Koriyama	26 October 2023
K102	11 January 1989	3 August 2001	OM207	May 2018	Koriyama	27 September 2023
K103	6 February 1989	23 July 2002				
K104	15 February 1989	22 November 2000	OM202	5 March 2014	Omiya	15 April 2022
K105	28 February 1989	16 February 2001				
K106	28 December 1989	18 June 2002	OM203	24 January 2014	Koriyama	23 March 2023
K107	19 February 1990	14 February 2002	OM204	14 November 2013	Koriyama	26 April 2023
K108	3 March 1990	4 October 2000	OM205	6 December 2013	Koriyama	16 June 2023
K109	26 January 1992	21 November 2001	OM206	7 October 2013	Koriyama	26 July 2023

=== 4-car sets ===
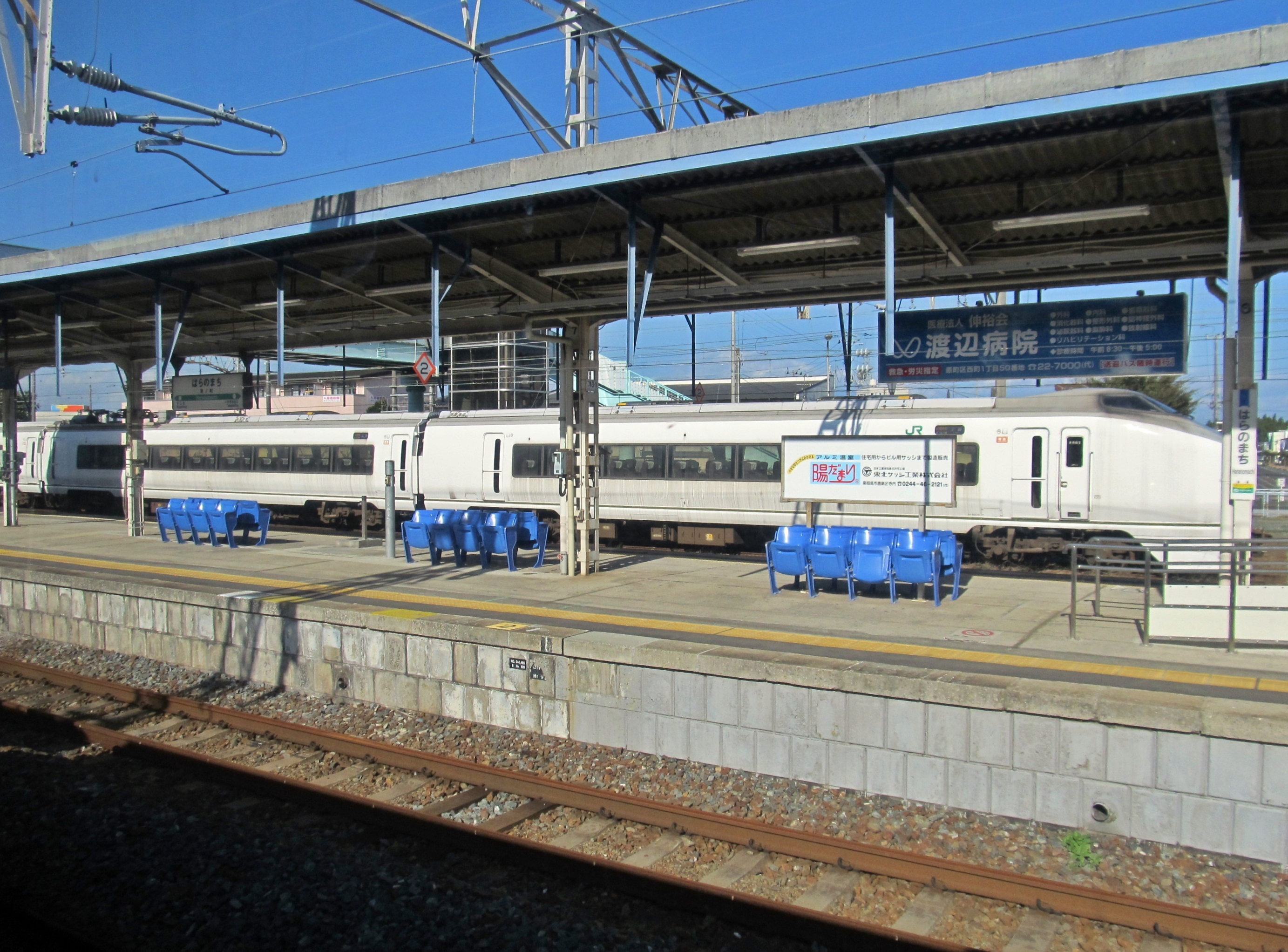
Four-car set K202 dumped next to Haranomachi Station since the March 2011 earthquake and tsunami

Set	Delivered	Refurbished	Renumbered	Date modified	Location modified	Withdrawn
K201	6 February 1989	13 June 2001				
K202	15 February 1989	3 March 2001				
K203	28 February 1989	27 September 2002				11 September 2013
K204	28 December 1989	20 March 2002				
K205	1 February 1990	28 October 2002				
K206	1 February 1990	24 October 2001	OM301	21 February 2014	Koriyama	
K206	1 February 1990	24 October 2001	IR01	April 2016	Omiya	8 October 2020
K207	19 February 1990	28 November 2002				
K208	3 March 1990	13 December 2001	OM302	3 April 2014	Koriyama	
K209	26 January 1992	26 December 2002	OM303	5 March 2014	Koriyama	
