= Kusatsu (train) =

Japanese limited express train service

Kusatsu/Shima
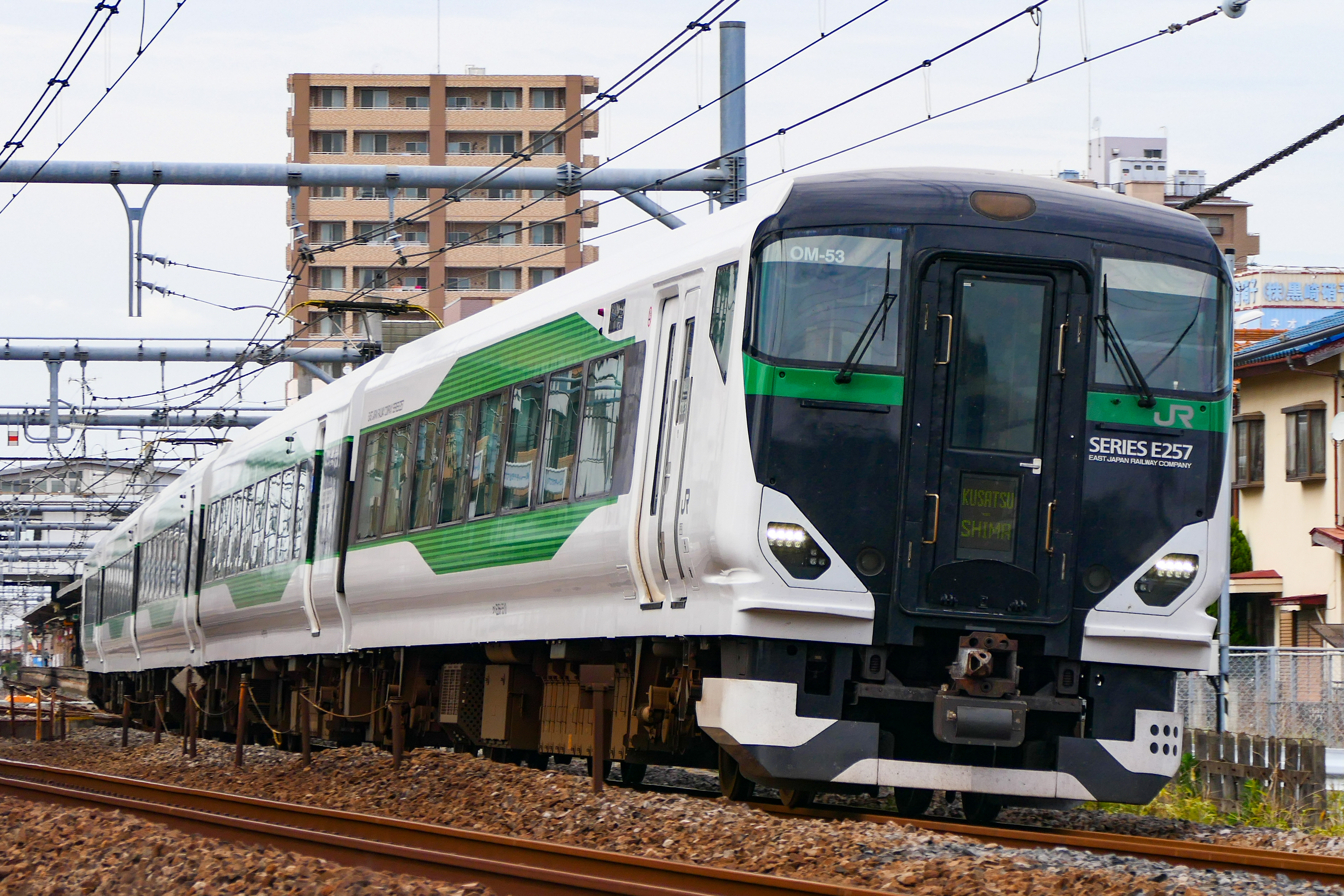
- A E257 series EMU on a Kusatsu/Shima service, May 2023

Overview
- Service type: Limited express
- Status: Operational
- First service: 1 June 1960 (Semi express); 14 March 1985 (Limited express)
- Current operator: JR East
- Former operator: JNR

Route
- Termini: Ueno; Naganohara-Kusatsuguchi
- Lines used: Tohoku Main Line, Takasaki Line, Joetsu Line, Agatsuma Line

On-board services
- Classes: Standard; Previously: Standard + Green

Technical
- Rolling stock: E257 series 5-car EMUs
- Track gauge: 1,067 mm (3 ft 6 in)
- Electrification: 1,500 V DC overhead
- Operating speed: 110 km/h (70 mph)

The Kusatsu/Shima (草津・四万) is a limited express train service in Japan operated by East Japan Railway Company (JR East), which runs between Ueno in Tokyo and Naganohara-Kusatsuguchi. The train requires a reservation to board. The train used to run until Manza-Kazawaguchi.

== Rolling stock ==
Since the start of the revised timetable on 18 March 2023, Kusatsu/Shima services are operated by E257-5500 series EMUs, replacing the earlier 651-1000 series EMUs, which in turn replaced the previous 185 series trains.

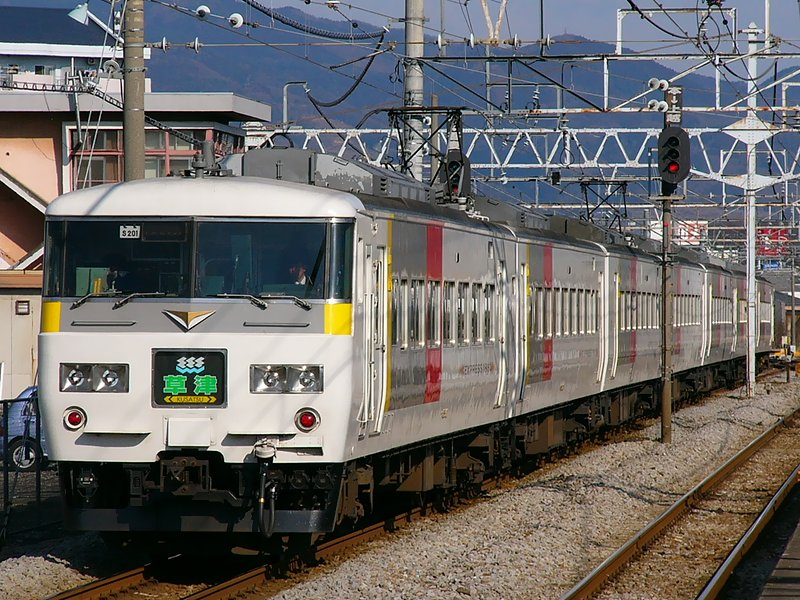
185 series Kusatsu, January 2003

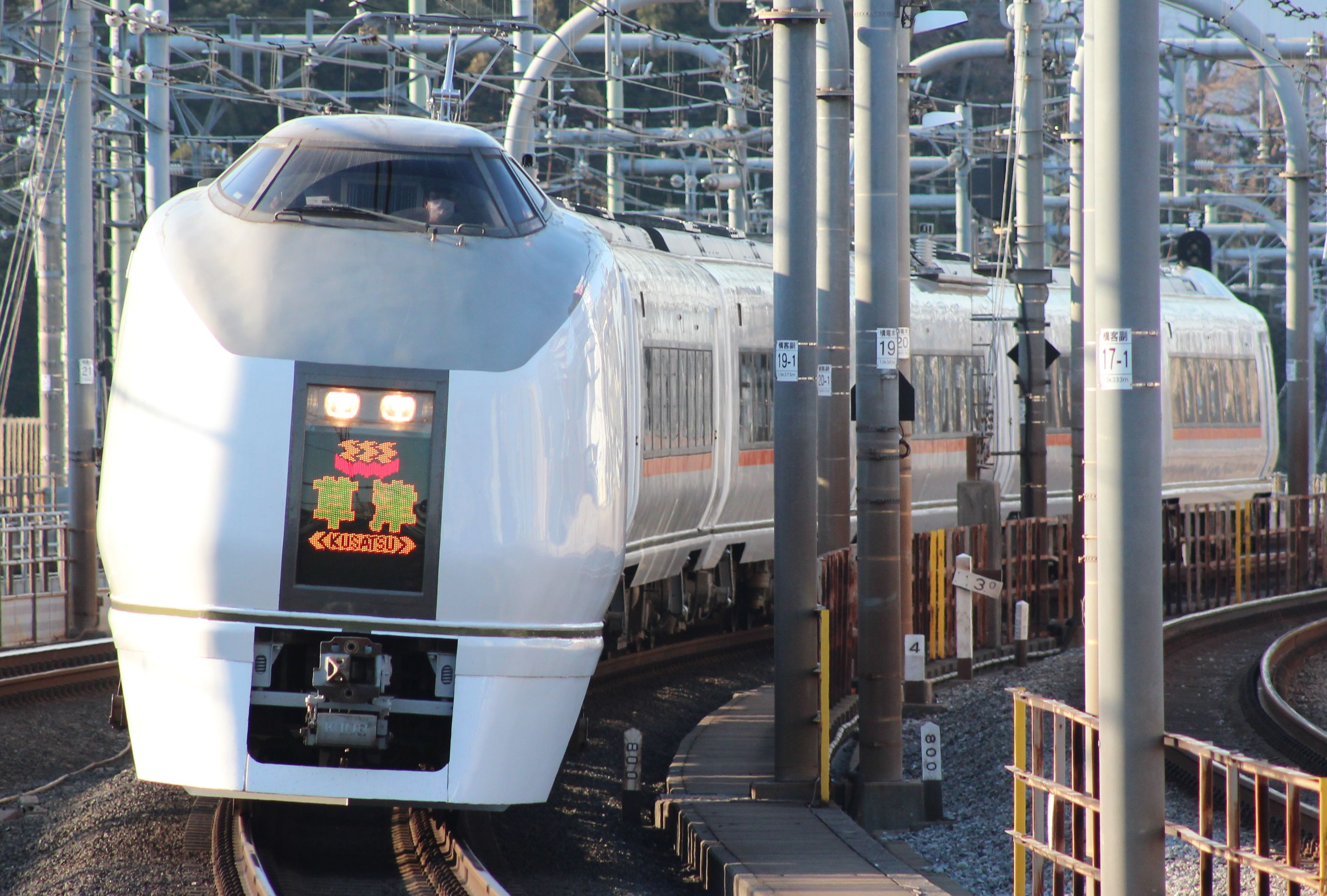
651-1000 series set K108, March 2014

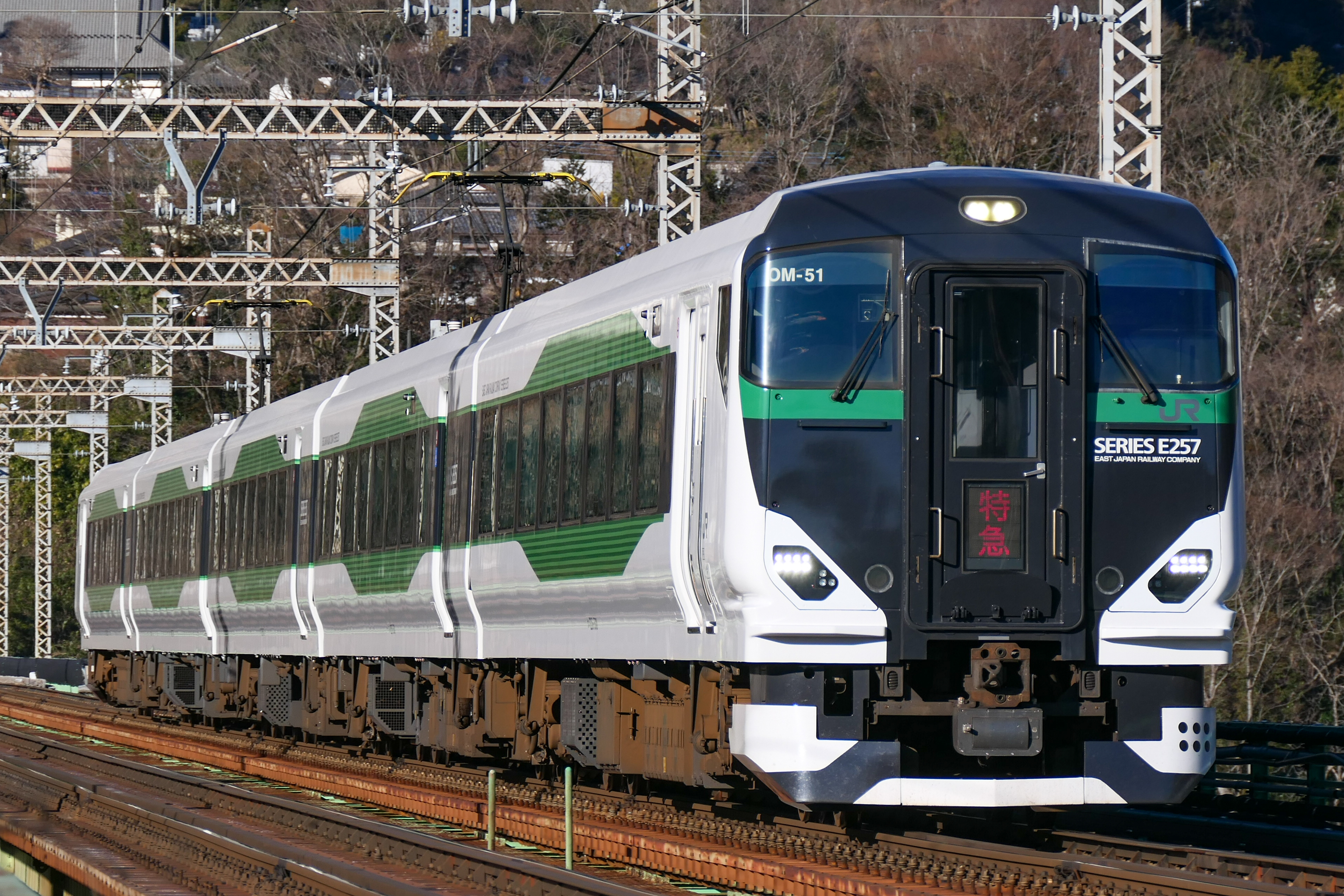
E257-5500 series, January 2022

== History ==
The Kusatsu service began on 1 June 1960 as a semi-express between Ueno and Naganohara (now Naganohara-Kusatsuguchi). This was upgraded to become a limited express service from 14 March 1985. From the start of the revised timetable on 15 March 2014, the 185 series EMUs used on these services were replaced by 651 series EMUs displaced from Super Hitachi services on the Joban Line, and modified to become the 651-1000 series.

== Kusatsu 50th anniversary ==
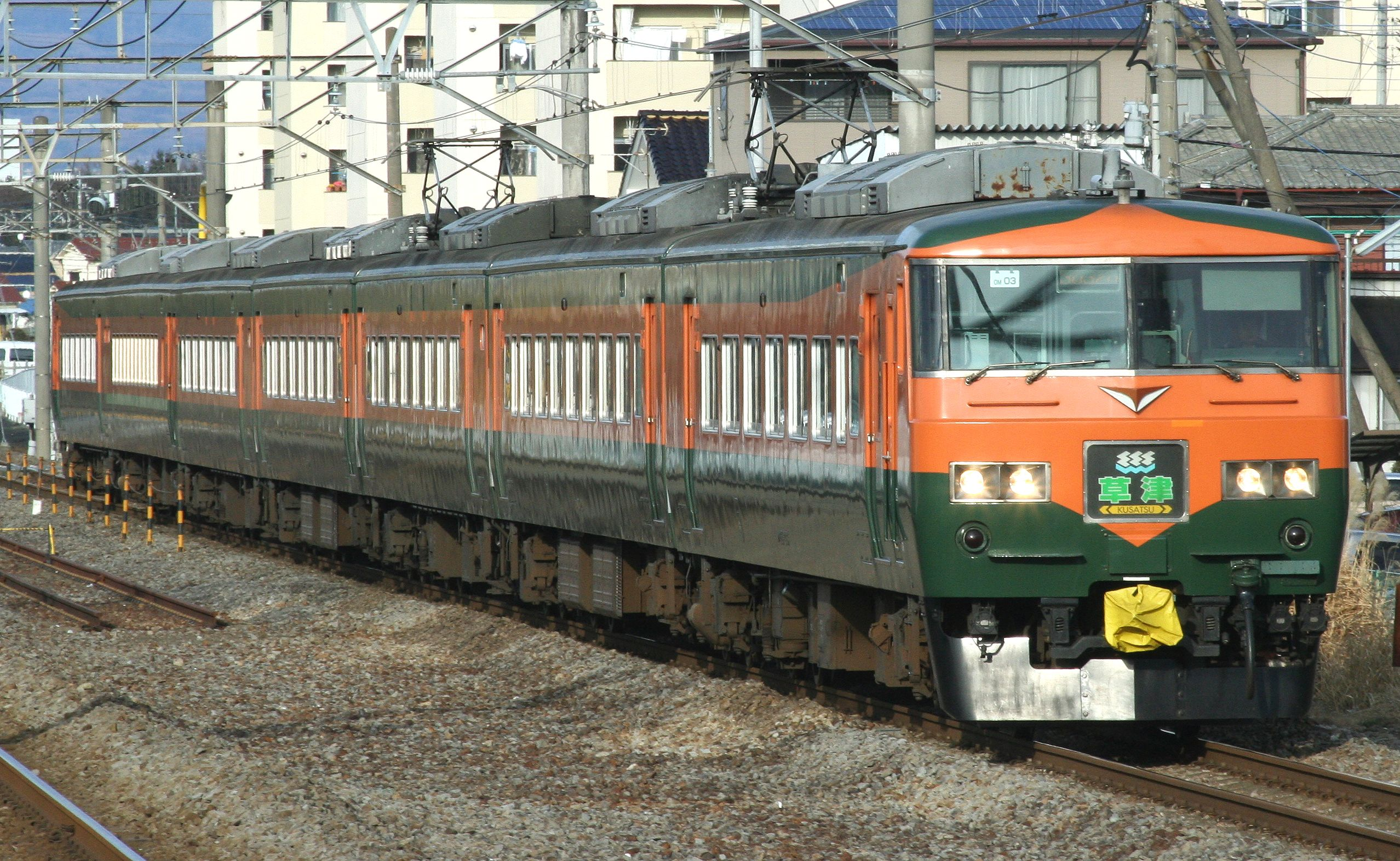
Repainted set OM03 on a Kusatsu service, January 2012

In September 2010, 185-200 series 7-car EMU set OM03 was repainted into the Shōnan colour scheme of orange and green (never previously carried by this type) to recreate the appearance of the early 80 series EMUs, as part of the 50th anniversary celebrations of the Kusatsu limited express service scheduled for October of that year.
