= Manza-Kazawaguchi Station =

Railway station in Tsumagoi, Gunma Prefecture, Japan

Manza-Kazawaguchi Station 万座・鹿沢口駅
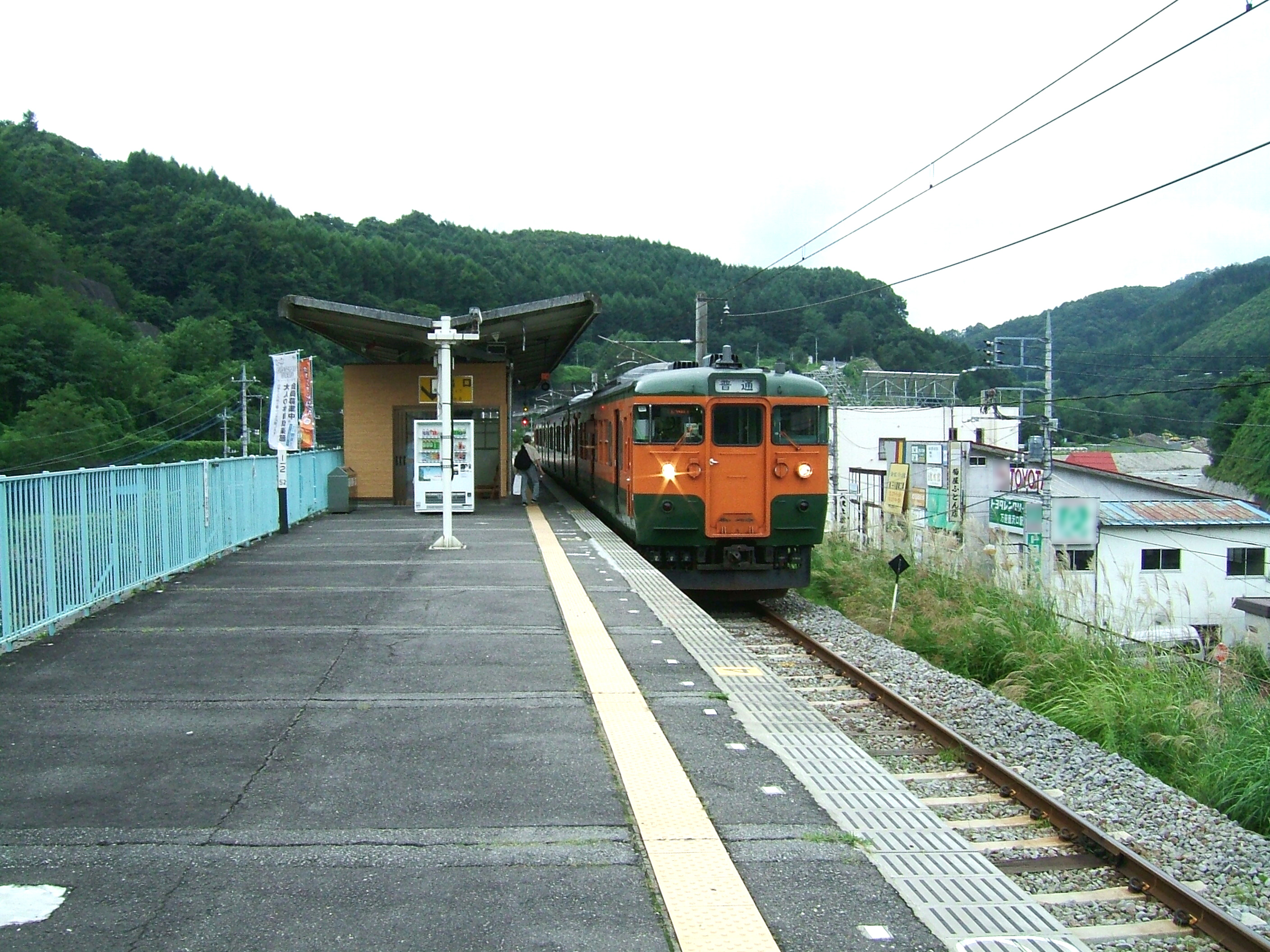
- Manza-Kazawaguchi Station

General information
- Location: Kanbara, Tsumagoi-muraAgatsuma-gun, Gunma-ken 377-1524; Japan
- Coordinates: 36°31′55″N 138°33′05″E
- Operator: JR East
- Line: ■ Agatsuma Line
- Distance: 52.3 km from Shibukawa
- Platforms: 1 side platform

Other information
- Status: Unstaffed
- Website: Official website

History
- Opened: March 7, 1971

Passengers
- FY2015: 205

Services
Preceding station	JR East	Following station
Ōmae Terminus	Agatsuma Line	Fukurogura towards Takasaki
Location
- Location within Gunma Prefecture Location within Japan

Manza-Kazawaguchi Station (万座・鹿沢口駅, Manza-Kazawaguchi-eki) is a railway station in the village of Tsumagoi, Gunma, Japan, operated by the East Japan Railway Company (JR East).

== Lines ==
Manza-Kazawaguchi Station is served by the Agatsuma Line and is located 52.3 rail kilometers from the terminus of the line at Shibukawa Station.

== Station layout ==
The station consists of a single elevated side platform. The station is unattended.

== History ==
The station opened on March 7, 1971. The station was absorbed into the JR East network upon the privatization of the Japanese National Railways (JNR) on 1 April 1987.

== Passenger statistics ==
In fiscal 2015, the station was used by an average of 205 passengers daily (boarding passengers only).

== Surrounding area ==
- National Route 144
- Manza Onsen

== See also ==
- List of railway stations in Japan
