= Ōmae Station =

Railway station in Tsumagoi, Gunma Prefecture, Japan

Ōmae Station 大前駅
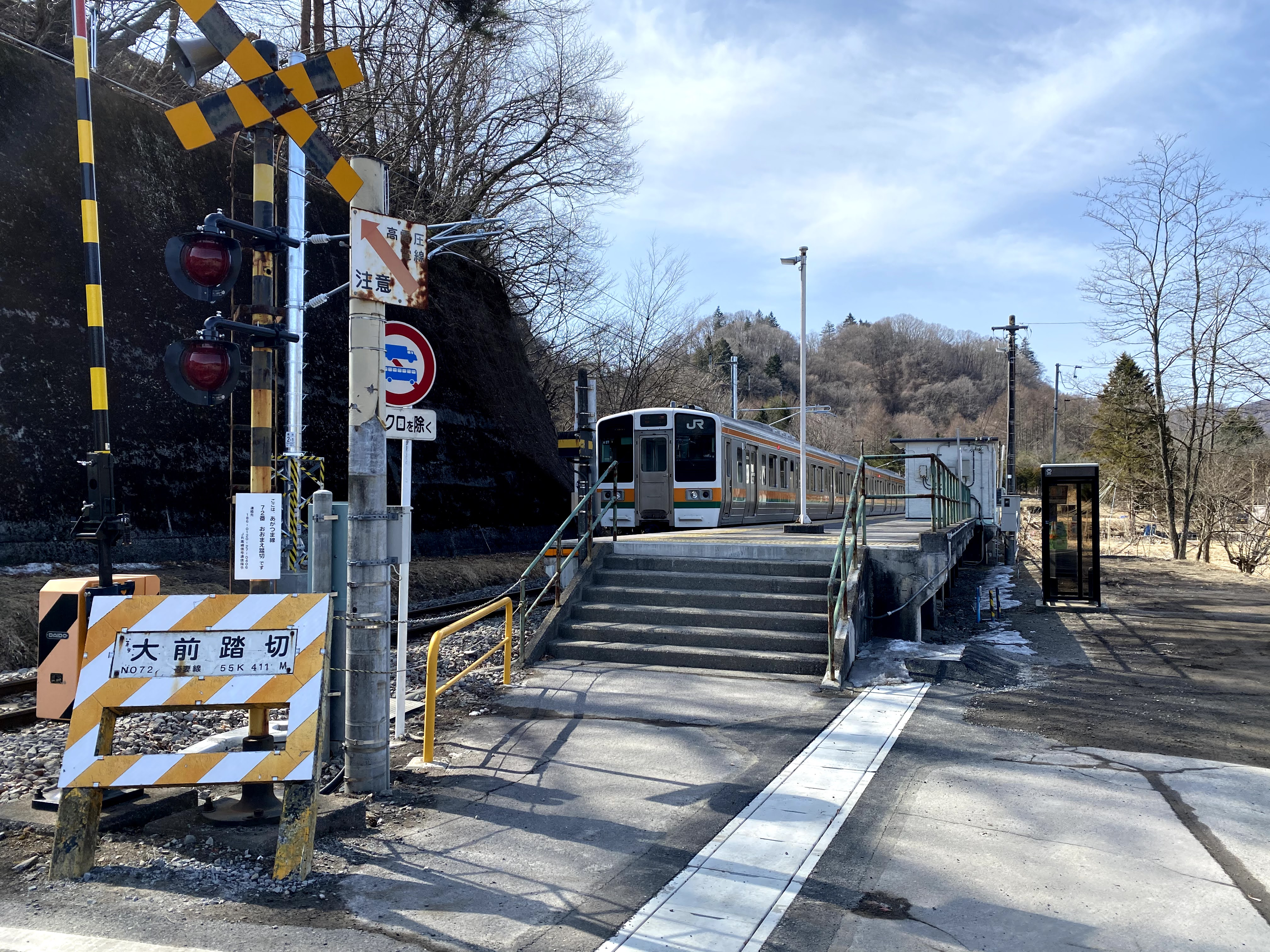
- Station Entrance, March 2021

General information
- Location: Ōmae, Tsumagoi-mura, Agatsuma-gun, Gunma-ken 377-1612; Japan
- Coordinates: 36°30′49″N 138°31′45″E
- Elevation: 840.4 m (2,757 ft)
- Operator: JR East
- Line: ■ Agatsuma Line
- Distance: 55.3 km from Shibukawa
- Platforms: 1 side platform

Other information
- Status: Unstaffed
- Website: Official website

History
- Opened: 7 March 1971

Passengers
- FY2011: 100

Services
Preceding station	JR East	Following station
Terminus	Agatsuma Line	Manza-Kazawaguchi towards Takasaki
Location
- Location within Gunma Prefecture Location within Japan

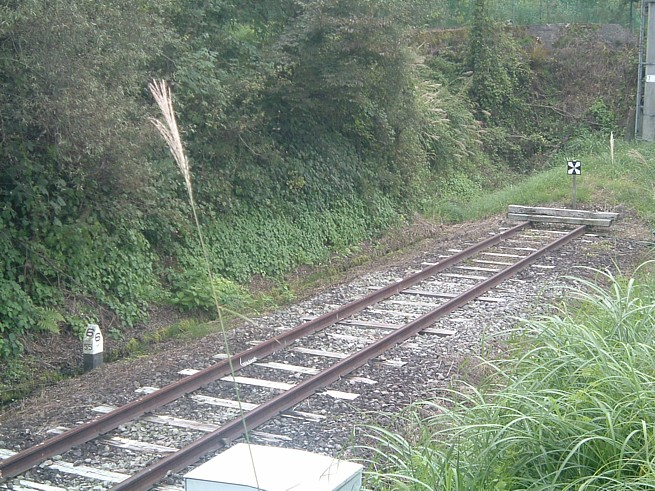
55.6 kilometer sign marking the end of Agatsuma Line

Ōmae Station (大前駅, Ōmae-eki) is a passenger railway station in the village of Tsumagoi, Gunma Prefecture, Japan, operated by East Japan Railway Company (JR East). This station is 840.4 meters AMSL.

== Lines ==
Ōmae Station is a terminal station of the Agatsuma Line, and is located 55.3 rail kilometers from the opposing terminus of the line at Shibukawa Station.

== Station layout ==
The station consists of a single dead-headed side platform. The station is unattended.

== History ==
Ōmae Station was opened on 7 March 1971. The station was absorbed into the JR East network upon the privatization of the Japanese National Railways (JNR) on 1 April 1987.

== Surrounding area ==
- Tsumagoi Onsen
- Agatsuma River
- National Route 144
- National Route 406

== See also ==
- List of railway stations in Japan
