= Agatsuma =

Agatsuma may refer to:

- Hiromitsu Agatsuma (上妻 宏光; born 1973), Japanese shamisen player
- Haruka Agatsuma (我妻 悠香; born 1994), Japanese softball player
- Agatsuma District, Gunma, a district in Gunma Prefecture, Japan
- Agatsuma, Gunma, a town in Gunma Prefecture, Japan
- Agatsuma River, a river in Japan
- Agatsuma Entertainment, a Japanese toy/video game company
- Zenitsu Agatsuma, a character from the manga/anime series Demon Slayer: Kimetsu no Yaiba
