= Kuni, Gunma =

Dissolved municipality in Gunma prefecture, Japan

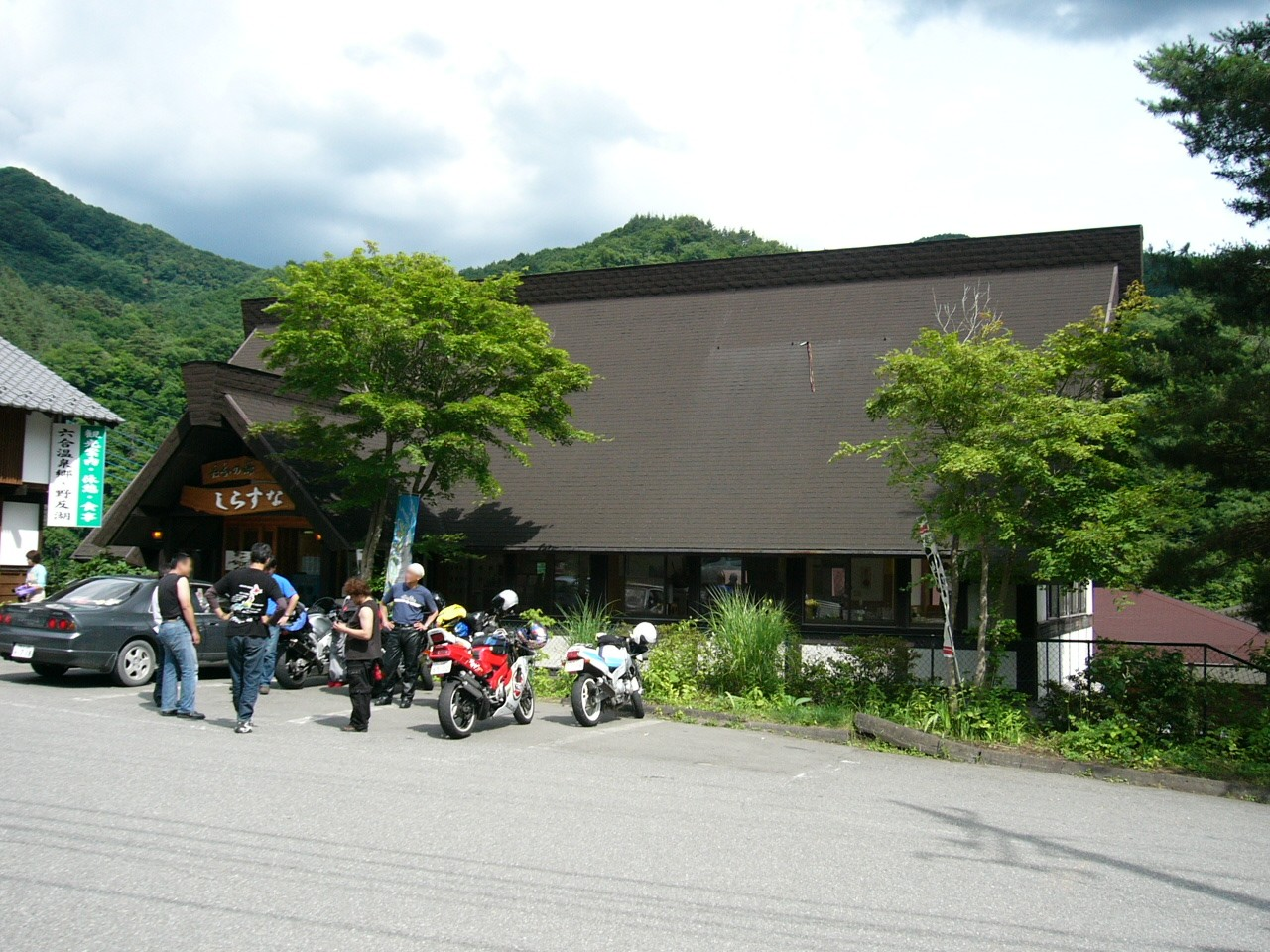
Roadside Station Kuni

Flag

Chapter seal/emblem

Kuni (六合村, Kuni-mura) was a village located in Agatsuma District, Gunma Prefecture, Japan.

As of September 1, 2007, the village had an estimated population of 1,788 and a population density of 9.41 persons per km². The total area was 202.81 km².

On March 28, 2010, Kuni was merged into the expanded town of Nakanojō.

== Geography ==
Over half of the total area is covered by forests. Located on the border of Gunma Prefecture and Nagano Prefecture is Lake Nozori. There were two major hot springs in the village: the Shiriyaki and Hanashiki Hot Springs.

== Surrounding municipalities ==
- Gunma Prefecture
  - Kusatsu
  - Nakanojō
  - Naganohara
  - Higashiagatsuma
- Nagano Prefecture
  - Sakae
  - Yamanouchi
  - Takayama
- Niigata Prefecture
  - Yuzawa

== History ==
- 1889 - Kusatsu village is created in Agatsuma District.
- 1900 - Kusatsu village is divided into Kusatsu town and Kuni village
- March 28, 2010 - Kuni was merged into the expanded town of Nakanojō.

== Name origin ==
Before the creation of Kusatsu village in 1889, there were six villages, called Akaiwa, Kosame, Hikage, Ooshi, Iriyama, and Irusu. When thinking of a name in 1900, Kuni, meaning six put together (六合), was chosen since there were six villages. The pronunciation of the village's name came from the Nihon Shoki.
