= Fukurogura Station =

Railway station in Tsumagoi, Gunma Prefecture, Japan

Fukurogura Station 袋倉駅
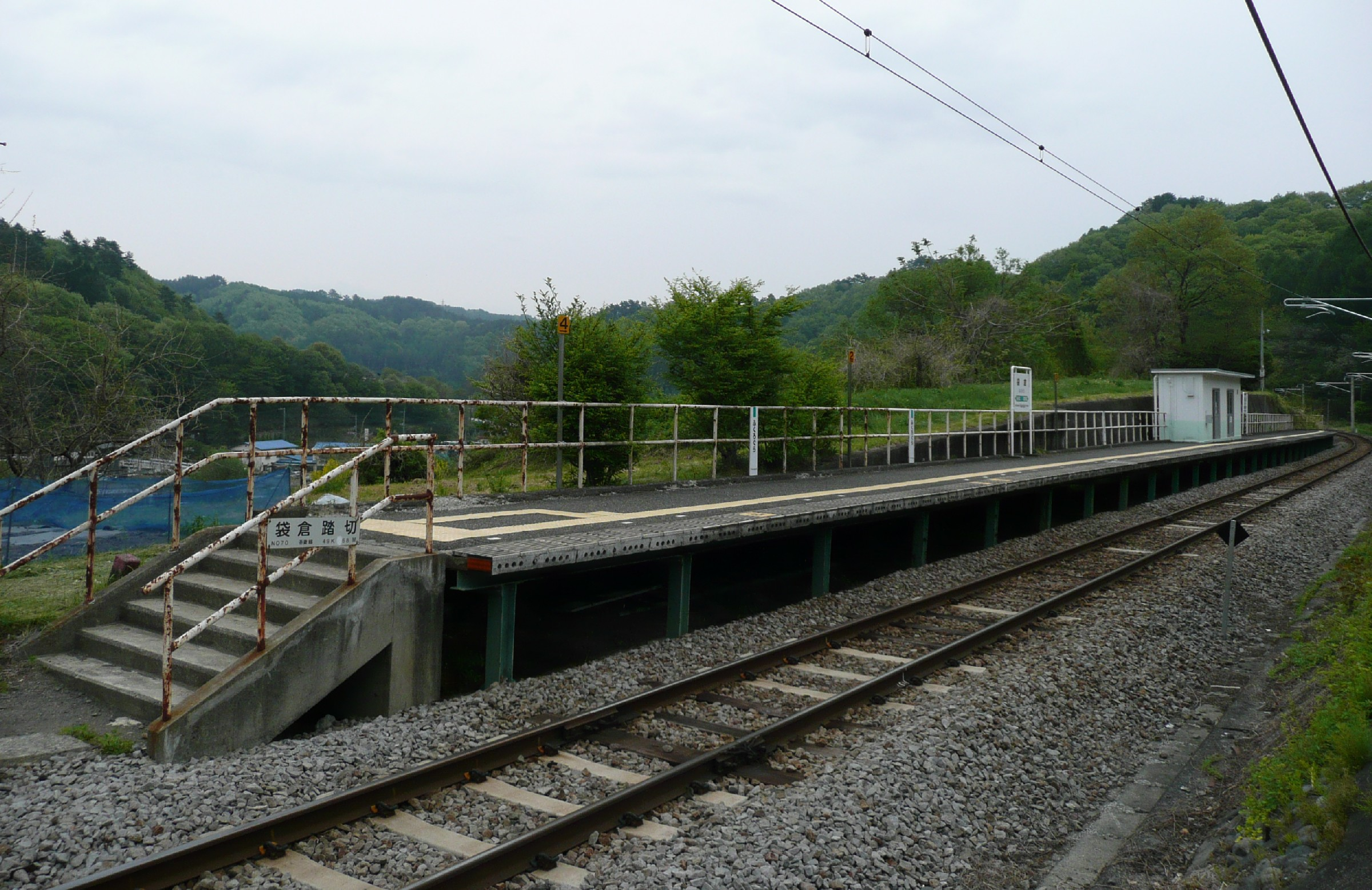
- Fukurogura Station in May 2009

General information
- Location: Fukurogura, Tsumagoi-mura, Agatsuma-gun, Gunma-ken 377-1522; Japan
- Coordinates: 36.5442°N 138.5793°E
- Operator: JR East
- Line: ■ Agatsuma Line
- Distance: 49.3 km from Shibukawa
- Platforms: 1 side platform

Other information
- Status: Unstaffed
- Website: Official website

History
- Opened: 7 March 1971

Passengers
- FY2011: 19

Services
Preceding station	JR East	Following station
Manza-Kazawaguchi towards Ōmae	Agatsuma Line	Haneo towards Takasaki
Location
- Location within Gunma Prefecture Location within Japan

Fukurogura Station (袋倉駅, Fukurogura-eki) is a passenger railway station in the village of Tsumagoi, Gunma Prefecture, Japan, operated by East Japan Railway Company (JR East).

== Lines ==
Fukurogura Station is a station on the Agatsuma Line, and is located 49.3 rail kilometers from the opposing terminus of the line at Shibukawa Station.

== Station layout ==
The station consists of a single side platform serving traffic in both directions. There are no station buildings and station is unattended.

== History ==
Fukurogura Station was opened on 7 March 1971. The station was absorbed into the JR East network upon the privatization of the Japanese National Railways (JNR) on 1 April 1987.

== Surrounding area ==
- Handeki Onsen
- Agatsuma River

== See also ==
- List of railway stations in Japan
