= Haneo Station =

Railway station in Naganohara, Gunma Prefecture, Japan

Haneo Station 羽根尾駅
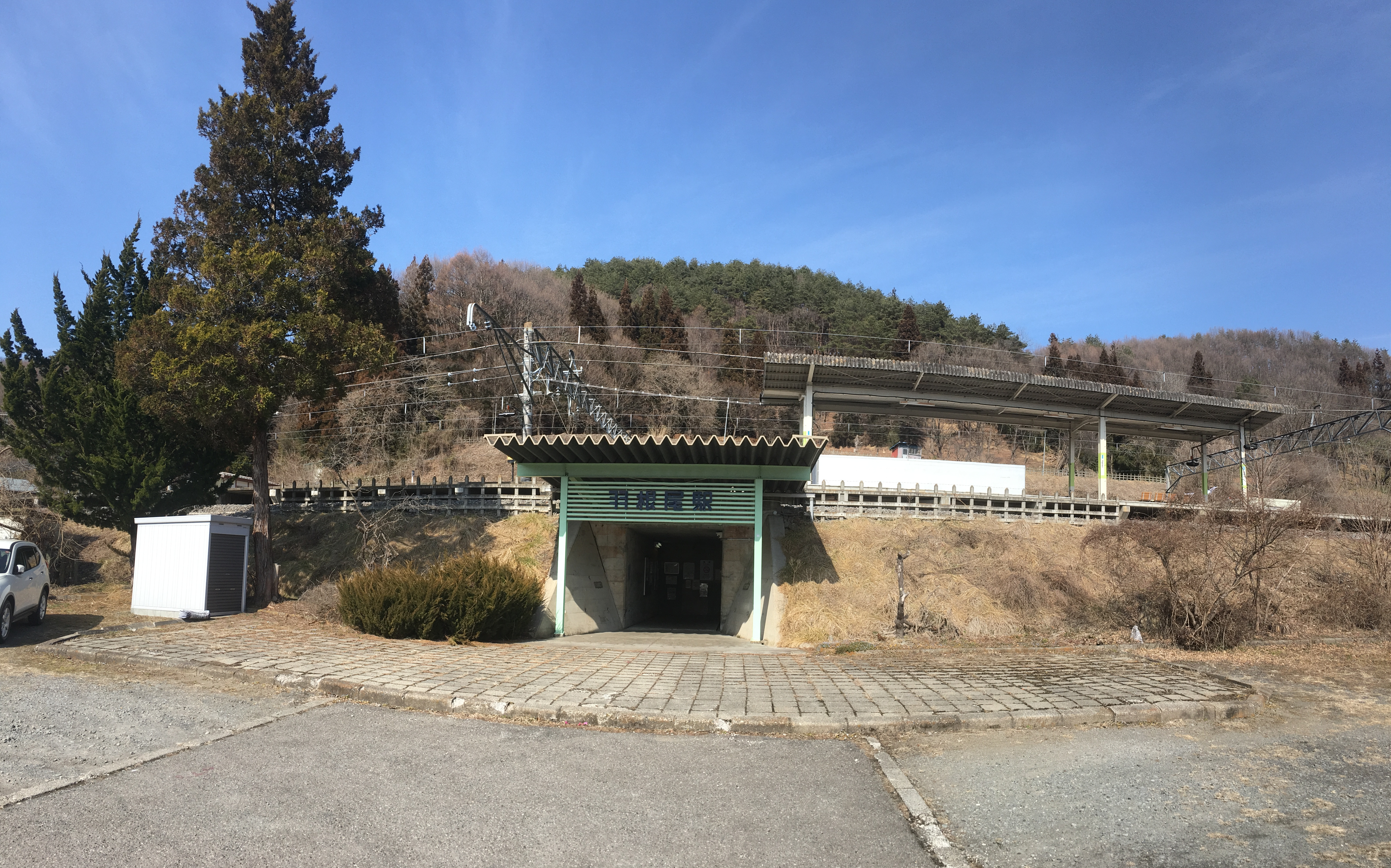
- Haneo Station in March 2020

General information
- Location: Haneo 1352-2, Naganohara-machi, Agatsuma-gun, Gunma-ken 377-1307; Japan
- Coordinates: 36.5504°N 138.6053°E
- Operator: JR East
- Line: ■ Agatsuma Line
- Distance: 46.4 km from Shibukawa
- Platforms: 1 island platform

Other information
- Status: Unstaffed
- Website: Official website

History
- Opened: 7 March 1971

Passengers
- FY2011: 41

Services
Preceding station	JR East	Following station
Fukurogura towards Ōmae	Agatsuma Line	Gunma-Ōtsu towards Takasaki
Location
- Location within Gunma Prefecture Location within Japan

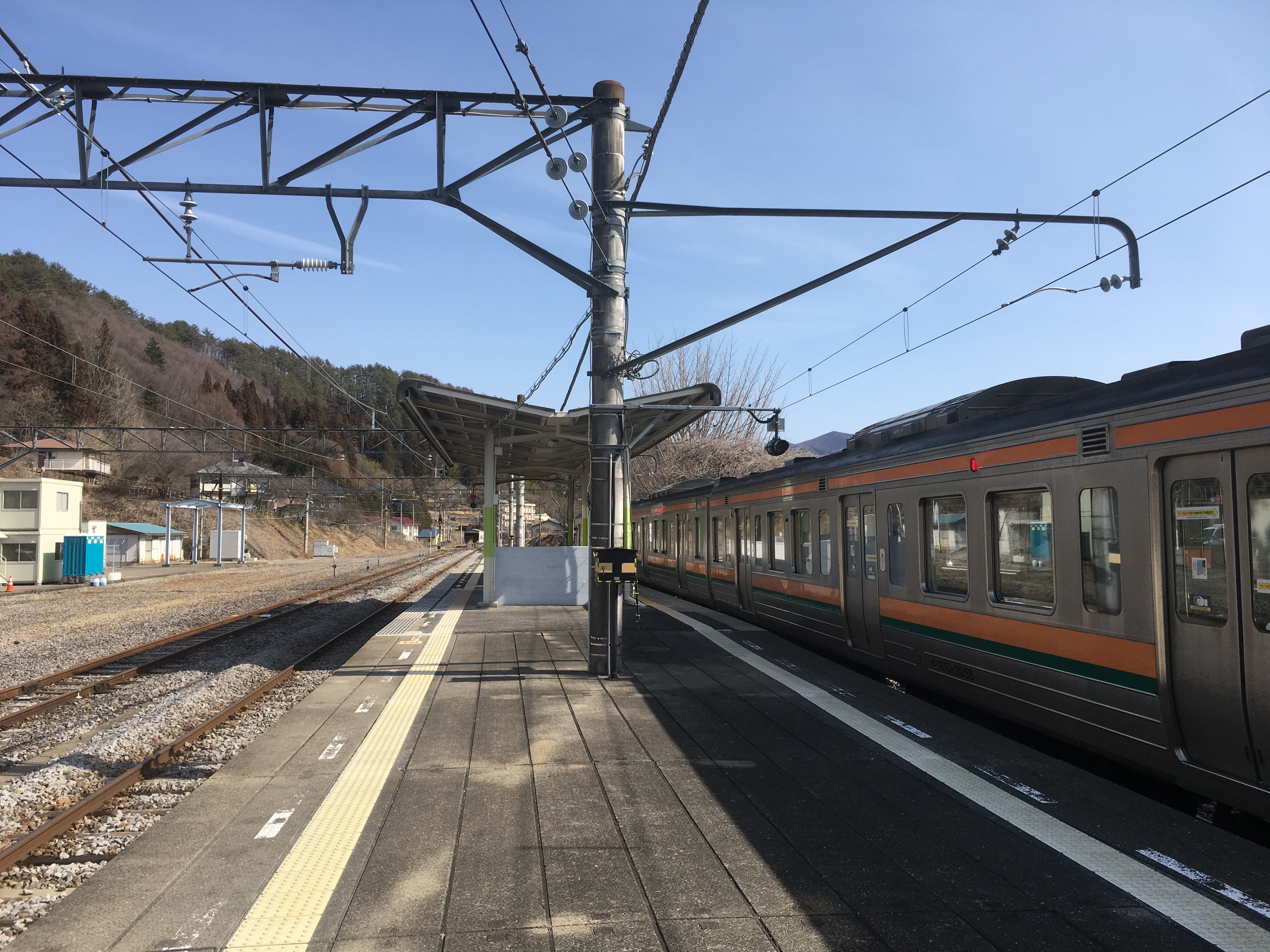
Station platforms, 2020

Haneo Station (羽根尾駅, Haneo-eki) is a passenger railway station in the town of Naganohara, Gunma Prefecture, Japan, operated by East Japan Railway Company (JR East).

== Lines ==
Haneo Station is a station on the Agatsuma Line, and is located 46.4 rail kilometers from the opposing terminus of the line at Shibukawa Station.

== Station layout ==
The station consists of a single island platform on an embankment, accessed from underneath. There is a weather shelter on the platform but no station building. The station is unattended.

=== Platforms ===
1	■ Agatsuma Line	for Manza-Kazawaguchi and Ōmae
2	■ Agatsuma Line	for Naganohara-Kusatsuguchi and Takasaki

== History ==
Haneo Station was opened on 7 March 1971. The station was absorbed into the JR East network upon the privatization of the Japanese National Railways (JNR) on 1 April 1987.

== Surrounding area ==
- National Route 144
- National Route 145
- National Route 146
- Agatsuma River

== See also ==
- List of railway stations in Japan
