= Nozori Dam =

Dam in Gunma Prefecture, Japan

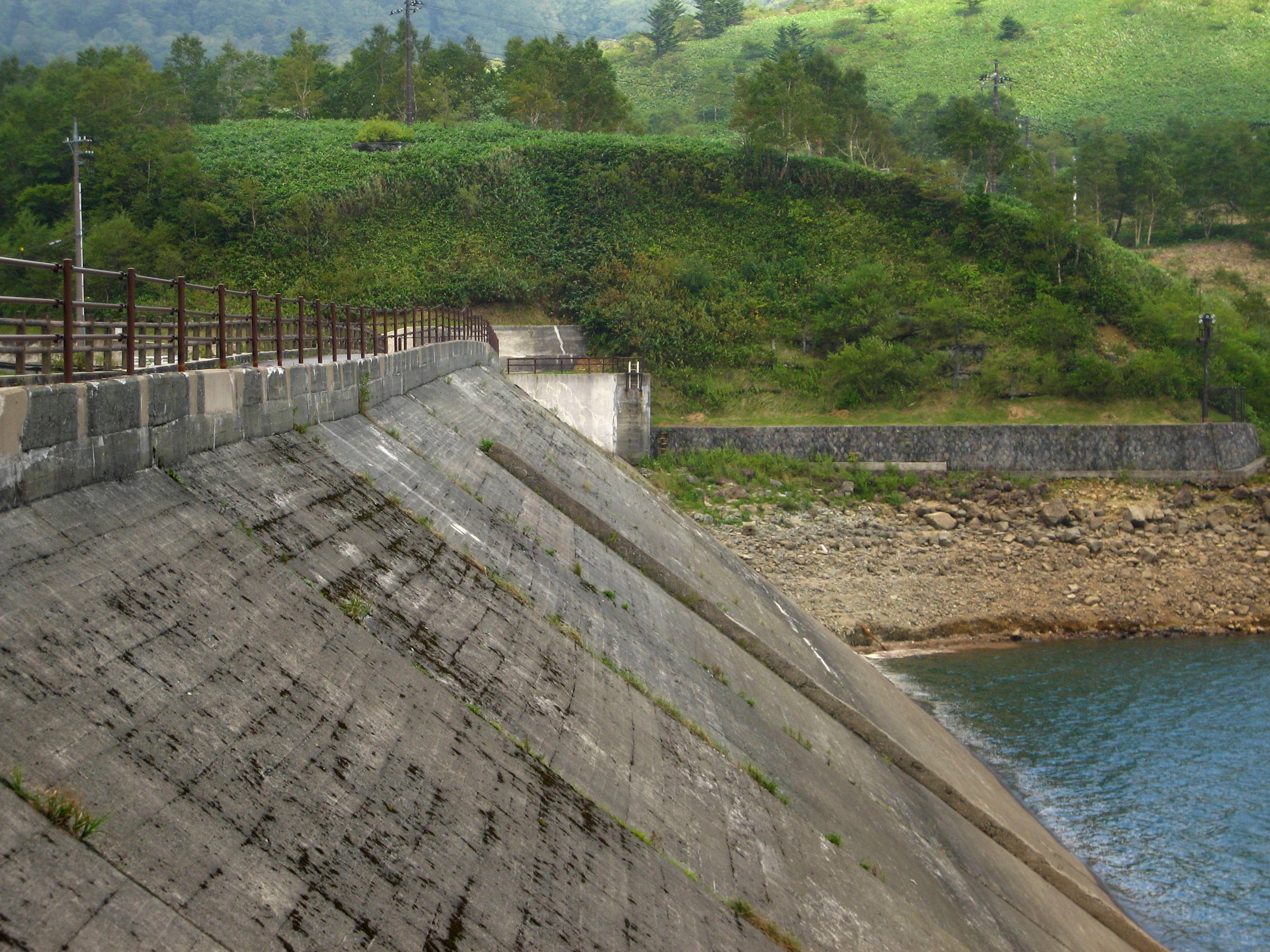
- Interactive map of Nozori Dam
- Location: Gunma Prefecture, Japan.
- Coordinates: 36°43′07″N 138°38′29″E
- Construction began: 1953
- Opening date: 1956

Dam and spillways
- Type of dam: Gravity
- Impounds: Nakatsu River
- Height: 44 m (144 ft)
- Length: 152.5 m (500 ft)

Reservoir
- Creates: Lake Nozori
- Total capacity: 27,050,000 m^{3} (955,000,000 cu ft)
- Catchment area: 16.56 km^{2} (6.39 sq mi)
- Surface area: 180 hectares

Nozori Dam (野反ダム) is a dam located in the town of Nakanojō, Agatsuma District, Gunma Prefecture, Japan. It is a hydroelectric dam operated by Tokyo Electric Power Company. The lake created by the dam is known as Lake Nozori (野反湖, nozori-ko).

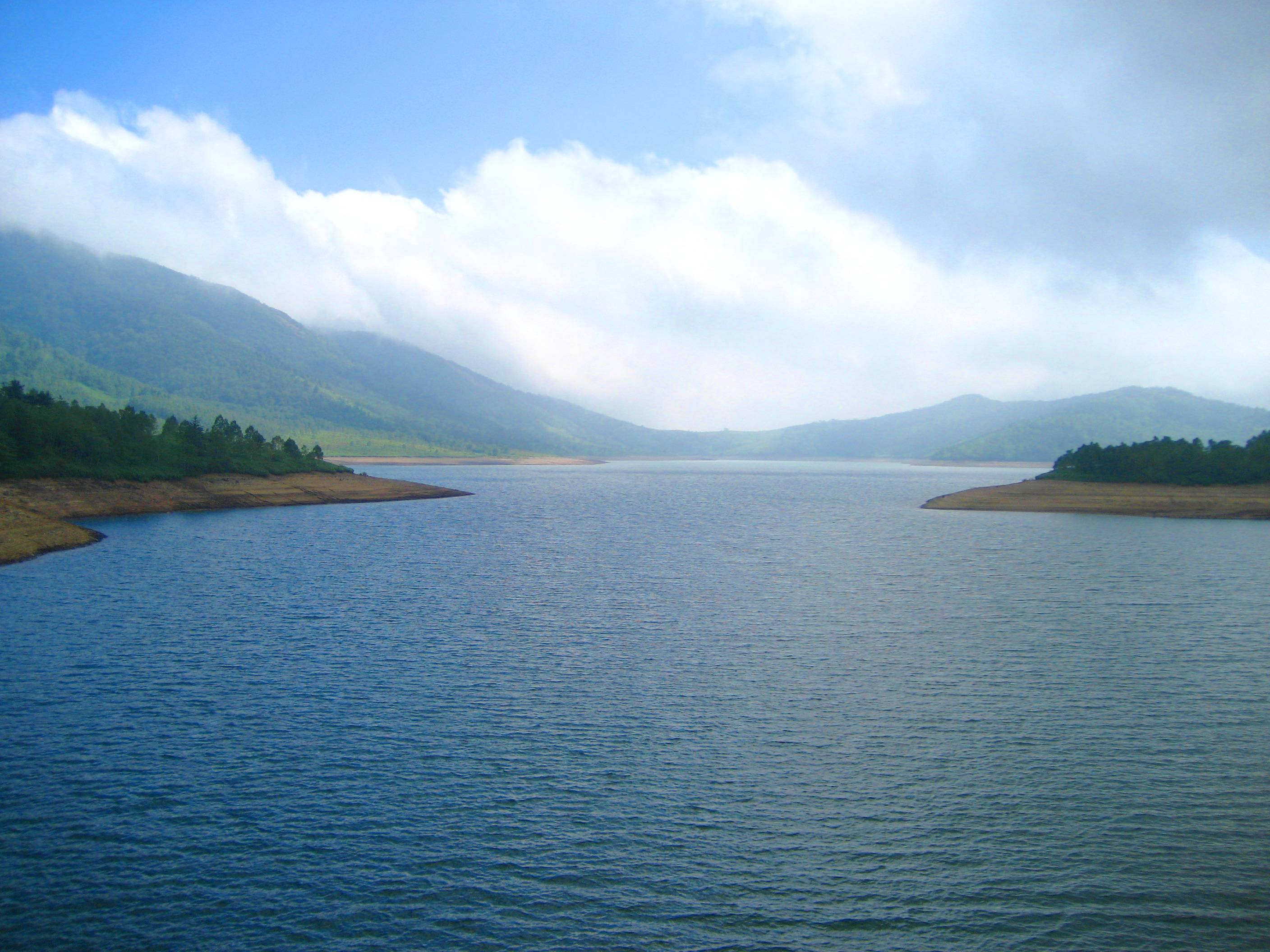

== Access ==
- Rose Queen Kotsu
  - From Naganohara-Kusatsuguchi Station
