= Yamba Dam =

八ッ場ダム Yamba Dam
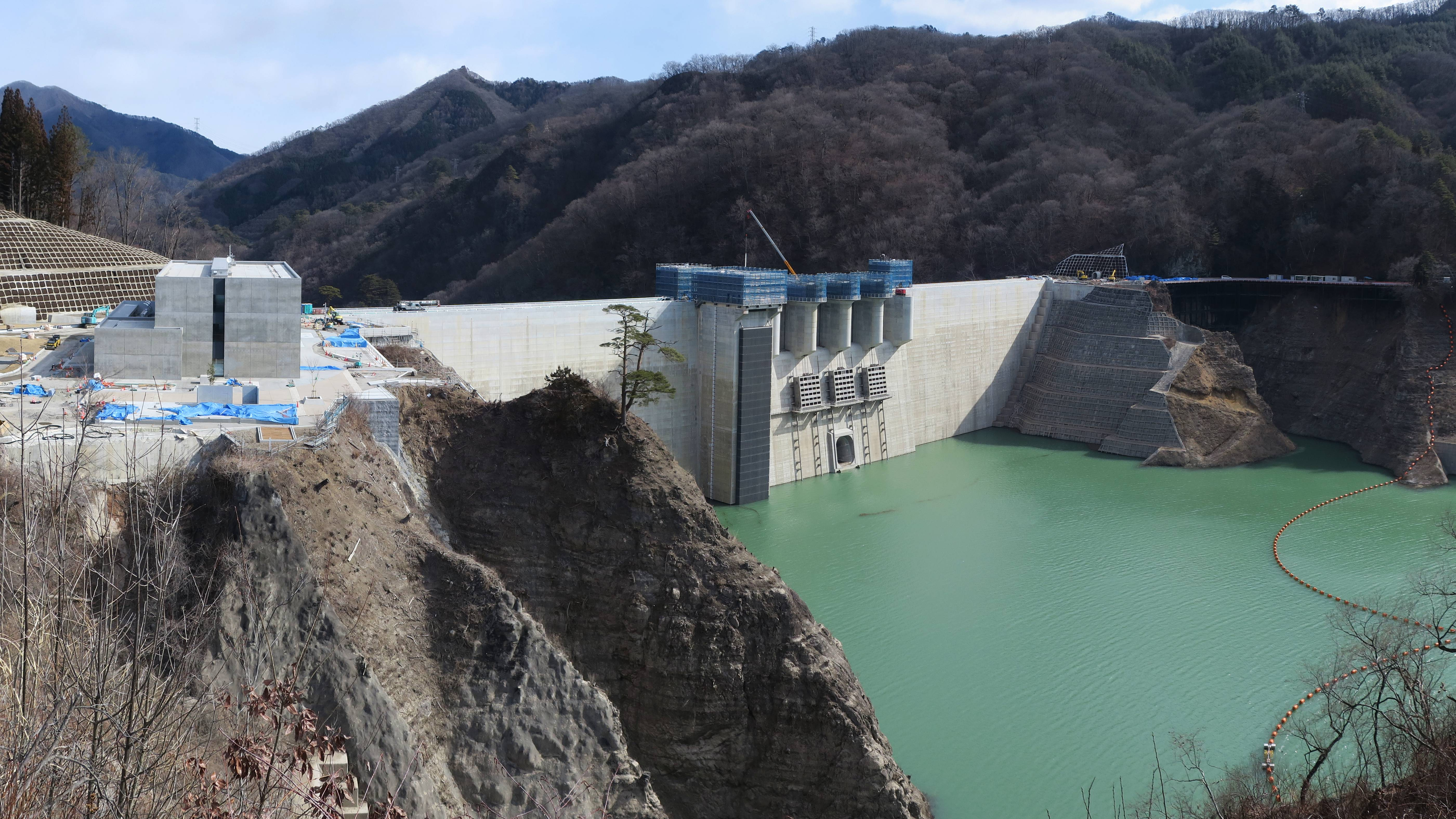
- Location: Gunma Prefecture, Japan
- Coordinates: 36°33′25″N 138°42′51″E
- Construction began: 1967
- Opening date: 2019
- Construction cost: 532 Billion Yen

Dam and spillways
- Type of dam: Gravity
- Impounds: Agatsuma River
- Height: 131 m (430 ft)
- Length: 336 m (1,102 ft)

Reservoir
- Creates: Lake Yamba-Agatsuma
- Total capacity: 107,500,000 m^{3} (3.80×10^{9} cu ft)
- Catchment area: 707.9 km^{2} (273.3 sq mi)
- Surface area: 304 hectares

Yamba Dam (八ッ場ダム, Yamba damu) is a dam in Naganohara, Agatsuma District, Gunma Prefecture, Japan. Construction began in 1967, with effective completion in October 2019 and the official opening on 1 April 2020.

== History ==
Planning for the dam began in 1952, and it was planned to be completed by 2015. The dam's construction had seen sustained local opposition and a ballooning budget, and a change of National government in 2009 resulted in the project being halted, being about 70% completed at the time. Another change of government in 2012 resulted in the project being revived and subsequently completed.

Construction required the relocation of part of the Agatsuma Line, several roads and affected residents.

Test flooding of the reservoir began on 1 October 2019.

Yamba Power Plant, an 11,700 kW hydroelectric station attached to the dam, began operation on 1 April 2021.
