= Agatsuma Gorge =

Ravine in Japan

Agatsuma Gorge 吾妻渓谷
- IUCN category III (natural monument or feature)
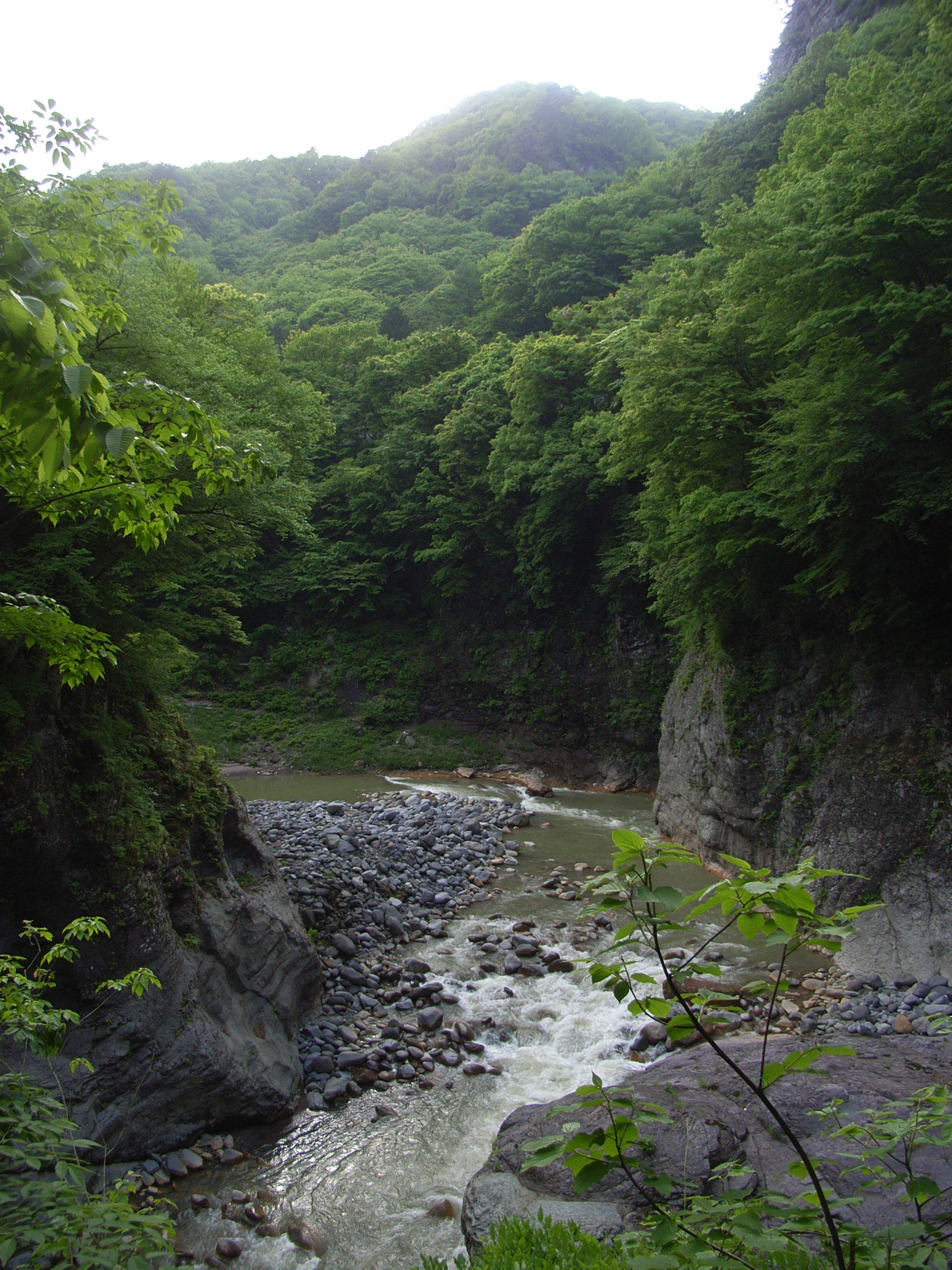
- typical panorama of Agatsuma Gorge

- Location within Gunma Prefecture Location within Japan
- Location: Higashiagatsuma, Gunma Prefecture, Japan
- Coordinates: 36°33′46″N 138°43′20″E
- Length: 2.5 km (1.6 mi)
- Established: 1935
- Place of Scenic Beauty

Agatsuma Gorge (吾妻渓谷, Agatsuma Keikoku) is a two to three kilometer long ravine on the upper and middle reaches of the Agatsuma River in the towns of Highashiagatsuma and Naganohara, Gunma Prefecture, Japan. It has been designated a National Place of Scenic Beauty since 1935. It is featured on the "ya" card in Jomo Karuta.

== Overview ==
The Agatsuma River flows through western Gunma Prefecture, crossing into Gunma via the Torii Pass from Nagano Prefecture and flowing eastward to join the Tone River at Shibukawa. A portion of the river passes through an area of eroded Miocene andesite and tuff breccia, forming a narrow ravine. The difference in height of the old route of Japan National Route 145 and the river surface is 50 meters. The river is curved and has a variety of landscapes such as pools, waterfalls, and strangely shaped rock formations. Surrounded by deciduous broad-leaved forests, it is a famous spot for viewing autumn leaves. In addition, natural concentrations of azaleas in spring draw many visitors.

Before the modern period, the Agatsuma Gorge was isolated and had very few visitors. A road was first opened in 1895, and afterwards the JR East Agatsuma Line provided rail service.

== Gallery ==
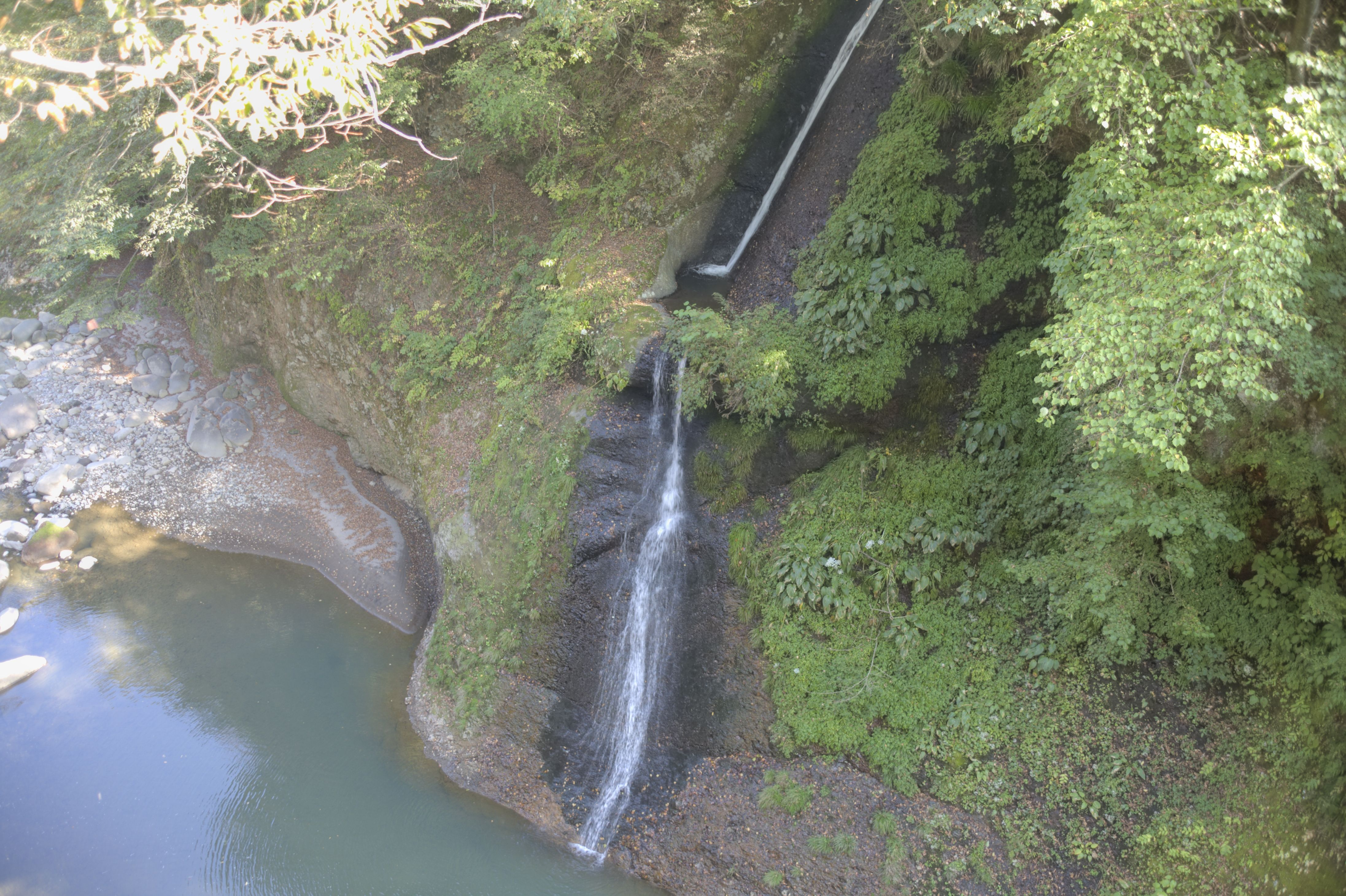
Panoramic View

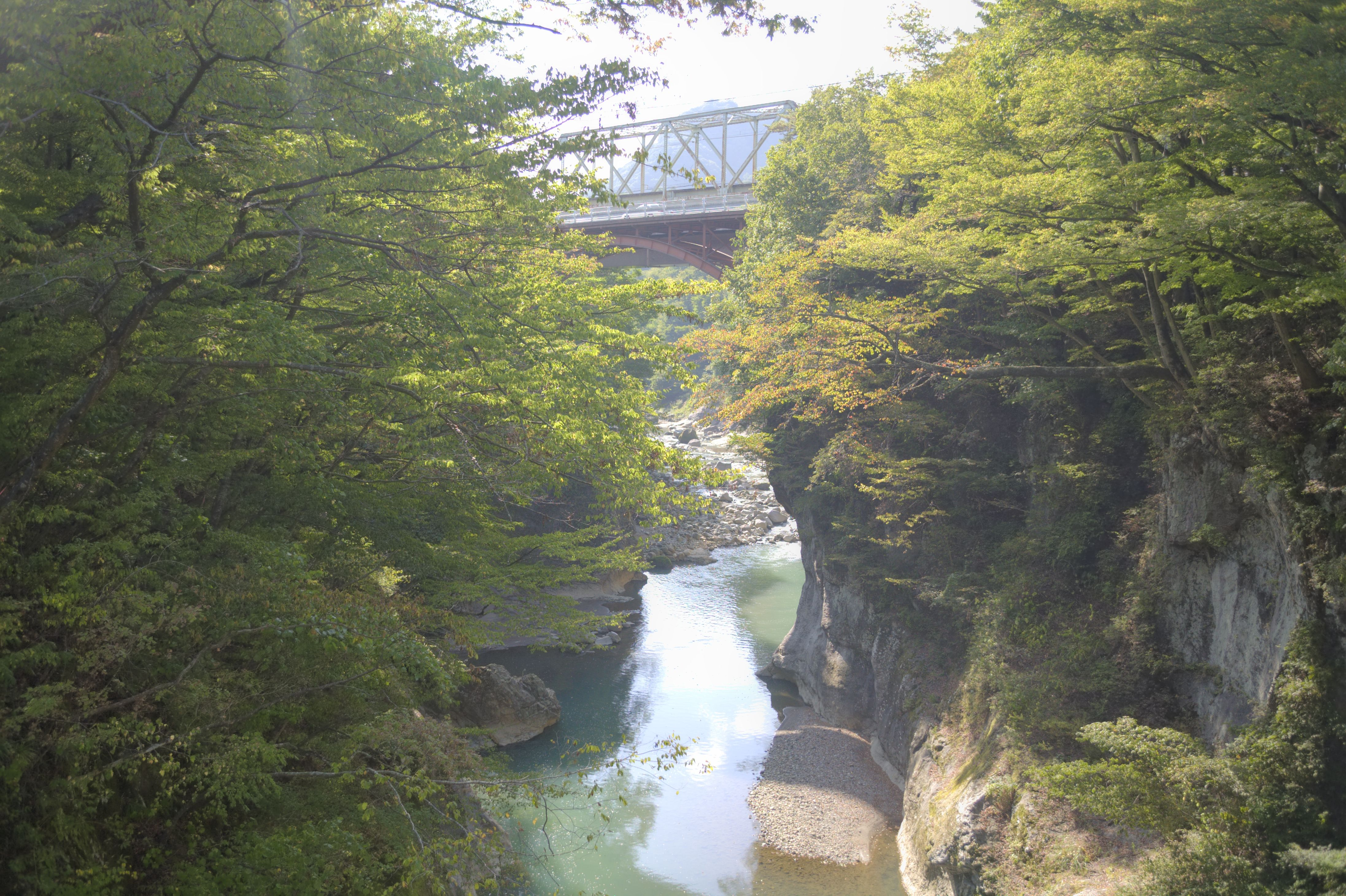
Panoramic View

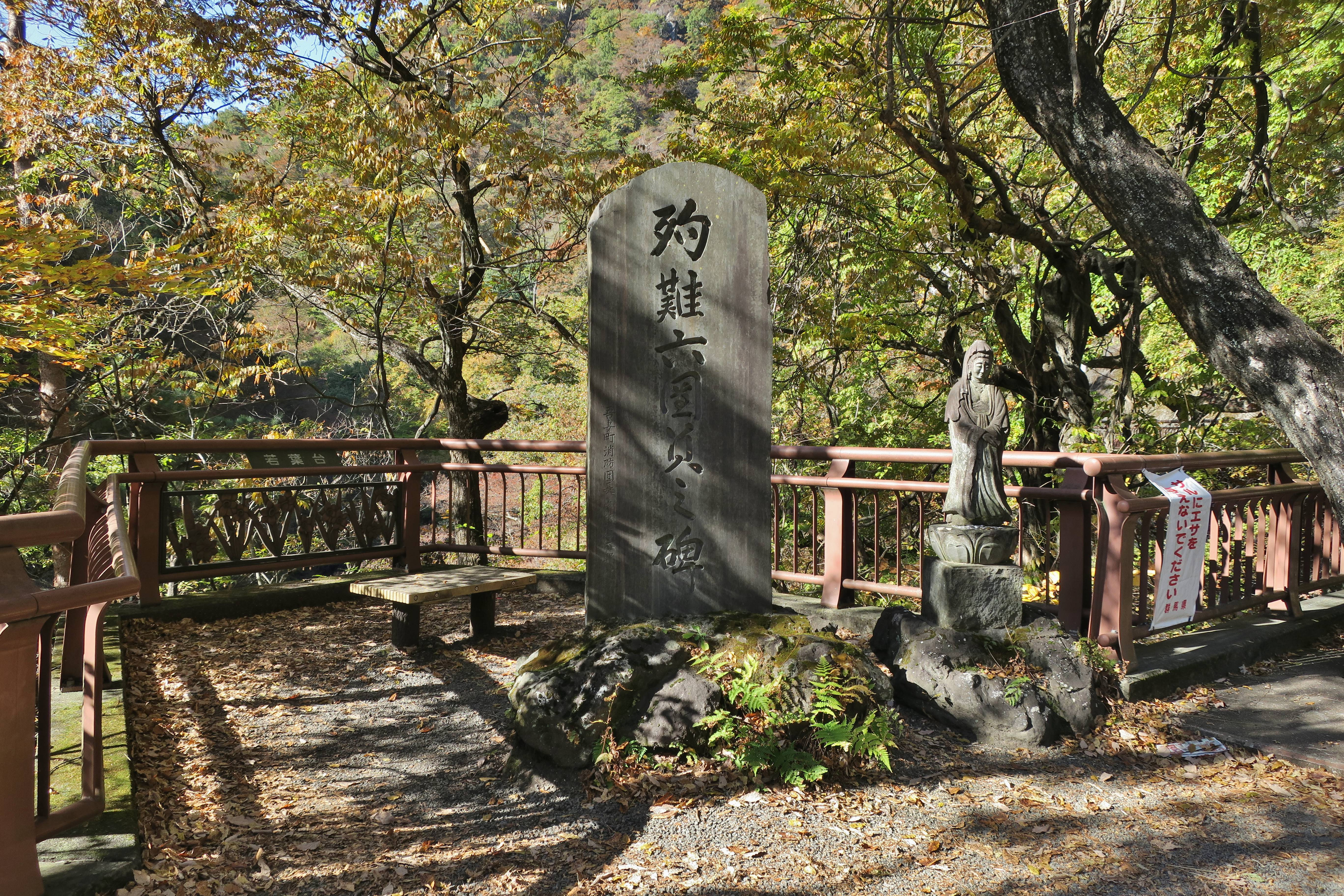
Agatsumakyo fire brigade fall accident cenotaph

== See also ==
- List of Places of Scenic Beauty of Japan (Gunma)
