= Yamba Tenmei Mudflow Museum =

- やんば天明泥流ミュージアム
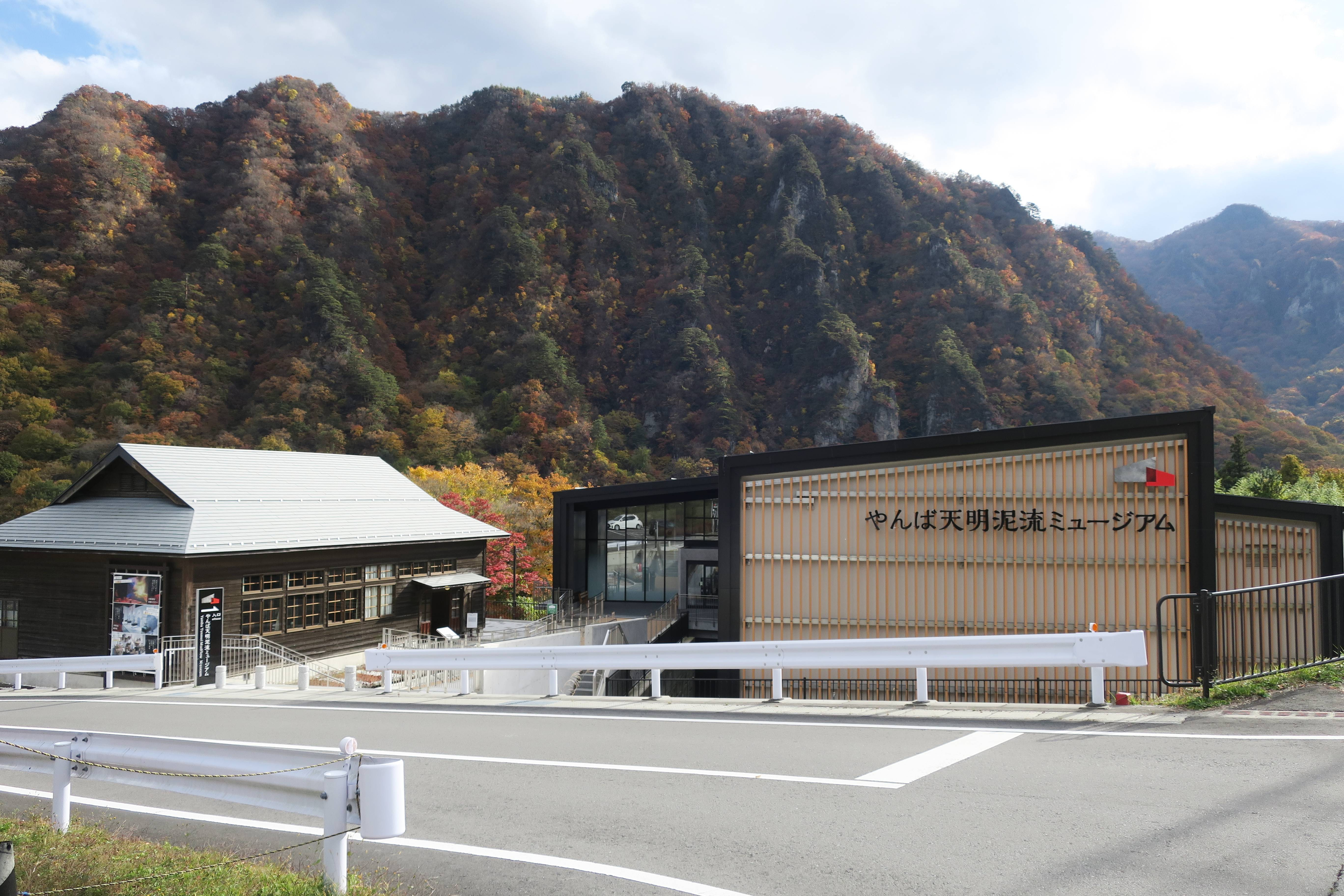

General information
- Location: 1464-3 Hayashi, Naganohara, Gunma, Japan
- Coordinates: 36°32′38″N 138°40′47.5″E
- Opened: April 3, 2021

Website
- Official website

The Yamba Tenmei Mudflow Museum (やんば天明泥流ミュージアム) is a disaster museum located in Naganohara, Gunma prefecture, Japan. It opened on April 3, 2021.

== Overview ==
The Yamba Tenmei Mudflow Museum is telling about the disasters caused by the Tenmei mudflow in Edo period.

The Tenmei mudflow means a large-scale volcanic mudflow caused by the 1783 eruption of Mount Asama, killed 1,523 people and destroyed 2,065 homes.

This museum houses a collection of artifacts from the time of the eruption that were excavated from the areas submerged by the Yamba Dam.

In the areas submerged by the Yamba Dam flooded area, excavation surveys covering approximately one million square meters were carried out over a 26-year period from 1994 to 2019.

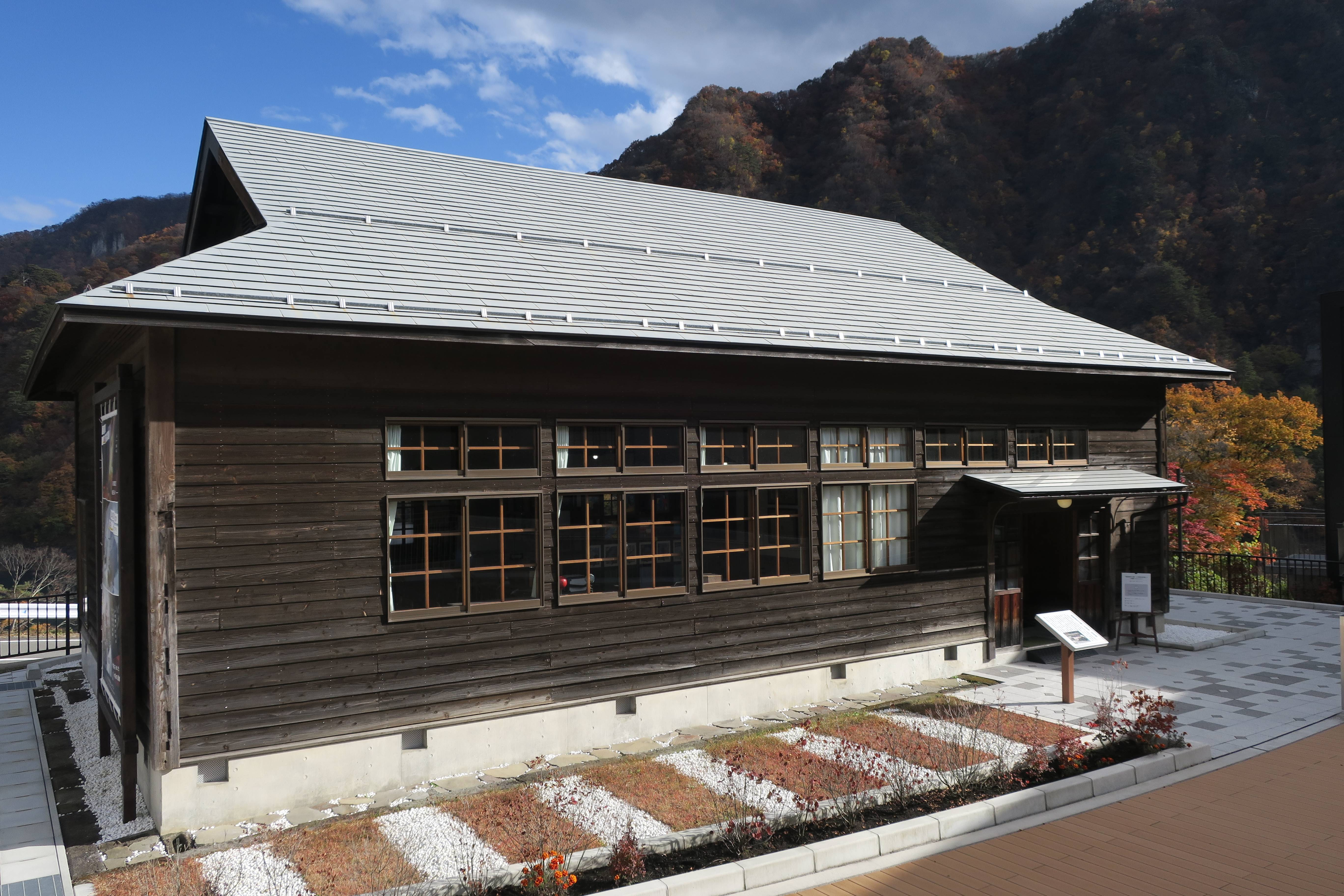
Former Naganohara Daiichi Elementary School building

Adjacent to the museum, the former Naganohara Daiichi Elementary School building, which was used until 2002, has been relocated and educational materials are on display.
