= Shima Tamura =

- Native name: 四万たむら
- Industry: Hotel
- Founded: 1563
- Headquarters: 4180 Shima, Agatsuma-gun, Gunma 377-0601, Nakanojō, Gunma Prefecture, Japan
- Website: shimaonsen.com/en

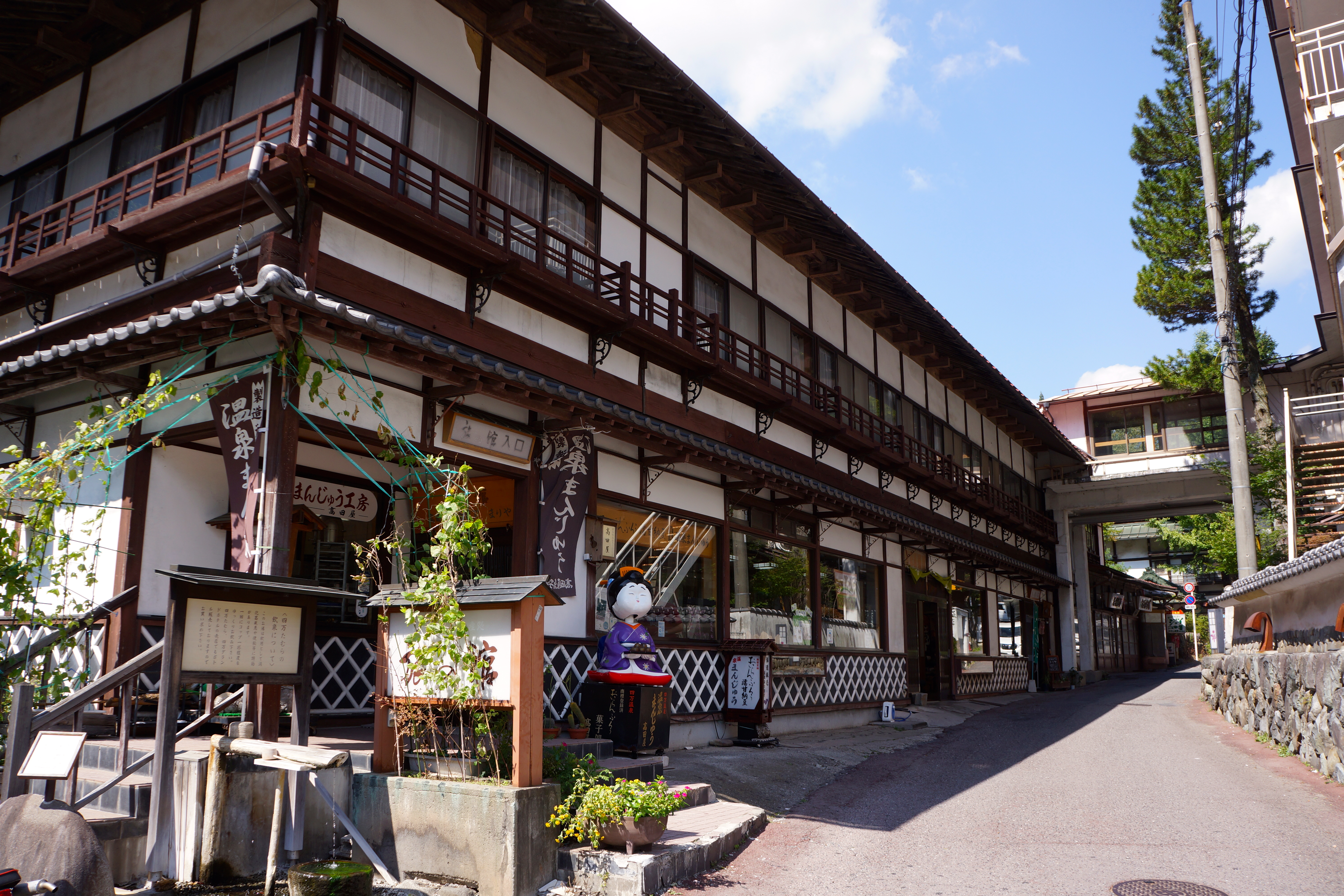
Shima Tamura

Shima Tamura is a traditional Japanese ryokan founded in 1563 and located near the Shima Onsen in Nakanojō town, Gunma Prefecture.

Shima Onsen is one of the top onsens (hot spring baths) in Japan, because it can cure many diseases.

== See also ==
- List of oldest companies
