= Gunma-Haramachi Station =

Railway station in Higashiagatsuma, Gunma Prefecture, Japan

Gunma-Haramachi Station 群馬原町駅
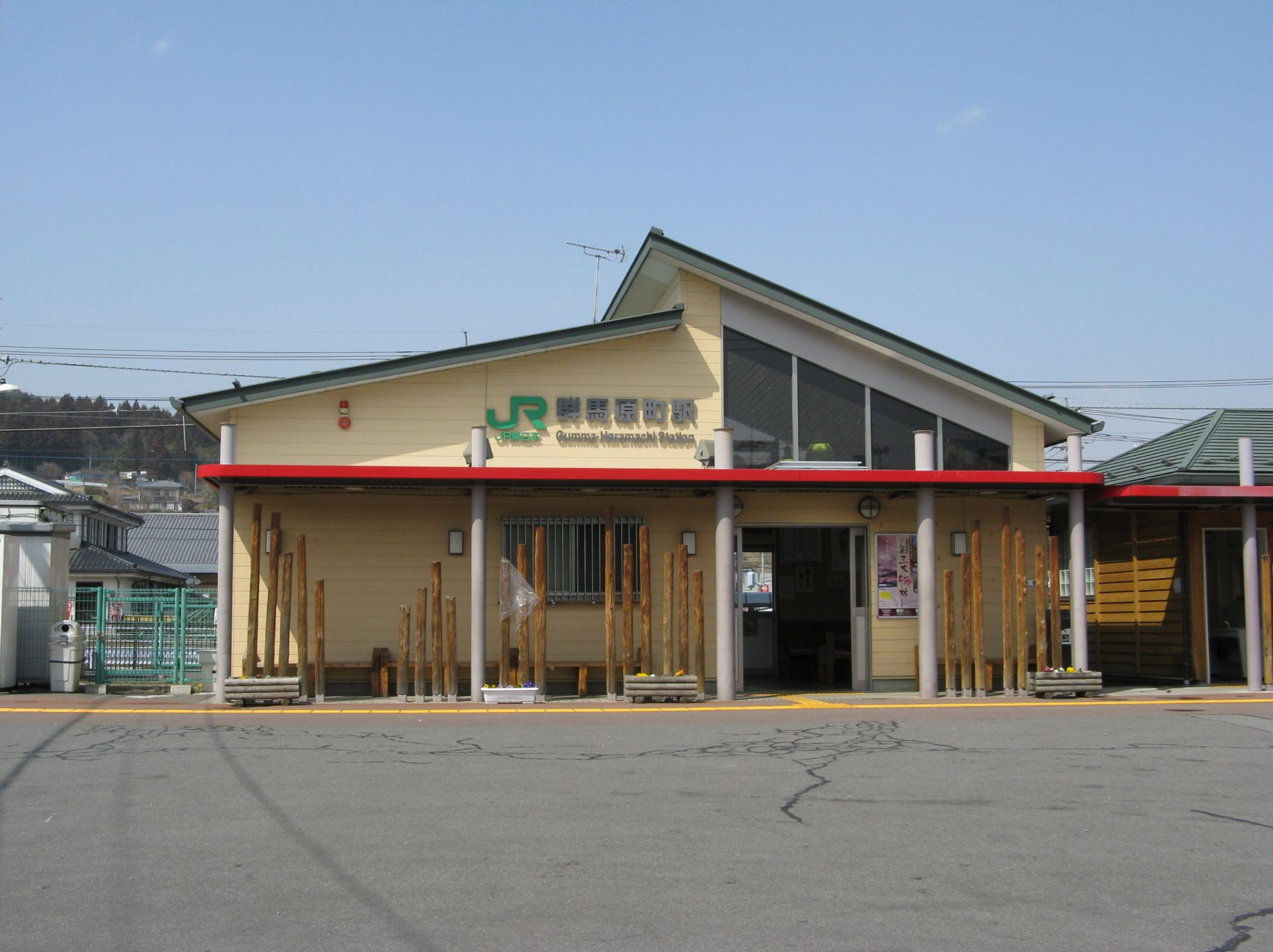
- Gunma-Haramachi Station in August 2007

General information
- Location: Haramachi 627, Higashiagatsuma-machi, Agatsuma-gun, Gunma-ken 377-0801; Japan
- Coordinates: 36.5715°N 138.8241°E
- Operator: JR East
- Line: ■ Agatsuma Line
- Distance: 22.9 km from Shibukawa
- Platforms: 1 side platform

Other information
- Status: Unstaffed
- Website: Official website

History
- Opened: 5 August 1945

Passengers
- FY2015: 488

Services
Preceding station	JR East	Following station
Gōbara towards Ōmae	Agatsuma Line	Nakanojō towards Takasaki
Location
- Location within Gunma Prefecture Location within Japan

Gunma-Haramachi Station (群馬原町駅, Gunma-Haramachi-eki) is a passenger railway station in the town of Higashiagatsuma, Gunma Prefecture, Japan, operated by East Japan Railway Company (JR East).

== Lines ==
Gunma-Haramachi Station is a station on the Agatsuma Line, and is located 22.9 rail kilometers from the terminus of the line at Shibukawa Station.

== Station layout ==
The station consists of a single side platform serving bi-directional traffic.

== History ==
Gunma-Haramachi Station was opened on 5 August 1945. The station was absorbed into the JR East network upon the privatization of the Japanese National Railways (JNR) on 1 April 1987. A new station building was completed in February 2002.

== Passenger statistics ==
In fiscal 2015, the station was used by an average of 488 passengers daily (boarding passengers only).

== Surrounding area ==
- Higashiagatsuma Town Hall
- Haramachi Post Office
- Nurukawa Onsen

== See also ==
- List of railway stations in Japan
