= Higashiagatsuma, Gunma =

Higashiagatsuma 東吾妻町
- Town
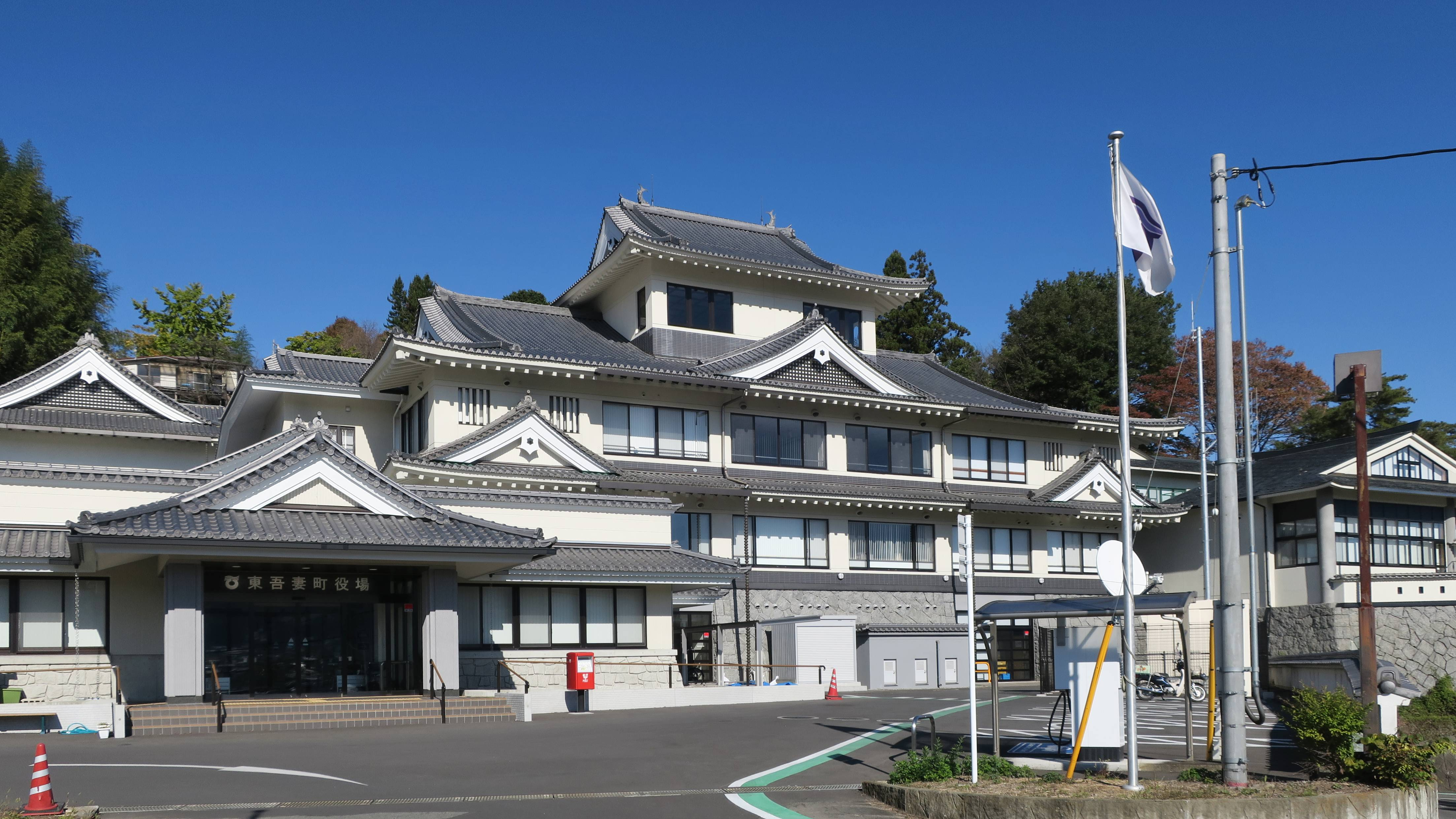
- Higashiagatsuma town office

- Flag Emblem

- Location of Higashiagatsuma in Gunma Prefecture

- Coordinates: 36°34′17″N 138°49′13″E
- Country: Japan
- Region: Kantō
- Prefecture: Gunma
- District: Agatsuma

Area
  - Total: 253.91 km^{2} (98.04 sq mi)

Population (September 2020)
  - Total: 13,349
  - Density: 52.574/km^{2} (136.17/sq mi)
- Time zone: UTC+9 (Japan Standard Time)
- Tree: Keyaki
- Flower: Narcissus (plant)
- Bird: Green pheasant
- Phone number: 0279-68-2111
- Address: 1046 Haramachi, Higashi-Agatsuma-machi, Agatsuma-gun, Gunma Prefecture, 377-0892
- Website: Official website

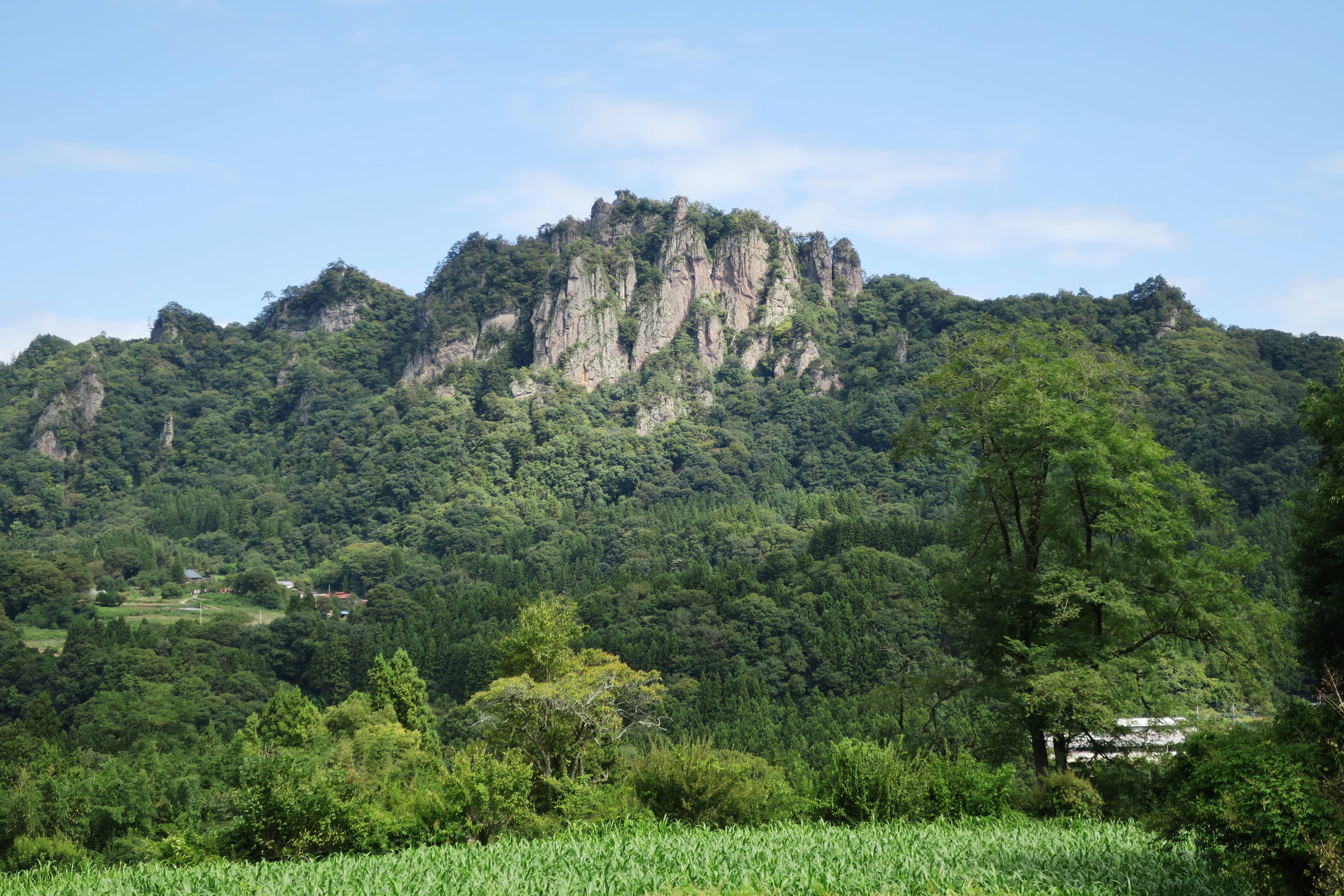
Mount Iwabitsu

Higashiagatsuma (東吾妻町, Higashiagatsuma-machi) is a town located in Gunma Prefecture, Japan. As of 31 July 2020, the town had an estimated population of 13,349 in 2467 households, and a population density of 53 persons per km^{2}. The total area of the town is 253.91 square kilometres (98.04 sq mi).

== Geography ==
Located in the northwestern portion of Gunma Prefecture, Higashiagatsuma is surrounded by high peaks, including Mount Iwabitsu (802.6 meters). The town hall is 619 meters above sea level.

- Mountains: Mount Iwabitsu, Yakushidake, Sugamine
- Rivers: Agatsuma River, Ishikami River
- Lakes: Lake Haruna

=== Surrounding municipalities ===
Gunma Prefecture

- Naganohara
- Nakanojō
- Shibukawa
- Takasaki

=== Climate ===
Higashiagatsuma has a humid subtropical climate (Köppen Cfa) characterized by warm summers and cold winters with heavy snowfall. The average annual temperature in Higashiagatsuma is 10.8 °C. The average annual rainfall is 1213 mm with September as the wettest month. The temperatures are highest on average in August, at around 23.7 °C, and lowest in January, at around -1.4 °C.

== Demographics ==
Per Japanese census data, the population of Higashiagatsuma has declined considerably over the past 70 years.

Historical population
Year	Pop.	±%
1920	19,164	—
1930	20,564	+7.3%
1940	21,051	+2.4%
1950	30,082	+42.9%
1960	24,624	−18.1%
1970	20,801	−15.5%
1980	19,975	−4.0%
1990	19,169	−4.0%
2000	17,689	−7.7%
2010	15,624	−11.7%
2020	12,728	−18.5%

== History ==
During the Edo period, the area around Higashiagatsuma was part of the hatamoto-administered territory within Kōzuke Province.

With the creation of the modern municipalities system after the Meiji Restoration on April 1, 1889, the town of Hara and the villages of Ota, Iwashima, and Sakaue and Azuma were created within Agatsuma District of Gunma Prefecture. The first three villages merged into Hara in 1965, which was renamed Agatsuma Town in February 1956.

Higashiagatsuma was created on March 27, 2006, by the merger of the town of Agatsuma, and the village of Azuma, both from Agatsuma District.

== Government ==
Higashiagatsuma has a mayor-council form of government with a directly elected mayor and a unicameral town council of 14 members. Higashiagatsuma collectively with the other municipalities in Agatsuma District, contributes two members to the Gunma Prefectural Assembly. In terms of national politics, the town is part of Gunma 5th district of the lower house of the Diet of Japan.

== Economy ==
The economy of Higashiagatsuma is heavily dependent on agriculture and seasonal tourism. Noted local crops include konjac and myoga production. Tourism from ski resorts and onsen hot springs also contribute to the local economy. Mount Ajara was a venue for the 2003 Asian Winter Games.

== Education ==
Higashiagatsuma has five public elementary schools and one public middle school operated by the town government, and one public special needs high school operated by the Gunma Prefectural Board of Education.

== Transportation ==
=== Railway ===
JR East – Agatsuma Line

- Gunma-Haramachi - Gōbara - Yagura - Iwashima

=== Highway ===
- National Route 145
- National Route 406

== Local attractions ==
- Agatsuma Gorge, National Place of Scenic Beauty
- Iwabitsu Castle - A castle ruin of Sanada clan.
- Tarusawa Tunnel
