= Naganohara =

Naganohara 長野原町
- Town
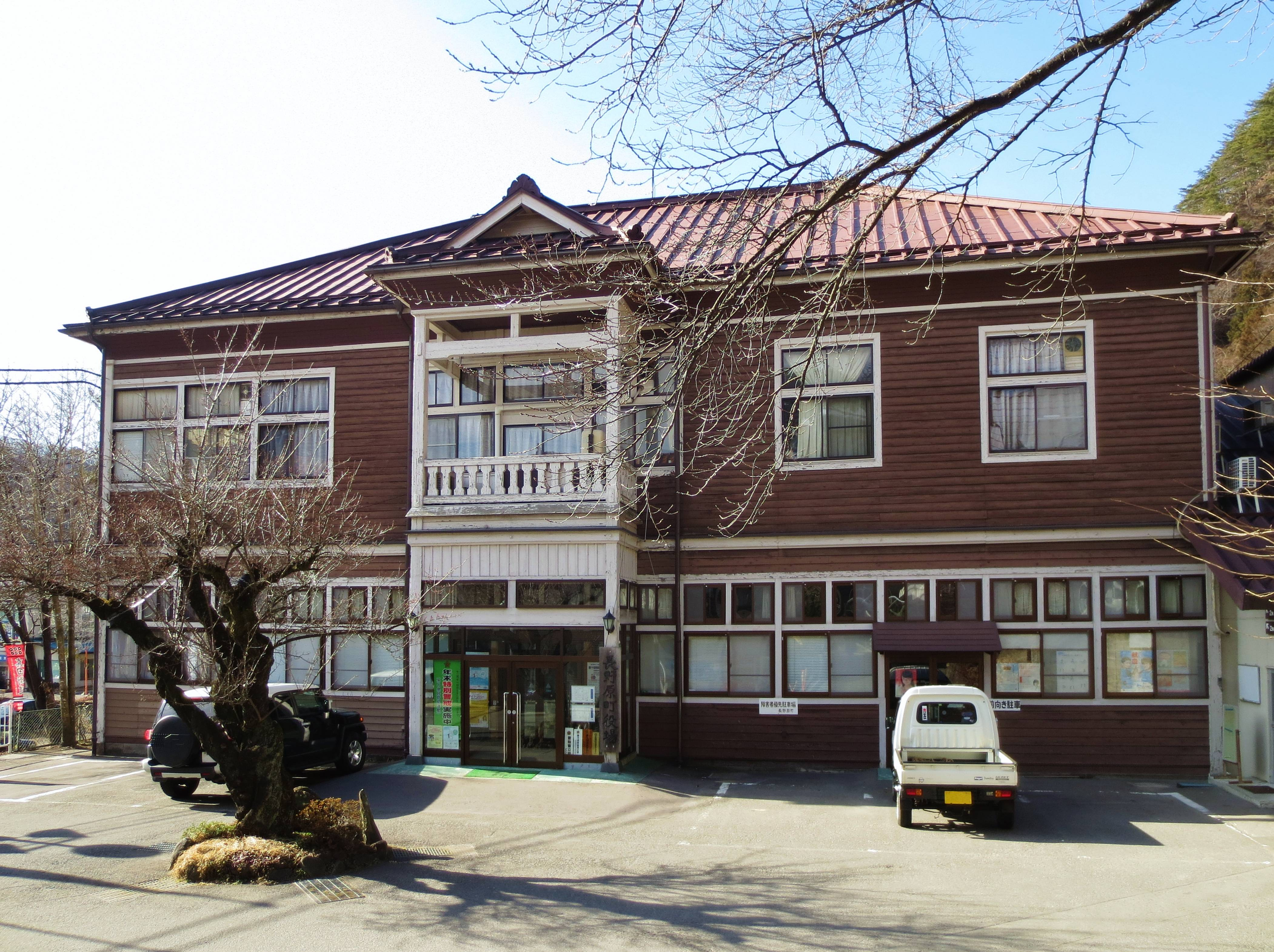
- old Naganohara town office

- Flag Seal

- Location of Naganohara in Gunma Prefecture

- Coordinates: 36°33′8.2″N 138°39′15.3″E
- Country: Japan
- Region: Kantō
- Prefecture: Gunma
- District: Agatsuma

Area
  - Total: 133.85 km^{2} (51.68 sq mi)

Population (January 2020)
  - Total: 5,495
  - Density: 41.05/km^{2} (106.3/sq mi)
- Time zone: UTC+9 (Japan Standard Time)
- Tree: Japanese Larch
- Flower: Azalea
- Bird: Copper pheasant
- Phone number: 0279-82-2244
- Address: 66-3 Naganohara, Naganohara-machi, Agatsuma-gun, Gunma-ken 377-1392
- Website: Official website

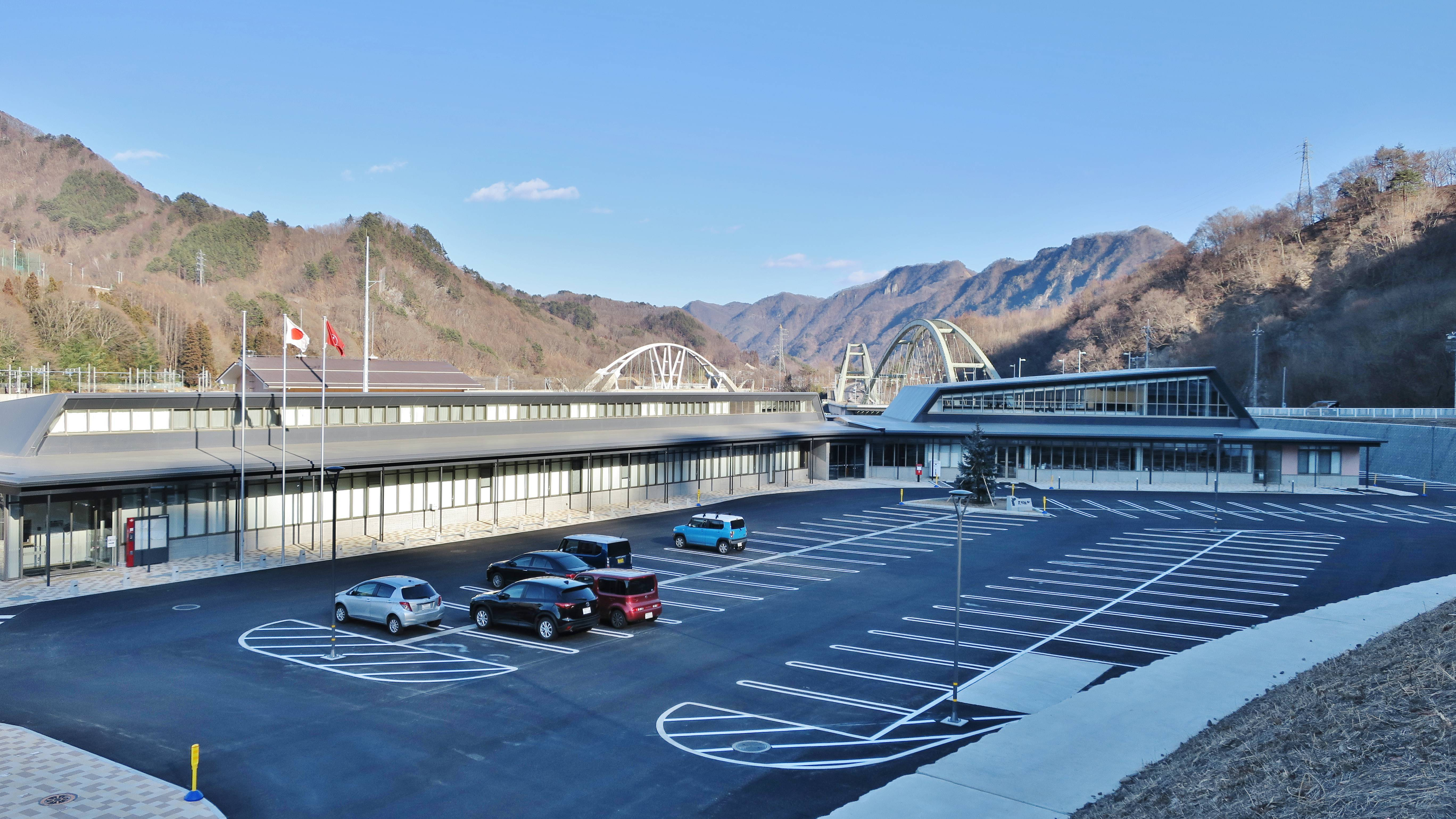
New Naganohara town office

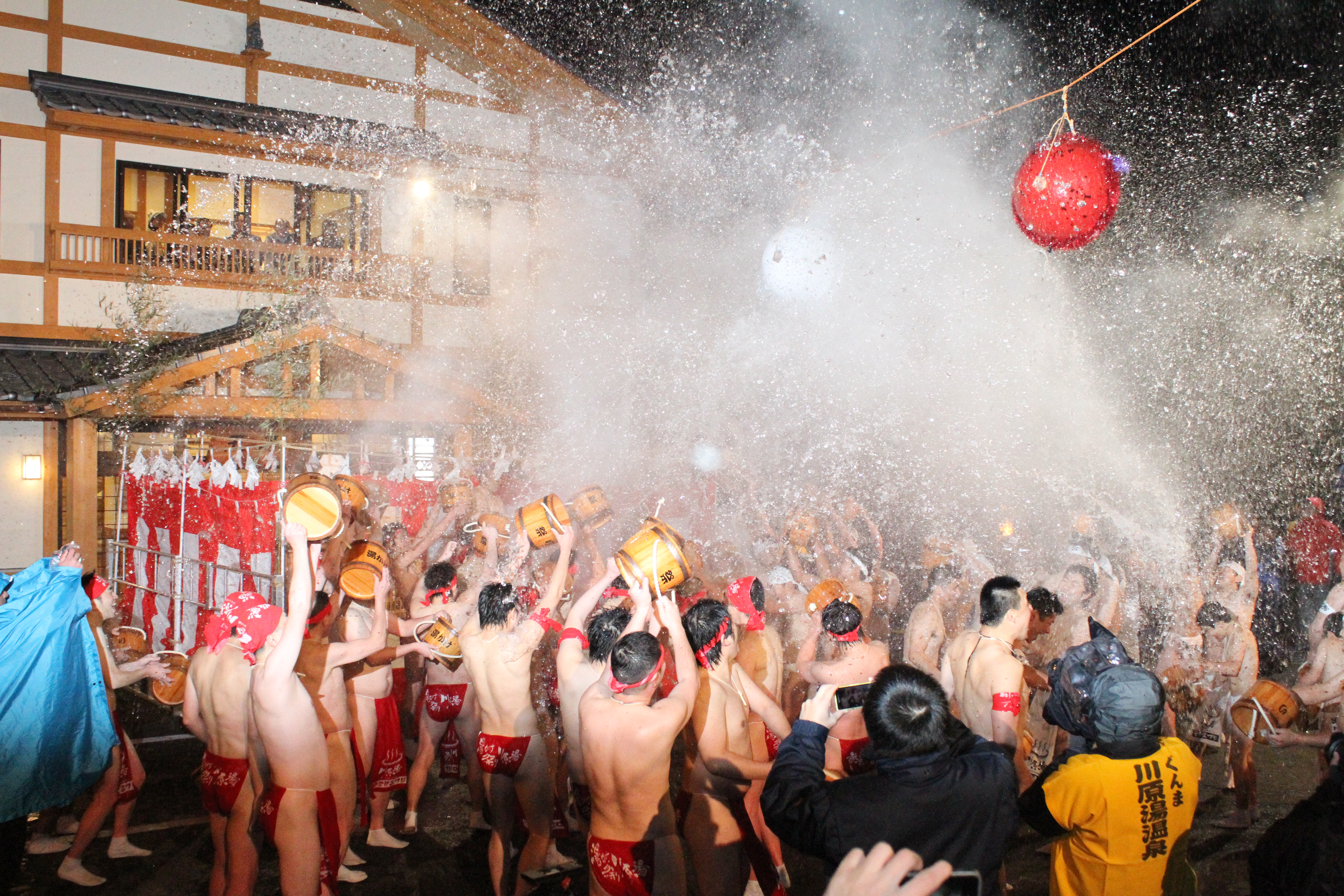
Festival at Kawahara onsen

Naganohara (長野原町, Naganohara-machi) is a town located in Gunma Prefecture, Japan.

== Population ==
As of 31 January 2020, the town had an estimated population of 5,495 in 5630 households, and a population density of 41 persons per km^{2}.

== Size ==
The total area of the town is 133.85 square kilometres (51.68 sq mi). The controversial Yamba Dam project is located within Naganohara.

== Geography ==
Located in the northwestern portion of Gunma Prefecture, almost all of Naganohara has an elevation higher than 500 meters. The town has Mount Kusatsu-Shirane (2171m) to the north and Mount Asama (2568m) to the south.

- Rivers: Agatsuma River, Shirasuna River, Kuma River

=== Surrounding municipalities ===
Gunma Prefecture

- Higashiagatsuma
- Kusatsu
- Nakanojō
- Takasaki
- Tsumagoi

Nagano Prefecture

- Karuizawa

=== Climate ===
Naganohara has a Humid continental climate (Köppen Cfa) characterized by warm summers and cold winters with heavy snowfall. The average annual temperature in Naganohara is 7.6 °C. The average annual rainfall is 1453 mm with September as the wettest month. The temperatures are highest on average in August, at around 20.4 °C, and lowest in January, at around -4.7 °C.

== Demographics ==
Per Japanese census data, the population of Naganohara has declined over the past 70 years.

Historical population
Year	Pop.	±%
1920	5,057	—
1930	5,509	+8.9%
1940	5,802	+5.3%
1950	8,018	+38.2%
1960	8,113	+1.2%
1970	7,342	−9.5%
1980	7,237	−1.4%
1990	6,878	−5.0%
2000	6,939	+0.9%
2010	6,017	−13.3%
2020	5,095	−15.3%

== History ==
The area of present-day Naganohara has human remains from the Japanese Paleolithic through Jōmon periods, although archaeological findings from the Kofun period are scarce compared with surrounding areas. During the Edo period, the area was part of the hatamoto-administered territory within Kōzuke Province.

Naganohara Town was created within Agatsuma District of Gunma Prefecture on April 1, 1889, with the creation of the modern municipalities system after the Meiji Restoration.

== Government ==
Naganohara has a mayor-council form of government with a directly elected mayor and a unicameral town council of 10 members. Naganohara collectively with the other municipalities in Agatsuma District, contributes two members to the Gunma Prefectural Assembly. In terms of national politics, the town is part of Gunma 5th district of the lower house of the Diet of Japan.

== Economy ==
The economy of Naganohara is heavily dependent on agriculture.

== Education ==
Naganohara has four public elementary schools and two public middle schools operated by the town government, and one public high schools operated by the Gunma Prefectural Board of Education.

== Transportation ==
=== Railway ===
JR East – Agatsuma Line

- Kawarayu-Onsen - Naganohara-Kusatsuguchi - Gunma-Ōtsu - Haneo

=== Highway ===
- National Route 144
- National Route 145
- National Route 146
- National Route 292
- National Route 406

== Local attractions ==
- Agatsuma Gorge, a National Place of Scenic Beauty
- Asama Volcano Museum
- Kawarayu Onsen
- Yamba Tenmei Mudflow Museum
