= Gunma-Ōtsu Station =

Railway station in Naganohara, Gunma Prefecture, Japan

Gunma-Ōtsu Station 群馬大津駅
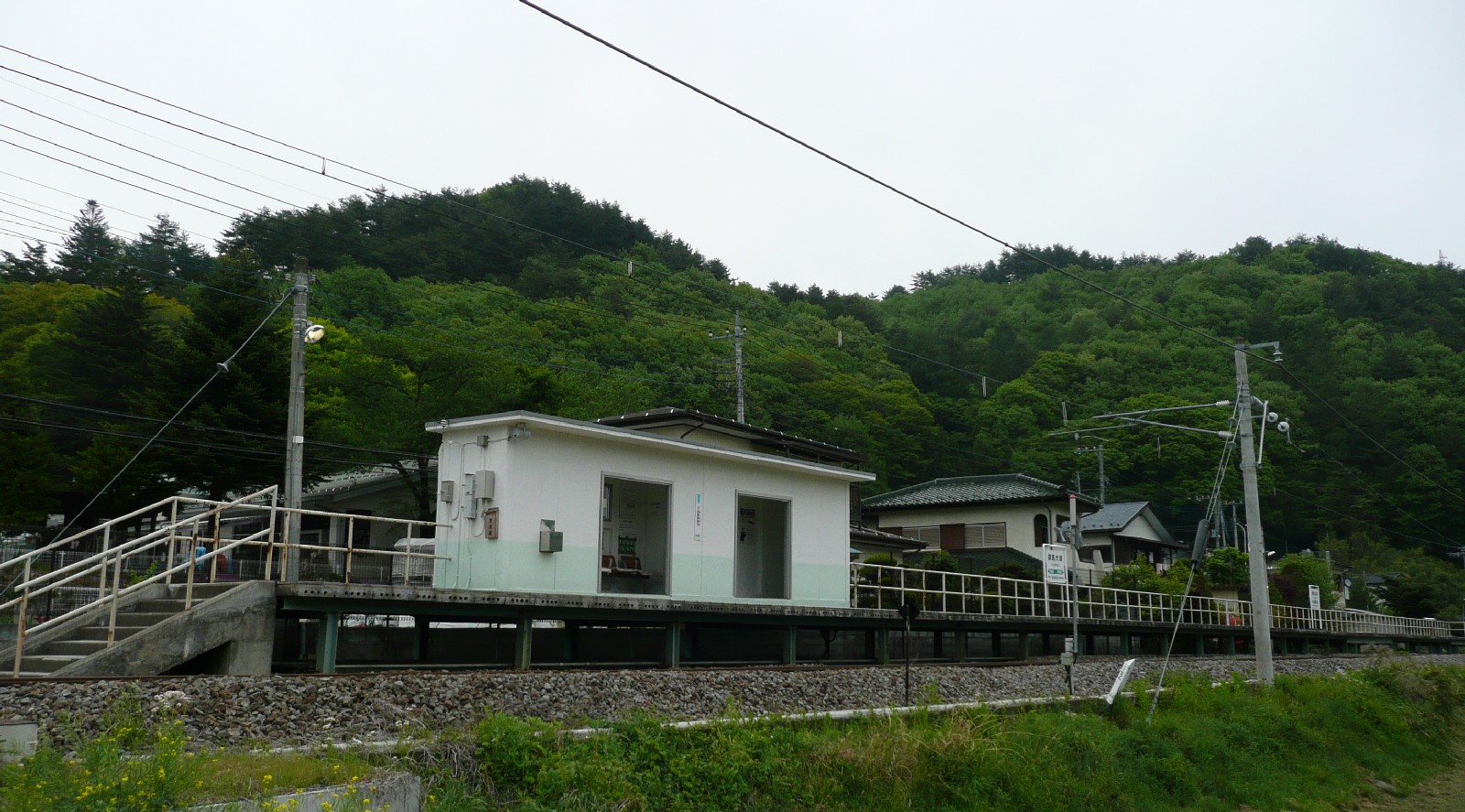
- Gunma-Ōtsu Station in May 2009

General information
- Location: Naganohara 1484-2, Naganohara-machi, Agatsuma-gun, Gunma-ken 377-1304; Japan
- Coordinates: 36.5539°N 138.6282°E
- Operator: JR East
- Line: ■ Agatsuma Line
- Distance: 44.2 km from Shibukawa
- Platforms: 1 side platform

Other information
- Status: Unstaffed
- Website: Official website

History
- Opened: 7 March 1971

Passengers
- FY2011: 86

Services
Preceding station	JR East	Following station
Haneo towards Ōmae	Agatsuma Line	Naganohara-Kusatsuguchi towards Takasaki
Location
- Location within Gunma Prefecture Location within Japan

Gunma-Ōtsu Station (群馬大津駅, Gunma-Ōtsu-eki) is a passenger railway station in the town of Naganohara, Gunma Prefecture, Japan, operated by East Japan Railway Company (JR East).

== Lines ==
Gunma-Ōtsu Station is a station on the Agatsuma Line, and is located 44.2 rail kilometers from the opposing terminus of the line at Shibukawa Station.

== Station layout ==
The station consists of a single side platform serving bidirectional traffic. The station is unattended.

== History ==
Gunma-Ōtsu Station was opened on 7 March 1971. The station was absorbed into the JR East network upon the privatization of the Japanese National Railways (JNR) on 1 April 1987.

== Surrounding area ==
- Naganohara Town Hall
- National Route 145
- Naganohara Post Office

== See also ==
- List of railway stations in Japan
