= Yagibushi =

Song performed by Chiemi Eri

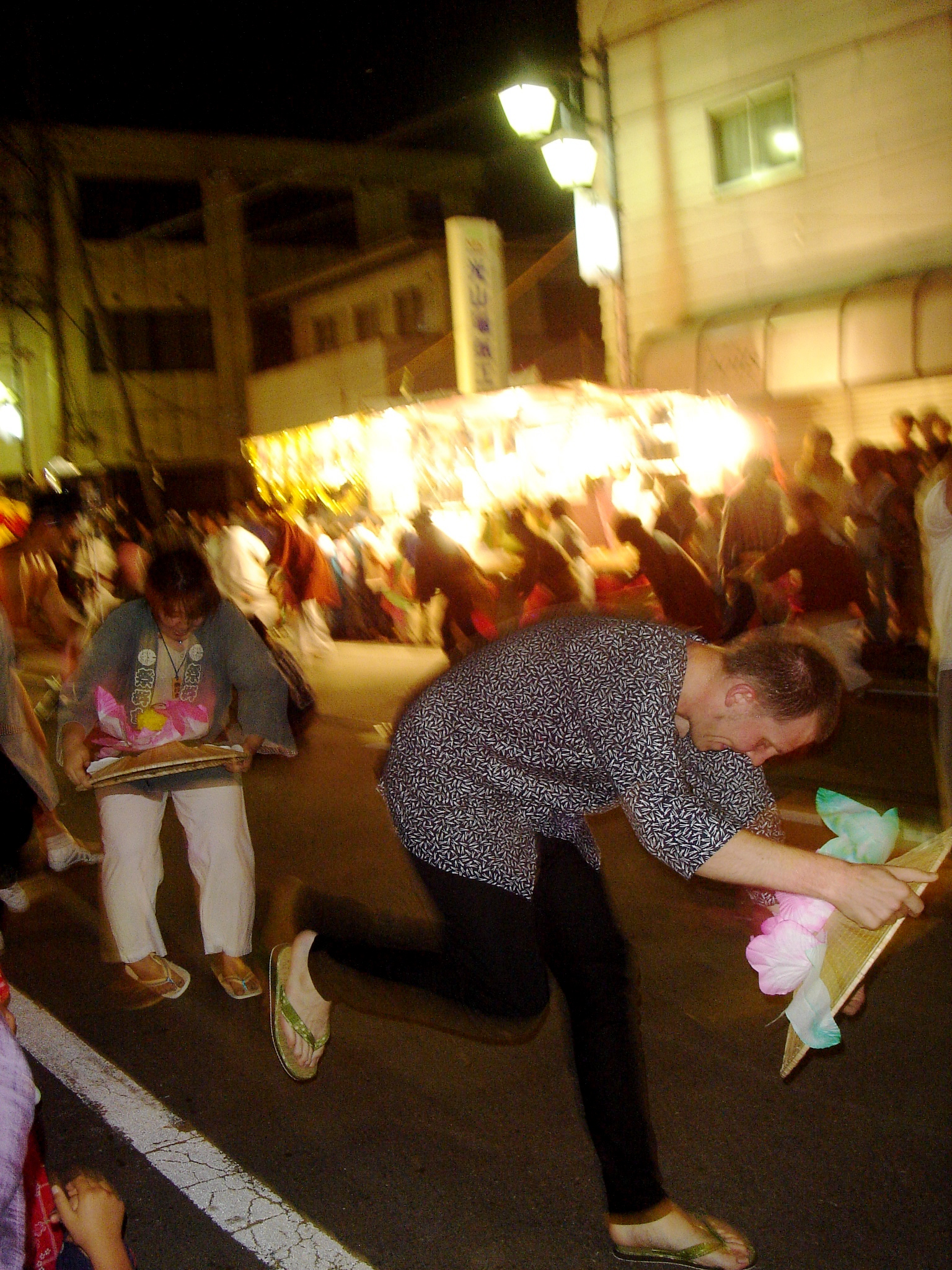
Yagibushi Dancers at Isemachi Matsuri

The Yagibushi (Japanese: 八木節; meaning song of yagi) is a popular folk song and dance performed at matsuri (and occasionally Undokai sports days) in Gunma and Tochigi, Japan. It consists of dancers with broad hats called kasa going in a counter clockwise circle around a mikoshi. The dance is very energetic and ends with everyone throwing their hats in the air. The "Yagi" (八木, literally "eight trees") came from Yagi-shuku, one of the post stations on the Nikkō Reiheishi Kaidō Road, and is not to be confused with the "yagi" (山羊, goat).

== History ==
The song was first sung by Seizaburo Maruyama, who was from the town of Asakura (currently Ashikaga, Tochigi) and known as "Seizo Asakura", and popularized by Gentaro Watanabe "Genta Horigome".

The original form of the song is said to be Shimpo Kōdaiji (新保広大寺), which originated in Niigata. It was later arranged and spread along the Nikkō Reiheishi Kaidō Road by craftmen and traveling entertainers such as Goze. Eventually one around Yagi-shuku became the most popular, where Watanabe and others developed today's form.
