= Yagura Station =

Railway station in Higashiagatsuma, Gunma Prefecture, Japan

Yagura Station 矢倉駅
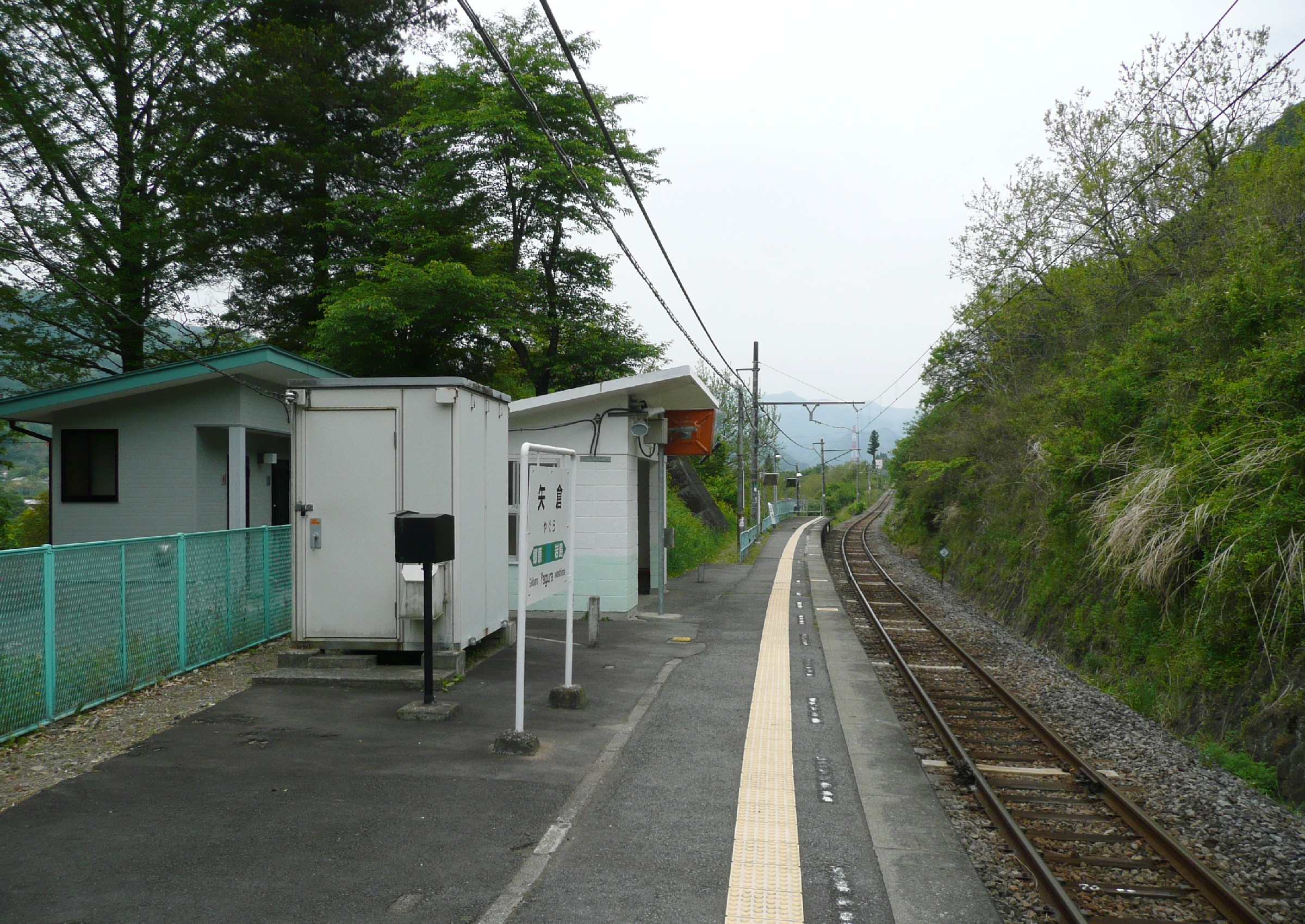
- Yagura Station in August 2007

General information
- Location: Yagura 686, Higashiagatsuma-machi, Agatsuma-gun, Gunma-ken 377-0816; Japan
- Coordinates: 36.5525°N 138.7844°E
- Operator: JR East
- Line: ■ Agatsuma Line
- Distance: 28.0 km from Shibukawa
- Platforms: 1 side platform

Other information
- Status: Unstaffed
- Website: Official website

History
- Opened: 10 November 1959

Passengers
- FY2011: 42

Services
Preceding station	JR East	Following station
Iwashima towards Ōmae	Agatsuma Line	Gōbara towards Takasaki
Location
- Location within Gunma Prefecture Location within Japan

Yagura Station (矢倉駅, Yagura-eki) is a passenger railway station in the town of Higashiagatsuma, Gunma Prefecture, Japan, operated by East Japan Railway Company (JR East).

== Lines ==
Yagura Station is a station on the Agatsuma Line, and is located 28.0 rail kilometers from the terminus of the line at Shibukawa Station.

== Station layout ==
The station is unmanned and perched on a mountain slope.

== History ==
Yagura Station was opened on 10 November 1959. The station was absorbed into the JR East network upon the privatization of the Japanese National Railways (JNR) on 1 April 1987.

== Surrounding area ==
- Iwashita Post Office

== See also ==
- List of railway stations in Japan
