= Shima Onsen =

Hot springs town

Shima Onsen 四万温泉
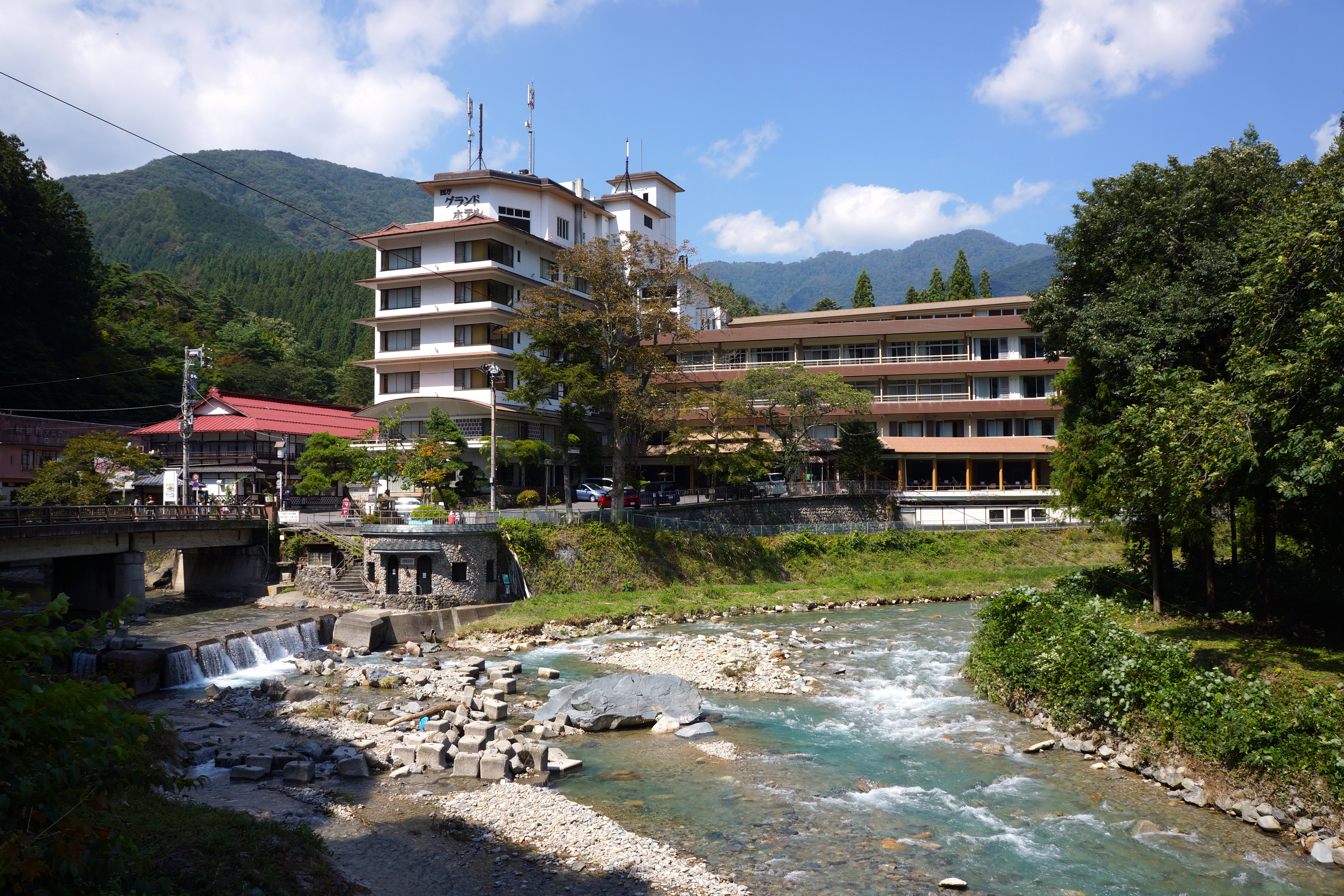
- Interactive map of Shima Onsen 四万温泉
- Location: Nakanojō, Gunma Prefecture, Japan
- Coordinates: 36°41′13″N 138°46′27″E

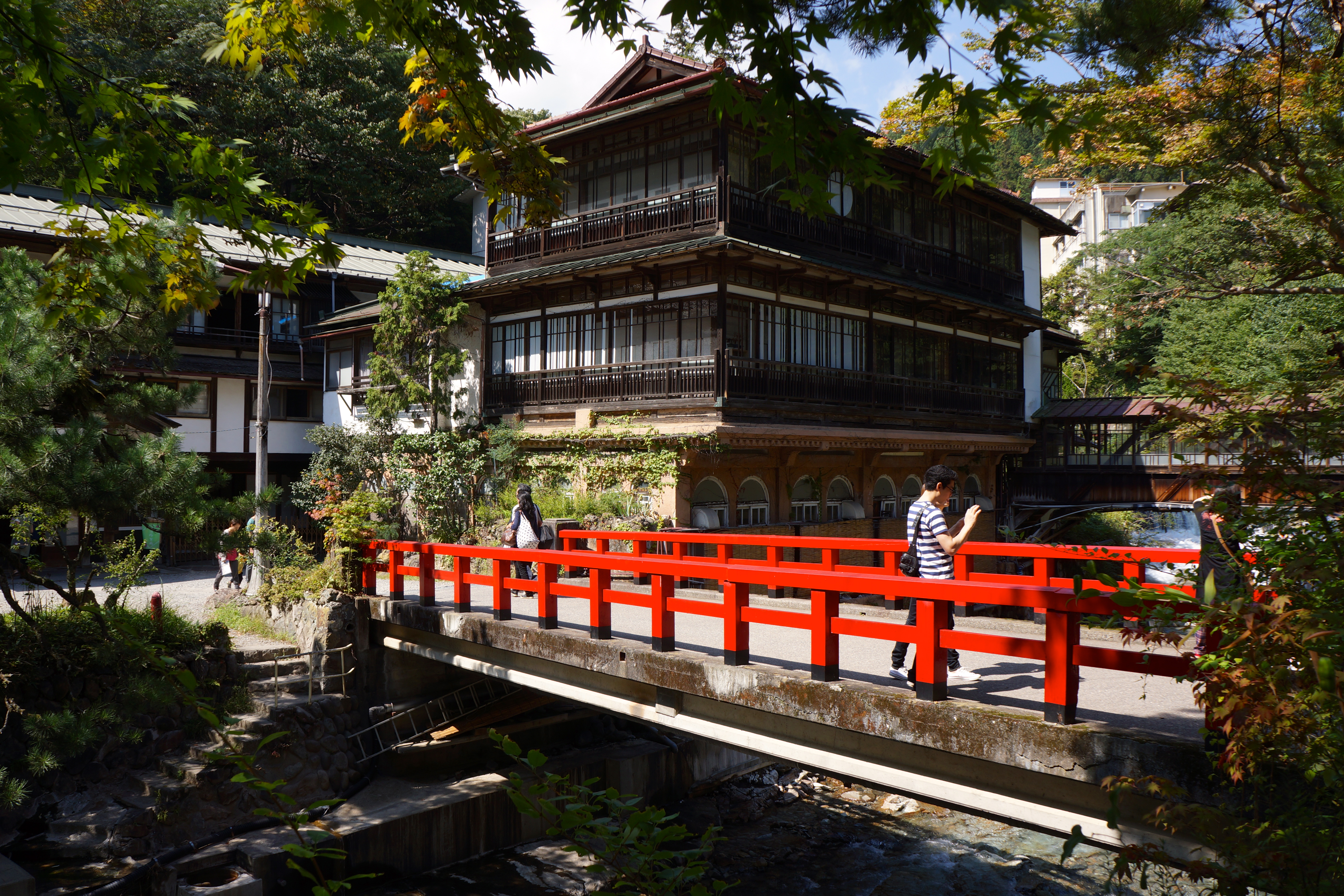

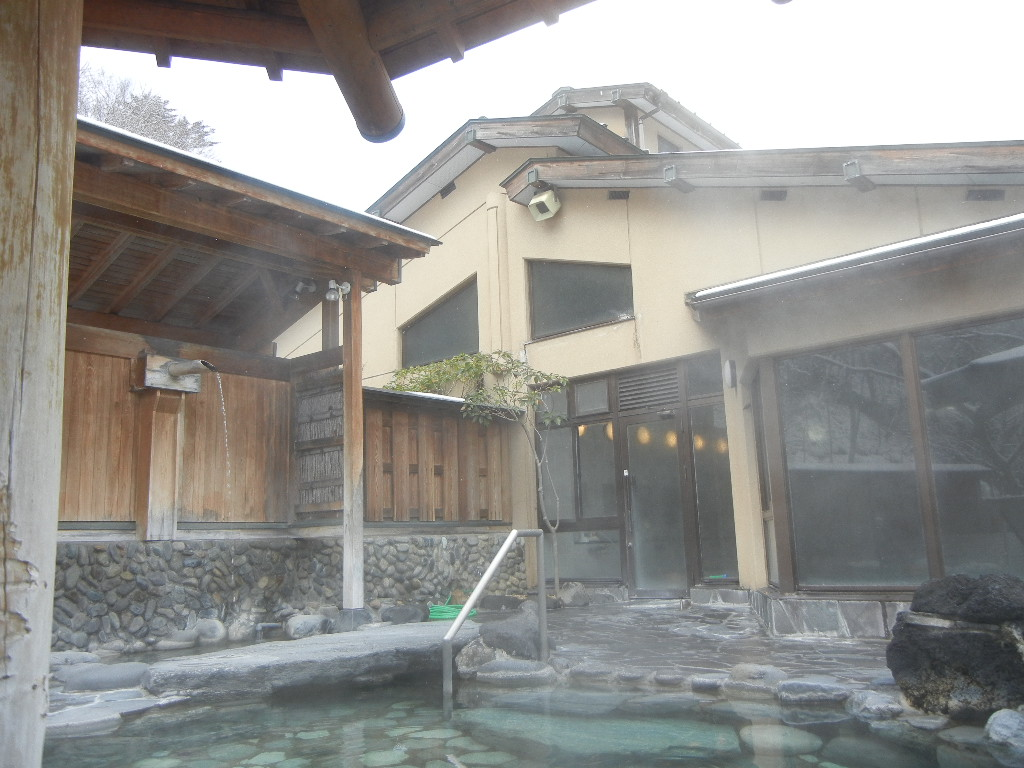
Onsen bath

Shima Onsen is a name of Japanese town and hot springs - onsen, the part of Nakanojō city in the Gunma Prefecture.

== Description ==
Shima Onsen is one of the oldest and most popular onsens in Japan. There are over 40 separate hot spring sources available in many ryokans and public bath houses. The town of Shima Onsen is located in the Shima river valley and is divided to 3 parts. The Japanese name means "40 thousand" indicating that the baths cure many diseases. Some of the hot springs facilities add salt to the mineral rich spring water.

The Shima Onsen is accessible by way of a rocky dirt trail, that has been used by people to access the hot springs for four hundred years. Some of the Onsen buildings are centuries old. The Sekizen-kan Honkan, constructed in 1691, is one of the oldest inns to be found in Japan. It has been designated and Important Cultural Asset.

== See also ==
- Shima Tamura
