= Gōbara Station =

Railway station in Higashiagatsuma, Gunma Prefecture, Japan

Gōbara Station 郷原駅
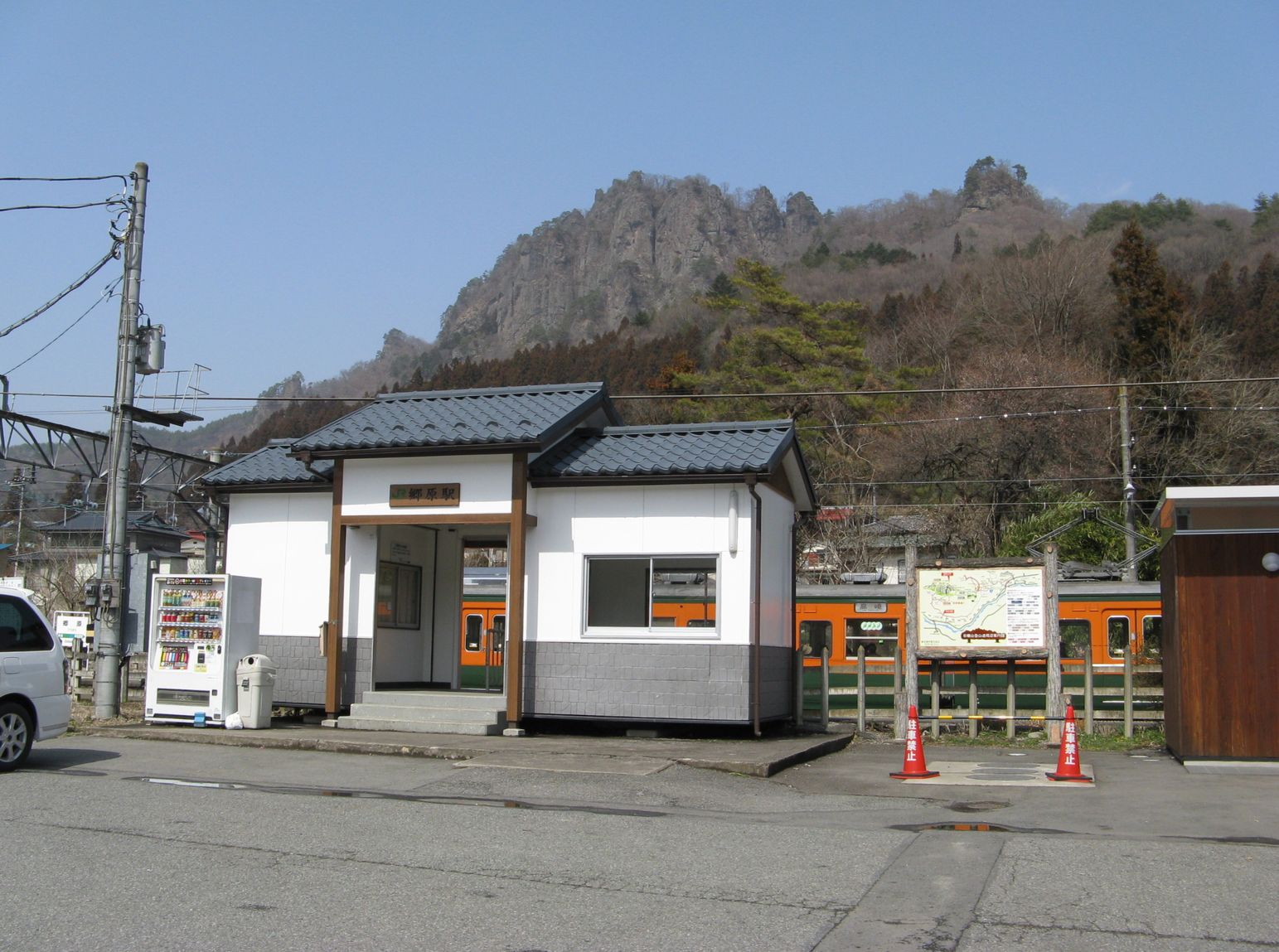
- Gōbara Station in April 2009

General information
- Location: Gōbara 607, Higashiagatsuma-machi, Agatsuma-gun, Gunma-ken 377-0811; Japan
- Coordinates: 36.5488°N 138.8012°E
- Operator: JR East
- Line: ■ Agatsuma Line
- Distance: 26.3 km from Shibukawa
- Platforms: 2 side platforms

Other information
- Status: Unstaffed
- Website: Official website

History
- Opened: 20 April 1946

Passengers
- FY2011: 86

Services
Preceding station	JR East	Following station
Yagura towards Ōmae	Agatsuma Line	Gunma-Haramachi towards Takasaki
Location
- Location within Gunma Prefecture Location within Japan

Gōbara Station (郷原駅, Gōbara-eki) is a passenger railway station in the town of Higashiagatsuma in Gunma Prefecture, Japan. The station, which is operated by the East Japan Railway Company, lies on the Agatsuma Line.

== Lines ==
Gōbara Station is a station on the Agatsuma Line, and is located 26.3 rail kilometers from the terminus of the line at Shibukawa Station.

== Station layout ==
The station consists of two opposed side platforms connected by a level crossing. The station is unattended.

=== Platforms ===
1	■ Agatsuma Line	for Naganohara-Kusatsuguchi, Manza-Kazawaguchi and Ōmae
2	■ Agatsuma Line	for Shibukawa and Takasaki

== History ==
Gōbara Station was opened on 20 April 1946. The station was absorbed into the JR East network upon the privatization of the Japanese National Railways (JNR) on 1 April 1987.

== Surrounding area ==
- site of Iwabitsu Castle

== See also ==
- List of railway stations in Japan
