= Azuma, Gunma (Agatsuma) =

Former village in Japan

Azuma (東村, Azuma-mura) was a village located in Agatsuma District, Gunma Prefecture, Japan. The village was established in 1889.

As of 2003, the village had an estimated population of 2,373 and a density of 70.94 persons per km^{2}. The total area was 33.45 km^{2}.

On March 27, 2006, Azuma, along with the town of Agatsuma (also from Agatsuma District), was merged to create the town of Higashiagatsuma.
