= Nakanojō, Gunma =

Nakanojō 中之条町
- Town
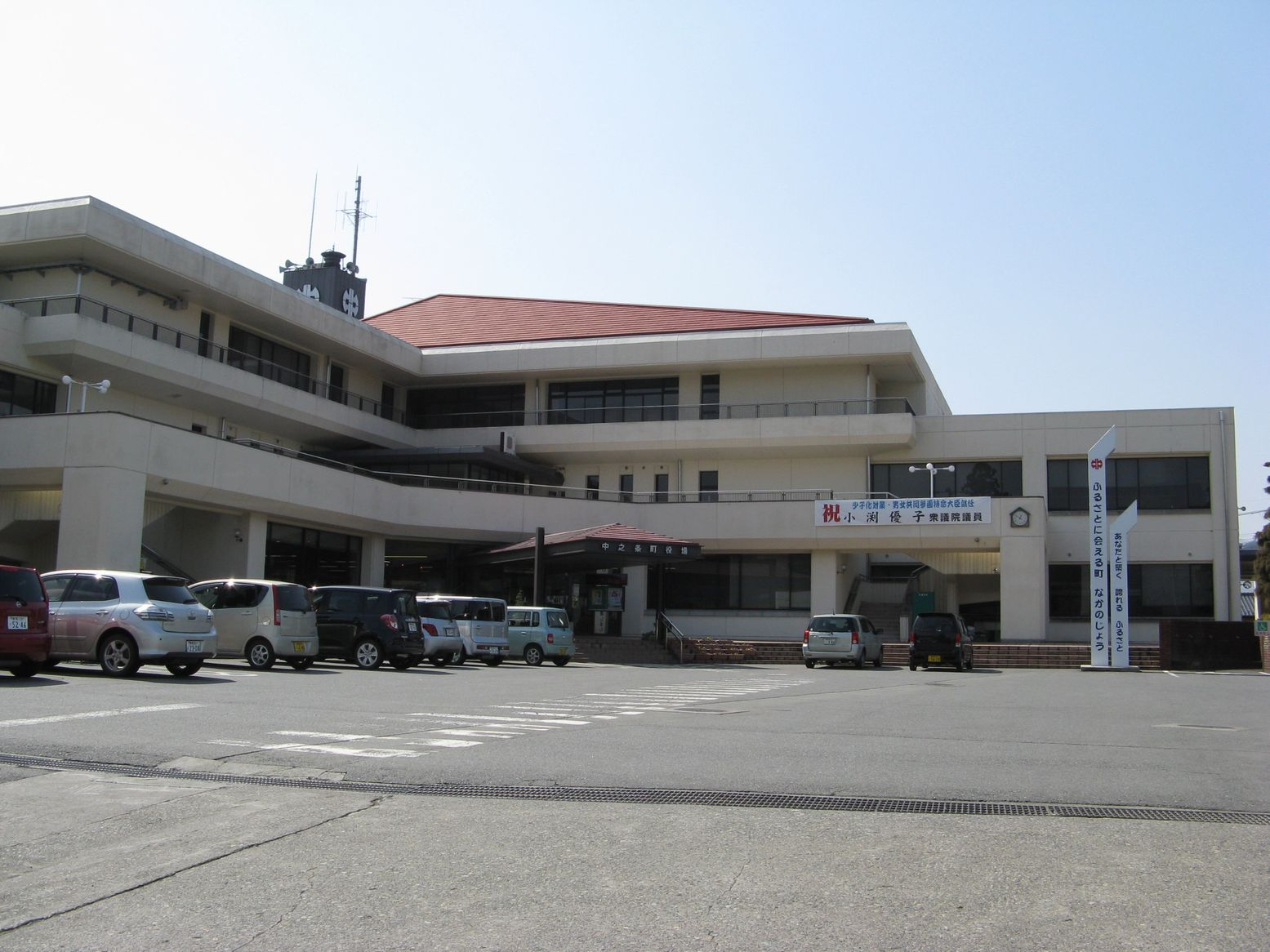
- Nakanojō town office

- Flag Seal

- Location of Nakanojō in Gunma Prefecture

- Coordinates: 36°35′23.4″N 138°50′27.6″E
- Country: Japan
- Region: Kantō
- Prefecture: Gunma
- District: Agatsuma

Area
  - Total: 439.28 km^{2} (169.61 sq mi)

Population (August 2020)
  - Total: 15,571
  - Density: 35.447/km^{2} (91.806/sq mi)
- Time zone: UTC+9 (Japan Standard Time)
- Phone number: 0279-75-2111
- Address: 1091 Nakanojō, Nakanojō-machi, Agatsuma-gun, Gunma-ken 377-0404
- Climate: Cfa
- Website: Official website
- Symbols
- Bird: Japanese bush warbler
- Flower: Mountain lily
- Tree: Keyaki

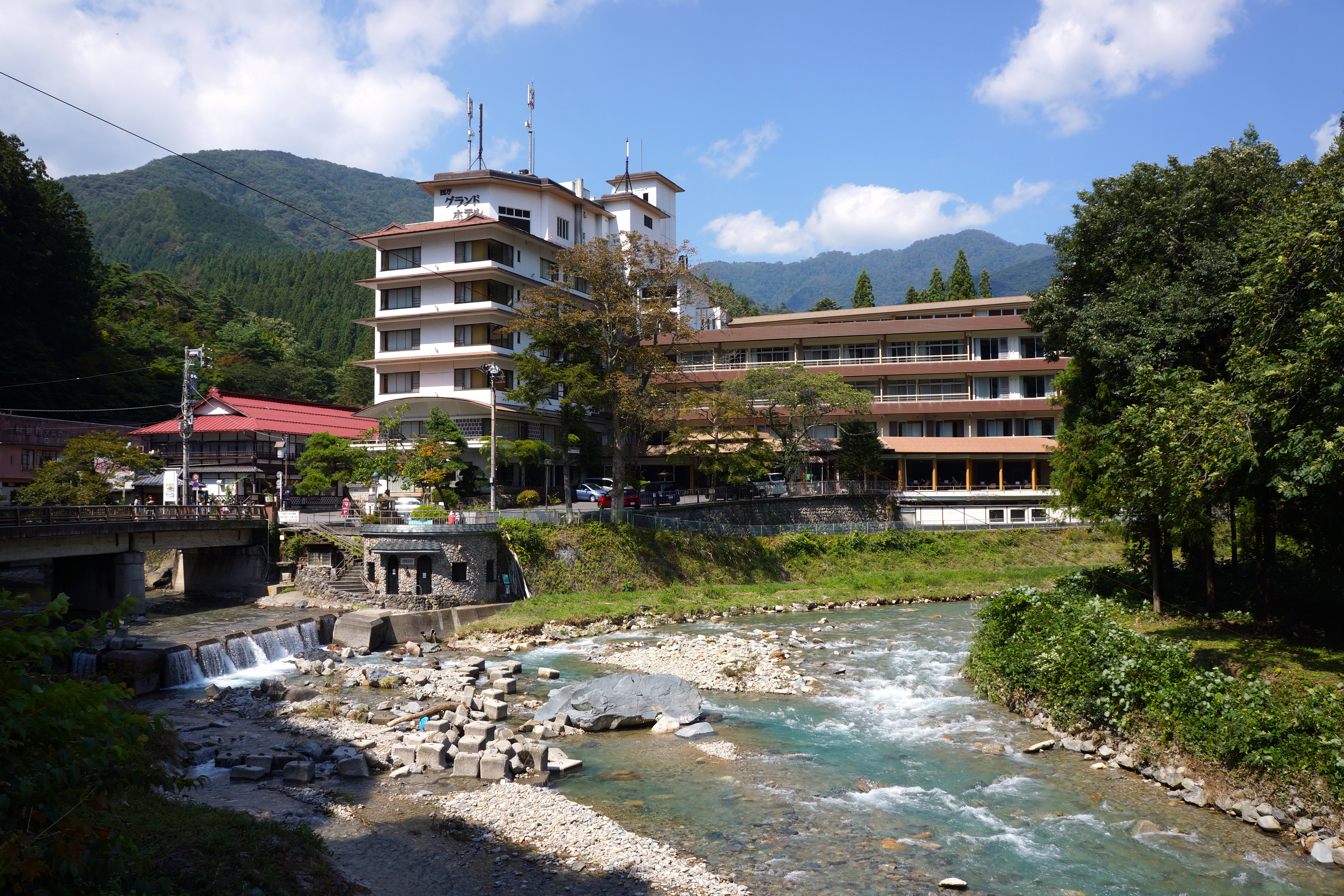
Shima Onsen

Nakanojō (中之条町, Nakanojō-machi) is a town located in Gunma Prefecture, Japan. As of 1 August 2020, the town had an estimated population of 15,571 in 6,737 households, and a population density of 35 persons per km^{2}. The total area of the town is 439.28 square kilometres (169.61 sq mi).

== Geography ==
Located in the northwestern portion of Gunma Prefecture, Nakanojō is surrounded by high peaks of over 1000 m in height, with the Agatsuma River passing through the center of town from west to east. The town has a mean elevation of 400 meters above sea level. The town's area is 83% mountains and forests (197 km^{2}).

- Rivers: Agatsuma River, Shima River
- Lakes: Shimagawa Dam

=== Surrounding municipalities ===
Gunma Prefecture

- Higashiagatsuma
- Kusatsu
- Minakami
- Naganohara
- Shibukawa

Nagano Prefecture

- Sakae
- Takayama
- Yamanouchi

Niigata Prefecture

- Yuzawa

=== Climate ===
Nakanojō has a humid subtropical climate (Köppen Cfa) characterized by hot summers and cold winters with heavy snowfall. The average annual temperature in Nakanojō is 8.5 °C. The average annual rainfall is 1489 mm with September as the wettest month. The temperatures are highest on average in August, at around 24.4 °C, and lowest in January, at around 0.2 °C.

Climate data for Nakanojō (1991−2020 normals, extremes 1977−present)
Month	Jan	Feb	Mar	Apr	May	Jun	Jul	Aug	Sep	Oct	Nov	Dec	Year
Record high °C (°F)	18.5 (65.3)	22.6 (72.7)	25.1 (77.2)	30.5 (86.9)	34.0 (93.2)	35.9 (96.6)	37.3 (99.1)	38.0 (100.4)	37.5 (99.5)	31.8 (89.2)	24.9 (76.8)	21.3 (70.3)	38.0 (100.4)
Mean daily maximum °C (°F)	7.0 (44.6)	7.9 (46.2)	11.4 (52.5)	17.3 (63.1)	22.4 (72.3)	25.2 (77.4)	29.1 (84.4)	30.3 (86.5)	25.8 (78.4)	20.2 (68.4)	14.9 (58.8)	9.8 (49.6)	18.4 (65.1)
Daily mean °C (°F)	0.4 (32.7)	1.2 (34.2)	4.8 (40.6)	10.5 (50.9)	15.9 (60.6)	19.8 (67.6)	23.7 (74.7)	24.6 (76.3)	20.4 (68.7)	14.2 (57.6)	7.8 (46.0)	2.7 (36.9)	12.2 (54.0)
Mean daily minimum °C (°F)	−4.6 (23.7)	−4.1 (24.6)	−1.0 (30.2)	4.1 (39.4)	9.8 (49.6)	15.3 (59.5)	19.7 (67.5)	20.6 (69.1)	16.4 (61.5)	9.5 (49.1)	2.4 (36.3)	−2.3 (27.9)	7.2 (45.0)
Record low °C (°F)	−11.9 (10.6)	−12.5 (9.5)	−12.1 (10.2)	−6.4 (20.5)	−0.7 (30.7)	5.2 (41.4)	11.8 (53.2)	10.8 (51.4)	5.3 (41.5)	−1.8 (28.8)	−5.7 (21.7)	−10.0 (14.0)	−12.5 (9.5)
Average precipitation mm (inches)	33.5 (1.32)	31.9 (1.26)	64.9 (2.56)	79.8 (3.14)	106.8 (4.20)	157.0 (6.18)	185.8 (7.31)	196.2 (7.72)	213.6 (8.41)	134.4 (5.29)	51.1 (2.01)	29.0 (1.14)	1,283.8 (50.54)
Average precipitation days (≥ 1.0 mm)	4.5	4.8	8.0	8.5	10.3	13.6	15.1	13.7	12.7	9.5	5.6	4.7	111
Mean monthly sunshine hours	176.1	175.4	193.4	187.5	187.5	143.8	143.0	163.8	125.1	142.1	157.0	170.4	1,963.6
Source: Japan Meteorological Agency

== Demographics ==
Per Japanese census data, the population of Nakanojō has declined steadily over the past 70 years.

Historical population
Year	Pop.	±%
1920	19,941	—
1930	20,866	+4.6%
1940	22,038	+5.6%
1950	27,014	+22.6%
1960	26,838	−0.7%
1970	23,389	−12.9%
1980	22,618	−3.3%
1990	21,627	−4.4%
2000	20,389	−5.7%
2010	18,216	−10.7%
2020	15,386	−15.5%

== Neighborhoods within Nakanojō ==
- Akasaka (赤坂)
- Aoyama (青山)
- Arigawa (蟻川)
- Daidou (大道)
- Gotanda (五反田)
- Ichishiro (市城)
- Ise-machi (伊勢町)
- Iwamoto (岩本)
- Nakuta (名久田)
- Orida (折田)
- Ōtsuka (大塚)
- Upper Sawatari (上沢渡)
- Lower Sawatari (下沢渡)
- Shima (四万)
- Taira (平)
- Tochikubo (栃窪)
- West Nakanojo (西中之条)
- Yamada (山田)

(former Kuni village)

- Akaiwa (赤岩)
- Hikage (日影)
- Iriyama (入山)
- Kosame (小雨)
- Ōshi (太子)

== History ==
During the Edo period, the area around Nakanojō was part of the hatamoto-administered territory within Kōzuke Province.

With the creation of the modern municipalities system after the Meiji Restoration on April 1, 1889, the town of Nakanojō was created within Agatsuma District of Gunma Prefecture. The villages of Isama, Sawada and Nakuta merged into Nakanojō on April 15, 1955.

On March 28, 2010, the village of Kuni, also from Agatsuma District, merged into Nakanojō.

== Government ==
Nakanojō has a mayor-council form of government with a directly elected mayor and a unicameral town council of 15 members. Nakanojō, collectively with the other municipalities in Agatsuma District, contributes two members to the Gunma Prefectural Assembly. In terms of national politics, the town is part of Gunma 5th district of the lower house of the Diet of Japan.

== Economy ==
The economy of Nakanojō is heavily dependent on seasonal tourism primarily in connection with its onsen hot spring resorts.

== Education ==
Nakanojō has two public elementary schools and two public middle schools operated by the town government, and one public high schools operated by the Gunma Prefectural Board of Education. The city also has one private middle school and one private high school. Gunma Prefecture also operates one special education school for the handicapped.

== Transportation ==
=== Railway ===
JR East – Agatsuma Line

- Nakanojō - Ichishiro

=== Highway ===
- National Route 145
- National Route 292
- National Route 353
- National Route 405

== Local attractions ==
The main draw of tourists to Nakanojō are the onsen (natural hot spring) resorts. There are two major hot spring resort areas within the town. The larger and more famous one is Shima Onsen, located in the mountains to the north of town. The name means "forty thousand", and represents the 40,000 ailments the water is supposed to cure. The other resort is called Sawatari Hot Springs.

=== Festivals and events ===
Nakanojō has three main festivals during the year. In winter, there is the Tori-oi Matsuri. This involves pounding on large drum all around town to scare birds (for good crops) or demons (for good luck) away for the new year. In summer, there is the Nakanojō Matsuri in August and the Ise-machi Matsuri in September. The Ise-machi Matsuri features the Yagibushi Folk Dance.

=== Melody road ===
When an automobile drives at 40 km/h over a special melody road section of Japan National Route 353 passing through Nakanojō, the vibrations will sound the tune "Always With Me" (Japanese title: いつも何度でも, Itsumo nando demo) from the feature animation Spirited Away.

== Notable people from Nakanojō ==
- Keizo Obuchi, former Prime Minister of Japan
- Yūko Obuchi, politician
