= Agatsuma, Gunma =

Agatsuma 吾妻町
- Former town
- Flag Emblem

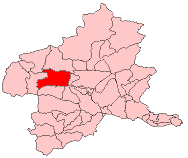
- Location of Agatsuma in Gunma Prefecture

- Location in Japan
- Coordinates: 36°34′17″N 138°49′32″E
- Country: Japan
- Region: Kantō
- Prefecture: Gunma Prefecture
- District: Agatsuma
- Merged: March 27, 2006 (now part of Higashiagatsuma)

Area
  - Total: 220.20 km^{2} (85.02 sq mi)

Population (April 1, 2005)
  - Total: 14,515
  - Density: 65.92/km^{2} (170.7/sq mi)
- Time zone: UTC+09:00 (JST)
- Symbols
- Bird: green pheasant
- Flower: narcissus
- Tree: zelkova serrata

Agatsuma (吾妻町, Agatsuma-machi) was a town located in Agatsuma District, Gunma Prefecture, Japan.

As of 2003, the town had an estimated population of 14,881 and a density of 67.58 persons per km^{2}. The total area was 220.20 km^{2}.

On March 27, 2006, Agatsuma, along with the village of Azuma (also from Agatsuma District), was merged to create the town of Higashiagatsuma.
