= Agatsuma District, Gunma =

District in Gunma prefecture, Japan

Coordinates: 36°34′N 138°49′E

Agatsuma District (吾妻郡, Agatsuma-gun) is a rural district located in Gunma Prefecture, Japan. As of January 2015, the district had an estimated population of 56,994 and an area of 1,278.55 km^{2}, with a population density of 44.6 people per square kilometer.

== Towns and villages ==
Agatsuma District
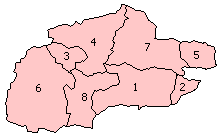

1. former Agatsuma (now part of Higashiagatsuma)
2. former Azuma (now part of Higashiagatsuma)
3. Kusatsu
4. former Kuni (now part of Nakanojō)
5. Takayama
6. Tsumagoi
7. Nakanojō
8. Naganohara

== History ==
The area of Agatsuma District was formerly part of Kōzuke Province, and per a census conducted at the start of the Meiji period, consisted of 42 villages administered as tenryō directly by the Tokugawa shogunate and four towns and 44 villages administered as hatamoto-territory, primarily by the Oguri-clan.

With the establishment of the municipality system on April 1, 1889, the area was organized into three towns (Nakanojō, Haramachi, and Naganohara) and ten villages

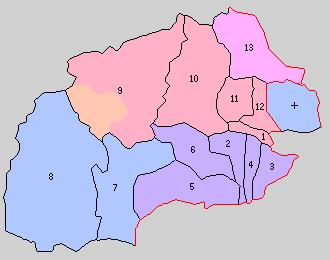
Historic Map of Agatsuma District in 1889: 1. Nakanojō, 2. Haramachi, 3. Azuma, 4. Ōta, 5. Sakaue, 6. Iwashima. 7. Naganohara, 8. Tsumagoi, 9. Kusatsu, 10. Sawada, 11.Isuma, 12.Nakuta, 13. Kuga

- 1896, April 1 – Takayama village was transferred from Nishigunma District to Agatsuma District; Kuga Village was transferred to Tone District
- 1900, July 1 – Kusatsu Village was reorganized into Kusatsu Town and Kuni Village
- 1955, March 1 – Ōta, Iwashima and Sakaue villages, and Haramachi (town) were merged into Agatsuma Town
- 1955, April 15 – Sawada, Isama and Nakuta villages were merged into Nakanojō Town
- 1956, February 1 – Hara Town was merged into Agatsuma Town
- 2006, March 27 – the town of Agatsuma, and the village of Azuma were merged to form the new town of Higashiagatsuma.
- 2010, March 28 – the village of Kuni merged into the town of Nakanojō.
