= Agatsuma River =

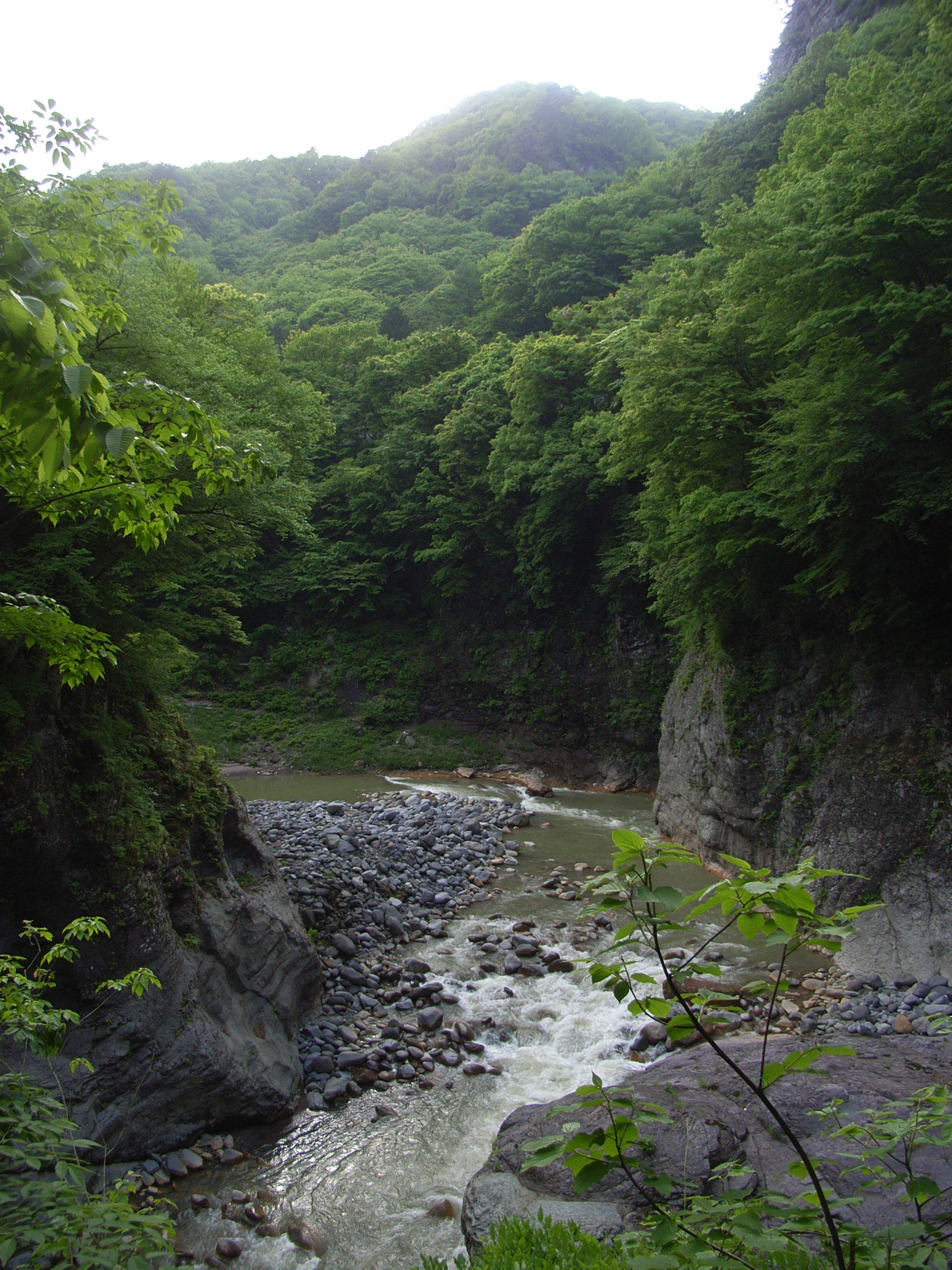
- Agatsuma River at Agatsuma Valley

- Native name: 吾妻川 (Japanese)

Location
- Country: Japan

Physical characteristics
- Source: Torii Pass
  - location: Border of Gunma with Nagano
  - coordinates: 36°29′20″N 138°23′53″E
  - elevation: 2,362 m (7,749 ft)
- Mouth: Tone River
  - location: Shibukawa, Gunma
  - coordinates: 36°30′00″N 139°00′58″E
  - elevation: 166 m (545 ft)
- Length: 76.22 km (47.36 mi)
- Basin size: 1,366 km^{2} (527 sq mi)

The Agatsuma River (吾妻川, Agatsuma-gawa) is a major river in the northern Kantō region of Japan. It is 76.22 kilometres (47.36 mi) in length and has a basin area of 1,366 square kilometres (527 sq mi). Located entirely within Gunma Prefecture, it is one of the prefecture's major rivers. It is also a major tributary of the Tone River. The river is an important source of hydroelectric power, and 17 power plants are located on its banks.

== Geography ==
The source of the Agatsuma River is Torii Pass (1,362 metres (4,469 ft) in altitude), on the border of Gunma and Nagano Prefectures. It gathers tributaries from Mount Asama and Mount Kusatsu-Shirane and flows into the Tone River in Shibukawa city. The Agatsuma River drains most of northwest Gunma Prefecture.

== Transportation ==
The East Japan Railway Company's Agatsuma Line (a single track line) runs along the river from Shibukawa Station in the east to the terminus at Omae Station in the west. Roughly divided into three sections, the river can be travelled by road using three National Highways: National Route 353 (in the east), National Route 145 (in the middle), and National Route 144 (in the west).
