= Kusatsu =

Kusatsu may refer to:

- Kusatsu, Shiga, a city in western Japan
  - Kusatsu Line, operated by JR West
  - MIO Biwako Kusatsu, local football club
- Kusatsu, Gunma, a town in eastern Japan
  - Kusatsu (train), operated by JR East
  - Thespakusatsu Gunma, local football club
- Kusatsu Onsen, a hot spring resort in Gunma Prefecture, Japan
- Clyde Kusatsu, Japanese American actor

== See also ==
- Kusatsu Station (disambiguation)
- Mount Kusatsu-Shirane, active stratovolcano in Kusatsu, Gunma, Japan
