= Kusatsu Onsen =

Hot springs resort in Gunma Prefecture, Japan

Coordinates: 36°38′18″N 138°35′36″E

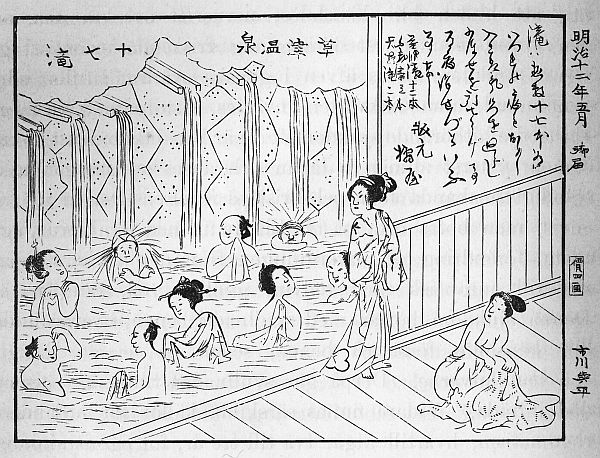
Bath in Kusatsu Onsen

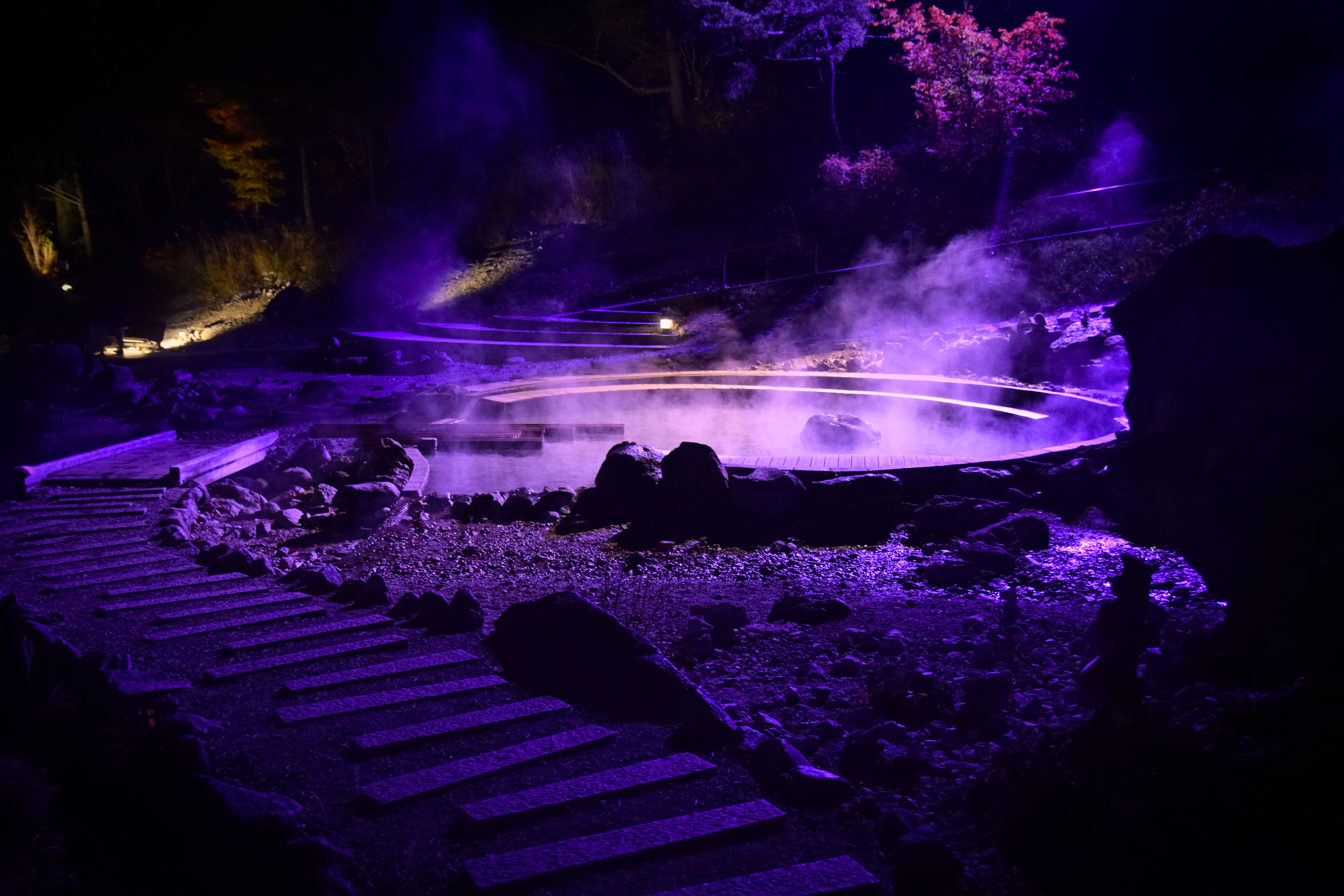
Kusatsu Onsen, a hot springs soaking pool

Kusatsu Onsen (草津温泉) is a hot spring resort located in Gunma Prefecture, Japan, northwest of Tokyo. It is a popular tourist destination.

There are 13 public baths at Kusatsu Onsen. The small bathhouses that are free for both town residents and tourists are managed by the townspeople themselves.

The source of its hot water is nearby Mount Kusatsu-Shirane and the appearance of the waters range from cloudy to clear, because the sources of the water that the baths rely upon are different.

The springs were known as a resort for centuries, but they became well known after the water was recommended for its health benefits by Erwin von Bälz, a German doctor who taught medicine at Tokyo University.

The locals claim the hot springs can cure all forms of ailments, other than lovesickness. Guests have claimed that pain disappears while soaking in its hot water.

== Gallery ==
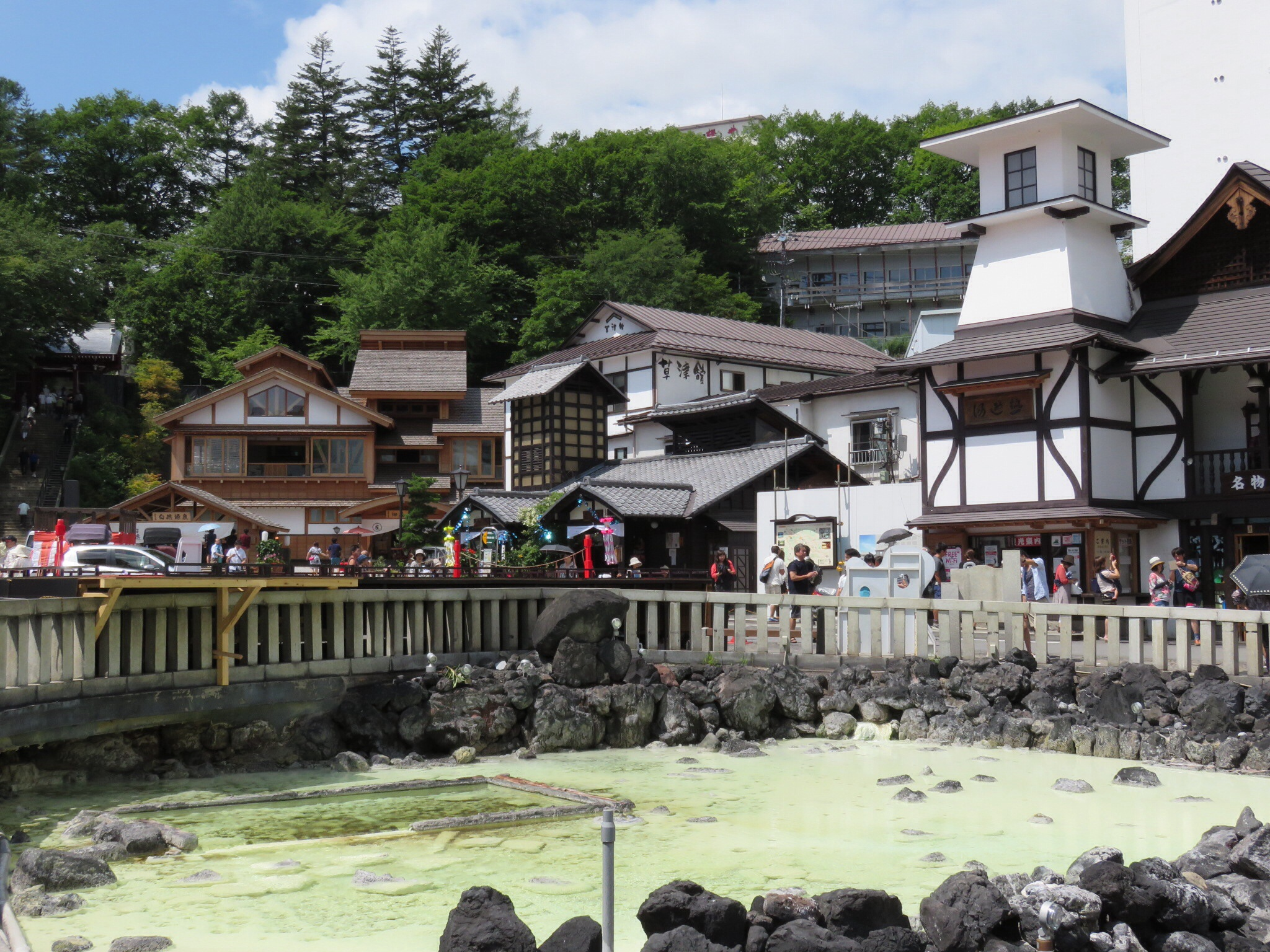

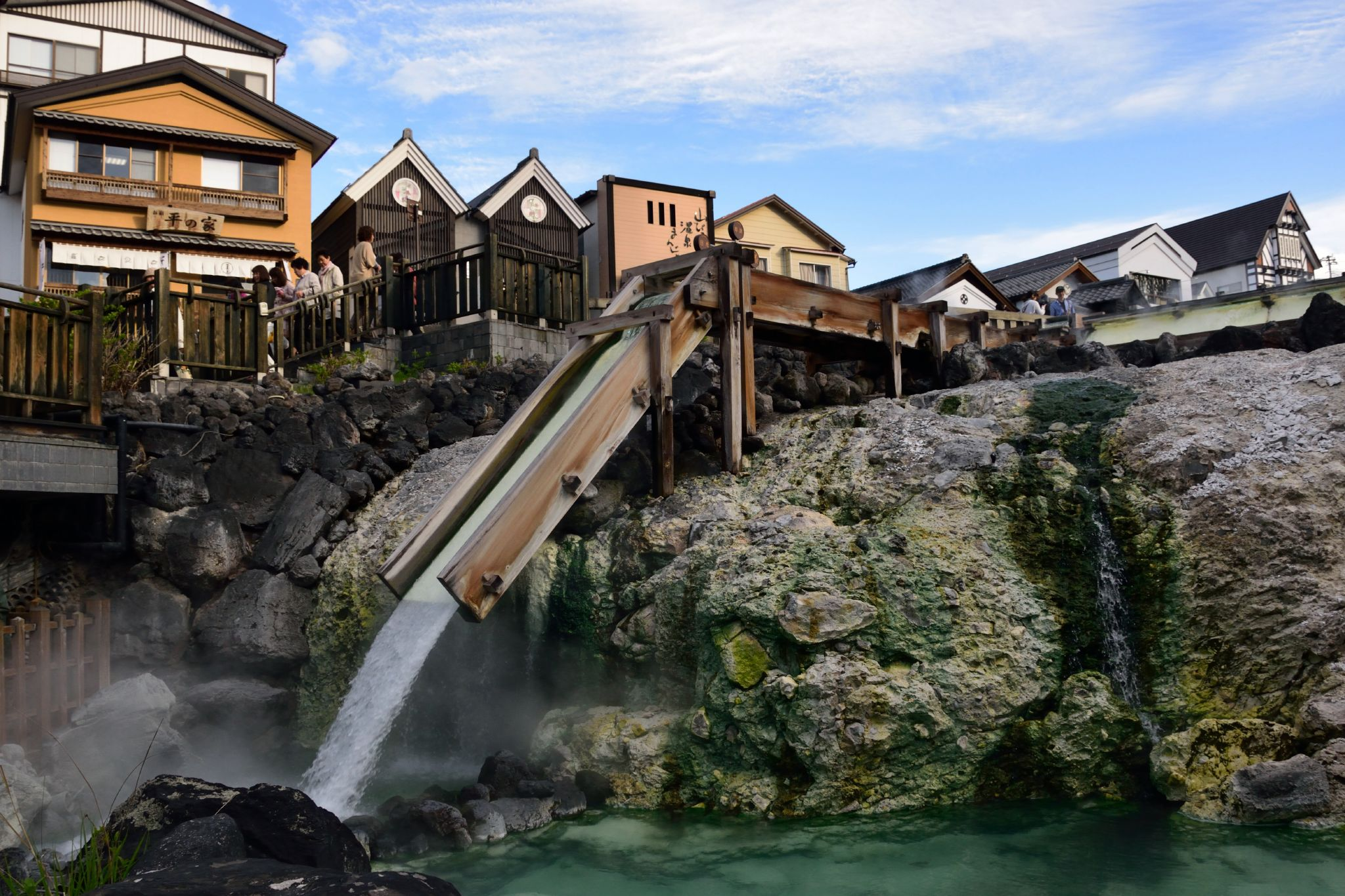

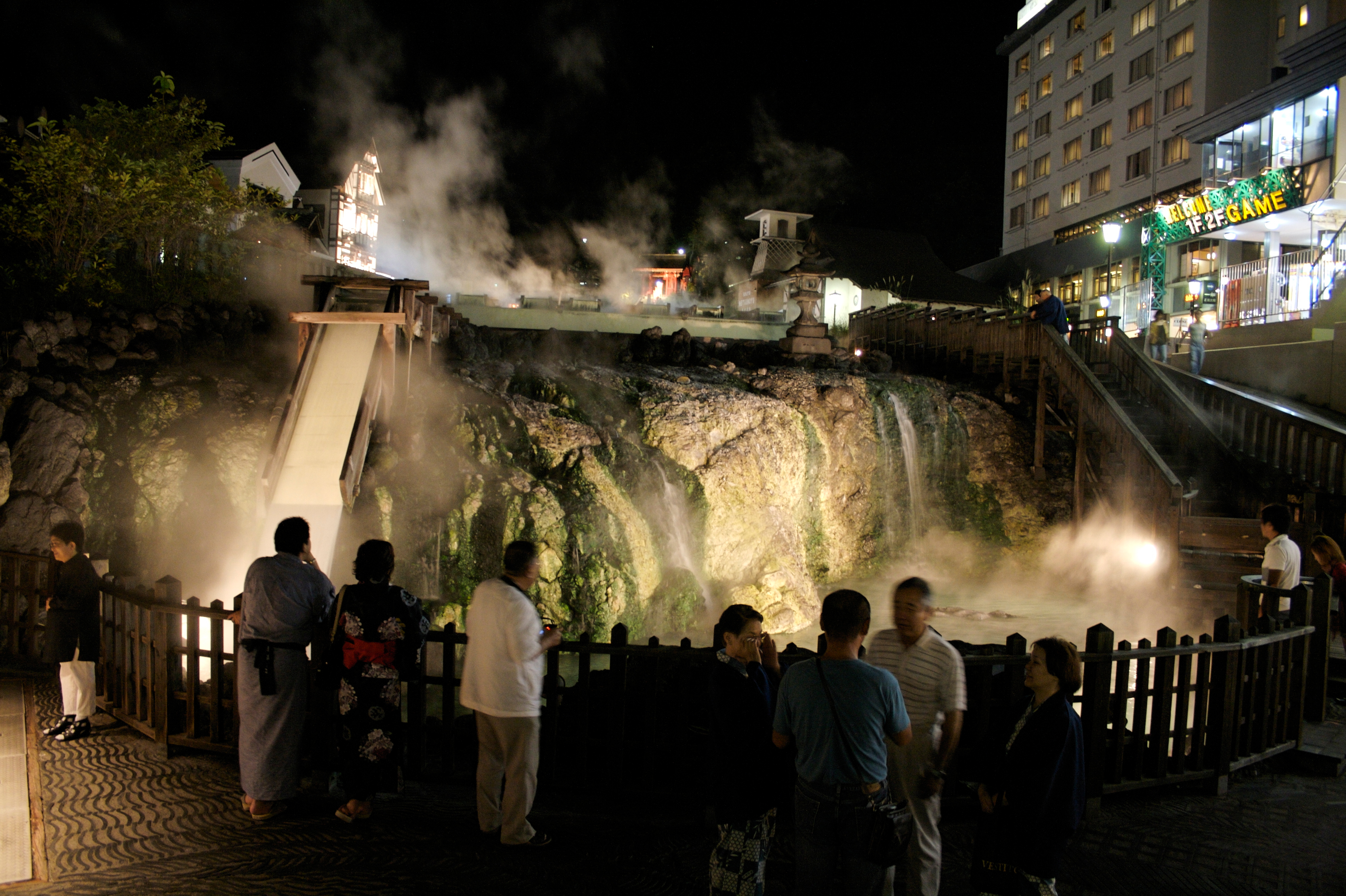

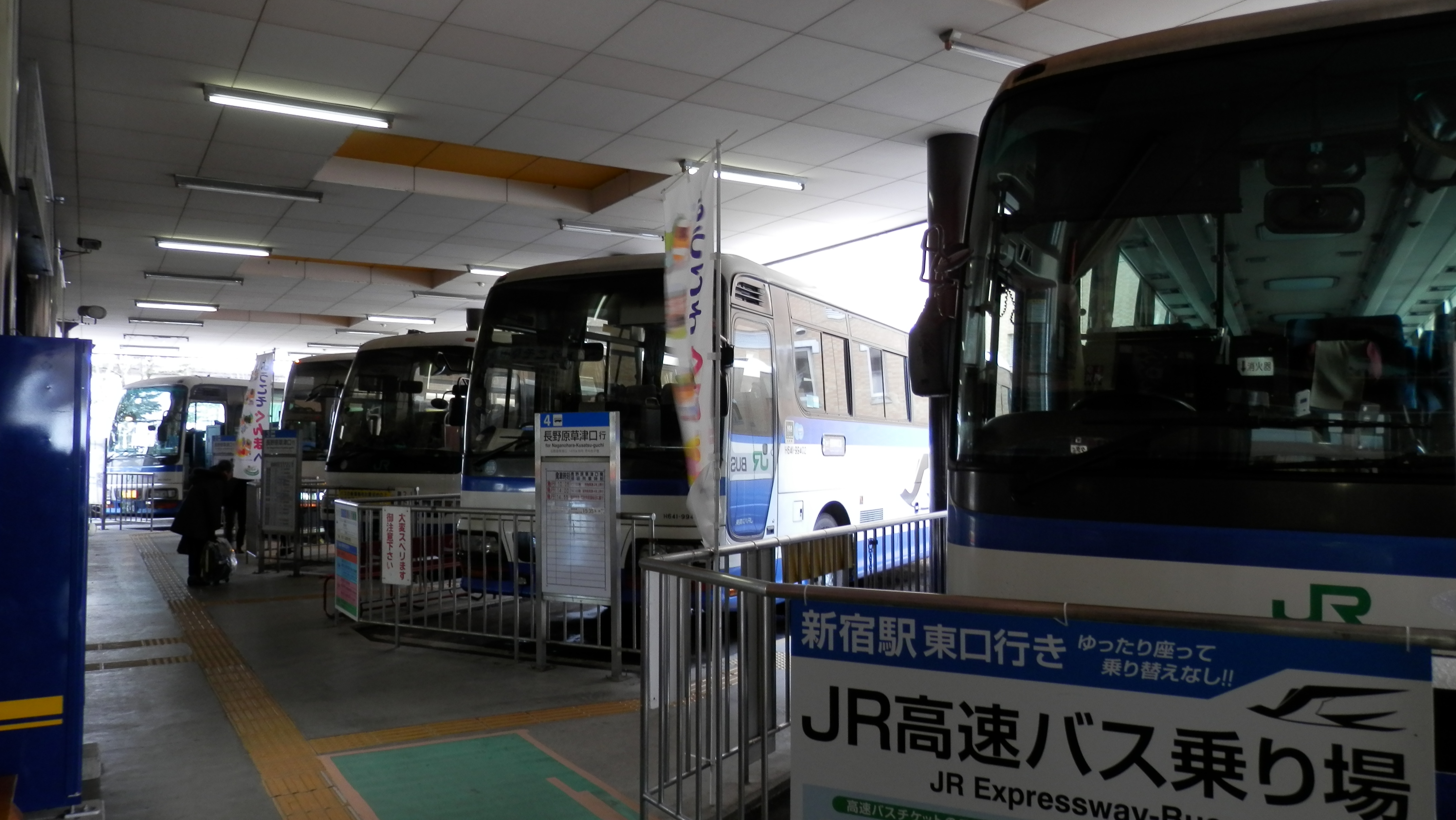

== Ground transportation ==
=== Buses ===
- Kusatsu Onsen Bus Terminal
  - Jōshū Yumeguri - 上州ゆめぐり号 from Shinjuku Station or Tokyo Station via Ikaho Onsen
  - Kusatsu Line - 草津線 from Naganohara-Kusatsuguchi Station

=== Railway ===
None

== See also ==
- List of hot springs in Japan
- List of hot springs in the world
