= Miyota Station =

Railway station in Miyota, Nagano Prefecture, Japan

Miyota Station 御代田駅
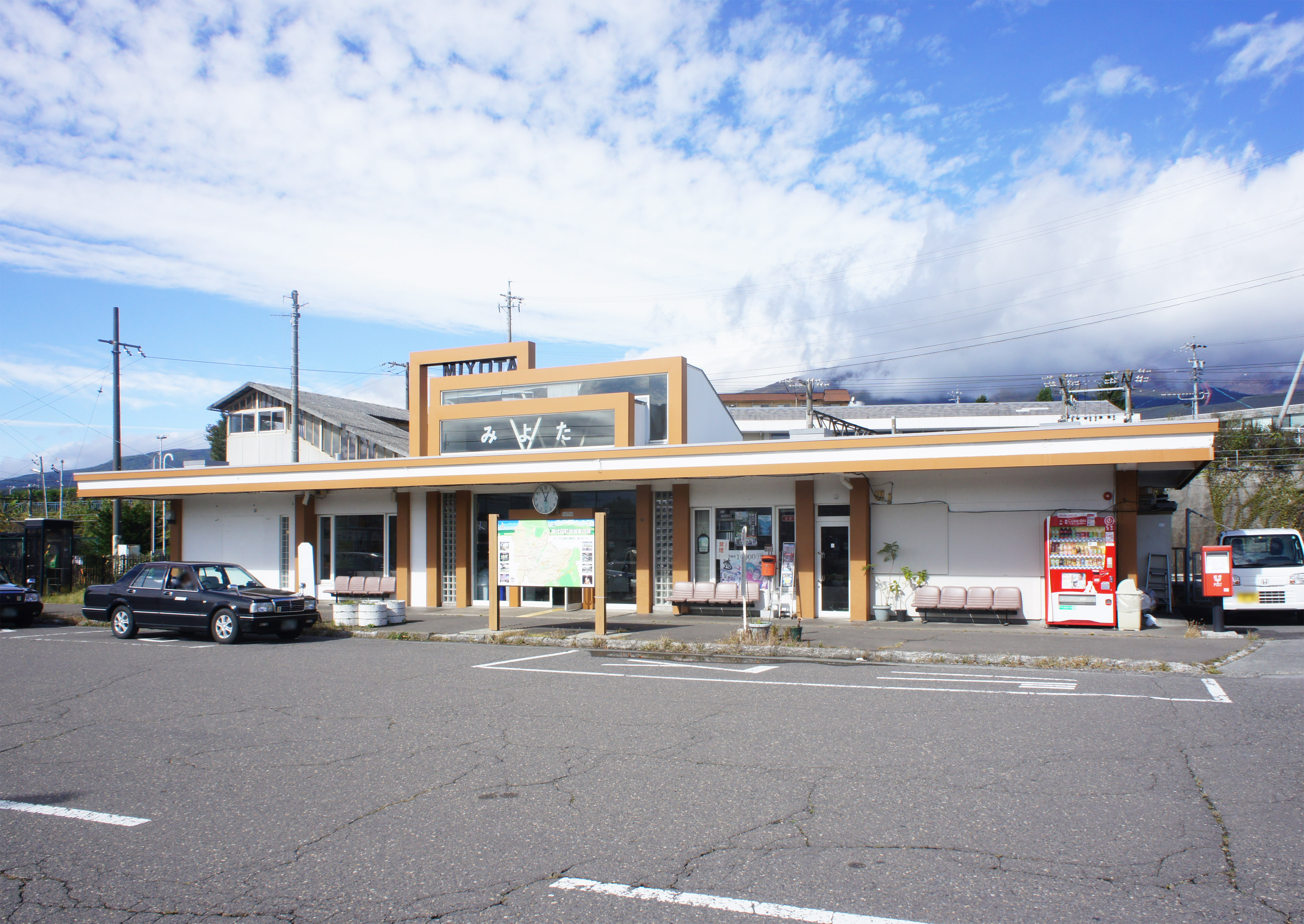
- Miyota Station in October 2021

General information
- Location: 2422 Miyota, Miyota-machi, Kitasaku-gun, Nagano-ken 389-0206; Japan
- Coordinates: 36.3192°N 138.5063°E
- Elevation: 819 m (2,687 ft)
- Operator: Shinano Railway
- Line: ■ Shinano Railway Line
- Distance: 13.2 km from Karuizawa
- Platforms: 2 side platforms
- Tracks: 2

Other information
- Status: Staffed
- Website: Official website

History
- Opened: 1 December 1888

Passengers
- FY2013: 1,286 daily
Location
- Location within Nagano Prefecture Location within Japan

Miyota Station (御代田駅, Miyota-eki) is a railway station on the Shinano Railway Line in the town of Miyota, Nagano, Japan, operated by the third-sector railway operating company Shinano Railway.

== Lines ==
Miyota Station is served by the 65.1 km Shinano Railway Line, and is 13.2 kilometers from the starting point of the line at Karuizawa Station.

== Station layout ==
The station consists of two ground-level opposed side platforms serving two tracks. The station is staffed.

=== Platforms ===
1	■ Shinano Railway Line	for Komoro, Ueda, and Nagano
2	■ Shinano Railway Line	for Karuizawa

== Adjacent stations ==
«	Service	»
Shinano Railway Line
Shinano-Oiwake	Local	Hirahara

== History ==
The station opened on 1 December 1888.

== Passenger statistics ==
In fiscal 2011, the station was used by an average of 1,286 passengers daily.

== Surrounding area ==
- Miyota Post Office

== See also ==
- List of railway stations in Japan
