= Shinano-Oiwake Station =

Railway station in Karuizawa, Nagano Prefecture, Japan

Shinano-Oiwake Station 信濃追分駅
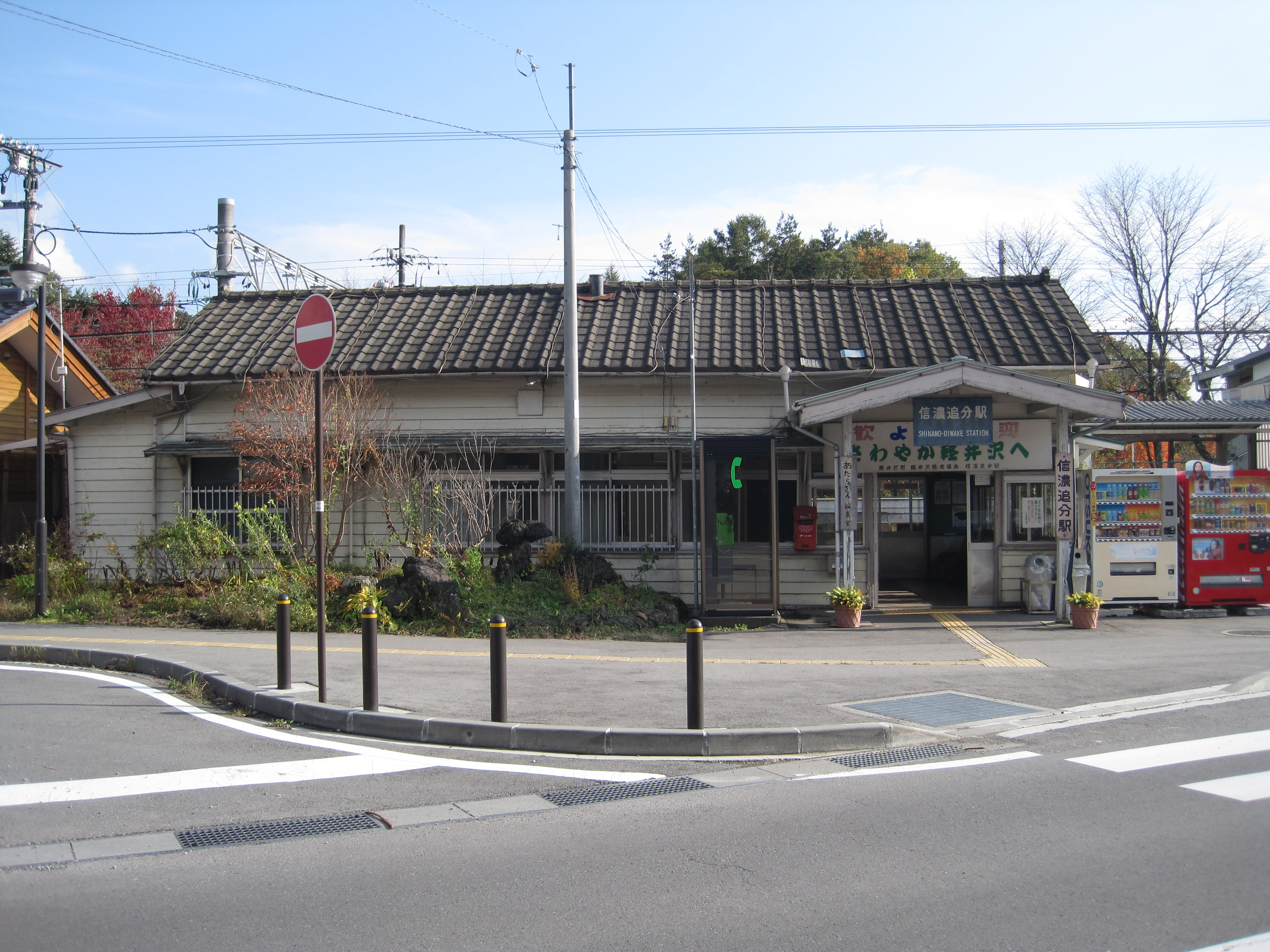
- Shinano-Oiwake Station in October 2013

General information
- Location: 1092 Oiwake, Karuizawa-machi, Kitasaku-gun, Nagano-ken 389-0115; Japan
- Coordinates: 36.3357°N 138.5586°E
- Elevation: 957 m (3,140 ft)
- Operator: Shinano Railway
- Line: ■ Shinano Railway Line
- Distance: 7.2 km from Karuizawa
- Platforms: 2 side platforms
- Tracks: 2

Other information
- Status: Unstaffed
- Website: Official website

History
- Opened: 1 October 1923

Passengers
- FY2011: 456 daily
Location
- Location within Nagano Prefecture Location within Japan

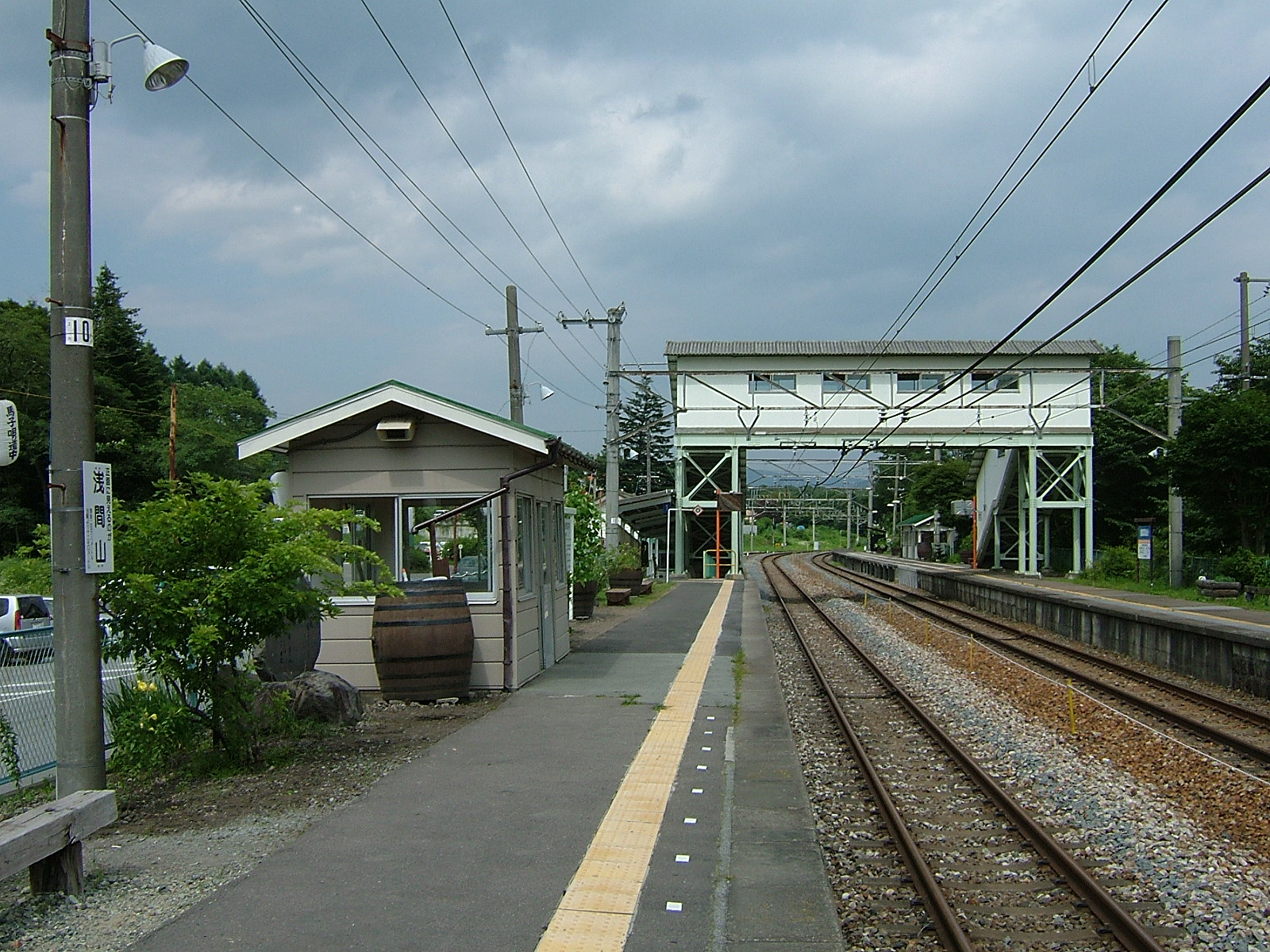
Tracks

Shinano-Oiwake Station (信濃追分駅, Shinano-Oiwake-eki) is a railway station on the Shinano Railway Line in Oiwake, in the town of Karuizawa, Nagano, Japan, operated by the third-sector railway operating company Shinano Railway.

== Lines ==
Shinano-Oiwake Station is served by the 65.1 km Shinano Railway Line, and is 7.2 kilometers from the starting point of the line at Karuizawa Station.

== Station layout ==
The station consists of two ground-level opposed side platforms serving two tracks, connected to the station building by a footbridge. The station is unattended.

=== Platforms ===
1	■ Shinano Railway Line	for Karuizawa
2	■ Shinano Railway Line	for Komoro, Ueda, and Nagano

== Adjacent stations ==
«	Service	»
Shinano Railway Line
Naka-Karuizawa	Local	Miyota

== History ==
The station opened on 1 October 1923.

== Passenger statistics ==
In fiscal 2011, the station was used by an average of 456 passengers daily.

== Surrounding area ==
- Site of Oiwake-juku

== See also ==
- List of railway stations in Japan
