= Kusatsu Onsen Bus Terminal =

Bus terminal in Kusatsu, Gunma, Japan

Kusatsu Onsen Bus Terminal 草津温泉バスターミナル
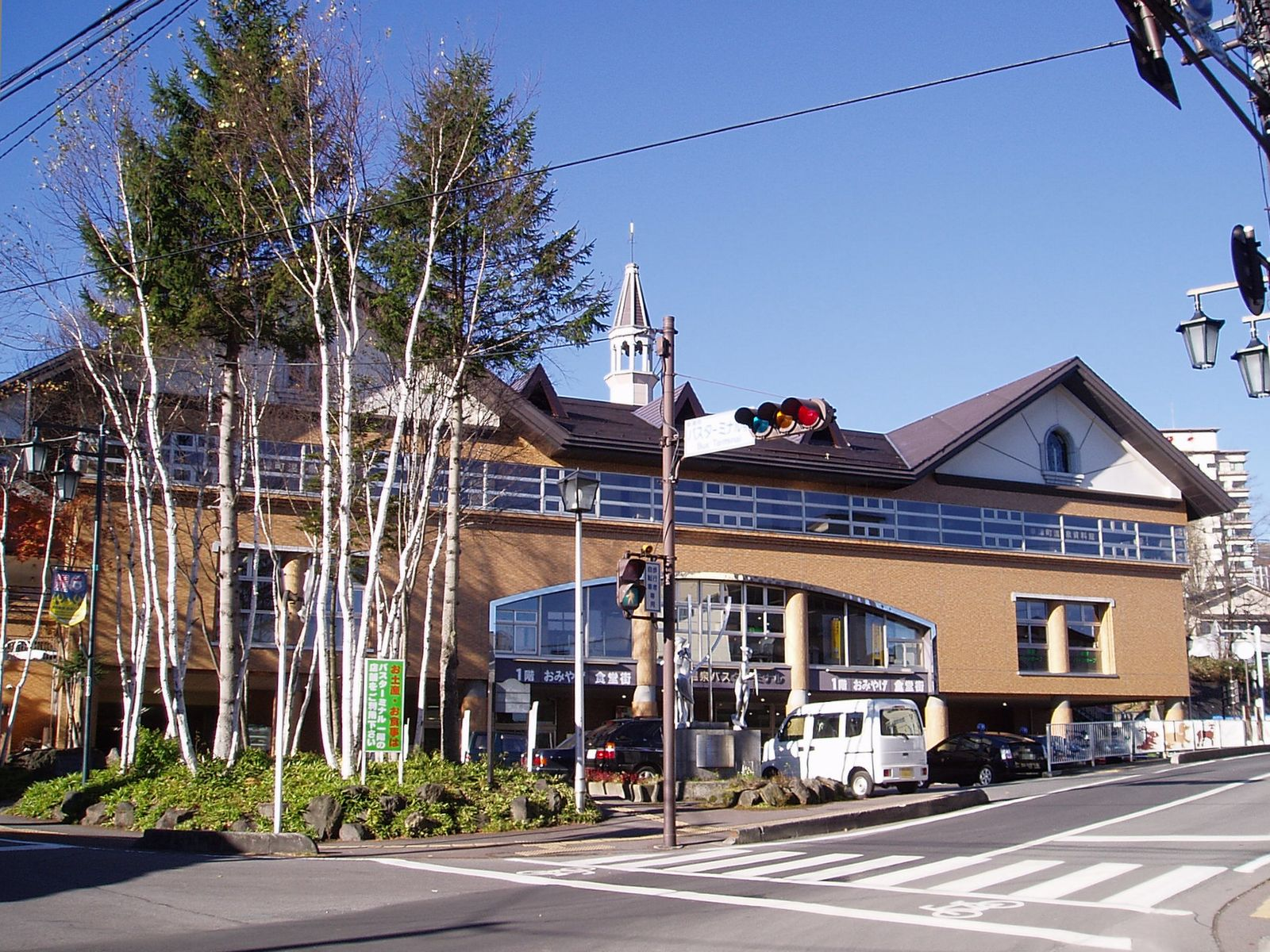

General information
- Other names: Kusatsu Onsen Station (草津温泉駅)
- Location: Kusatsu, Agatsuma District, Gunma Prefecture; Japan
- Coordinates: 36.620833°N 138.596444°E
- Operator: Kusatsu Bus Terminal Co. Ltd.
- Platforms: 9 bus bays (2nd floor)

Other information
- Website: Official website (in English)

History
- Opened: 11 December 1935
- Former names: Joshu Kusatsu Station (上州草津駅)
Location
- Location within Gunma Prefecture Location within Japan

Kusatsu Onsen Bus Terminal (Japanese: 草津温泉バスターミナル, Hepburn: Kusatsu Onsen Basu Tāminaru), or Kusatsu Onsen Station (草津温泉駅, Kusatsu Onsen-eki), is a bus terminal located near Kusatsu Onsen in the town of Kusatsu, Agatsuma District, Gunma Prefecture, Japan. It is managed by Kusatsu Bus Terminal Company in a joint venture between JR Bus and the Kusatsu municipal government. JR Bus, Seibu Bus, and Kusakaru Kotsu operate bus services at the terminal.

== History ==
From the Taishō era until World War II, many railway lines were constructed around Japan, though the country's acute topography led many bus routes to substitute train lines. The Joshu Kusatsu Line was one of many bus lines connecting Naganohara-Kusatsuguchi Station with Kusatsu Onsen, Yudanaka Station, Karuizawa Station, and Mount Kusatsu-Shirane.

The bus terminal was opened on 11 December 1935 as Joshu Kusatsu Station (上州草津駅, Jōshū Kusatsu-eki) with the commencement of bus service on the Joshu Kusara Line (上州草津線, Jōshū Kusatsu-sen) to Joshu Otsu Station (上州大津駅, Jōshū Ōtsu-eki) in Naganohara. The "Joshu" in the name was intended to avoid confusion with Kusatsu Station in Shiga Prefecture on the Tōkaidō Main Line.

The bus terminal was renamed to Kusatsu Onsen Station on 1 June 1962, following the closure of the Kusatsu Onsen train station.

== Station layout ==
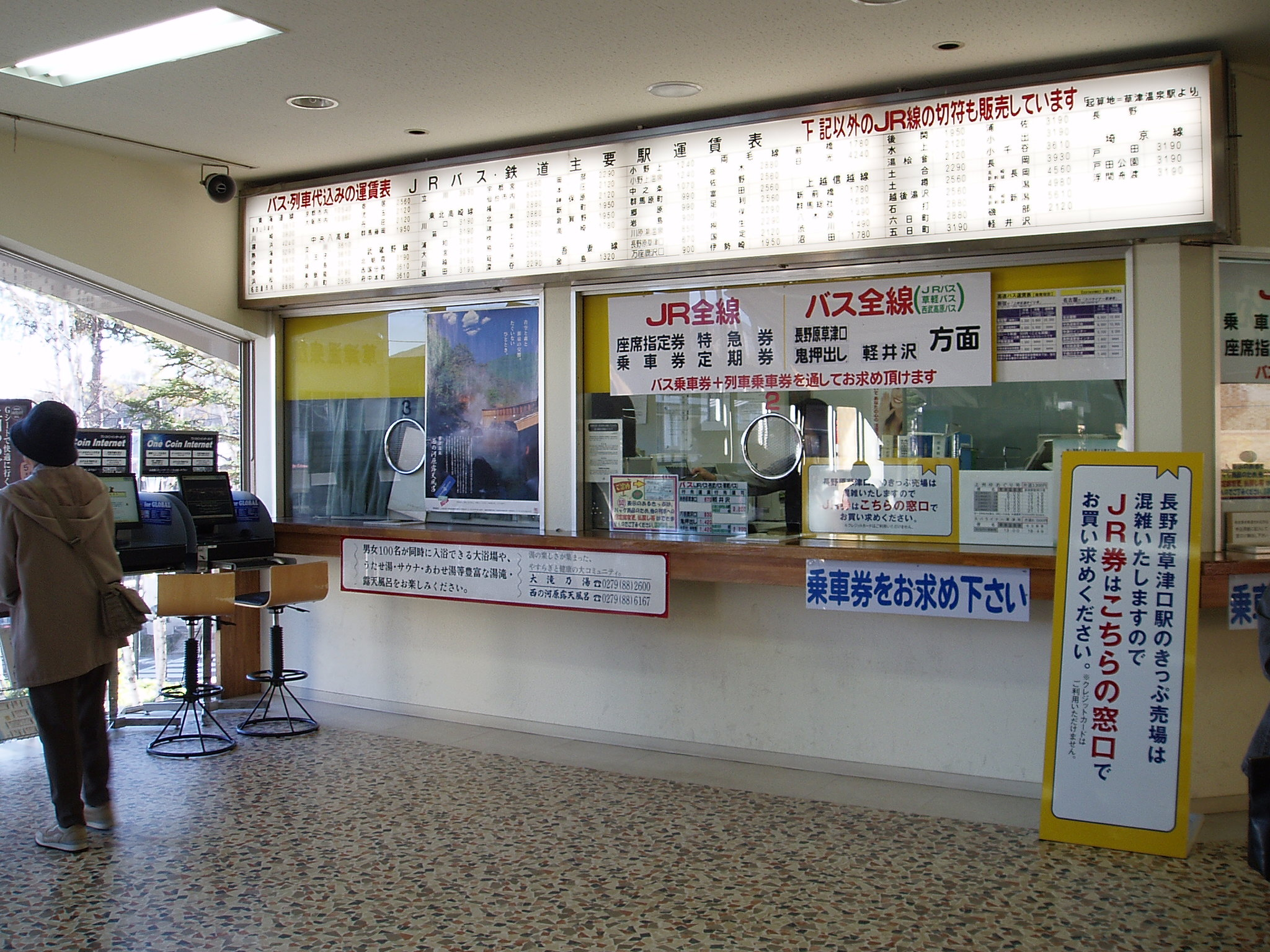
This is JR East MARS ticket office, which has been managed until 31st March 2026

The main concourse and gates (of which there are 9) are on the 2nd floor, along with ticket machine for buses to Karuizawa Station and Naganohara-Kusatsuguchi Station, internet terminals, vending machines, and a coffee and souvenir shop. There is a restaurant and tourist information desk on the 1st floor and a hot spring library on the 3rd floor.

== Bus services ==
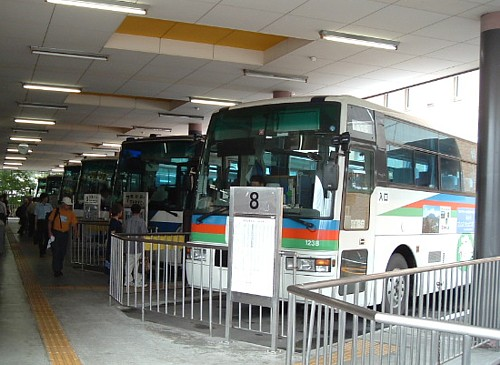
Buses in bus bays

Gate No.	Name	Intermediate stops	Terminal	Company	Note
1	Charter and express buses				
2, 3, 4	Kusatsu Line	Joshu Otsu	Naganohara-Kusatsuguchi Station	JR Bus Kanto	Passengers with a valid Japan Rail Pass are able to ride for free.
2, 3, 4	Kusatsu Yoitoko Liner		Kichijōji Station	Kanto Bus and Kan-etsu Kotsu	
5	Joshu Yumeguri expressway bus	Ikaho Onsen, Nerima Station, Shinjuku Highway Bus Terminal	Tokyo Station	JR Bus	
5	Tokyo Yumeguri expressway bus		Tokyo Station	JR Bus	
5	Shibuya-Karuizawa/Kusatsu Line expressway bus	Futako-tamagawa Station	Shibuya Station	Ueda Bus, Tokyu Transsés, Keio Bus	
5	Yokohama/Shin-Yokohama - Karuizawa/Kusatsu Line expressway bus	Shin-Yokohama Station, Yokohama Station	Tama-plaza Station	Ueda Bus, Tokyu Bus, Sotetsu Bus	
5	Tamagawa-josui/Tachikawa Line expressway bus	Tamagawa-Jōsui Station	Tachikawa Station	Chikuma Bus	
5	Blue Liner Kusatsu Onsen expressway bus	Takasaki Station, Kawagoe Station	Ōmiya Station (Saitama)	Koei Kotsu	
5	Dts Line expressway bus	Yashio Station, Ōsaki Station	Bus Terminal Tokyo Yaesu	Dts creation	At Yashio Station, passengers are able to transfer onto Shirakobato (bound for Narita International Airport and operated by Tobu Bus Central), or Tsukuba (bound for Tsukuba Station and operated by Kantō Railway).
6	Shirane-kazan Line	Sesshōkawara	Shirane-kazan	Kusakaru Kotsu, JR Bus Kanto	Suspended during winter. Passengers with a valid Japan Rail Pass are able to ride for free, with the exception of Kusakaru Kotsu-operated services.
6	Express Bus	Shirane-kazan, Shibu Toge	Nagano Station	Nagano Electric Railway	Suspended in winter.
6	Asama Shirane-kazan Line	Manza-Kazawaguchi Station	Karuizawa Station	Seibu Kankō Bus	
7	Karuizawa Sennoiri Kusatsu Line	Shirane-kazan, Manzaonsen, Manza-Kazawaguchi Station, Onioshidashi-en	Karuizawa Station	Seibu Bus	
7	Express Kusakaru Line	Kita-Karuizawa Station	Karuizawa Station	Kusakaru Kotsu	
7	Kusakaru Hospital Line	Nishi-Agatsuma Welfare Hospital	Karuizawa Station	Kusakaru Kotsu	Bound for Kita-Karuizawa Station during winter.
7	Asama Shirane-kazan Line	Manza-Kazawaguchi Station, Sennoiri	Karuizawa Station	Seibu Kankō Bus	
8, 9	Kusatsu Onsen town buses	Circular route	Kusatsu Onsen Bus Terminal	JR Bus Kanto	Fares at a flat rate of 100 yen.

== Former train station ==
Kusatsu Onsen Station 草津温泉駅
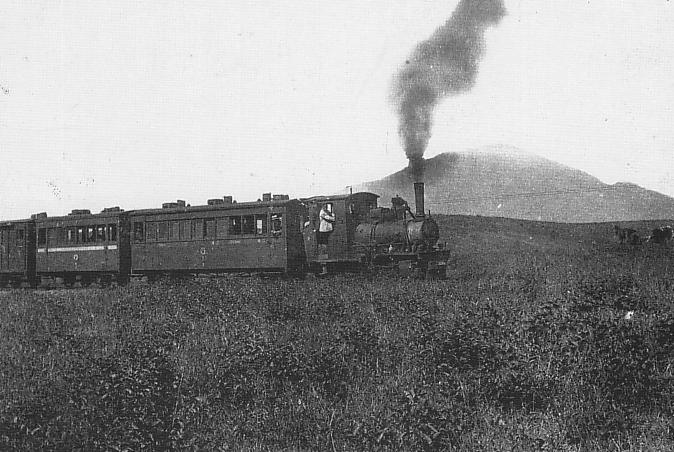
- A Kusatsu Electric Railway train

General information
- Location: Kusatsu, Agatsuma District, Gunma Prefecture; Japan
- Operator: Kusakaru Electric Railway
- Line: Kusakaru Electric Railway Line
- Connections: Bus stop

History
- Opened: 19 September 1926
- Closed: 1 February 1962
Location

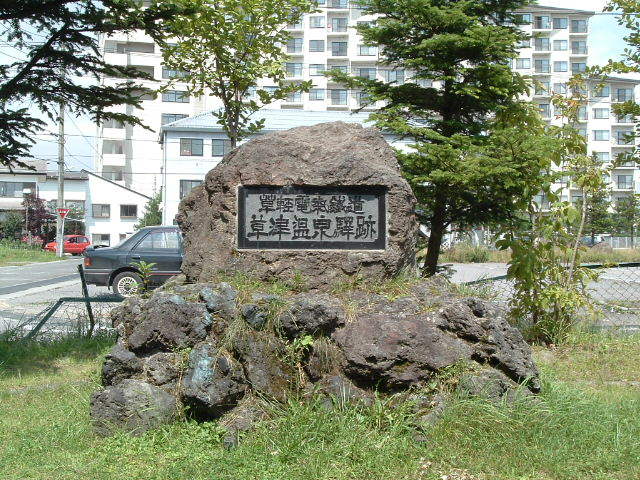
The site of the former Kusatsu Onsen Station

Located approximately 400 m (0.25 mi) south of the current Kusatsu Onsen Bus Terminal, the original Kusatsu Onsen Station (草津温泉駅, Kusatsu Onsen-eki) was a train station on the Kusakaru Electric Railway Line that operated from 1926 through 1962. The site of the former station has since been turned into a park, with a monument dedicated to the station.
