= Hirahara Station =

Railway station in Komoro, Nagano Prefecture, Japan

Hirahara Station 平原駅
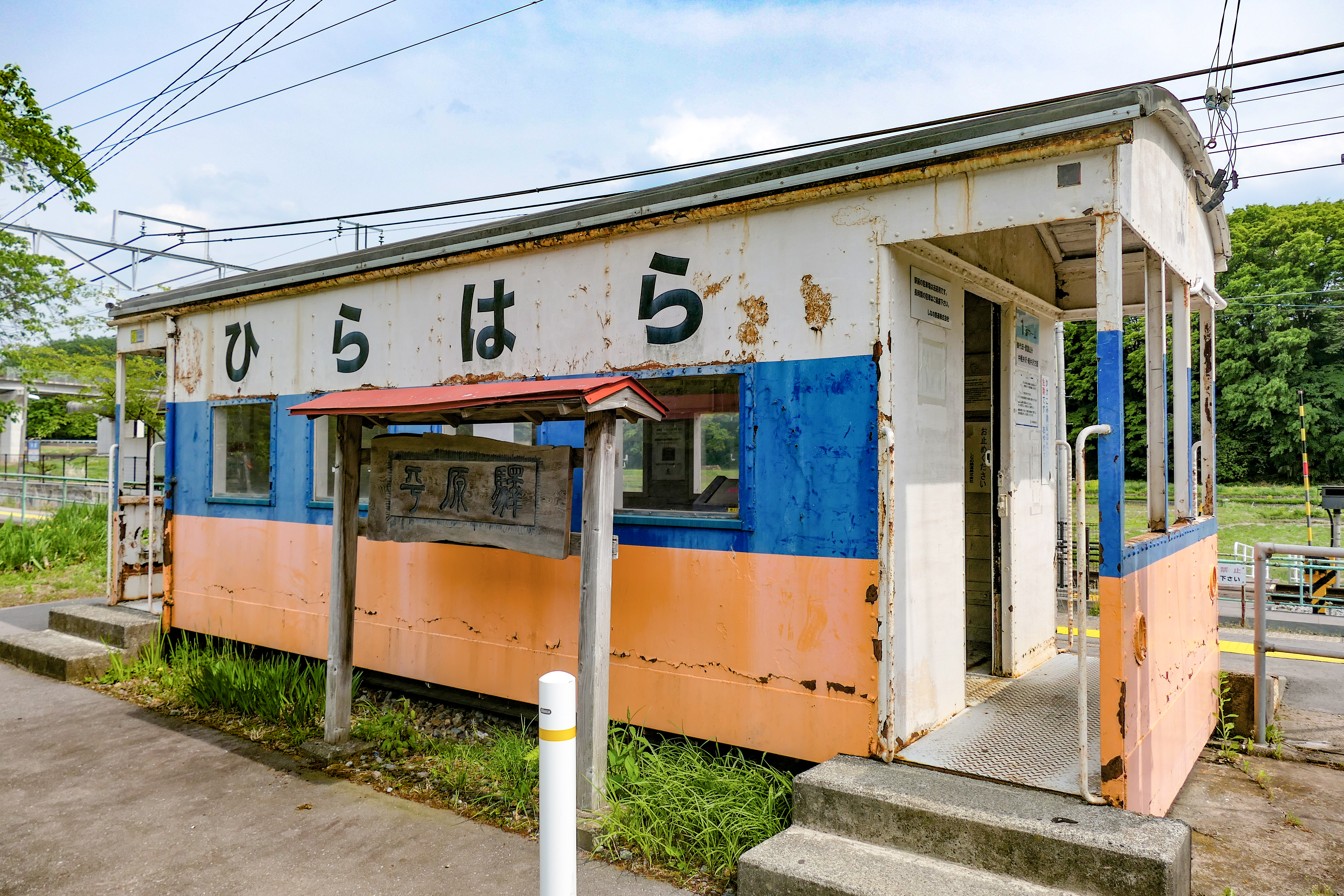
- Hirahara Station in May 2022

General information
- Location: 603 Hirahara, Komoro-shi Nagano-ken 384-0092; Japan
- Coordinates: 36°18′31.38″N 138°27′13.75″E
- Elevation: 706 m (2,316 ft)
- Operator: Shinano Railway
- Line: ■ Shinano Railway Line
- Distance: 18.3 km from Karuizawa
- Platforms: 1 island platform
- Tracks: 2

Other information
- Status: Unstaffed
- Website: Official website

History
- Opened: 10 January 1952

Passengers
- FY2011: 146 daily
Location
- Location within Nagano Prefecture Location within Japan

Hirahara Station (平原駅, Hirahara-eki) is a railway station on the Shinano Railway Line in the city of Komoro, Nagano, Japan, operated by the third-sector railway operating company Shinano Railway.

== Lines ==
Hirahara Station is served by the 65.1 km Shinano Railway Line, and is 18.3 kilometers from the starting point of the line at Karuizawa Station.

== Station layout ==
The station consists of one ground-level island platform serving two tracks, connected to the station building by a level crossing. The station is unattended.

=== Platforms ===
1	■ Shinano Railway Line	for Karuizawa
2	■ Shinano Railway Line	for Ueda, Komoro, and Nagano

== Adjacent stations ==
«	Service	»
Shinano Railway Line
Miyota	Local	Komoro

== History ==
The station opened on 10 January 1952.

== Passenger statistics ==
In fiscal 2011, the station was used by an average of 146 passengers daily.

== Surrounding area ==
- Mitsuoka Station

== See also ==
- List of railway stations in Japan
