= Naka-Karuizawa Station =

Railway station in Karuizawa, Nagano Prefecture, Japan

Naka-Karuizawa Station 中軽井沢駅
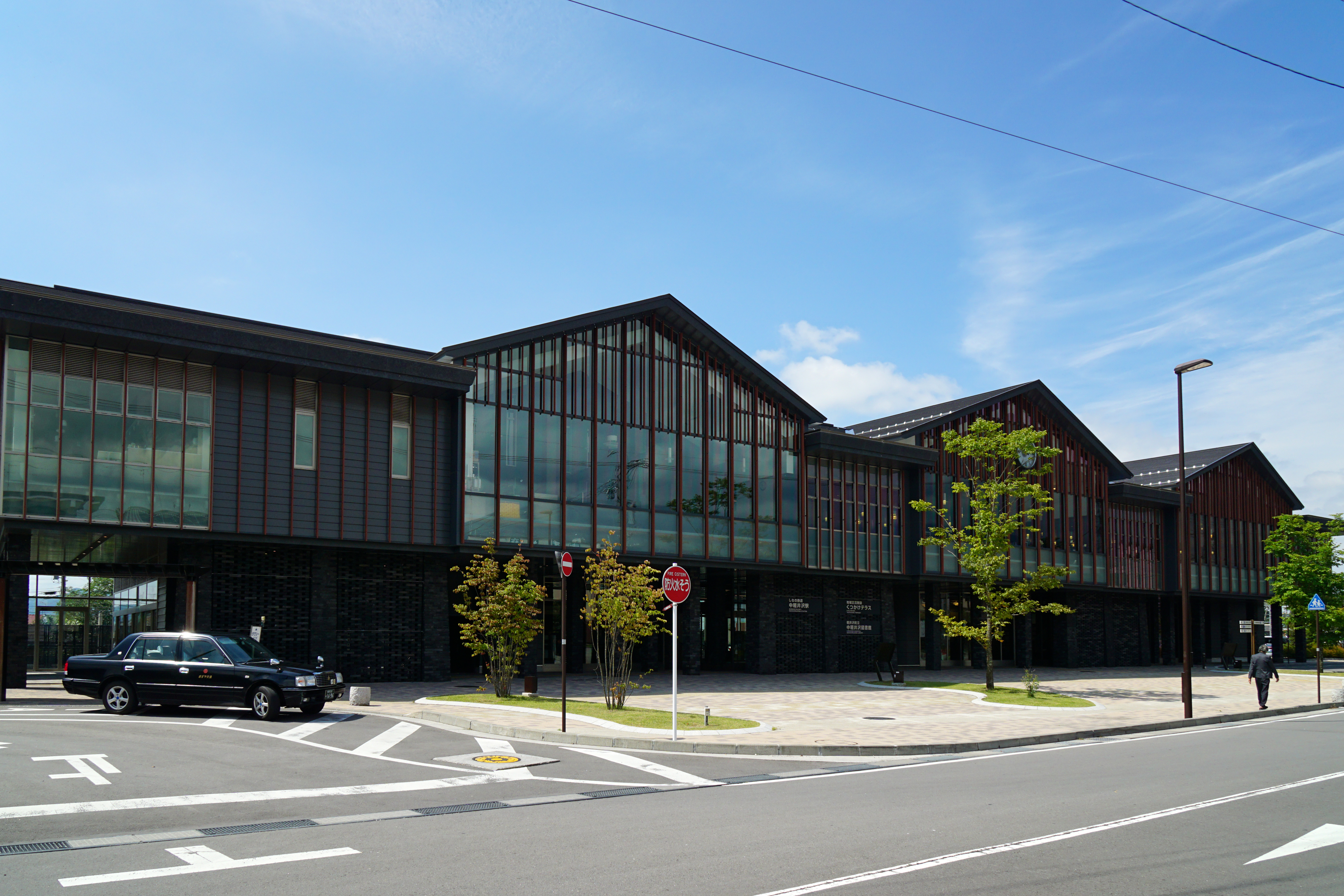
- Naka-Karuizawa Station in July 2016

General information
- Location: 3037-2 Nagakura, Karuizawa-machi, Kitasaku-gun, Nagano-ken 389-0111; Japan
- Coordinates: 36.3476°N 138.5933°E
- Elevation: 938 m (3,077 ft)
- Operator: Shinano Railway
- Line: ■ Shinano Railway Line
- Distance: 4.0 km from Karuizawa
- Platforms: 2 side platforms
- Tracks: 2

Other information
- Status: Staffed
- Website: Official website

History
- Opened: 15 July 1910
- Former names: Kutsukake Station (until 1956)

Passengers
- FY2011: 933 daily
Location
- Location within Nagano Prefecture Location within Japan

Naka-Karuizawa Station (中軽井沢駅, Naka-Karuizawa-eki) is a railway station on the Shinano Railway Line in Nagakura, in the town of Karuizawa, Nagano, Japan, operated by the third-sector railway operating company Shinano Railway.

== Lines ==
Naka-Karuizawa Station is served by the Shinano Railway Line and is 4.0 kilometers from the starting point of the line at Karuizawa Station.

== Station layout ==
The station consists of two opposed side platforms serving two tracks, with an elevated station building. The station is staffed.

=== Platforms ===
1	■ Shinano Railway Line	for Karuizawa
2	■ Shinano Railway Line	for Komoro, Ueda, and Nagano

== Adjacent stations ==
«	Service	»
Shinano Railway Line
Karuizawa	Local	Shinano-Oiwake

== History ==
The station opened on 15 July 1910 as Kutsukake Station (沓掛駅). It was renamed Naka-Kuruizawa on 10 April 1956.

== Passenger statistics ==
In fiscal 2011, the station was used by an average of 933 passengers daily.

== Surrounding area ==
- Kazuizawa Town Hall
- National Route 18

== See also ==
- List of railway stations in Japan
