= Kita-Karuizawa Station =

Railway station in Naganohara, Gunma Prefecture, Japan

Kita-Karuizawa Station 北軽井沢駅
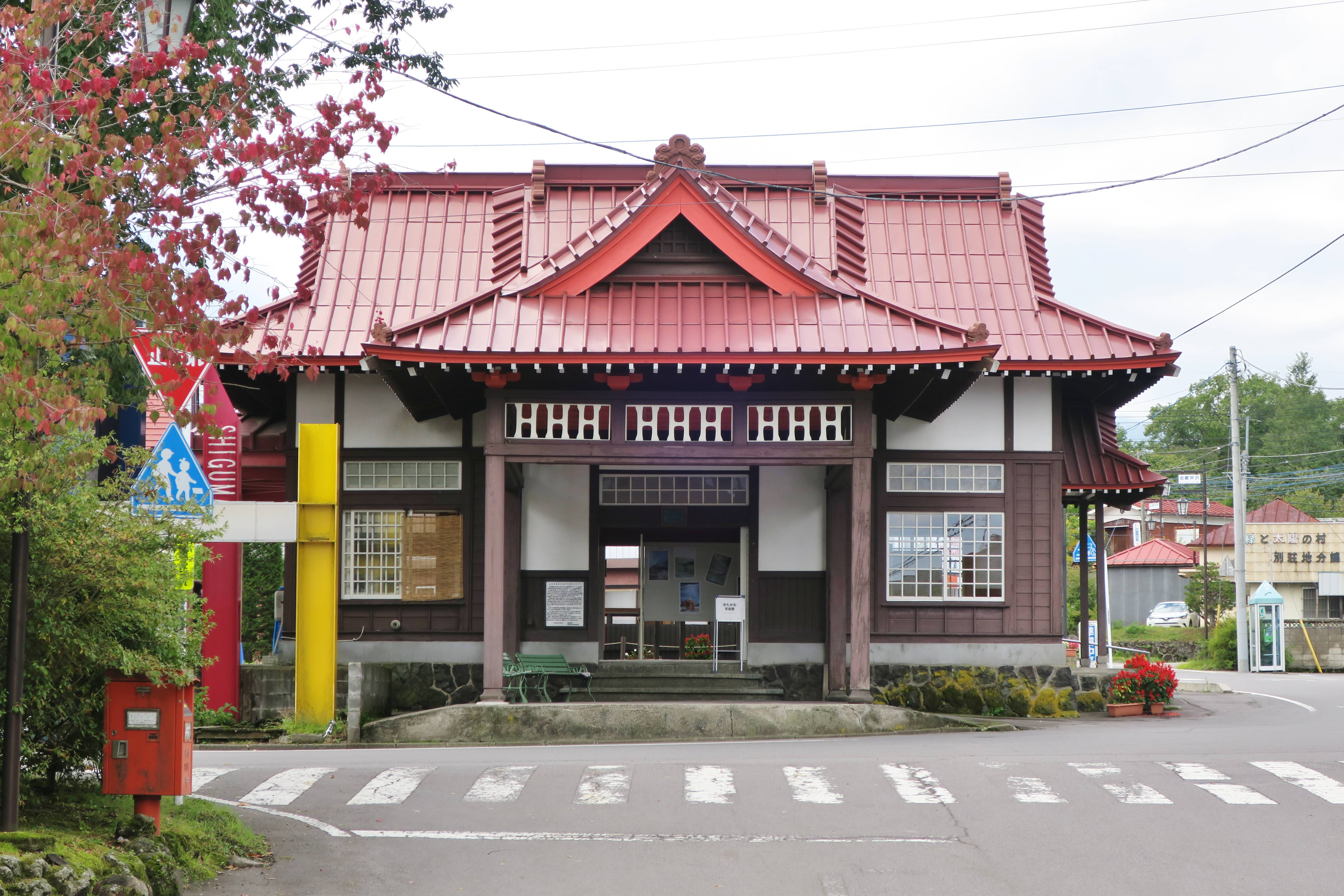
- View of the entrance from Makinomiya Shrine

General information
- Location: Naganohara, Agatsuma, Gunma Prefecture; Japan
- Coordinates: 36.4663°N 138.5898°E
- Operator: Kusakaru Electric Railway
- Line: Kusakaru Electric Railway Line
- Distance: 25.8 km from Shin-Karuizawa Station
- Platforms: 2
- Tracks: 2

Other information
- Status: Staffed

History
- Opened: 15 June 1918
- Closed: 25 April 1960
Location
- Location within Gunma Prefecture Location within Japan

Kita-Karuizawa Station (北軽井沢駅, Kita-karuizawa-eki) was a railway station in the city of Naganohara, Gunma, Japan, operated by the private railway operating company Kusakaru Electric Railway [ja].

== Overview ==
On 15 June 1918, this station was established as Jizogawa Station. In 1927, this station was renamed Kita-Karuizawa Station from Jizogawa Station. This station was closed on 25 April 1960 since stations in between Joshu-Mihara Station and Shin-Karuizawa Station of Kusakaru Electric Railway Line was discontinued due to multiple disasters by typhoon.

=== Chronicle ===
- On 15 June 1918 - Jizogawa Station was established as an irregular station of Kusatsu Electric Railway
- On 22 September 1919 - changed to a regular station
- On 25 April 1960 - Abolition
- On 29 November 2006 - This station building was registered as Tangible Cultural Property (Japan)

== Surrounding area ==
Asama Farm is located near this station. Mount Asama is visible to the south-west from this station.

- Japan National Route 146
- Mt. Asama Stone Magma Park (Onioshidashi Park)

== Others ==
On 29 November 2006, this station building was registered as Tangible Cultural Property (Japan) by Agency of Cultural Affairs. Presently, this building is opened for free during the summer.

== Adjacent stations ==
Kusakaru Electric Railway
Yuzawa Station - kita-Karuizawa Station - Agatsuma Station

== Bus routes ==
The bus terminal is located in front of the former station building.

- Kusakaru Kotsu
  - For Karuizawa Station
  - For Naganohara-Kusatsuguchi Station
  - For Kusatsu Onsen Bus Terminal via Haneo Station
- Tokyu Bus, Seibu Bus and Keio Bus
  - For Shibuya Station and Tama Plaza Station or Futako-Tamagawa Station
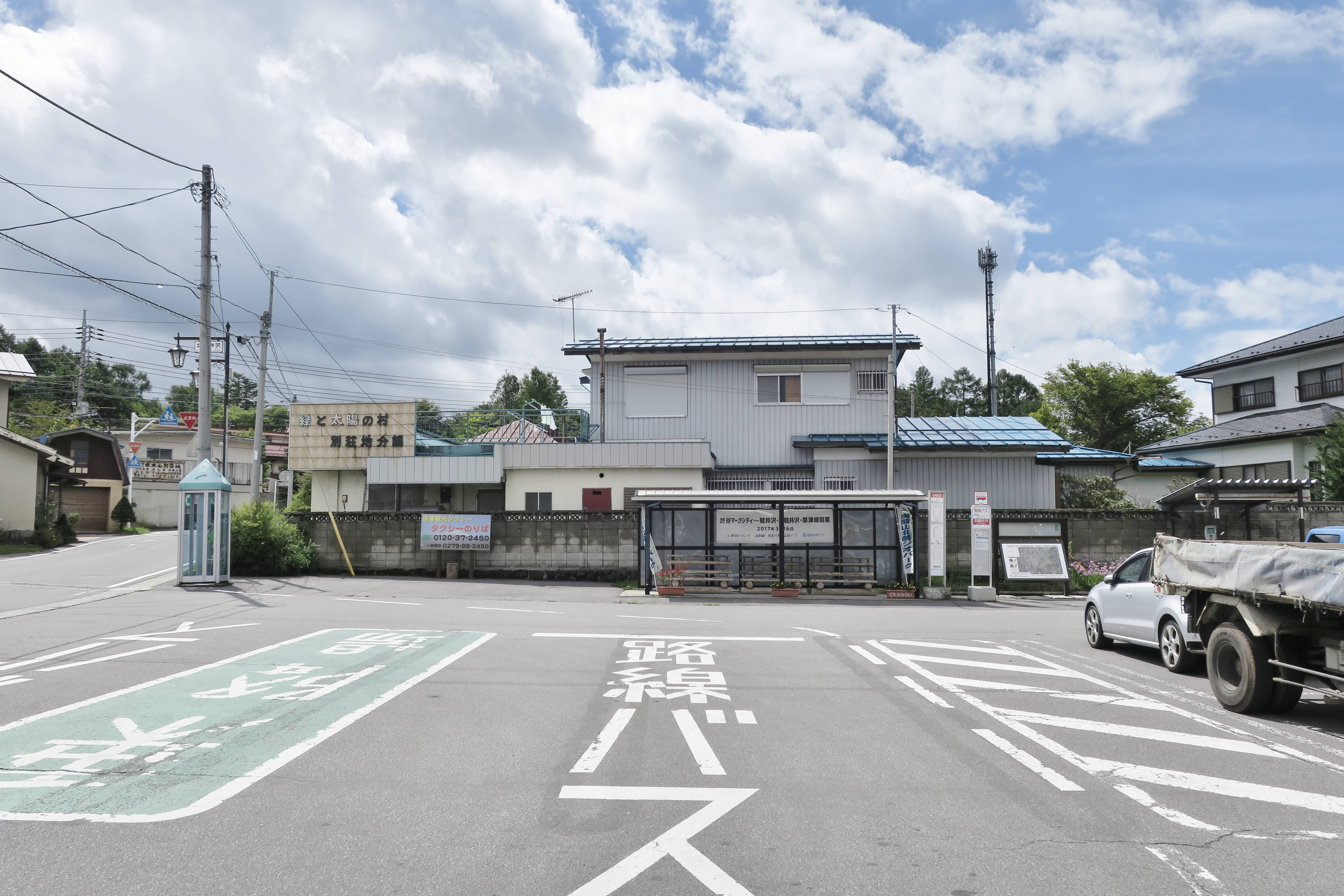
Bus terminal

== See also ==
- Tokyu Corporation (Kusakaru Kotsu was a subsidiary company)
- Prince Hotel (Mt. Asama Magma Park is operated by this company)
- Kusatsu Onsen Station
- Karuizawa Station
