= Karuizawa Station =

Railway station in Karuizawa, Nagano Prefecture, Japan

Karuizawa Station 軽井沢駅
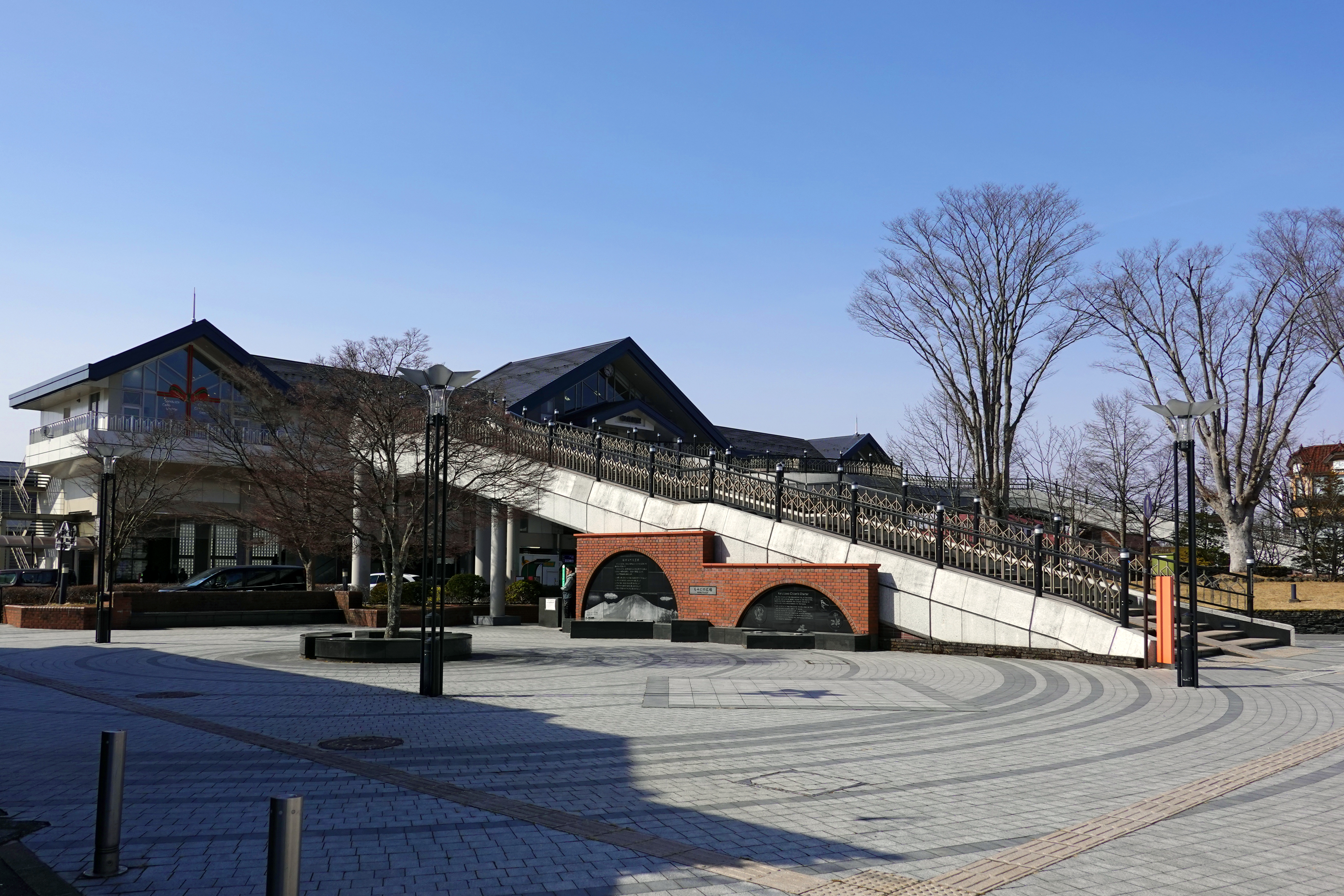
- North side of Karuizawa Station, March 2026

Japanese name
- Shinjitai: 軽井沢駅
- Kyūjitai: 輕井澤驛
- Hiragana: かるいざわえき

General information
- Location: Karuizawa, Karuizawa Town, Kitasaku District, Nagano Prefecture 389-0102; Japan
- Coordinates: 36°20′33.18″N 138°38′6.22″E
- Elevation: 941 m (3,087 ft)
- Operator: JR East; Shinano Railway
- Lines: Hokuriku Shinkansen; ■ Shinano Railway Line
- Platforms: 3 island platforms
- Tracks: 6
- Connections: Bus stop

Other information
- Status: Staffed (Midori no Madoguchi )

History
- Opened: 1 December 1888; 137 years ago

Passengers
- FY2015: 2,889 daily (JR East)

Services
Preceding station	JR East	Following station
Sakudaira towards Jōetsumyōkō	Hokuriku Shinkansen Hakutaka	Takasaki towards Tokyo
Sakudaira towards Nagano	Hokuriku Shinkansen Asama	Annaka-Haruna towards Tokyo
Preceding station	Shinano Railway	Following station
Naka-Karuizawa towards Nagano	Shinano Railway Line Rapid; Local	Terminus
Former services
Preceding station	JR East	Following station
Naka-Karuizawa towards Niigata	Shin'etsu Main Line	Yokokawa towards Takasaki
Location
- Location within Nagano Prefecture Location within Central Japan Location within Japan

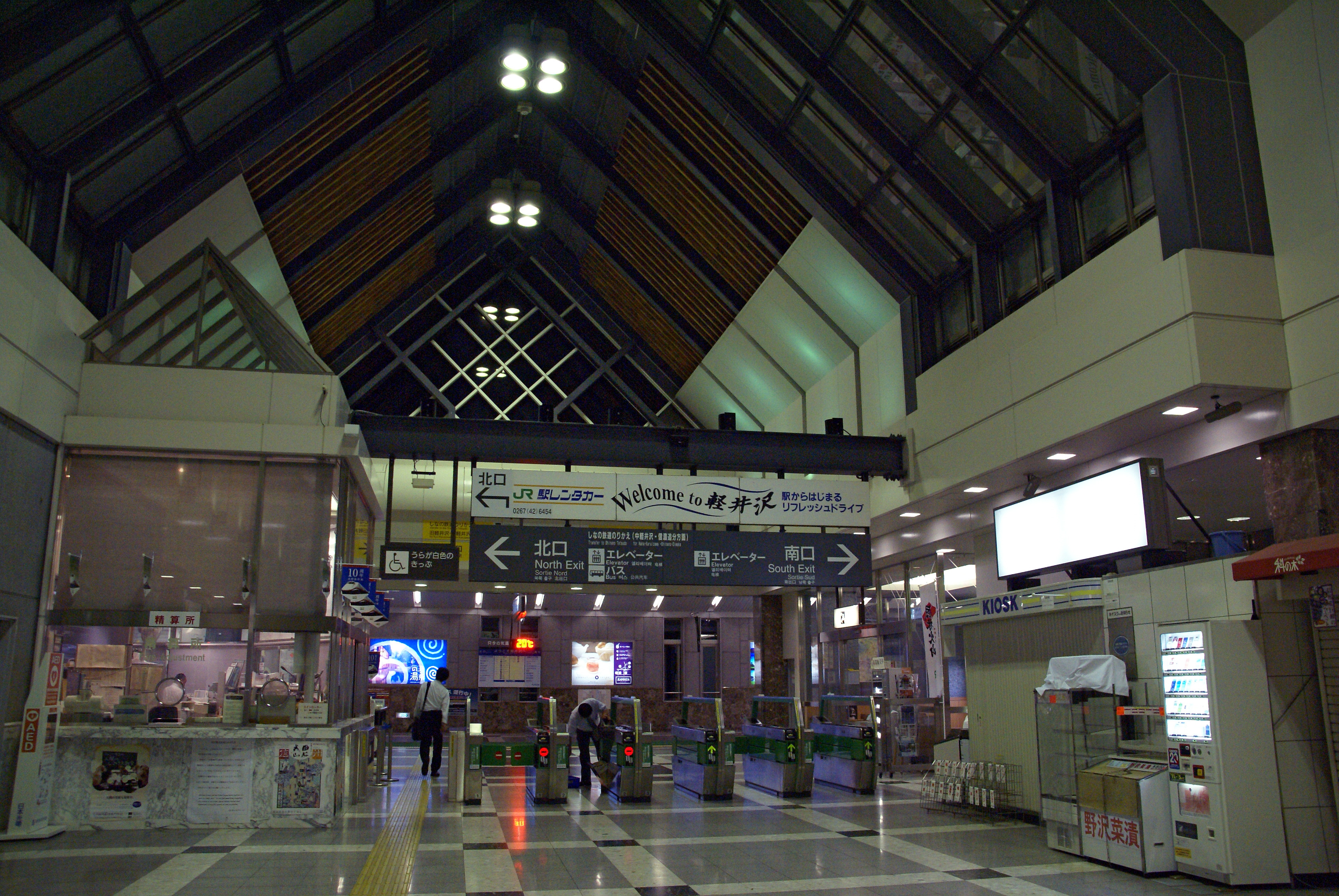
Shinkansen gate (from inside)

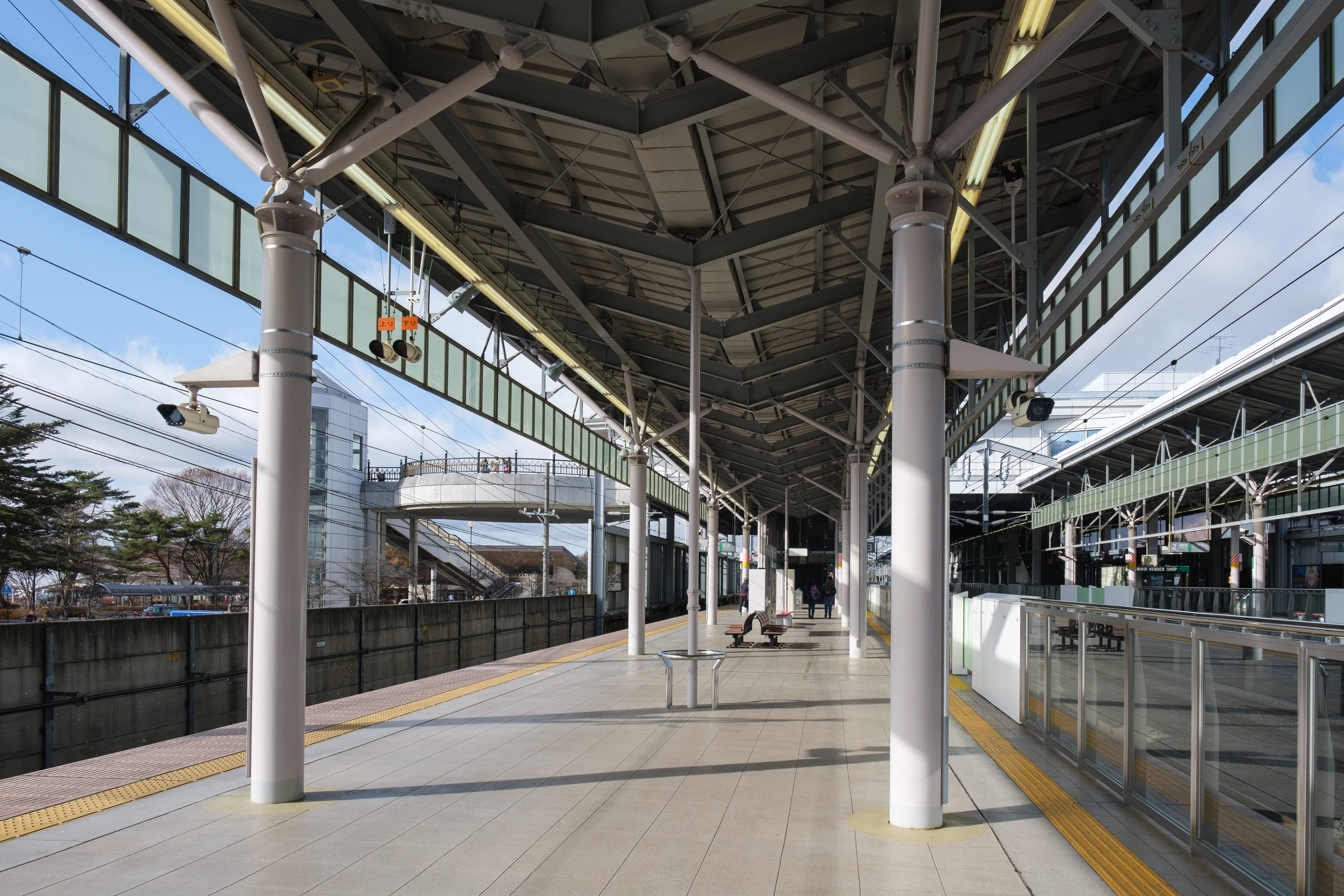
View from Shinkansen platform of Karuizawa Station

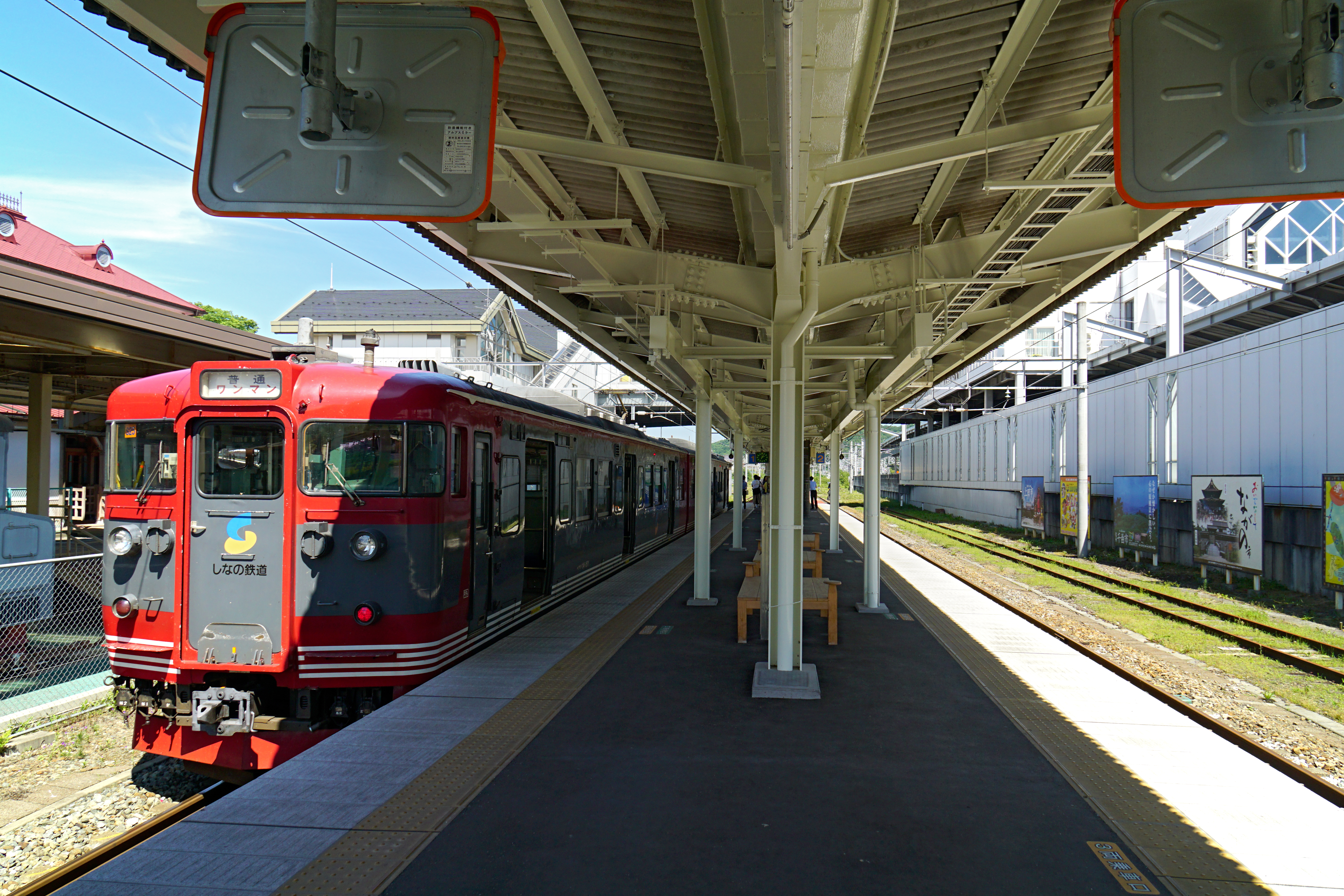
Shinano Railway Line platform, July 2016

Karuizawa Station (軽井沢駅, Karuizawa-eki) is a railway station in the town of Karuizawa, Nagano, Japan, operated jointly by the JR Group company East Japan Railway Company (JR East) and the third-sector railway operator Shinano Railway.

== Lines ==
Karuizawa Station is served by the JR East Hokuriku Shinkansen high-speed line from Tokyo to Kanazawa via Nagano. On the Shinkansen line, it is located 146.8 kilometers from Tokyo Station. It is also a terminal station for the 65.1 kilometer Shinano Railway Line which operates between Karuizawa and Nagano.

== Station layout ==
The JR portion of the station has two elevated island platforms, serving four tracks, with the station building underneath. The station has a Midori no Madoguchi staffed ticket office. The Shinano Railway portion of the station has one ground-level island platform serving two tracks, connected to the JR East portion of the station by a footbridge.

=== JR East platforms ===
1/2	■ Hokuriku Shinkansen	for Takasaki, Ōmiya, and Tokyo
3/4	■ Hokuriku Shinkansen	for Nagano, Toyama, and Kanazawa

=== Shinano Railway platforms ===
1/2	■ Shinano Railway Line	for Komoro, Ueda, Shinonoi, and Nagano

== History ==
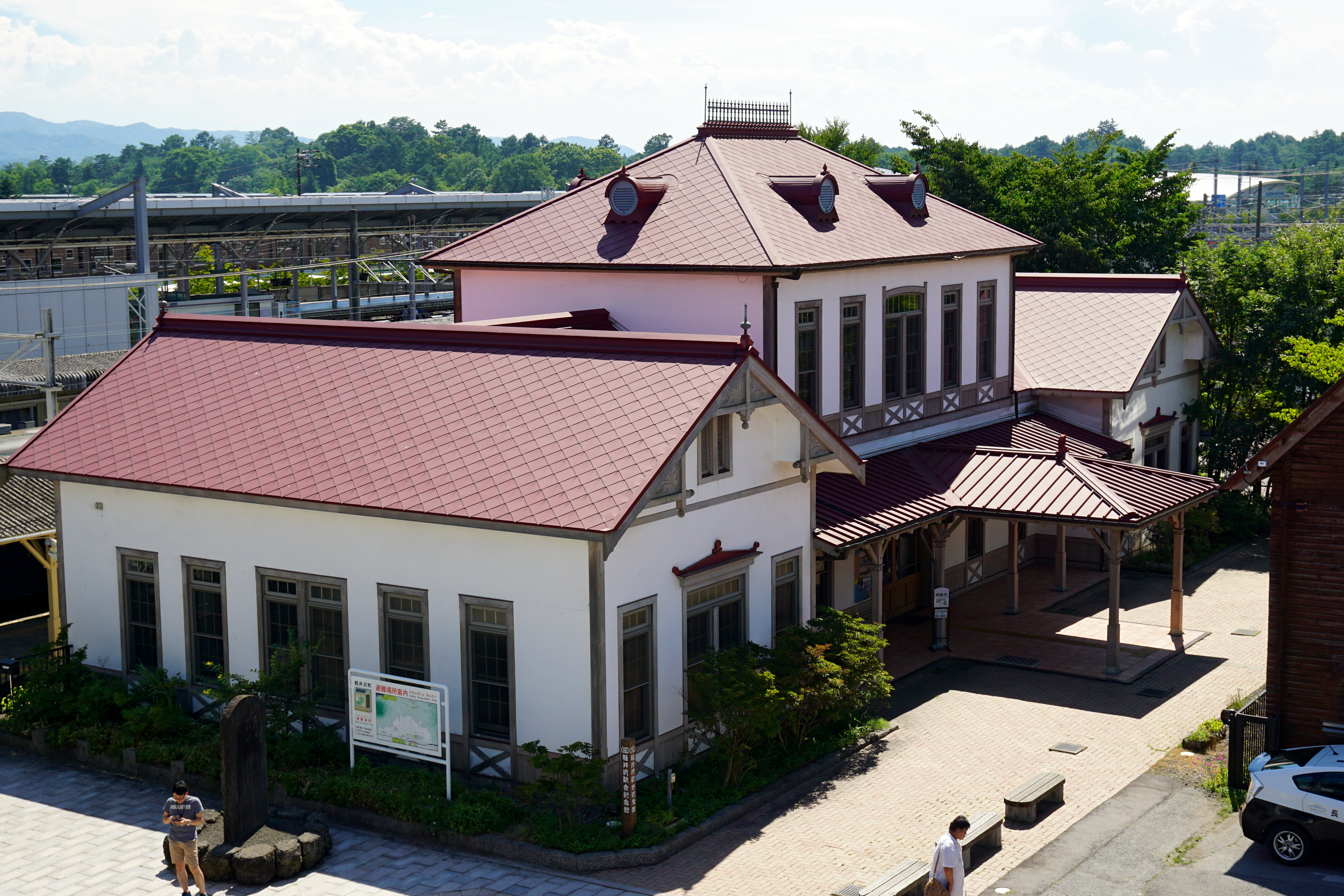
Preserved old station building

The station began service on December 1, 1888, as the terminal of the Japanese Government Railways between Naoetsu (near the Sea of Japan coast) and Karuizawa. The line was extended from Karuizawa to Yokokawa through the Usui Pass on April 1, 1893, completing the trunk line between Takasaki (connecting to a Nippon Railway line to Ueno Station in Tokyo) and Naoetsu, which was later named the Shinetsu Main Line. At Karuizawa, all trains were coupled with or separated from helper locomotives that were required for all trains to go through the Usui Pass section.

When the Japanese National Railways (JNR) were divided and privatized on April 1, 1987, Shinetsu Main Line became a part of the system of East Japan Railway Company (JR East). On October 1, 1997, JR East opened the Nagano Shinkansen with a stop at Karuizawa. At the same time, JR East ceased to operate the conventional Shinetsu Main Line between Yokokawa and Shinonoi, of which, the section between Yokokawa and Karuizawa (Usui Pass) was closed permanently and the remaining section was transferred to Shinano Railway. Since then, Karuizawa Station has been shared by JR East and Shinano Railway.

== Passenger statistics ==
In fiscal 2015, the JR East portion of the station was used by an average of 2,889 passengers daily (boarding passengers only).

== Surrounding area ==
- Karuizawa Prince Shopping Plaza
- Karuizawa Prince Hotel Ski Resort

=== Hotels ===
- Karuizawa Prince Hotel
- Mampei Hotel
- Mikasa Hotel

== Bus routes ==
Track 1

- Seibu Kanko Bus
  - For Manza-Kazawaguchi Station
  - For Manza Onsen and Shirane Kazan

Track 2

- Kusakaru Kotsu
  - For Kita-Karuizawa
  - For Naganohara-Kusatsuguchi Station
  - For Kusatsu Onsen Bus Terminal

Track 3

- Seibu Bus and Chikuma Bus
  - For Kawagoe Matoba, Nerima Station and Ikebukuro Station
  - For Tamagawa-Josui Station and Tachikawa Station
- Tokyu Bus
  - For Shibuya Station and Futako-tamagawa Station
- Kintetsu Bus
  - For Namba Station

Track 4

- Community bus
  - Around Karuizawa Town

Track 5

- JR BUS KANTO Usui Line
  - For Yokokawa Station
    - This bus route passes through Megane Bridge during autumn.

North Exit

- Shoei Kotsu
  - For Nagano Station and Suzaka Station
  - For Shinjuku Station and Tokyo Station

== Gallery ==
South Exit, March 2026

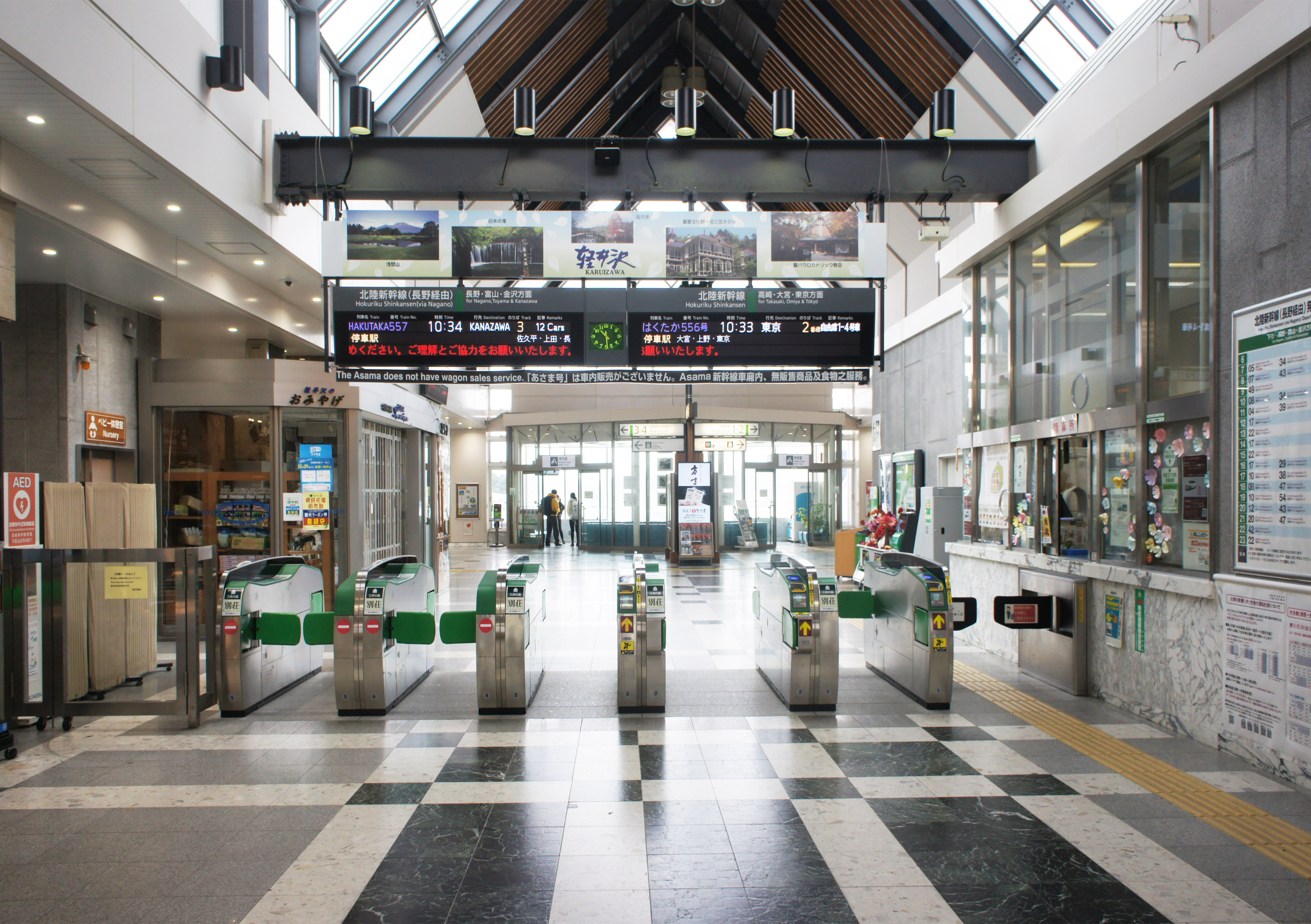
Shinkansen fare gates, October 2021

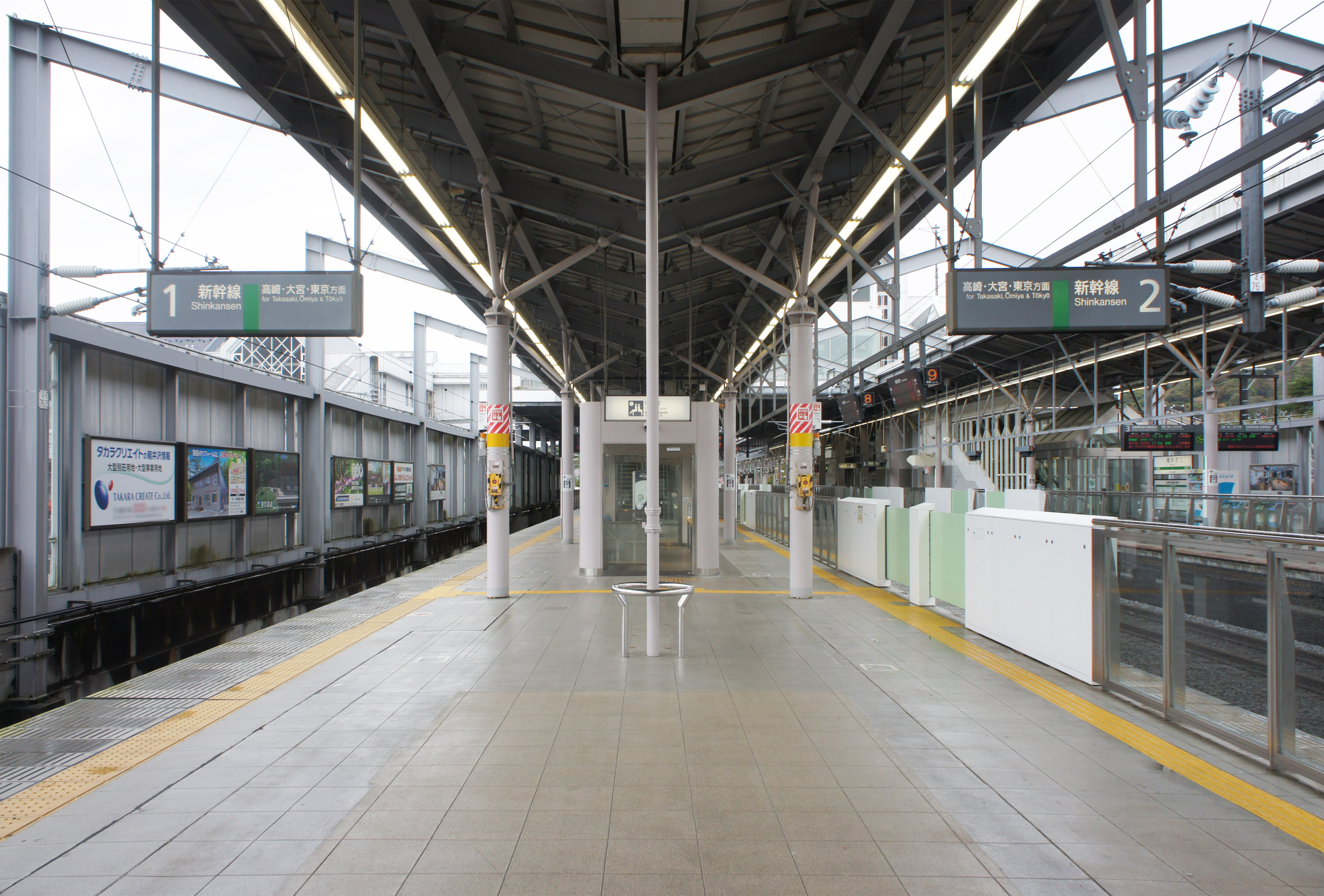
Shinkansen Platforms 1 and 2, October 2021

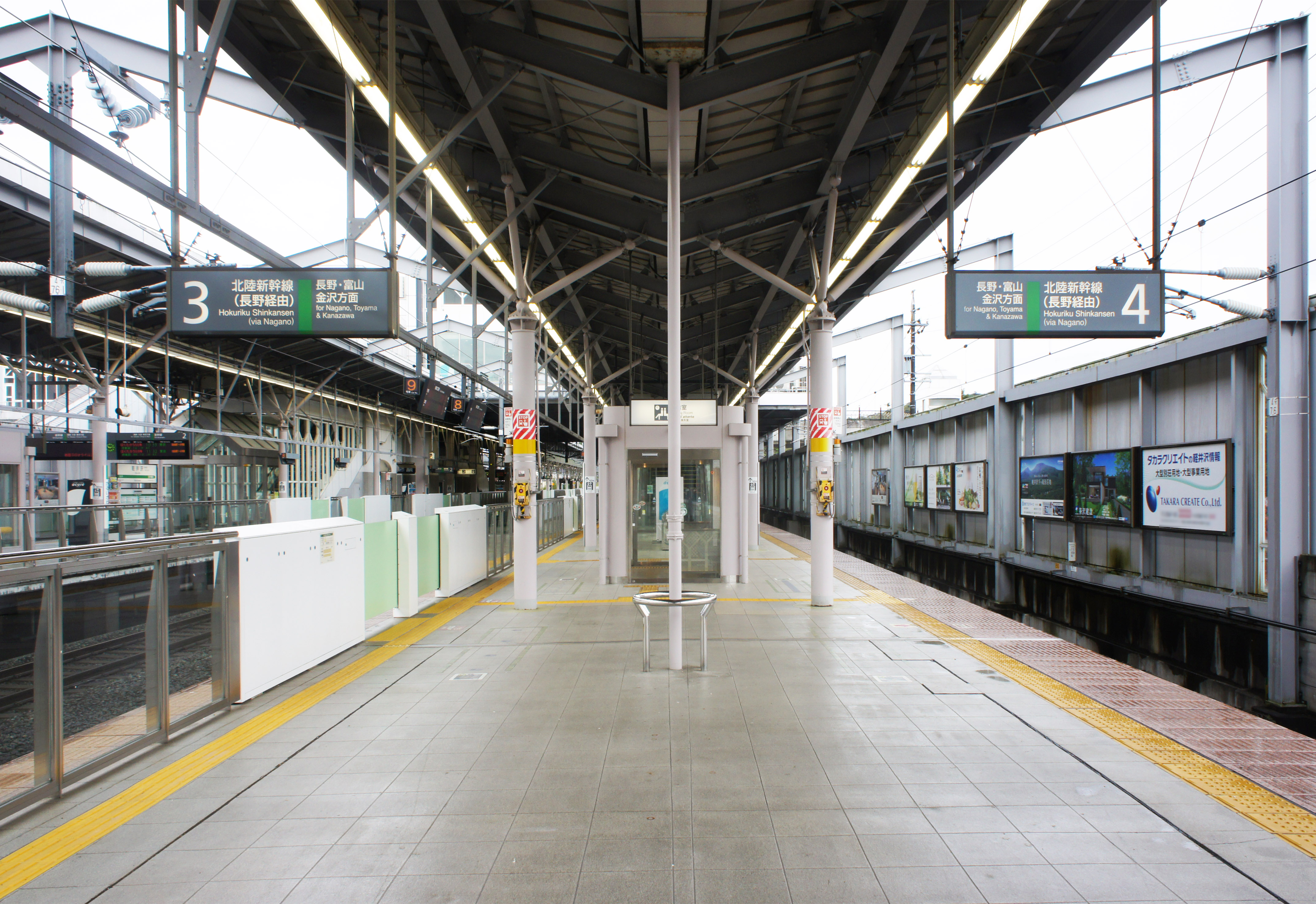
Shinkansen Platforms 3 and 4, October 2021

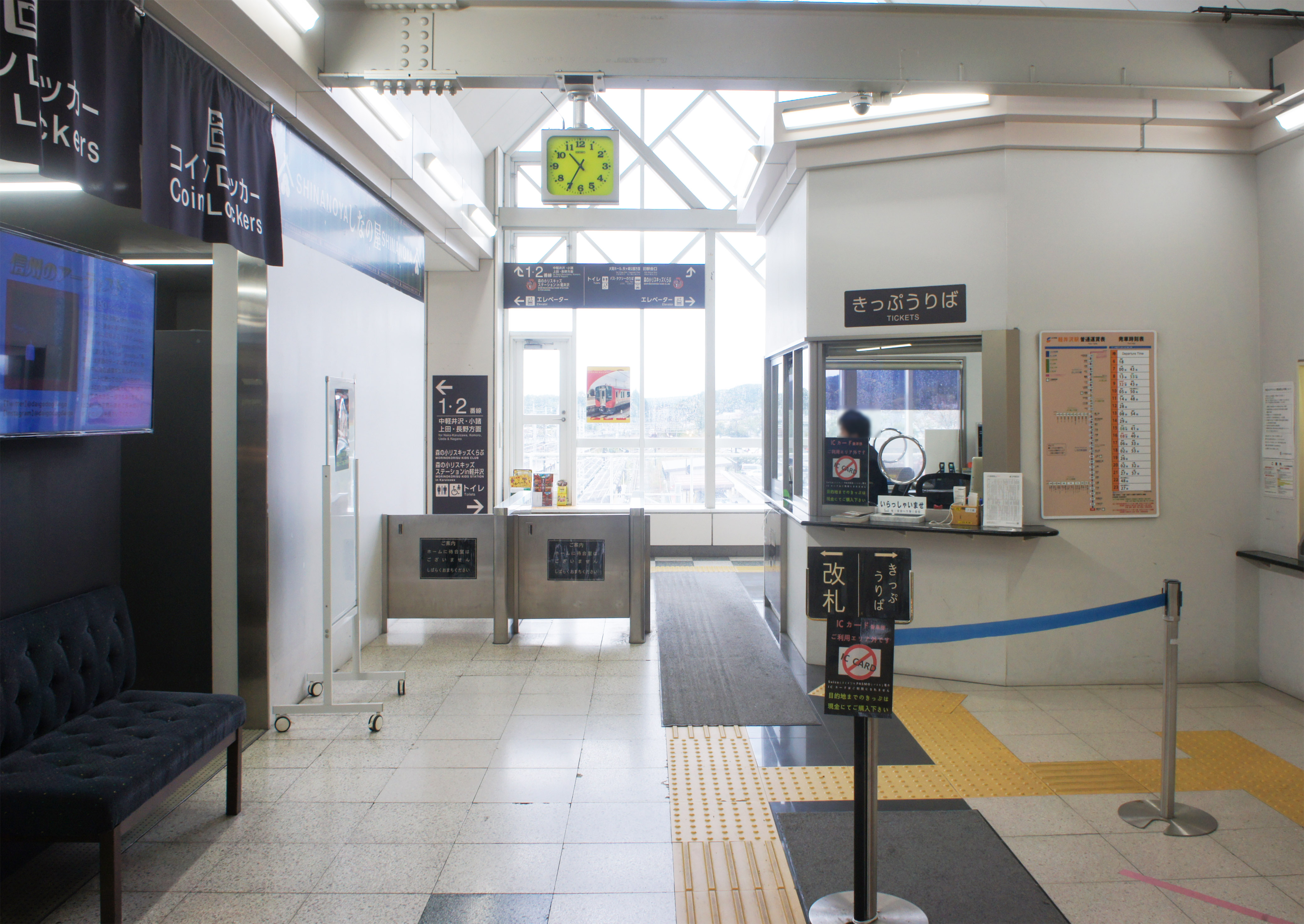
Conventional gates, with locker and coin lockers for rent on the left, October 2021

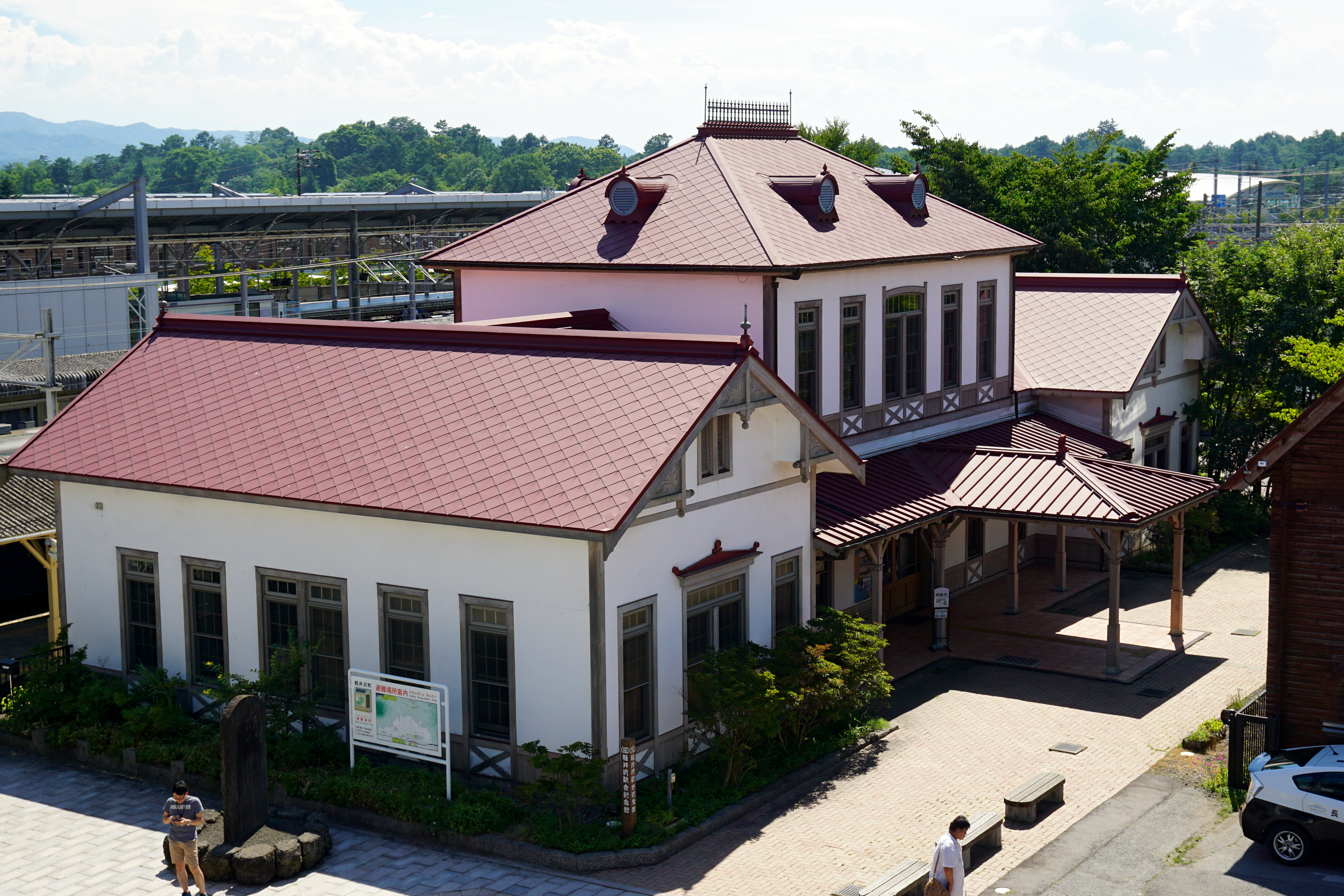
Old station building, July 2016

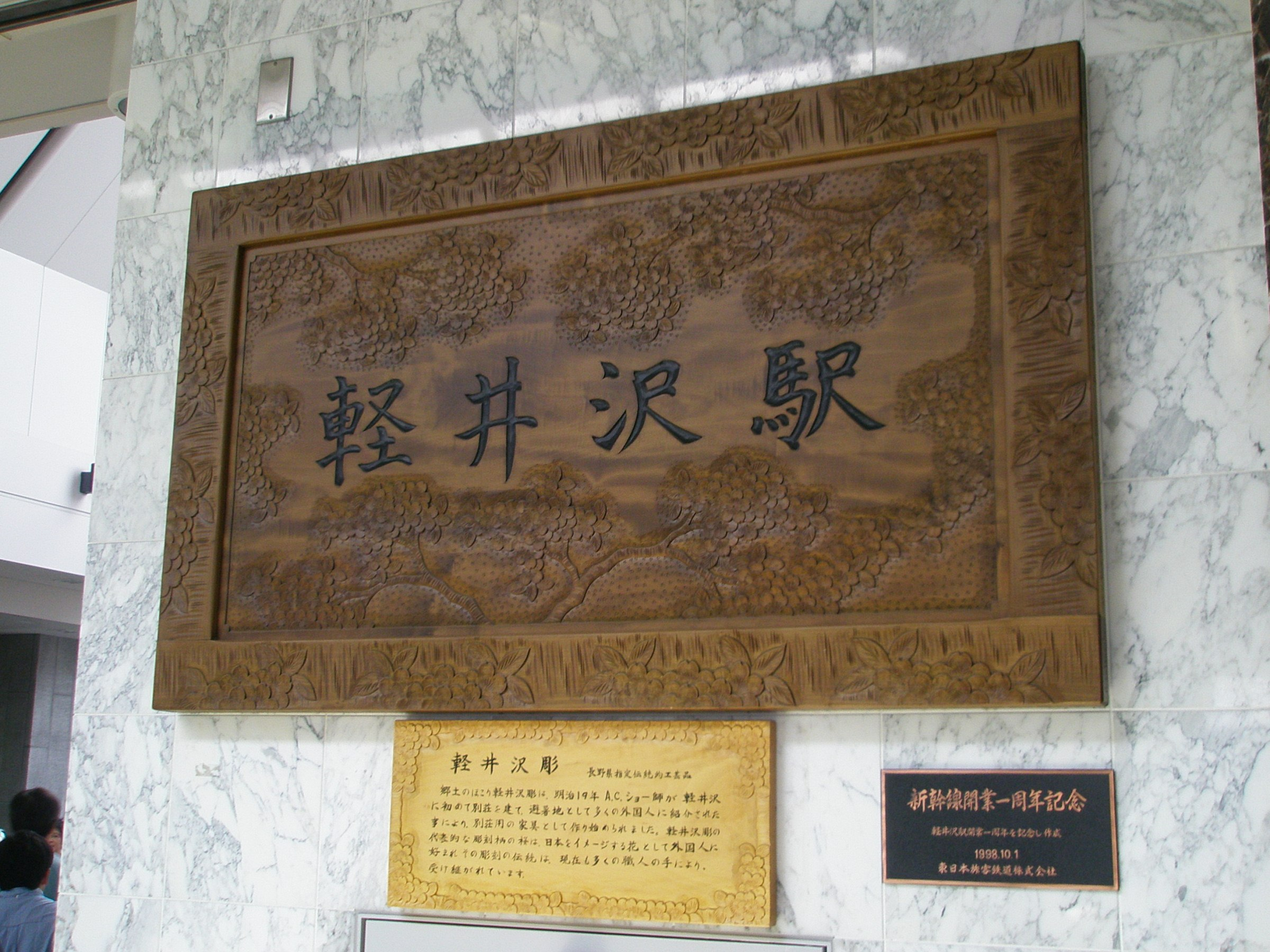
Nameplate of the station, July 2011

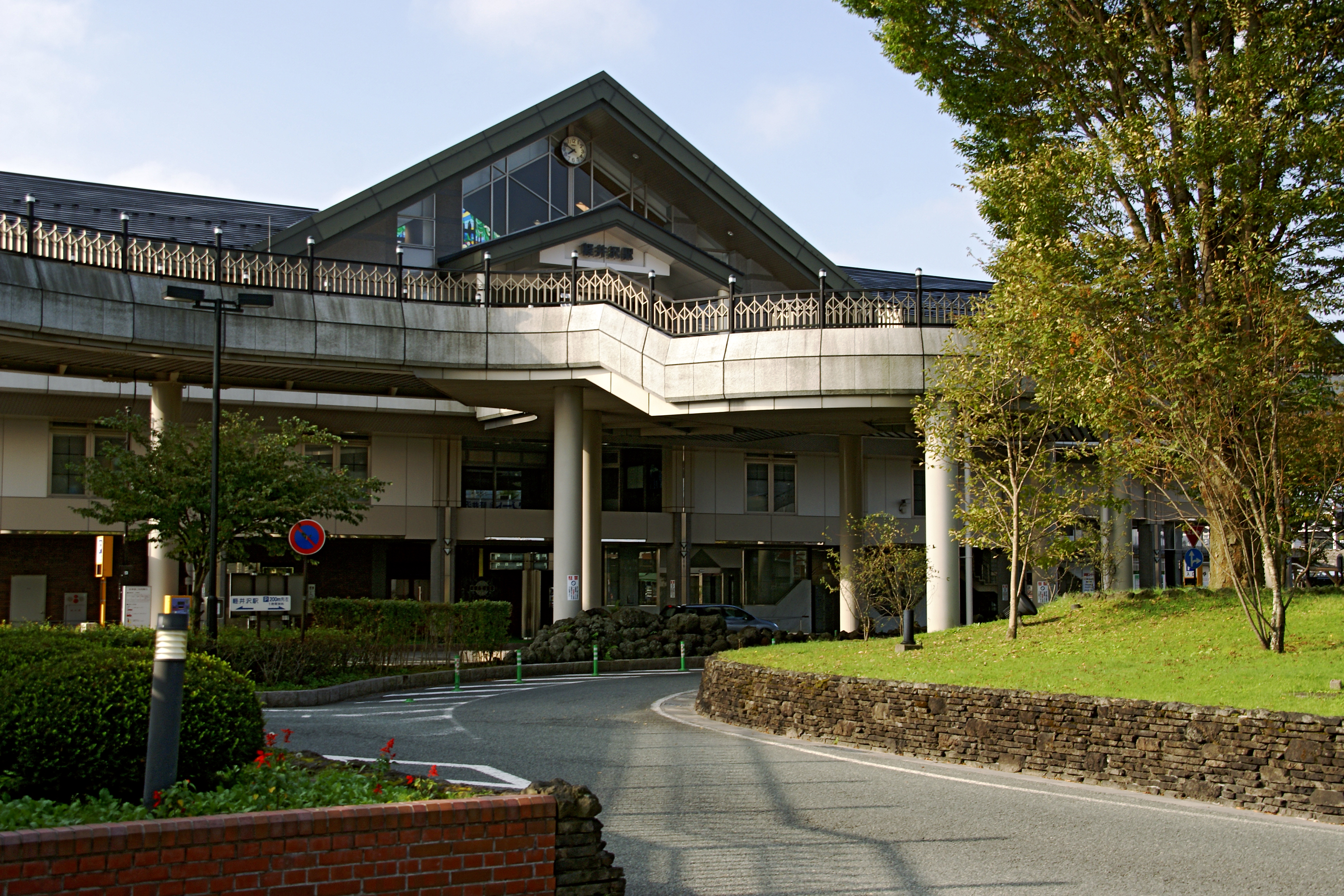
Station structure, 2007

== See also ==
- List of railway stations in Japan
