= Naganohara-Kusatsuguchi Station =

Railway station in Naganohara, Gunma Prefecture, Japan

Naganohara-Kusatsuguchi Station 長野原草津口駅
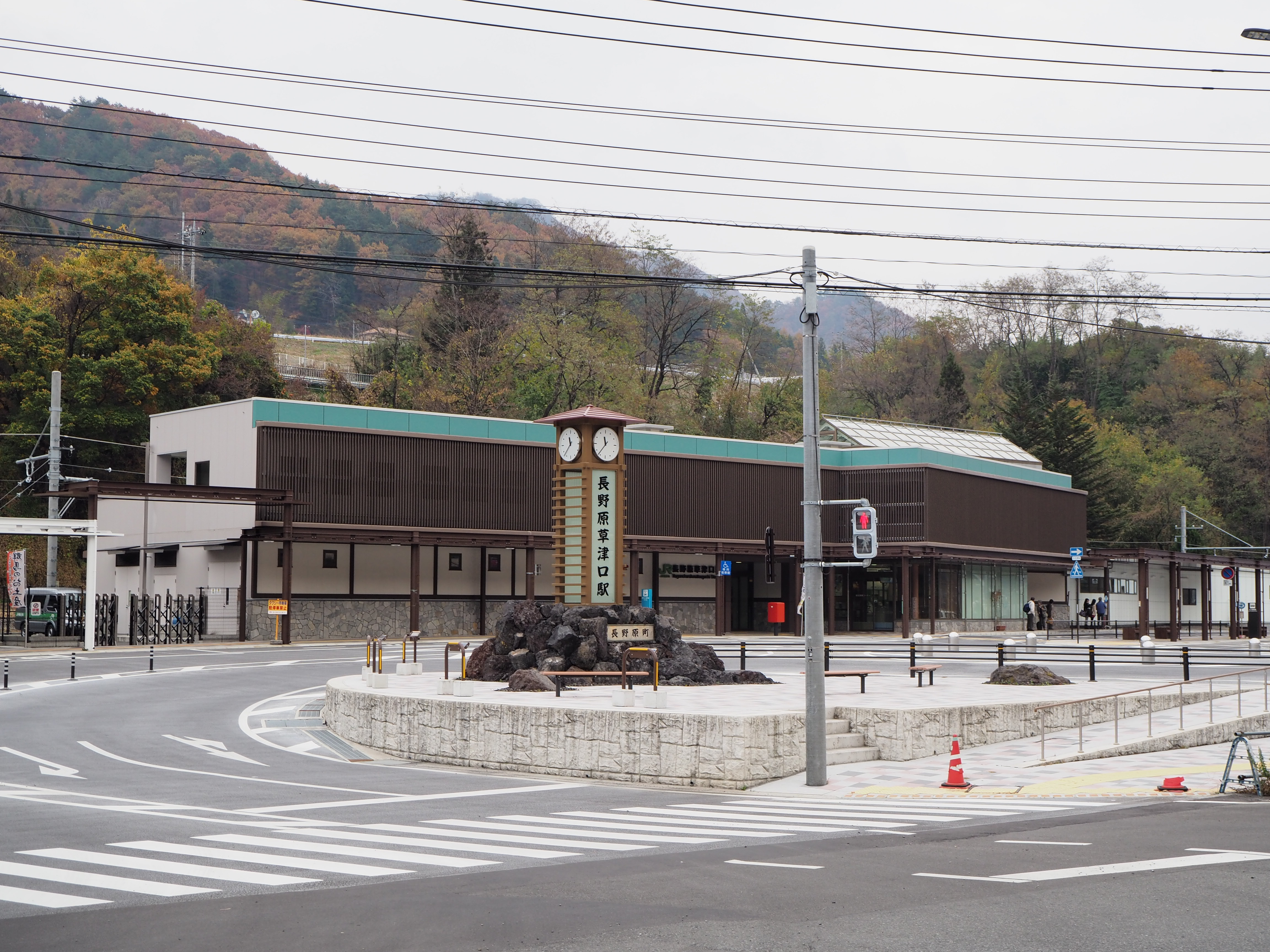
- Naganohara-Kusatsuguchi Station, November 2015

General information
- Location: 1276 Naganohara, Naganohara-machi, Agatsuma-gun, Gunma-ken 377-1304; Japan
- Coordinates: 36.5464°N 138.6498°E
- Operator: JR East
- Line: ■ Agatsuma Line
- Distance: 42.0 km from Shibukawa
- Platforms: 1 island platform

Other information
- Status: Staffed
- Website: Official website

History
- Opened: 2 January 1945
- Former names: Naganohara (to 1991)

Passengers
- FY2019: 741

Services
| Preceding station | JR East | Following station |
|---|---|---|
| Terminus | Kusatsu | Nakanojō towards Ueno |
| Gunma-Ōtsu towards Ōmae | Agatsuma Line | Kawarayu-Onsen towards Takasaki |
Location
- Location within Gunma Prefecture Location within Japan

Naganohara-Kusatsuguchi Station (長野原草津口駅, Naganohara-Kusatsuguchi-eki) is a passenger railway station in the town of Naganohara, Gunma Prefecture, Japan, operated by East Japan Railway Company (JR East).

== Lines ==
Naganohara-Kusatsuguchi Station is a station on the Agatsuma Line, and is located 42.0 kilometers from the terminus of the line at Shibukawa Station.

== Station layout ==
The station consists of a single island platform serving two tracks connected to the station building by a footbridge. The station has three floors and a toilet. There is a JR Bus terminal adjacent to the station.

=== Platforms ===
| 1 | ■ Agatsuma Line | for Nakanojō, Shibukawa and Takasaki |
| 2 | ■ Agatsuma Line | for Nakanojō, Shibukawa and Takasaki for Manza-Kazawaguchi and Ōmae |

== History ==
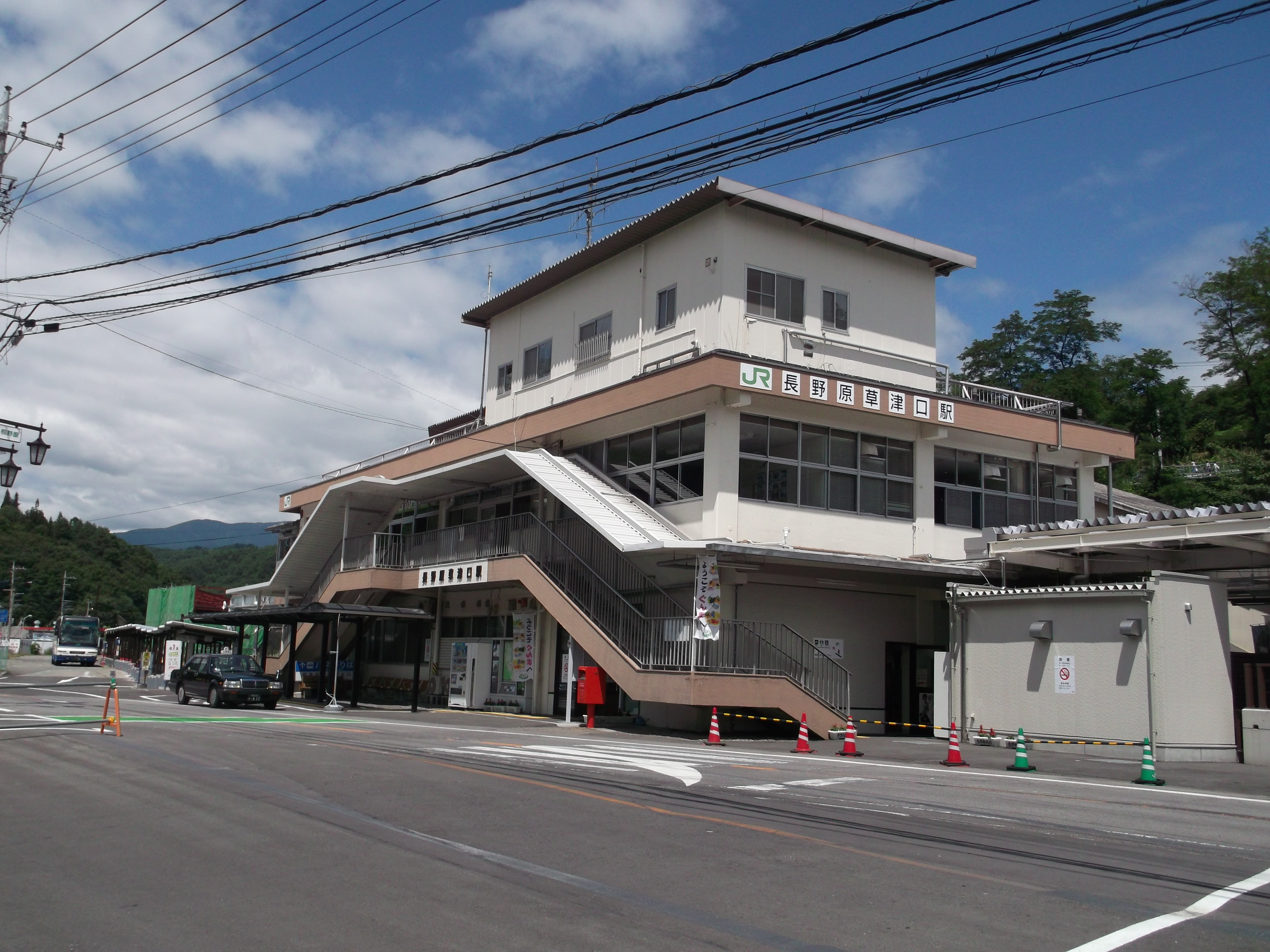
The previous station building, August 2012

The station opened on 2 January 1945, initially named Naganohara Station (長野原駅). It was renamed to its present name on December 1, 1991.

A new station building was formally completed on 27 July 2013, opening to the public from 1 August 2013.

== Bus routes ==
=== Highway Buses ===
- The Naganohara-Kusatsuguchi bus stop located near Agatsuma River
  - "Joshu Yumeguri" For Shinjuku Highway Bus Terminal via Nerima Station・Nakano-Sakaue Station (operated by JR Bus)
  - "Tokyo Yumeguri" For Tokyo Station (operated by JR Bus)

=== Route buses ===
- Track 1,2（JR Bus）
  - "Shiga Kusatsu Kogen Line"
    - For Kusatsu Onsen Bus Terminal
- Track 3（JR Bus）
  - "Shiga Kusatsu Kogen Line" and "Shirane Kazan Line"
    - For Kusatsu Onsen Bus Terminal or Shirane Volcano（JR Bus）
- Track 4 (Kusakaru Kotsu)
  - For Kita-Karuizawa
- Track 5 (Nakanojo Municipal Bus entrust Rose Queen Kotsu)
  - Kuni Village Line
    - For Lake Nozori via Hanashiki Onsen

== Surrounding area ==
- National Route 145
- National Route 146
- National Route 292
- Naganohara Post Office
- Naganohara City Hall

== See also ==
- List of railway stations in Japan
