= Kusatsu Station =

Kusatsu Station (草津駅) is the name of two train stations in Japan:

- Kusatsu Station (Hiroshima)
- Kusatsu Station (Shiga)
