= Mount Kusatsu-Shirane =

Stratovolcano on the island of Honshu, Japan

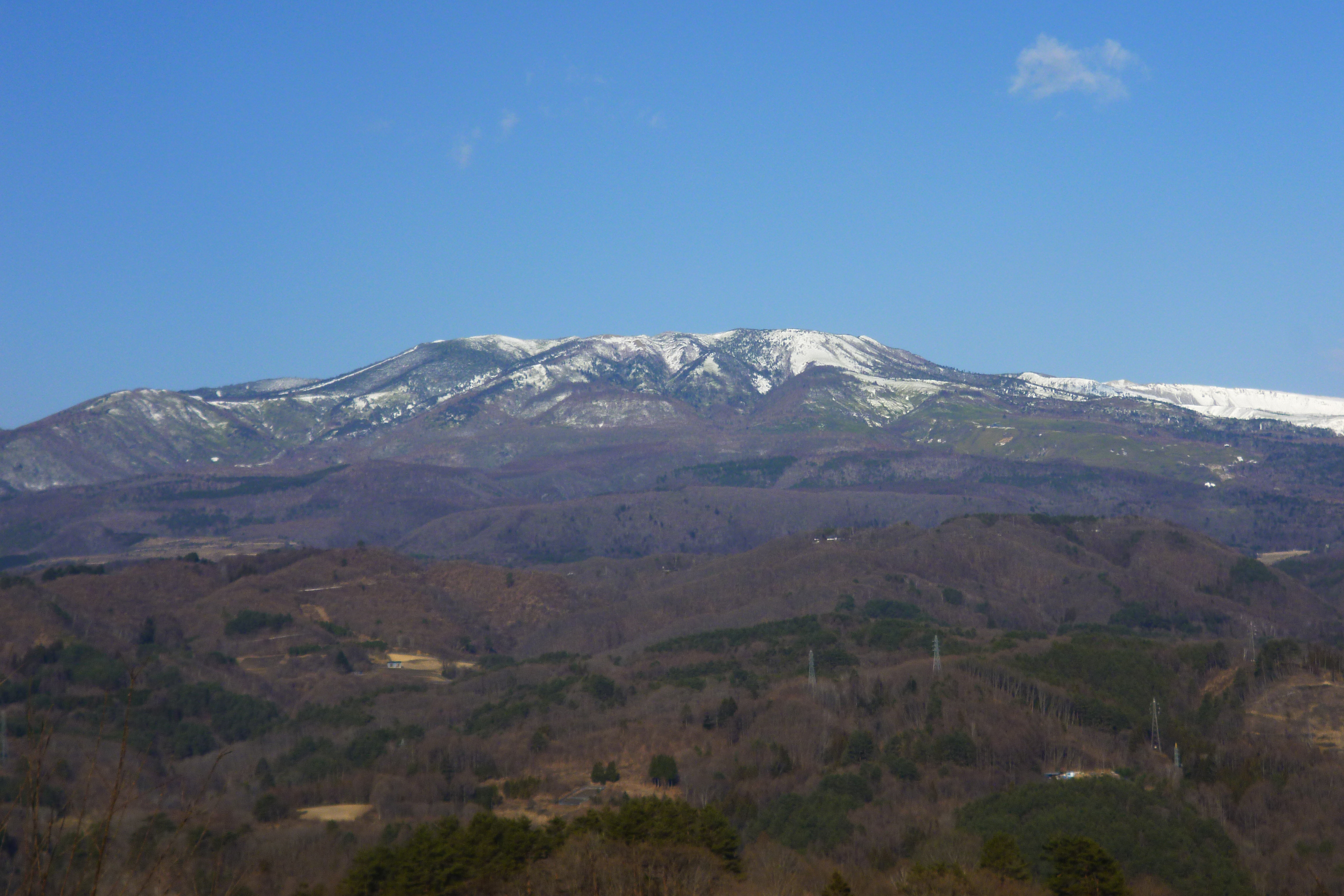
- View of Mount Kusatsu-Shirane from the southeast

Highest point
- Elevation: 2,165 m (7,103 ft)
- Coordinates: 36.6438°N 138.5279°E

Naming
- Native name: 草津白根山 (Japanese)

Geography
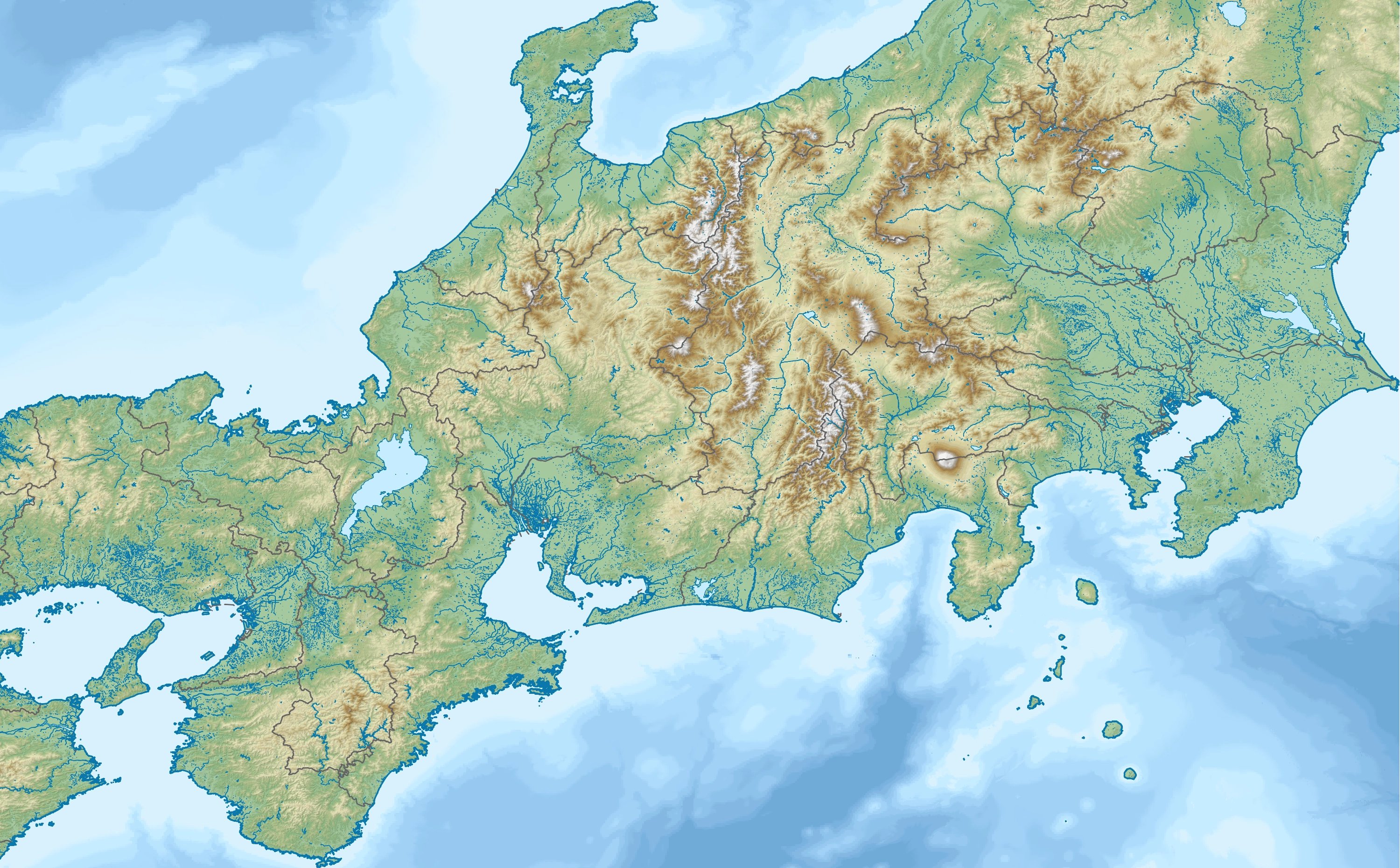
- Location within Central Japan Location within Japan
- Location: Honshū, Japan

Geology
- Mountain type: Stratovolcano
- Volcanic arc: Northeastern Japan Arc
- Last eruption: January 23, 2018

Mount Kusatsu-Shirane (草津白根山, Kusatsu Shirane-san) is a 2,165 m (7,103 ft) active stratovolcano in Kusatsu, Gunma, Japan. It is called Kusatsu Shirane to differentiate it from the Mount Nikkō-Shirane on the other side of Gunma Prefecture. The summit of Kusatsu-Shirane volcano, located immediately north of Asama volcano, consists of a series of overlapping pyroclastic cones and three crater lakes. The largest of these is Yu-gama, an acidic emerald green lake with rafts of yellow sulfur sometimes seen floating on its surface.

On January 23, 2018, a minor phreatic eruption of the volcano occurred. One person was killed, and others were injured in an avalanche triggered by the eruption. The next day, new activity forced police to suspend search operations. One month after the eruption, it was announced by prefectural officials that only the summit of the volcano was off limits to the public.

== 2025-2026 unrest ==
On August 4, 2025 the Japan Meteorological Agency (JMA) reported that unrest activity had increased. They also raised the Observation alert level from 1 to a 2 "Restriction on the proximity to crater". More than 40 volcanic earthquakes were reported. As of January 8, 2026, volcanic unrest has continued.

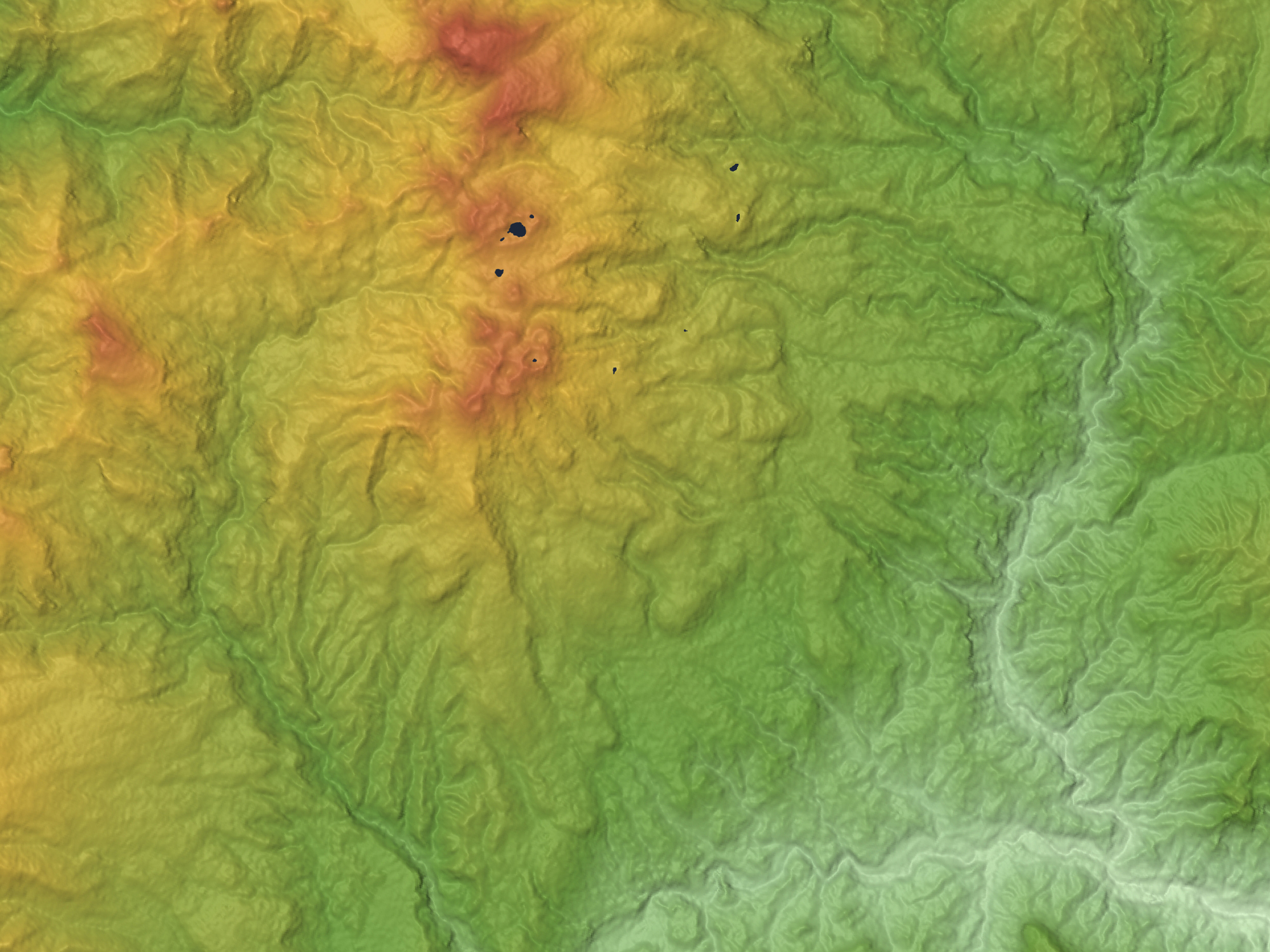
Relief map of Kusatsu-Shirane Volcano

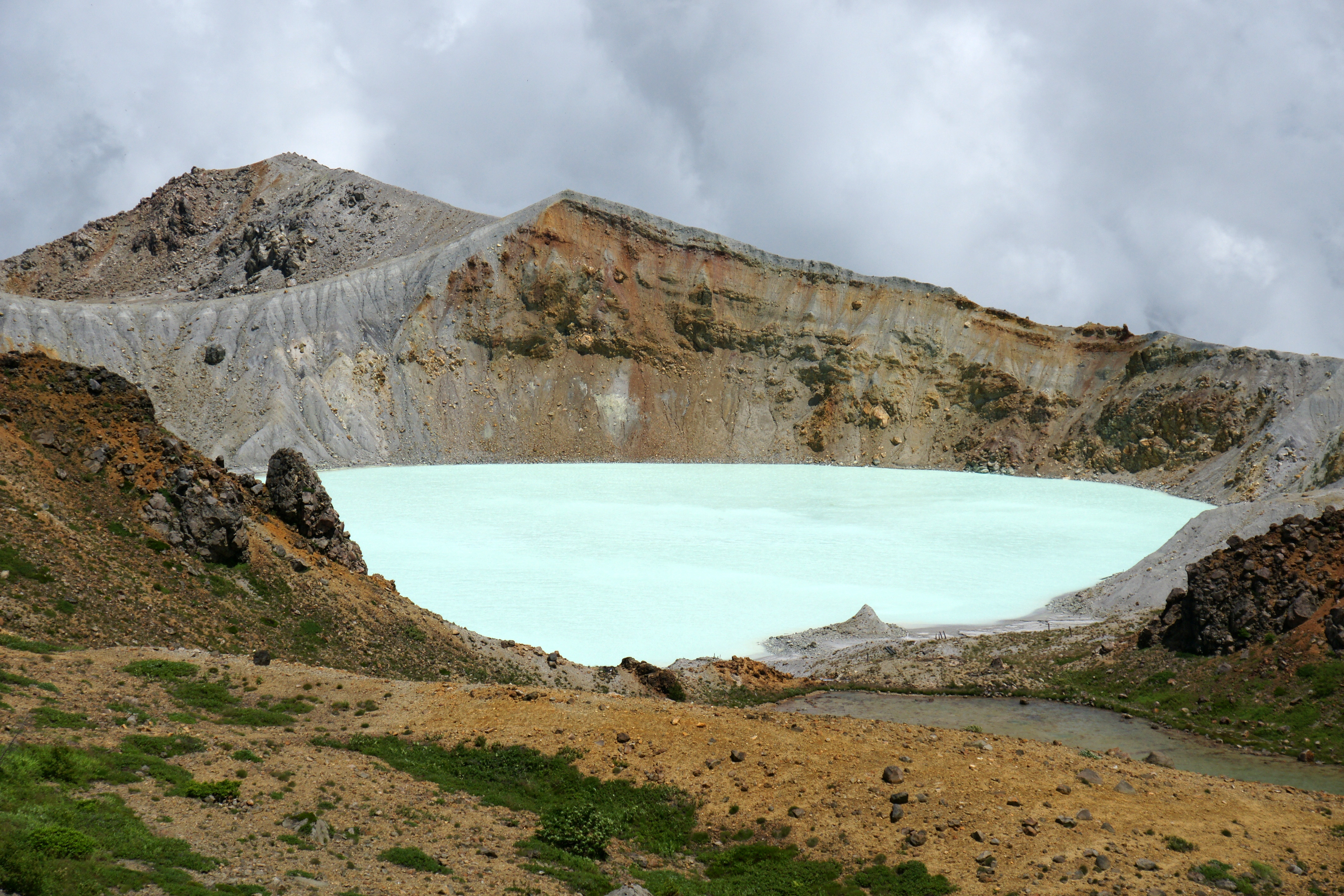
Yugama crater

== See also ==
- List of volcanoes in Japan
- List of mountains in Japan
