= Shikishima =

Shikishima is another name for Japan, derived from the ancient site of Shiki, where the emperor's palace was located.

== People ==
- Shikishima Katsumori, a Japanese sumo wrestler

== Places ==
- Shikishima, Yamanashi, in Japan
- Shikishima Station, in Gunma Prefecture, Japan

== Transport ==
- Shikishima class (PLH), a class of patrol vessel operated by the Japan Coast Guard
- Shikishima (PLH 31), a patrol vessel of the Japan Coast Guard
- Shikishima-class battleship, a class of battleships built for the Imperial Japanese Navy in the late 1890s
- E001 series, a Japanese luxury cruise train set branded Train Suite Shiki-shima. The name is a homophone of Shikishima, which means "Islands of four seasons" in Japanese.
