= Gumma-Sōja Station =

Railway station in Maebashi, Gunma Prefecture, Japan

Coordinates: 36.4154°N 139.0321°E

Gumma-Sōja Station 群馬総社駅
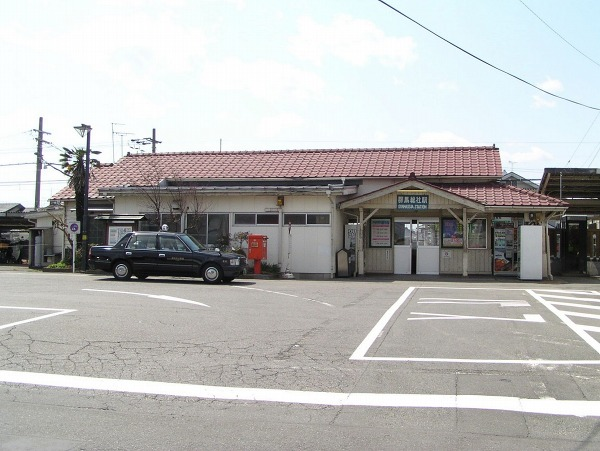
- Gumma-Sōja Station, March 2006

General information
- Location: Sōja-machi Ueno 588, Maebashi, Gunma （群馬県前橋市総社町植野588） Japan
- Operator: JR East
- Line: Jōetsu Line

History
- Opened: 1921; 105 years ago

Passengers
- FY2013: 1,534 daily

Services
Preceding station	JR East	Following station
Shin-Maebashi towards Takasaki	Jōetsu Line	Yagihara towards Nagaoka
Shin-Maebashi towards Takasaki	Agatsuma Line	Yagihara towards Ōmae
Location

Gumma-Sōja Station (群馬総社駅, Gumma-Sōja-eki) is a railway station on the Jōetsu Line in Maebashi, Gunma, Japan, operated by the East Japan Railway Company (JR East).

== Lines ==
Gumma-Sōja Station is a station on the Jōetsu Line, and is located 12.1 kilometers from the starting point of the line at Takasaki.

== Station layout ==
The station has a single side platform and a single island platform connected to the station building by a footbridge; however, only one side of the island platform is in use. The station has a Midori no Madoguchi ticket office.

=== Platforms ===
1	■ Jōetsu Line	for Takasaki, Ōmiya, and Tokyo
1	■ Agatsuma Line	for Takasaki, Ōmiya, and Tokyo
2	■ Jōetsu Line	for Shibukawa, Minakami
2	■ Agatsuma Line	for Shibukawa, Nakanojō

== History ==
Gumma-Sōja Station opened on 1 July 1921. Upon the privatization of the Japanese National Railways (JNR) on 1 April 1987, it came under the control of JR East.

== Surrounding area ==
- Shikishima kofun
- Site of Kozuke kokubun-ji
- Sōja Post Office

== See also ==
- List of railway stations in Japan
