= Fleet Review (Japan) =

Fleet Review 観艦式
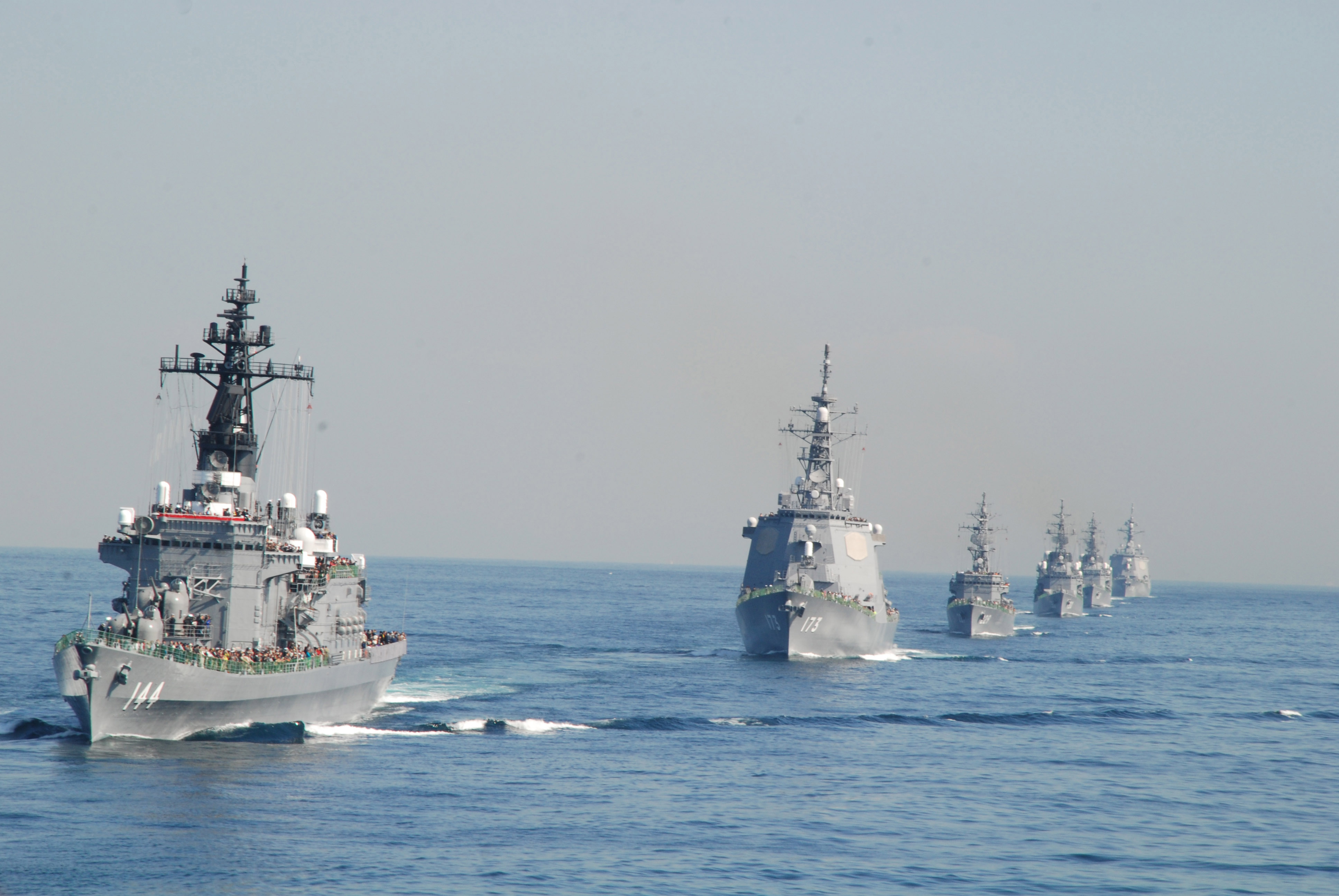
- The JMSDF fleet preparing for the 2009 Fleet Review
- Status: Active
- Frequency: Approximately triennial
- Locations: Sagami Bay, Japan
- Country: Japan
- Years active: 70
- Inaugurated: 1956
- Next event: October 14, 2019 (canceled)
- Participants: Japan Maritime Self-Defense Force; Japan Coast Guard

Both the Japan Maritime Self-Defense Force (JMSDF) and the Japan Coast Guard (JCG) has hosted Fleet Reviews on a regular basis in Sagami Bay since 1956. The fleet review continues the tradition of triennial fleet reviews held by the Imperial Japanese Navy from 1868 to 1940.

== History ==
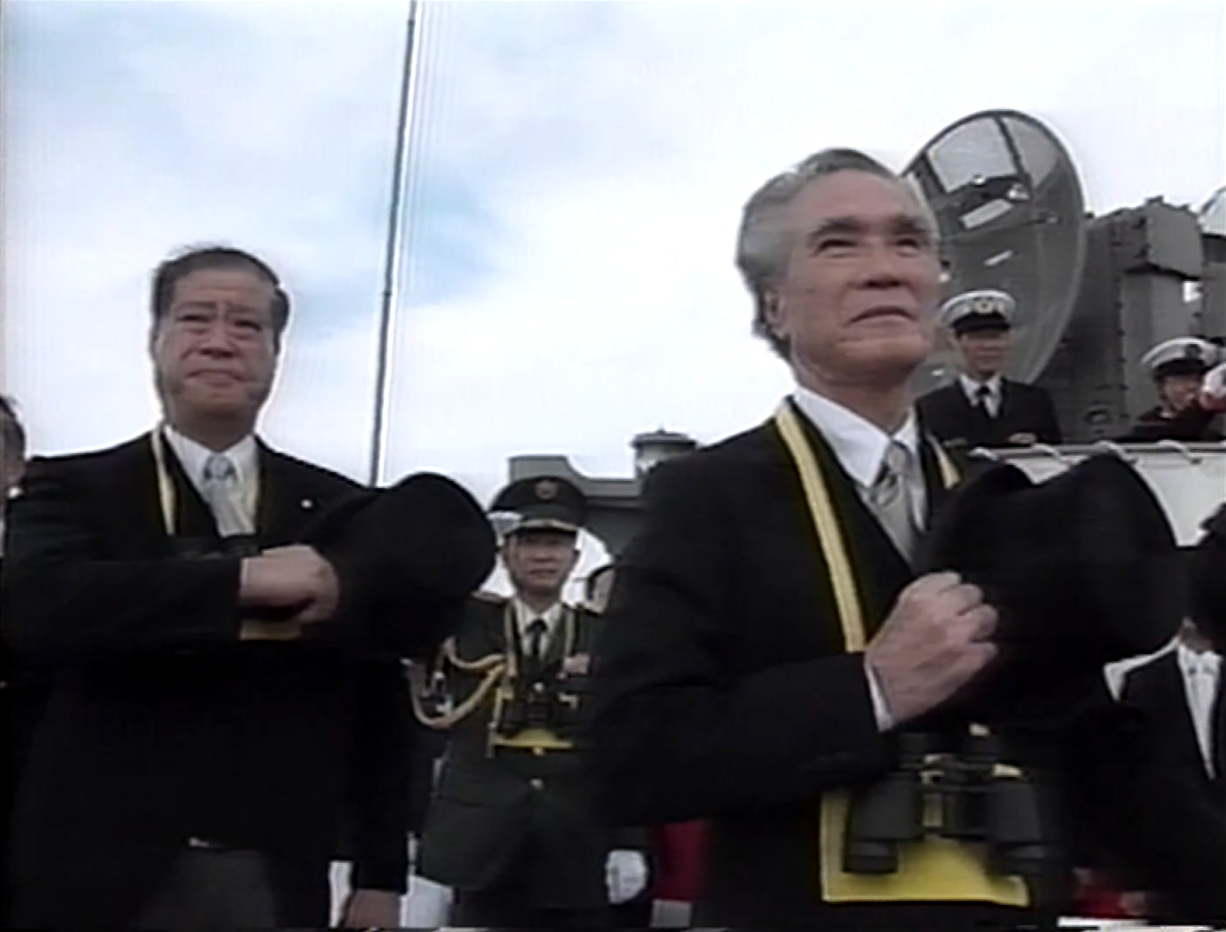
Tomiichi Murayama and Tokuichirō Tamazawa reviewed the JMSDF fleet (1994 JMSDF Fleet Review)

The Imperial Japanese Navy first hosted a fleet review in 1869. The 1940 Fleet Review, the largest in Japanese history, was held on the Yokohama coast and involved nearly 100 vessels and more than 500 aircraft. In 1957 the JMSDF resumed fleet reviews which are held about once every three years in Sagami Bay to commemorate the anniversary of its founding.

Nearly 50 warships participated in the 2006 Fleet Review which also featured live-fire missile volleys by the JMSDF. Another Fleet Review was held in 2009, and again in 2012, which featured 45 ships, including three foreign navy vessels.

=== 2015 JMSDF Fleet Review ===
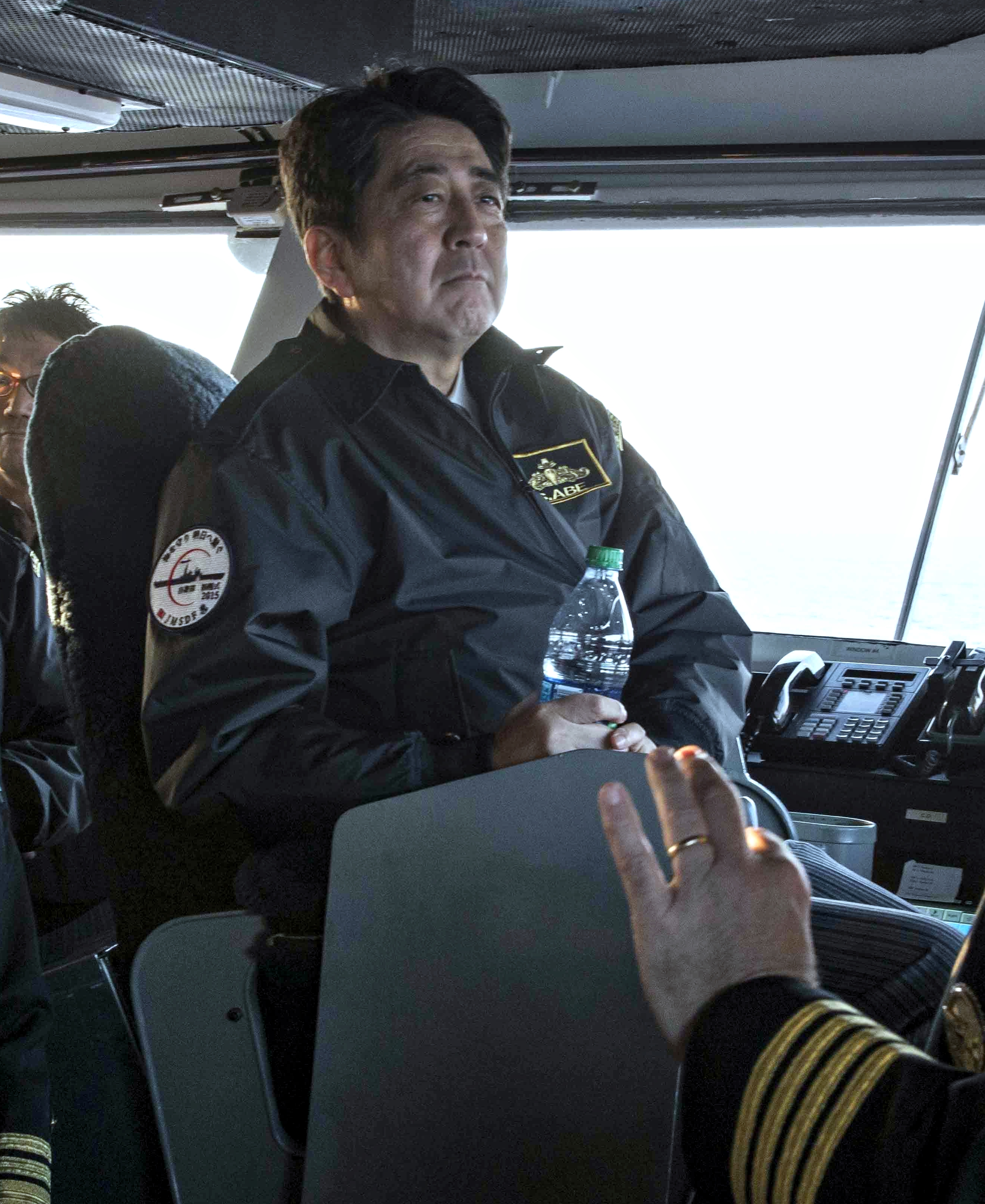
Shinzō Abe pictured aboard the bridge of USS Ronald Reagan following the 2015 Fleet Review

In addition to the JMSDF, the 2015 Fleet Review saw participation from the United States Navy, the French Navy, the Royal Australian Navy, the Republic of Korea Navy, and the Indian Navy. This marked the first attendance of a South Korean vessel since the 2002 review.

Prime Minister of Japan Shinzo Abe served as Chief Inspector of the 2015 Fleet Review and led the battle line from the bridge of the Japanese destroyer JDS Kurama. Following the review, Abe helicoptered to USS Ronald Reagan to become the first serving Japanese prime minister to board a United States Navy aircraft carrier.

=== 2018 JCG Fleet Review ===
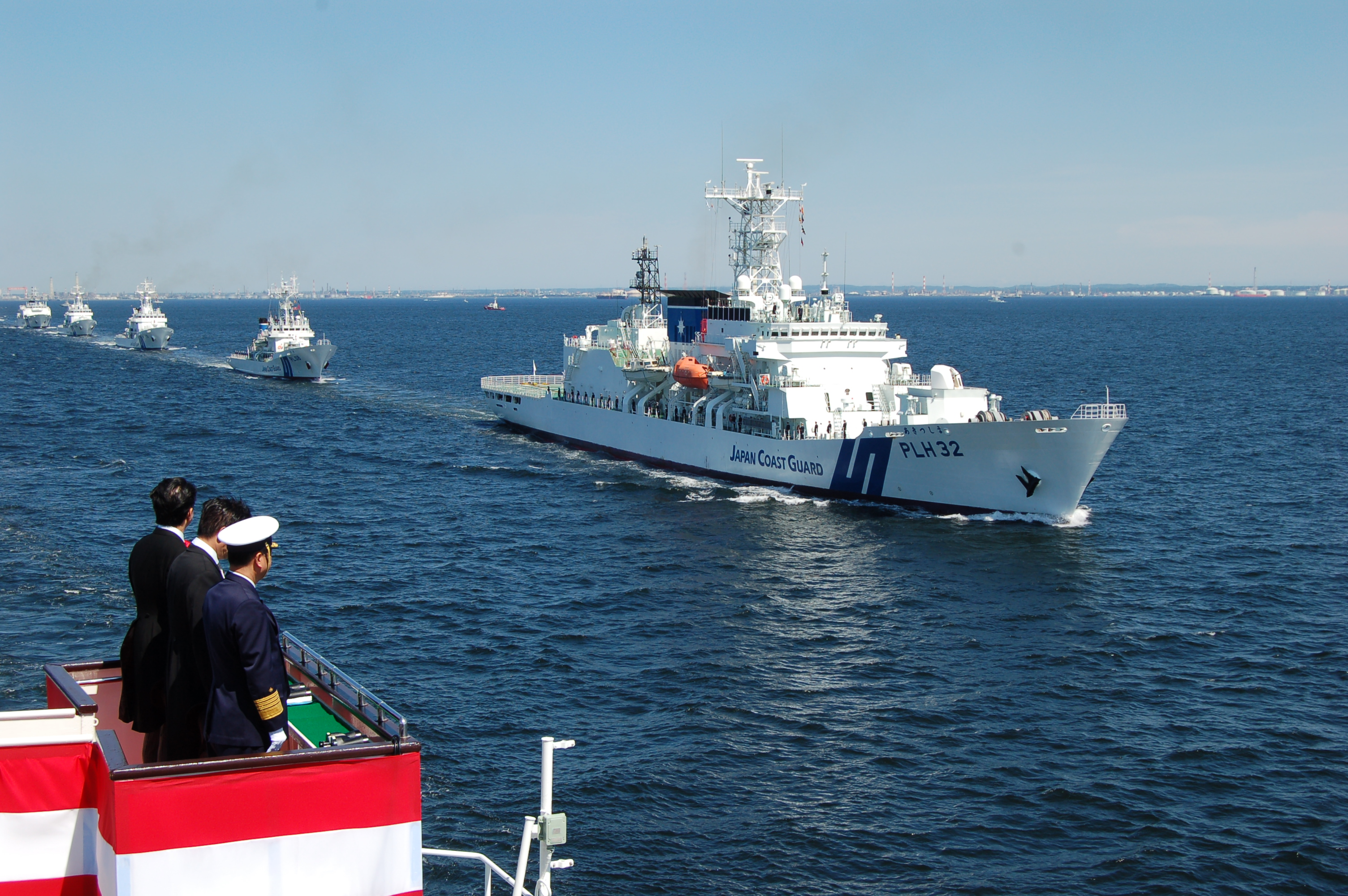
Shinzō Abe and Keiichi Ishii reviewed the JCG fleet in honor of their 70th anniversary in 2018

The JCG's 2018 fleet review saw 37 ships and 15 aircraft participating in a parade along with anti-terrorism and life-saving rescue demonstrations. They were joined by vessels from various regional police and fire departments, the U.S. Coast Guard cutter Alex Haley (WMEC-39), and the JMSDF Hatakaze (DDG-171).

The parade was led by the 6,500 ton Akitsushima (PLH-32) and included flyovers by the JCG's Dassault Falcon 900 and Gulfstream V aircraft. Princess Takamado and Princess Ayako represented the Royal Family, joining Prime Minister Shinzo Abe and Transportation Minister Keiichi Ishii aboard Japanese patrol vessel Yashima (PLH-22) to review the fleet.

The JCG typically held annual reviews, however the volume of grey-zone challenges around the Senkaku Islands has stretched the JCG's resources as they bulked up their presence in Okinawa.

Following a greater emphasis of the JCG mission in recent years, Japan returned to the tradition of holding a fleet review after 6 years without in honor of the JCG's 70th anniversary.

=== 2019 JMSDF Fleet Review ===
The Fleet Review of 2019 was scheduled for October 14 and was to mark the first-ever participation of a Chinese People's Liberation Army Navy vessel. Participation from the United States Navy, the Indian Navy, and the Royal Australian Navy was also planned.

South Korea was not invited to participate in the 2019 Fleet Review, a decision Admiral Hiroshi Yamamura said was intentional and due to the deteriorating state of Korean-Japanese relations. The previous year, Japan declined an invitation to attend South Korea's own review since it was contingent on a JMSDF warship not raising the Kyokujitsu-ki during the review, a condition with which Japan said it could not comply.

In the hours prior to the landfall of Typhoon Hagibis, American naval forces in Japan were ordered to sortie. The JMSDF ultimately canceled the 2019 Fleet Review due to widespread damage and flooding in the Tokyo area.

=== 2022 JMSDF Fleet Review ===
The Fleet Review of 2022 was held on November 6. It saw 38 ships from 13 different countries take part. The Republic of Singapore Navy (RSN) participated for the first time, sending the RSS Formidable. It was held in conjunction with the 18th Western Naval Symposium.
