= Takizawa Stone Age Site =

Archaeological site in Shibukawa, Japan

- 瀧沢石器時代遺跡 (Japanese)
- Takizawa Stone Age Site Takizawa Stone Age Site (Japan)
- 36°30′48″N 139°02′23″E
- Type: settlement
- Periods: Jōmon period
- Location: Shibukawa, Gunma, Japan
- Region: Kantō region

Site notes
- Discovered: 1926
- Public access: Yes (no public facilities)

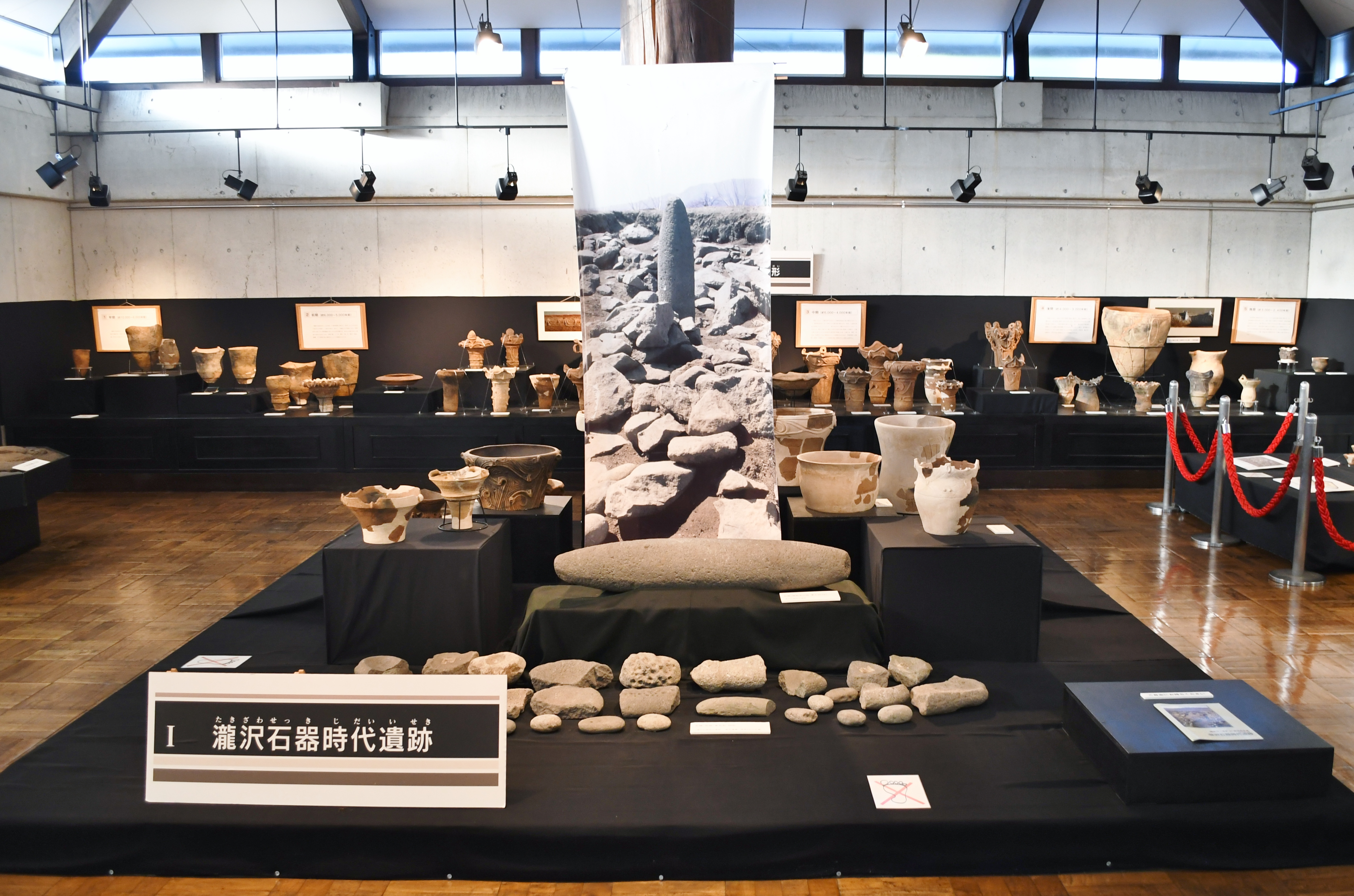
Excavated items from the Takizawa Stone Age Site

The Takizawa Stone Age Site (瀧沢石器時代遺跡, Takizawa sekki-jidai ato) is an archaeological site containing the ruins of a Jōmon period settlement located in what is now the Akagi neighborhood of the city of Shibukawa, Gunma Prefecture in the northern Kantō region of Japan. The site was designated a National Historic Site of Japan in 1927.

== Overview ==
The Takizawa site is located on a hill extending east to west of the western foot of Mount Akagi. It attracted attention because of the foundations of three pit dwellings found in 1926, along with prehistoric storage pits and other artifacts such as Jōmon pottery, stone tools and ritual objects such as clay figurines. Further archaeological excavations revealed that the settlement covered an area of 470 meters east-to-west by 170 meters north-to-south, centering on the hill, which had an abundant spring as a water source in its northeast corner. At present, the remains of 15 houses from the early to late Jōmon period have been identified, together with embankment remains and dwelling sites from the Heian period indicating centuries of continuous occupation. Also of note was the site of a stone quarry, and also of a large-scale stone circle typically found in sites much further to the north, with a diameter of over 30 meters.

The artifacts excavated are stored and displayed at the Akagi History Museum, about 10 minutes by car from Shikishima Station on the JR East Jōetsu Line. The ruins were backfilled after excavation.

== See also ==
- List of Historic Sites of Japan (Gunma)
