= Akitsushima =

Akitsushima (秋津島; lit. 'Dragonfly island') may refer to:

- The old name for the island of Honshu, and Japan as a whole.
- Two ships of the Imperial Japanese Navy have been named Akitsushima:
  - Japanese cruiser Akitsushima was a 2nd class protected cruiser, launched in 1892, and scrapped in 1927
  - Japanese seaplane tender Akitsushima was a seaplane tender or carrier, which was completed in 1942 and sunk in 1944
- The Japan Coast Guard's second Shikishima-class patrol vessel, launched in 2012, is named Akitsushima
