= Onogami Station =

Railway station in Shibukawa, Gunma Prefecture, Japan

Onogami Station 小野上駅
- Onogami Station in March 2026

General information
- Location: Murakami 3330-2, Shibukawa-shi, Gunma-ken 377-0311; Japan
- Coordinates: 36.5526°N 138.9223°E
- Operator: JR East
- Line: ■ Agatsuma Line
- Distance: 11.9 km from Shibukawa
- Platforms: 1 side + 1 island platform

Other information
- Status: Unstaffed
- Website: Official website

History
- Opened: 20 November 1945

Passengers
- FY2011: 113

Services
Preceding station	JR East	Following station
Onogami-Onsen towards Ōmae	Agatsuma Line	Ubashima towards Takasaki
Location
- Location within Gunma Prefecture Location within Japan

Onogami Station (小野上駅, Onogami-eki) is a passenger railway station in the city of Shibukawa, Gunma Prefecture, Japan, operated by East Japan Railway Company (JR East).

== Lines ==
Onogami Station is a station on the Agatsuma Line, and is located 11.9 rail kilometers from the terminus of the line at Shibukawa Station.

== Layout ==
The station is unstaffed and consists of two platforms connected by a footbridge. Platform 1 is a side platform. Platform 2 is an island platform; however, one side of the island platform is not in use.

=== Platforms ===
1	■ Agatsuma Line	for Nakanojō, Naganohara-Kusatsuguchi and Ōmae
2	■ Agatsuma Line	for Shibukawa

== History ==
Onogami Station was opened on 20 November 1945. The station was absorbed into the JR East network upon the privatization of the Japanese National Railways (JNR) on 1 April 1987.

== Surrounding area ==
- Onogami Onsen
