= Ubashima Station =

Railway station in Shibukawa, Gunma Prefecture, Japan

Ubashima Station 祖母島駅
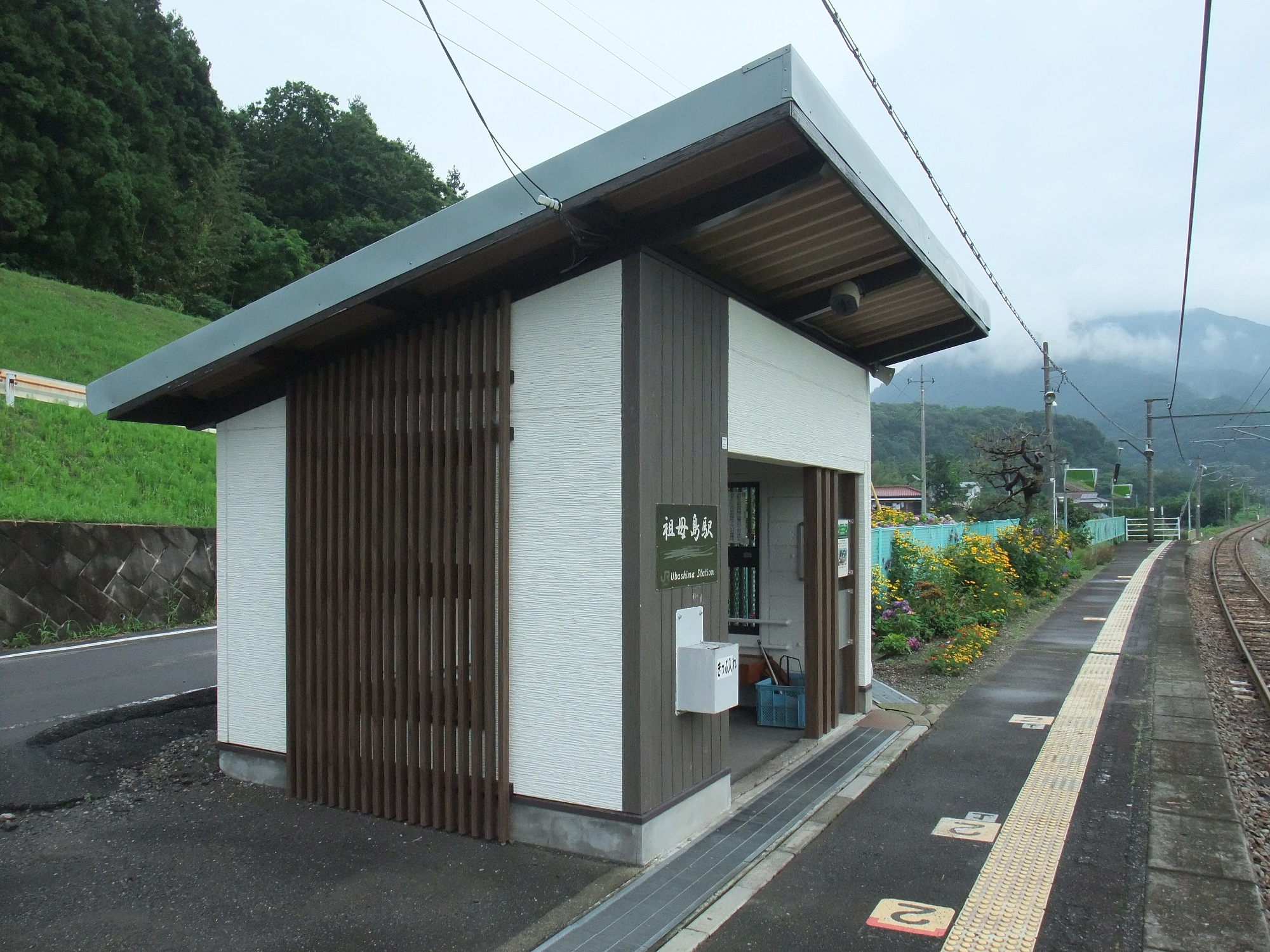
- Ubashima Station, July 2012

General information
- Location: Ubashima 292, Shibukawa-shi, Gunma-ken 377-0024; Japan
- Coordinates: 36.5407°N 138.9573°E
- Operator: JR East
- Line: ■ Agatsuma Line
- Distance: 7.7 km from Shibukawa
- Platforms: 1 side platform

Other information
- Status: Unstaffed
- Website: Official website

History
- Opened: 10 February 1959

Passengers
- FY2011: 17

Services
Preceding station	JR East	Following station
Onogami towards Ōmae	Agatsuma Line	Kanashima towards Takasaki
Location
- Location within Gunma Prefecture Location within Japan

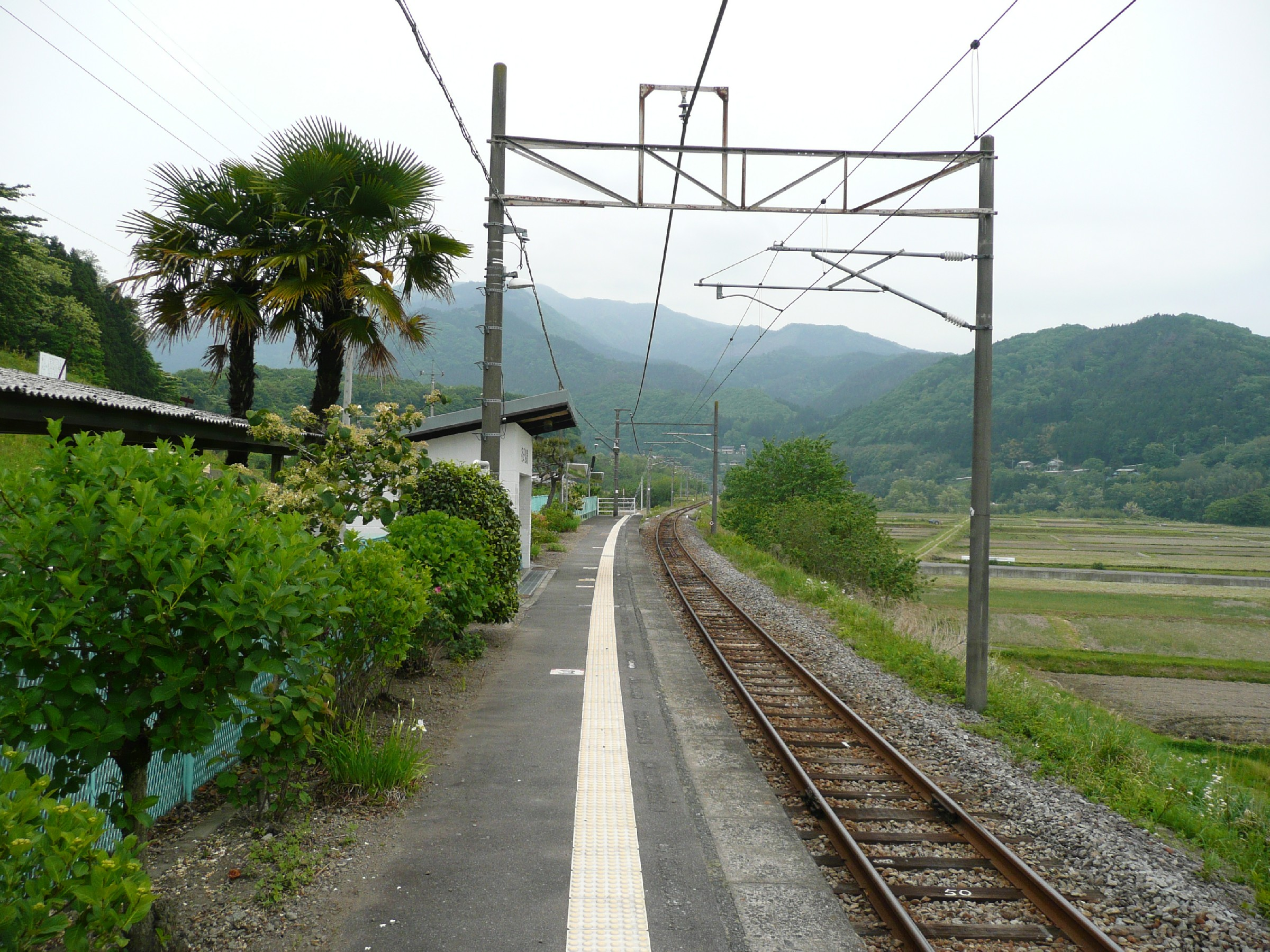
Ubashima Station platform

Ubashima Station (祖母島駅, Ubashima-eki) is a passenger railway station in the city of Shibukawa, Gunma Prefecture, Japan, operated by East Japan Railway Company (JR East).

== Lines ==
Ubashima Station is a station on the Agatsuma Line, and is located 7.7 rail kilometers from the terminus of the line at Shibukawa Station.

== Station layout ==
The station consists of a single side platform. The station is unattended.

== History ==
Ubashima Station was opened on 10 February 1959. The station was absorbed into the JR East network upon the privatization of the Japanese National Railways (JNR) on 1 April 1987.

== Surrounding area ==
- Agatsuma River
