= Onogami-Onsen Station =

Railway station in Shibukawa, Gunma Prefecture, Japan

Onogami-Onsen Station 小野上温泉駅
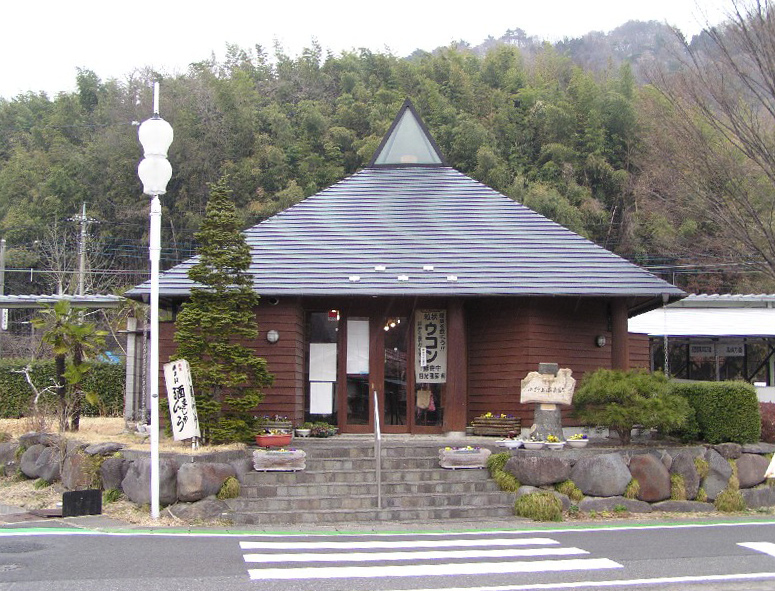
- Onogami-Onsen Station in March 2004

General information
- Location: 376-1 Shiokawa, Shibukawa-shi, Gunma-ken 377-0311; Japan
- Coordinates: 36°33′25″N 138°54′16″E
- Operator: JR East
- Line: ■ Agatsuma Line
- Distance: 13.7 km from Shibukawa
- Platforms: 1 side platform

Other information
- Status: Unstaffed
- Website: Official website

History
- Opened: 14 March 1992

Passengers
- FY2011: 31

Services
Preceding station	JR East	Following station
Ichishiro towards Ōmae	Agatsuma Line	Onogami towards Takasaki
Location
- Location within Gunma Prefecture Location within Japan

Onogami-Onsen Station (小野上温泉駅, Onogami-Onsen-eki) is a passenger railway station in the city of Shibukawa, Gunma Prefecture, Japan, operated by East Japan Railway Company (JR East).

== Lines ==
Onogami-Onsen Station is a station on the Agatsuma Line, and is located 13.7 kilometers from the terminus of the line at Shibukawa Station.

== Station layout ==
The station consists of one side platform serving a single track. The station is unattended.

== History ==
Onogami-Onsen Station opened on 14 March 1992.

== Surrounding area ==
- Onogami Onsen

== See also ==
- List of railway stations in Japan
