= Japanese patrol vessel Asazuki =

Shikishima-class patrol vessel of Japanese Coast Guard

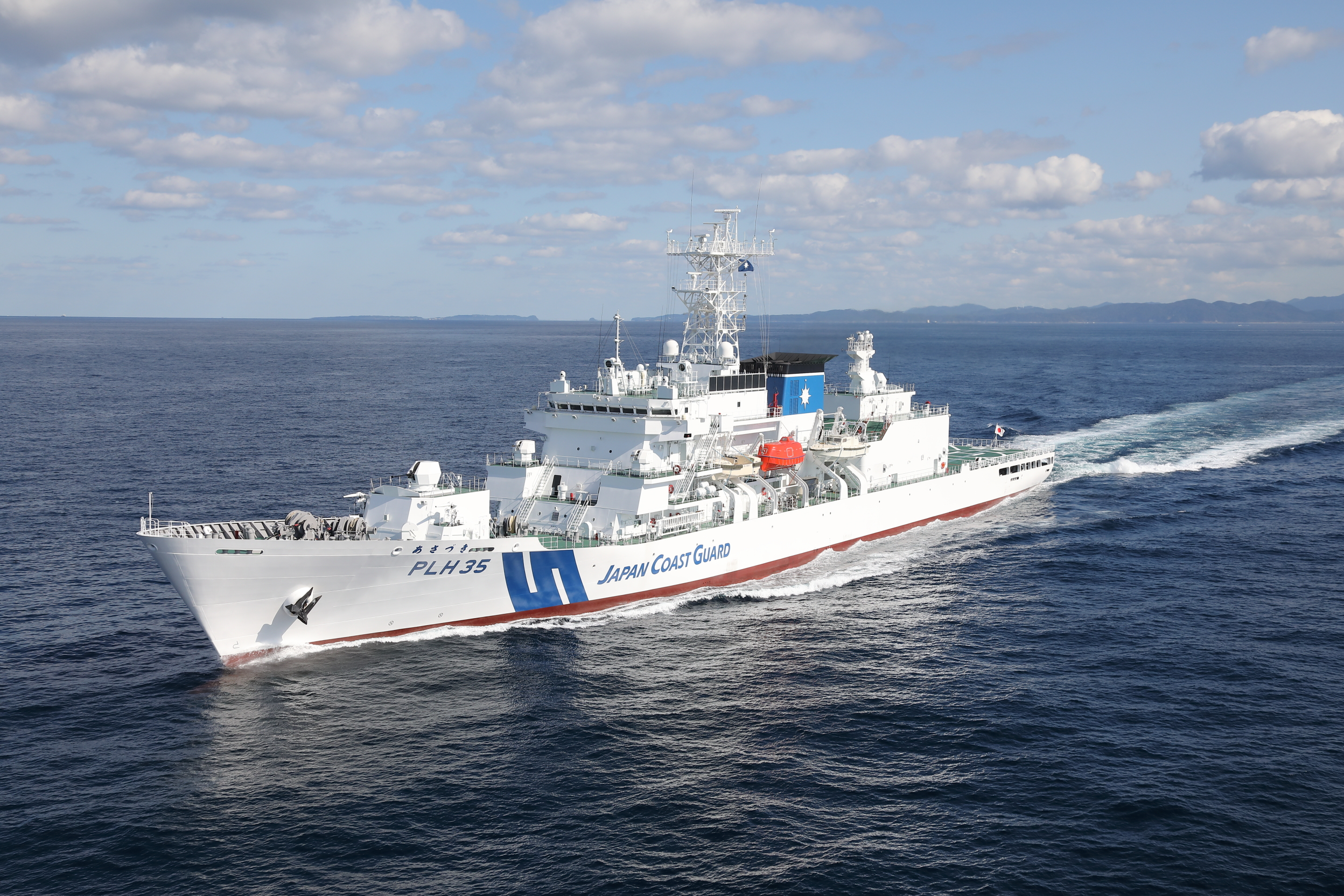
- Asazuki underway on 26 October 2021

History

Japan
- Name: Asazuki; (あさづき)
- Builder: Mitsubishi, Shimonoseki
- Cost: 26.2 billion ¥
- Laid down: 25 February 2019
- Launched: 15 December 2020
- Commissioned: 12 November 2021
- Identification: Pennant number: PLH-35; IMO number: 9860855
- Status: Active

General characteristics
- Class & type: Reimei-class patrol vessel
- Tonnage: approx. 7,300 GT
- Length: 150.0 m (492 ft 2 in)
- Beam: 17 m (55 ft 9 in)
- Draft: 9.0 m (29 ft 6 in)
- Propulsion: 2 × shafts; 4 × diesel engines
- Speed: 25 knots (46 km/h; 29 mph)
- Armament: 2 × Bofors 40 mm gun; 2 × JM61 20 mm guns
- Aircraft carried: 2 × EC225LP helicopters

Asazuki (PLH-35) is a Reimei-class patrol vessel currently operated by the Japanese Coast Guard.

== Design ==
Reimei-class carries two 40 mm autocanon and two JM61 20 mm machine guns, as does the Akitsushima. Gun mounts of 40 mm autocanons are changed to Mk4, which is lighter than the Mk3 mounted on the Akitsushima. Both are capable of being remotely controlled with optical directors.

Aviation facilities are also similar to that of Akitsushima, capable of carrying two EC225LP Super Puma helicopters: however, only one helicopter is normally carried on this vessel.

== Construction and career ==
Asazuki was laid down on 25 February 2019 and launched on 15 December 2020 by Mitsubishi, Shimonoseki. She was commissioned on 12 November 2021.
