= Kanashima Station =

Railway station in Shibukawa, Gunma Prefecture, Japan

Kanashima Station 金島駅
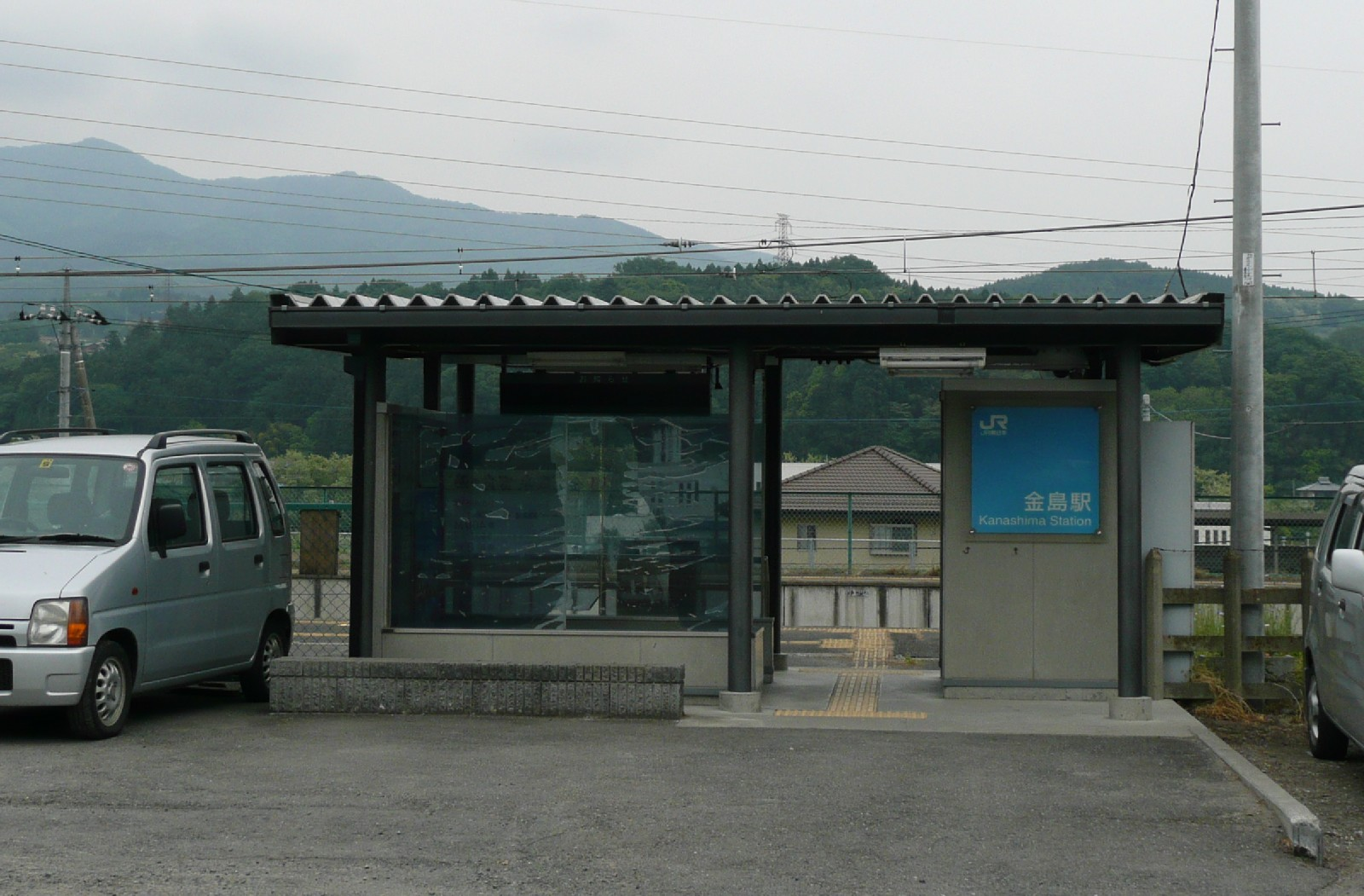
- Kanashima Station, May 2009

General information
- Location: Kawashima 196, Shibukawa-shi, Gunma-ken 377-0025; Japan
- Coordinates: 36°31′46″N 138°58′35″E
- Operator: JR East
- Line: ■ Agatsuma Line
- Distance: 5.5 km from Shibukawa
- Platforms: 2 side platforms

Other information
- Status: Unstaffed
- Website: Official website

History
- Opened: 5 August 1959

Passengers
- FY2011: 199

Services
Preceding station	JR East	Following station
Ubashima towards Ōmae	Agatsuma Line	Shibukawa towards Takasaki
Location
- Location within Gunma Prefecture Location within Japan

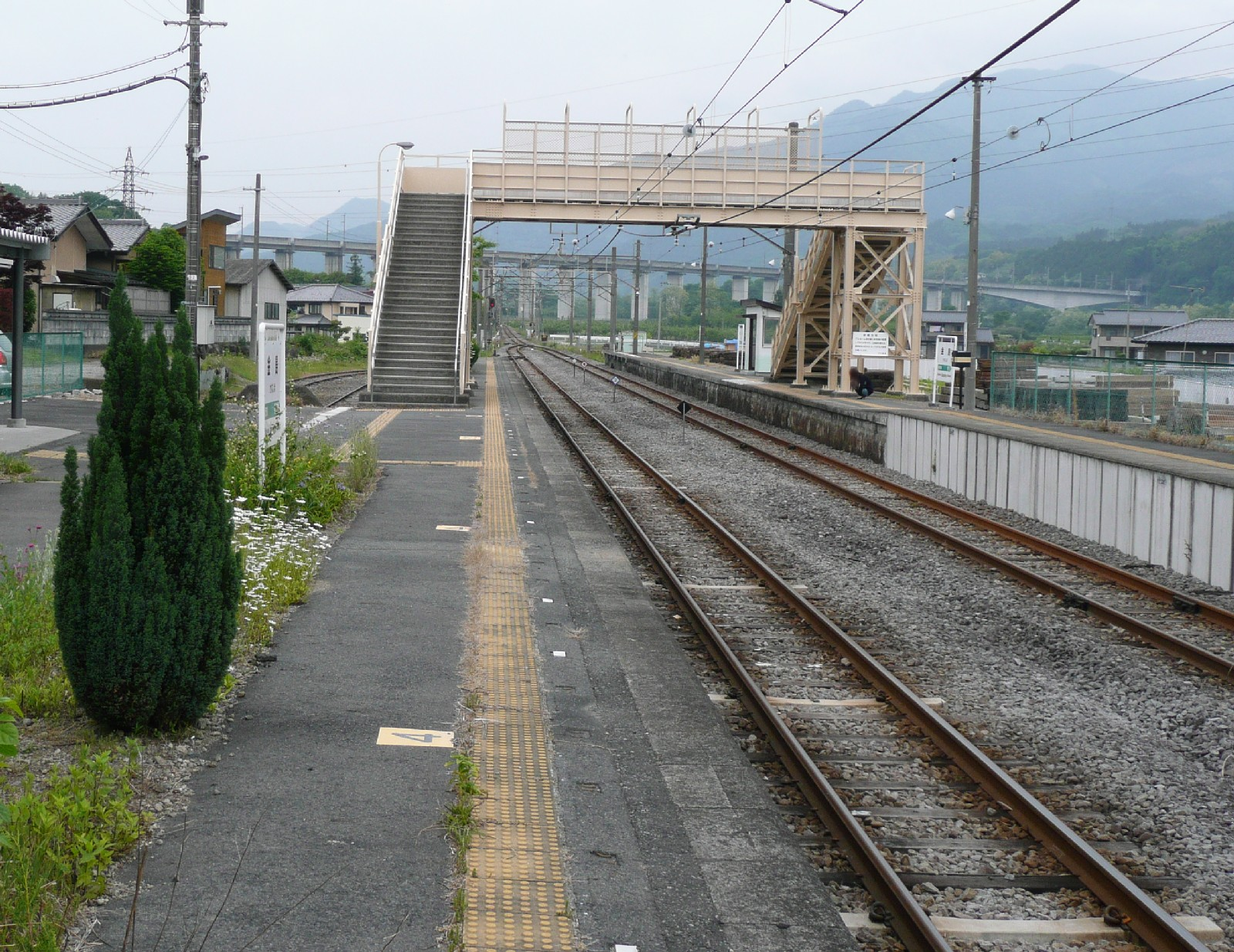
https://timetables.jreast.co.jp/en/timetable/list0460.htmlhttps://timetables.jreast.co.jp/en/timetable/list0460.htmlhttps://timetables.jreast.co.jp/en/timetable/list0460.htmlKanashima Station platform

Kanashima Station (金島駅, Kanashima-eki) is a passenger railway station in the city of Shibukawa, Gunma Prefecture, Japan, operated by East Japan Railway Company (JR East).

== Lines ==
Kanashima Station is a station on the Agatsuma Line, and is located 5.5 rail kilometers from the terminus of the line at Shibukawa Station.

== Station layout ==
The station has two opposed side platforms connected by a footbridge. The station is unattended.

=== Platforms ===
1	■ Agatsuma Line	forNakanojo, Naganohara-Kusatsuguchi, Manza-Kazawaguchi
2	■ Agatsuma Line	for Shibukawa and Takasaki

== History ==
Kanashima Station was opened on 5 August 1959. The station was absorbed into the JR East network upon the privatization of the Japanese National Railways (JNR) on 1 April 1987.

== Surrounding area ==
- Agatsuma River
- Kanashima Onsen
