= Yagihara Station =

Railway station in Shibukawa, Gunma Prefecture, Japan

Yagihara Station 八木原駅
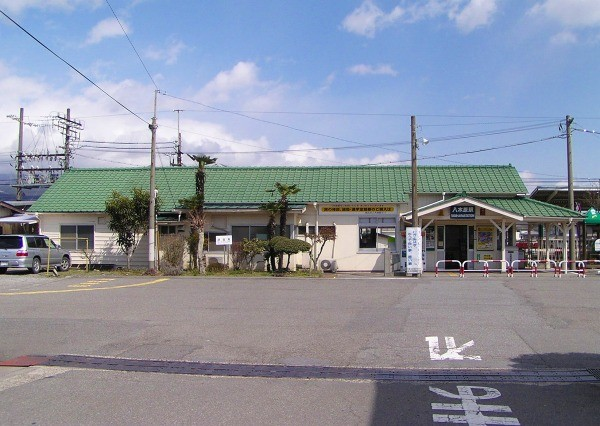
- Yagihara Station, October 2006

General information
- Location: Yagihara 1145, Shibukawa-shi, Gunma-ken 377-0003; Japan
- Coordinates: 36.4639°N 139.0191°E
- Operator: JR East
- Line: ■ Jōetsu Line
- Distance: 17.7 km from Takasaki
- Platforms: 1 side + 1 island platform

Other information
- Status: Staffed
- Website: Official website

History
- Opened: 1 July 1921; 105 years ago

Passengers
- FY2019: 1080

Services
| Preceding station | JR East | Following station |
|---|---|---|
| Gumma-Sōja towards Takasaki | Jōetsu Line | Shibukawa towards Nagaoka |
| Gumma-Sōja towards Takasaki | Agatsuma Line | Shibukawa towards Ōmae |
Location
- Location within Gunma Prefecture Location within Japan

Yagihara Station (八木原駅, Yagihara-eki) is a passenger railway station in the city of Shibukawa, Gunma, Japan, operated by the East Japan Railway Company (JR East).

== Lines ==
Yagihara Station is a station on the Jōetsu Line, and is located 17.7 kilometers from the starting point of the line at Takasaki. Trains of the Agatsuma Line also stop at this station en route to Takasaki past the nominal terminus of the line at Shibukawa.

== Station layout ==
The station has a single side platform and a single island platform connected to the station building by a footbridge; however, only one side of the island platform is in use. The station is staffed.

=== Platforms ===
| 1 | ■ Jōetsu Line | for Shibukawa and Minakami |
| 1 | ■ Agatsuma Line | for Nakanojō, Naganohara-Kusatsuguchi |
| 3 | ■ Jōetsu Line | for Shin-Maebashi, Takasaki |
| 3 | ■ Agatsuma Line | for Shin-Maebashi, Takasaki |

== History ==
Yagihara Station opened on 1 July 1921. Upon the privatization of the Japanese National Railways (JNR) on 1 April 1987, it came under the control of JR East.

== Passenger statistics ==
In fiscal 2019, the station was used by an average of 1080 passengers daily (boarding passengers only).

== Surrounding area ==
- Furumaki Elementary School
- Furumaki Junior High School
- Shibukawa Yagihara Post Office
- National Route 17

== See also ==
- List of railway stations in Japan
