= Japanese patrol vessel Akitsushima =

Shikishima-class patrol vessel

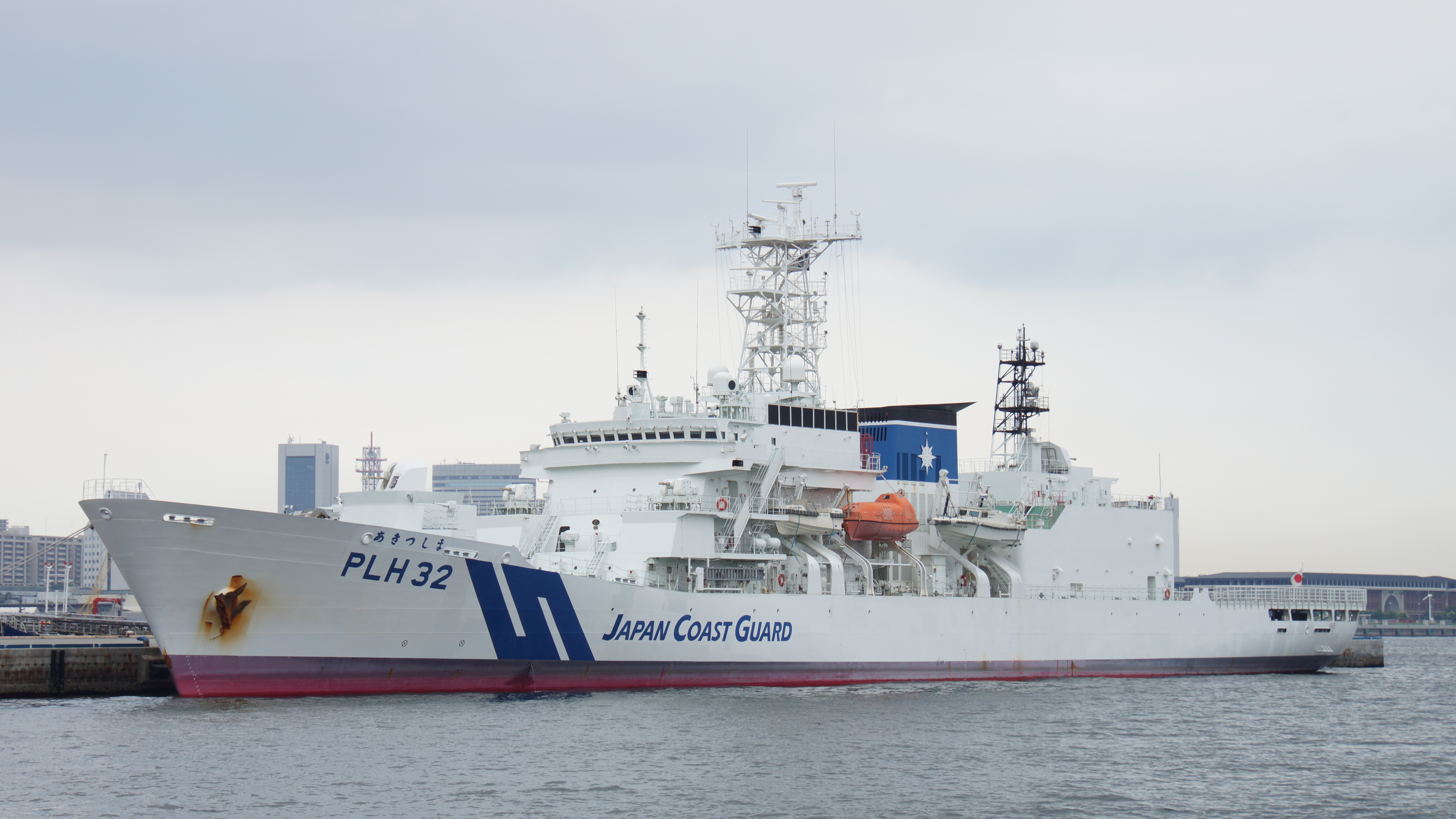
- Akitsushima in Kobe on 9 July 2017

History

Japan
- Name: Akitsushima; (あきつしま)
- Namesake: Classical name of Japan
- Builder: IHI, Tokyo
- Laid down: 10 May 2011
- Launched: 4 July 2012
- Commissioned: 28 November 2013
- Home port: Yokohama
- Identification: IMO number: 9638068; MMSI number: 431004594; Callsign: 7JNE; Pennant number: PLH-32
- Status: Active

General characteristics
- Class & type: Akitsushima-class patrol vessel
- Tonnage: 6,500 GT
- Displacement: 9,300 tons (full load)
- Length: 150.0 m (492 ft 2 in)
- Beam: 17 m (55 ft 9 in)
- Draft: 9.0 m (29 ft 6 in)
- Propulsion: 2 × shafts; 4 × IHI-SEMT Pielstick 16 PC2.5 V400 diesel engines
- Speed: 25 knots (46 km/h; 29 mph)
- Range: 20,000 nmi (37,000 km; 23,000 mi)
- Armament: 2 × Bofors 40 mm gun; 2 × JM61 20 mm gun
- Aircraft carried: 2 × EC225LP helicopters

Akitsushima (PLH-32) is a Akitsushima-class patrol vessel currently operated by the Japanese Coast Guard.

== Design ==
This vessel is an enlarged and updated version of the earlier Shikishima. Aviation facilities have also been enhanced: whereas Shikishima is carrying Eurocopter AS332 helicopters, this vessel is able to carry the larger EC225LP Super Puma.

Weapons have also been updated and enhanced. As for the large calibre autocanon, the vessel is equipped with two single-mounted Bofors L/70 40 mm guns, as opposed to the double-mounted Oerlikon L/90 35mm guns of the Shikishima. These autocanons are the same as those carried by the Aso-class and Hida-class, and are capable of precision firing with an optical director. The JM61 20 mm guns are also upgraded to the production version as the other vessels, while the Shikishima is equipped with the earlier prototypes.

== Construction and career ==
Akitsushima was laid down on 10 May 2011 and launched on 4 July 2012 by IHI, Tokyo. She was commissioned on 28 November 2013.

In 2015, during the Emperor's and Empress's visit (行幸啓, Gyōkōkei) to Palau, Akitsushima was used as an accommodation ship. Slopes and handrails were set up so that both elderly Majesties could get on board comfortably.

== Gallery ==
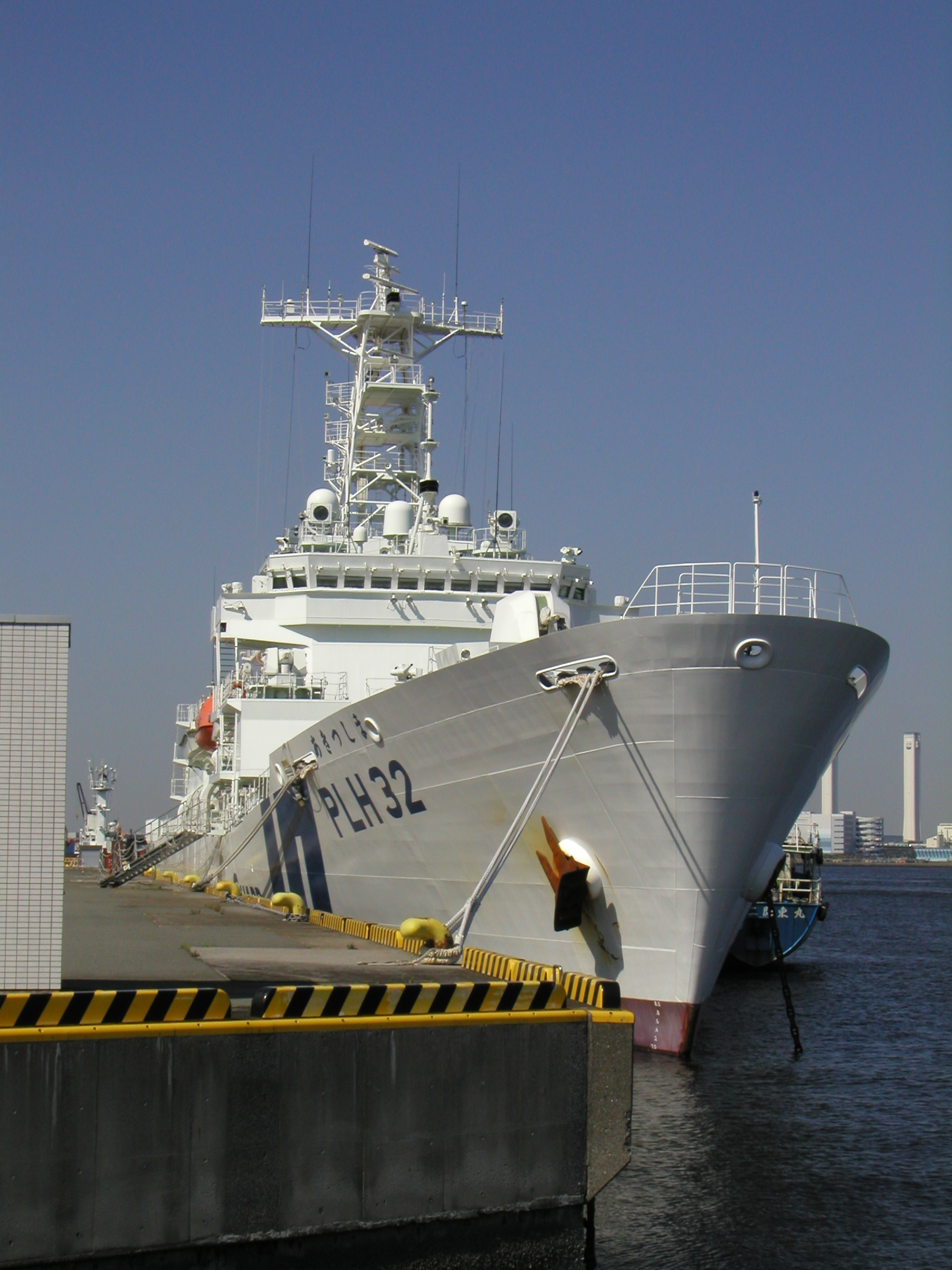
Akitsushima in Yokohama on 4 June 2015

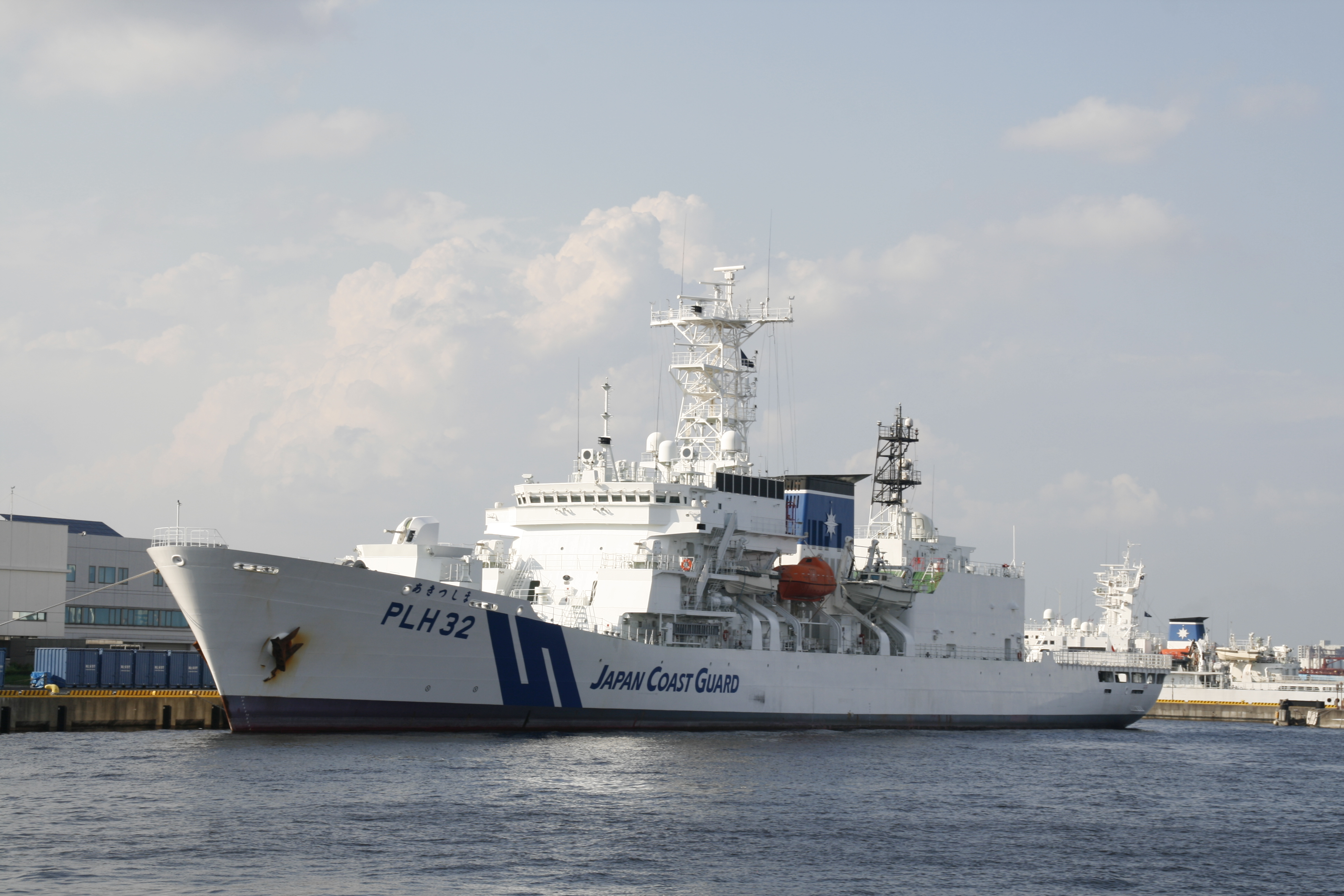
Akitsushima in Yokohama on 15 August 2015

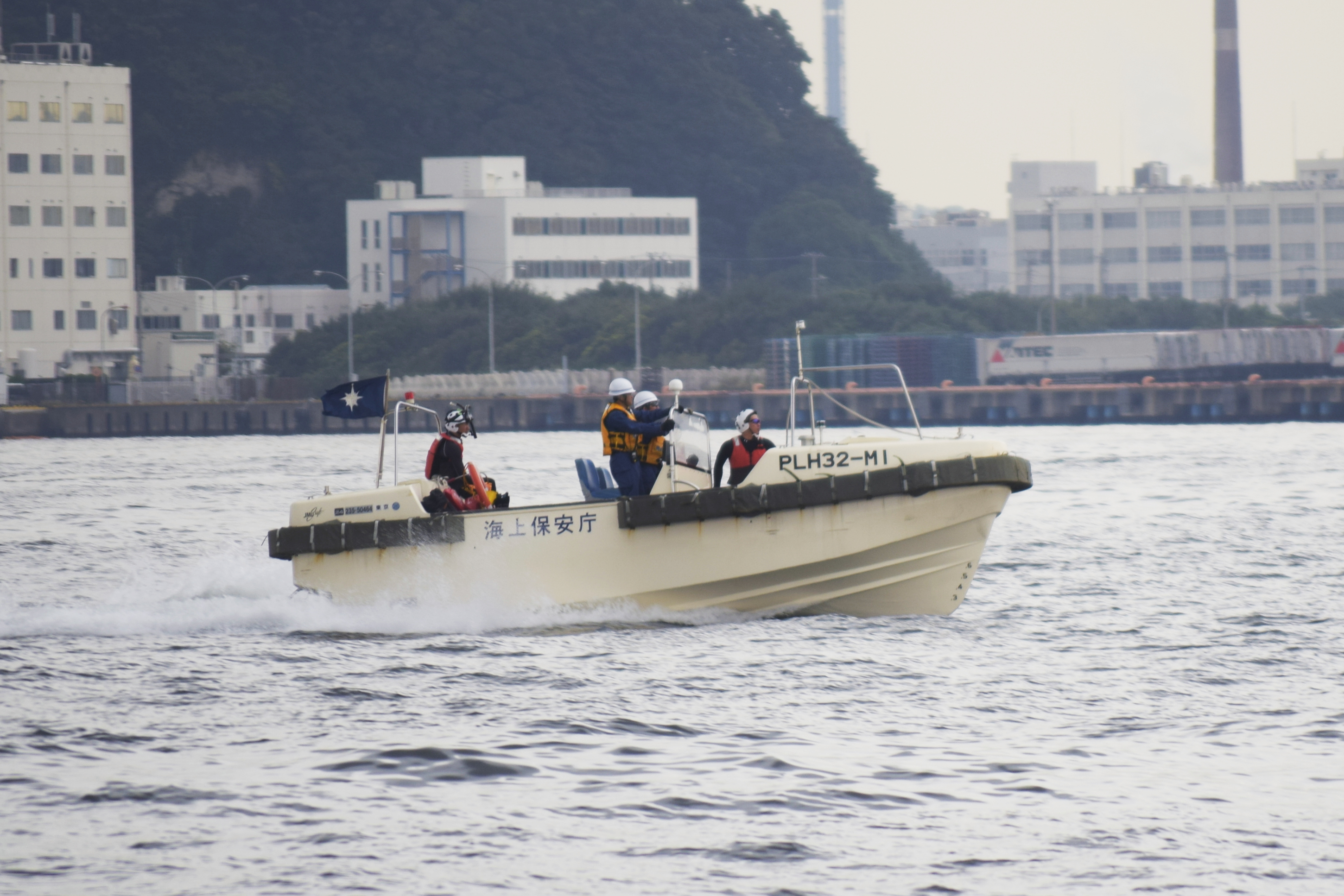
Akitsushima''s patrol boat on 1 October 2015

Akitsushima in Yokohama on 18 December 2016

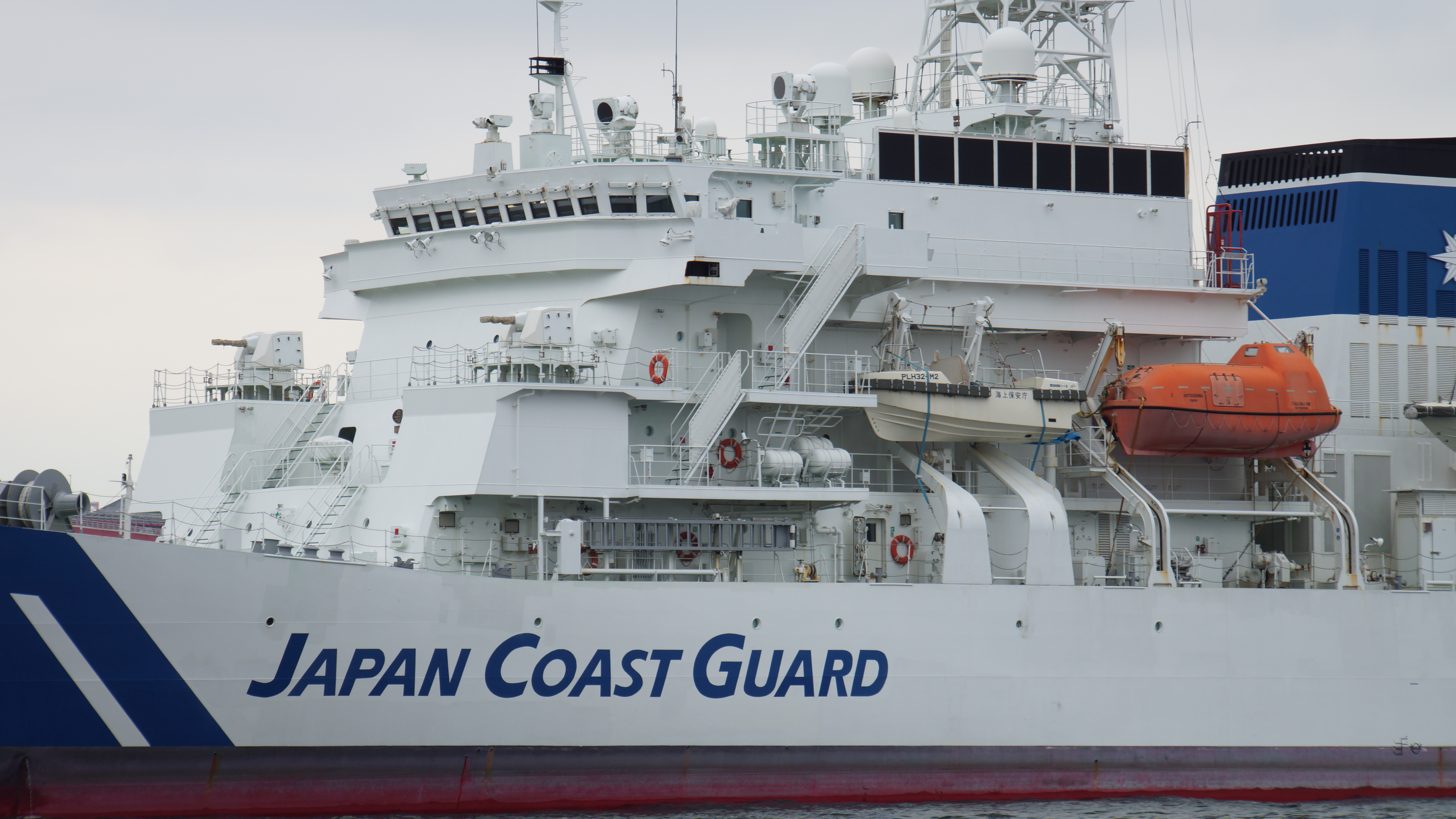
Akitsushima in Kobe on 9 July 2017

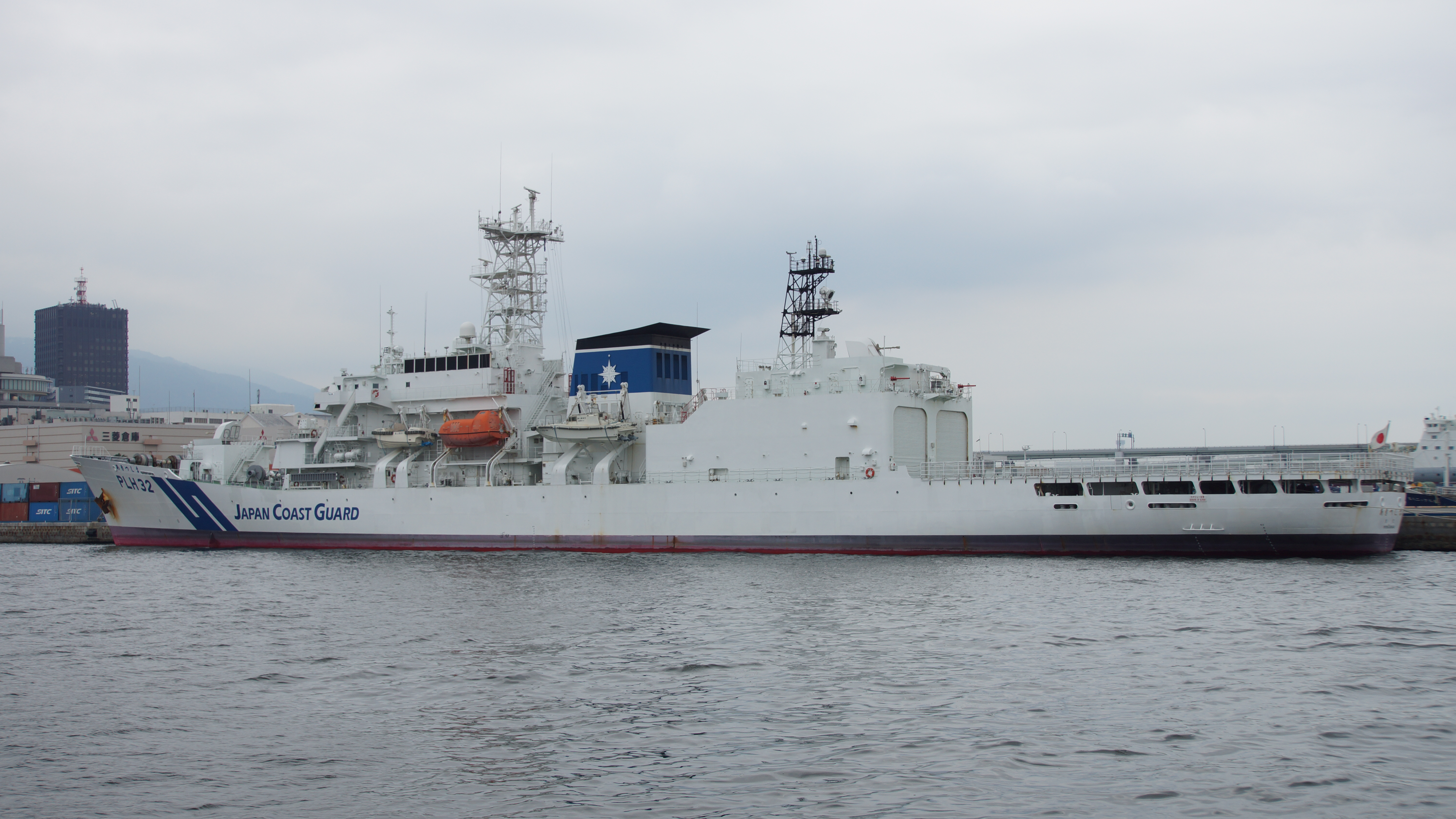
Akitsushima in Kobe on 9 July 2017

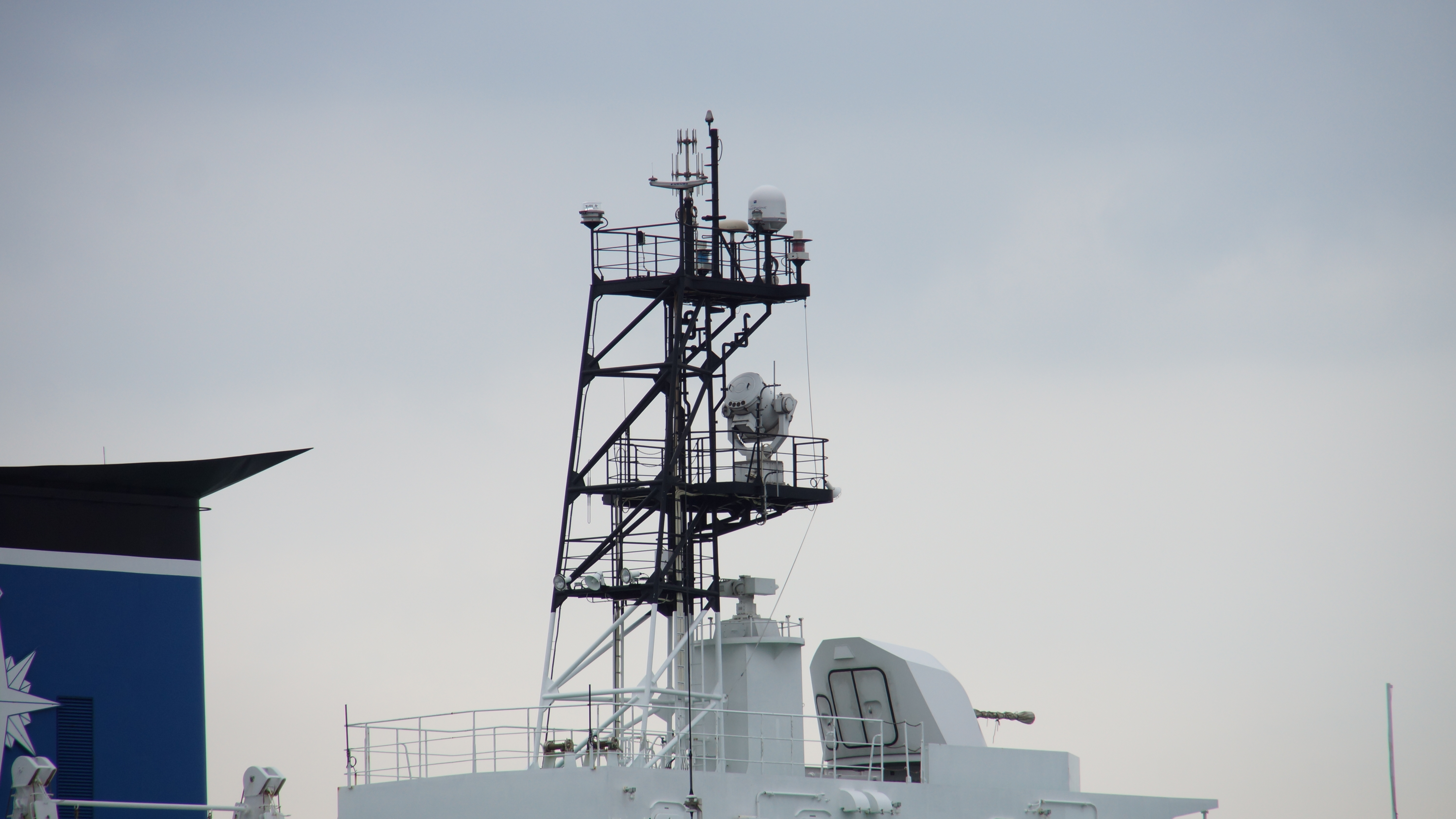
Akitsushima in Kobe on 9 July 2017

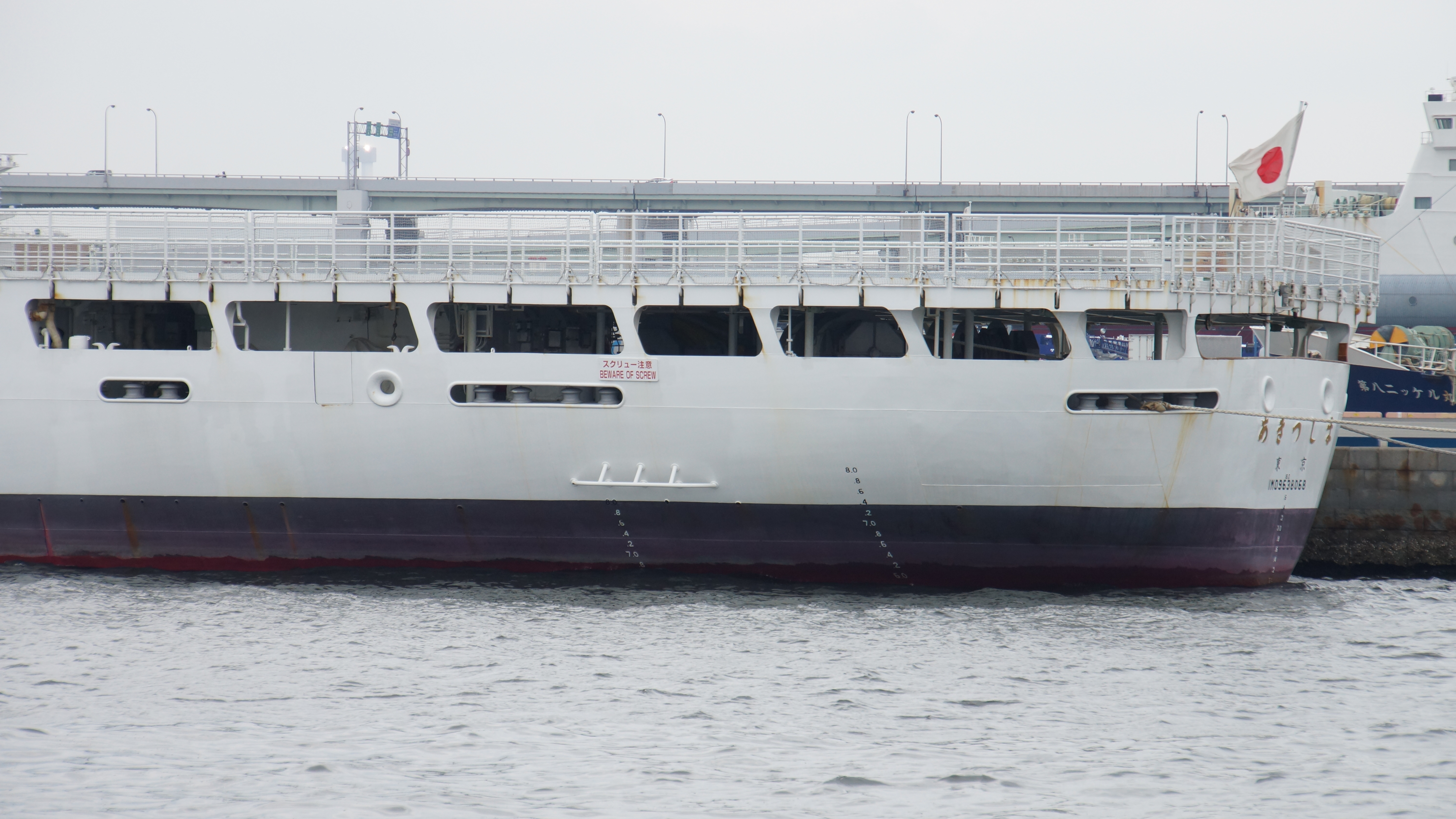
Akitsushima in Kobe on 9 July 2017
