= Shikishima-class patrol vessel =

Patrol vessels of the Japan Coast Guard

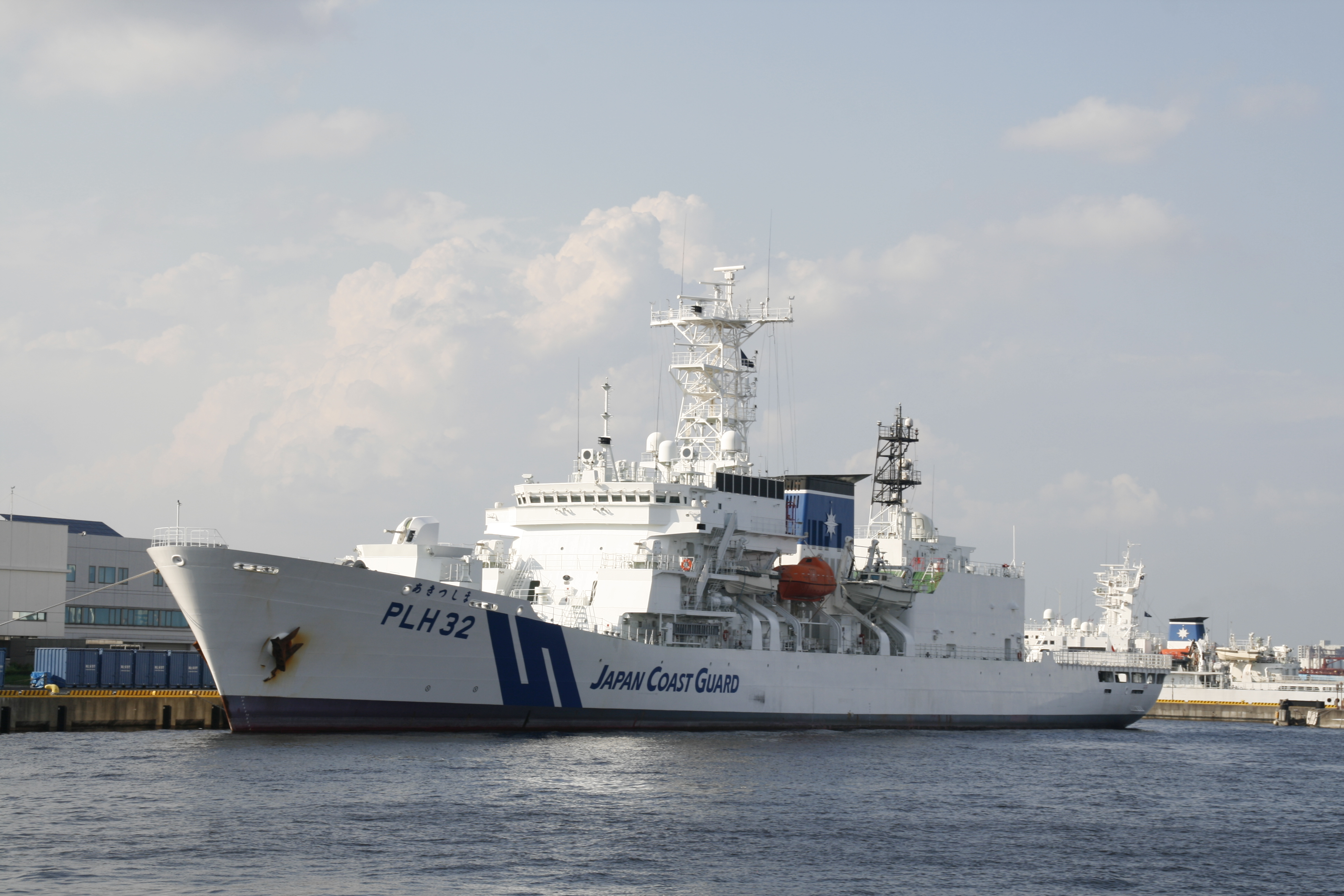
- Akitsushima

Class overview
- Name: Shikishima-class large patrol vessel
- Builders: Ishikawajima-Harima Heavy Industries
- Operators: Japan Coast Guard; (former Maritime Safety Agency)
- Preceded by: Mizuho class
- Succeeded by: Shunkō class
- Subclasses: Shikishima; Akitsushima; Reimei class
- Planned: 6
- Building: 0
- Completed: 6
- Active: 5

General characteristics of Shikishima
- Type: PLH (Patrol vessel Large with Helicopter)
- Tonnage: 6,500 GT
- Displacement: 9,300 tons (full load)
- Length: 150.0 m (492 ft 2 in)
- Beam: 16.5 m (54 ft 2 in)
- Draft: 9.0 m (29 ft 6 in)
- Propulsion: 2 × shafts; 4 × IHI-SEMT Pielstick 16 PC2.5 V400 diesel engines
- Speed: 25 knots (46 km/h; 29 mph)
- Range: 20,000 nmi (37,000 km; 23,000 mi)
- Sensors & processing systems: OPS-14 2D Air search; MS 1596 navigation radar; JMA 8303 surface search radar
- Armament: 2 × Oerlikon 35 mm twin cannon; 2 × JM61 20 mm gun
- Aircraft carried: 2 × Eurocopter AS332

The Shikishima-class patrol vessel (しきしま級巡視船, Shikishima-kyū-junnshi-senn) is a class of PLH type patrol vessels of the Japan Coast Guard (JCG; former Maritime Safety Agency, MSA). In the official classification, Shikishima and Akitsushima are treated as the only ships in their classes, respectively; and Reimei is treated as the lead ship of her class. The Shikishima class was once the world's largest armed coast guard cutter until it was surpassed by the Chinese Zhaotou-class patrol cutter in 2015.

== Backgrounds ==
Spent nuclear fuel generated at the nuclear power plants in Japan has been processed at nuclear reprocessing plants in Britain and France, into plutonium and radioactive waste. Then, according to the plan of power generation with the MOX fuel, the Government of Japan decided to transport this plutonium back to Japan.

In the first transportation from France in 1984, armed JMSA officers were on board the ship to counter maritime hijacking. A second transportation operation was planned in the early 1990s, but due to the revision of the Japan-U.S. Nuclear power agreement in 1988, it was requested to strengthen the security system and the JMSA was to escort with a special tactical team (one of the ancestors of the Special Security Team) and a patrol vessel. On existing patrol boats, however, it was difficult to complete an escort operation with no port of call. For this operation, the JMSA developed Shikishima under the FY 1989 program as an escort ship with a high endurance and enhanced surveillance capability.

Although the transportation of plutonium was not carried out thereafter, Shikishima has been valuable as a large offshore platform that can be used for various security matters and long-distance rescue. As construction cost was expensive, construction of sister ships was not realized easily, but in the 2000s, in order to emphasize countermeasures against the piracy problems of the Malacca Strait and the Somali coast, the Senkaku Islands issue, conservation of marine interests In response to the change, construction was considered again. In response, the second ship constructed in the 2010 fiscal year plan was Akitsushima.

== Design ==
Like preceding PLHs, they have a long forecastle, but its internal structure is strengthened that the level of vulnerability resistance is comparable to warship standard. Bulletproof of the bridge structure is pretty much taken into consideration, polycarbonate bulletproof glass is prepared inside the window, metal fittings for the ballistic board are also attached to the outer wall.

Shikishima is the only JCG vessel equipped with anti-air radar and Oerlikon 35 mm twin cannons to enhance anti-air capability whereas preceding patrol vessels have only surface-search and navigation radars and a single-mounted 35 mm or L/60 40 mm autocanon. And as a secondary weapon, two JM61 20 mm gun systems were set up. This system adopts the same rotary cannon as the conventional JM61-M, but it is remotely controlled with an optical director as opposed to JM61-M being manually trained and elevated. It derived from one of the PG-821-class guided-missile patrol boats of the JMSDF, and later, added as a standard equipment of the JCG as the JM61-RFS. In Akitsushima, L/70 40 mm autocanons are introduced in combination with Bofors Mk. 3 single-mounted turrets, instead of 35 mm twin cannons. In Reimei-class that followed, lighter Mk. 4 turrets are introduced.

Aviation facilities have also been enhanced. In Shikishima, two Eurocopter AS332 Super Puma helicopters are deployed as the shipboard helicopters, whereas the conventional PLHs are equipped with smaller Bell 212. The air facilities of Akitsushima are further expanded to operate an even larger EC225LP, which is also followed by the Reimei-class.

== In service ==
At present, she is frequently sent on long cruises to Southeast Asia to foster international cooperation against piracy in the Strait of Malacca. She is also assigned to the policing mission of Senkaku Islands because of her cruising capability.

In 2015, during the Emperor's and Empress's visit (行幸啓, Gyōkōkei) to Palau, Akitsushima was used as an accommodation ship. Slopes and handrails were set up so that both elderly Majesties could get on board comfortably.

Due to the increased activities of the China Coast Guard and the introduction of the Zhaotou class, the Japan Coast Guard procured three additional Shikishima-class vessels between 2016 and 2018 due to the need to "strengthen security around the Senkaku islands".

The Shikishima made a port call in Manila on October 17, 2026 for an anti-piracy exercise.

== Ships in the class ==
Hull no.	Name	Laid down	Launched	Commissioned	Decommissioned	Homeport	Notes
PLH 31	Shikishima	August 24, 1990	June 27, 1991	April 8, 1992	April 15, 2024	Kagoshima	Shikishima's hull number and name is succeeded by a Reimei-class subtype.
PLH 32	Akitsushima	May 10, 2011	July 4, 2012	November 28, 2013		Yokohama	Slightly enlarged and improved variant of Shikishima's design.
Reimei subclass
PLH 33	Reimei	June 7, 2017	March 8, 2019	February 19, 2020		Kagoshima	The Reimei-subclass represents a more mature development of Akitsushima's design.
PLH 34	Akatsuki	February 16, 2018	April 10, 2020	February 16, 2021		Kagoshima	
PLH 35	Asazuki	February 25, 2019	December 15, 2020	November 12, 2021		Ishigaki	
PLH 31	Shikishima	2022	March 13, 2024	March 3, 2025		Kagoshima	

== See also ==
- List of Japan Coast Guard vessels and aircraft
