= Shikishima Station =

Railway station in Shibukawa, Gunma Prefecture, Japan

Shikishima Station 敷島駅
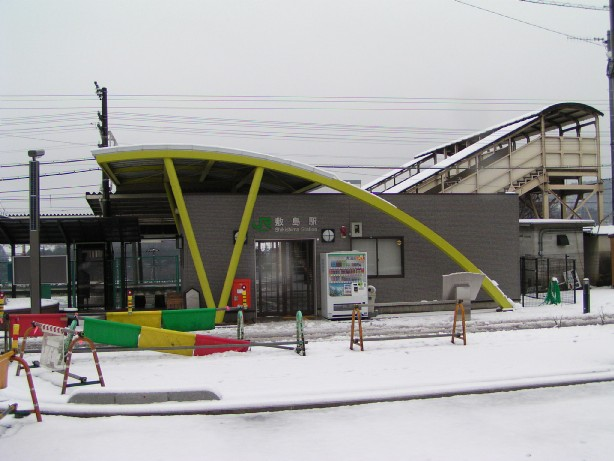
- Shikishima Station, January 2005

General information
- Location: Akagi-machi Shikishima 354-7, Shibukawa-shi, Gunma-ken 379-1104; Japan
- Coordinates: 36.5378°N 139.0340°E
- Operator: JR East
- Line: ■ Jōetsu Line
- Distance: 27.5 km from Takasaki
- Platforms: 1 side + 1 island platforms

Other information
- Status: Unstaffed
- Website: Official website

History
- Opened: 31 March 1924; 102 years ago

Passengers
- FY2013: 364 daily

Services
Preceding station	JR East	Following station
Shibukawa towards Takasaki	Jōetsu Line	Tsukuda towards Nagaoka
Location
- Location within Gunma Prefecture Location within Japan

Shikishima Station (敷島駅, Shikishima-eki) is a passenger railway station in the city of Shibukawa, Gunma, Japan, operated by the East Japan Railway Company (JR East).

== Lines ==
Shikishima Station is a station on the Jōetsu Line, and is located 27.5 kilometers from the starting point of the line at Takasaki.

== Station layout ==
The station has a single side platform and a single island platform connected to the station building by a footbridge; however, only one side of the island platform is in use. The station is unattended.

=== Platforms ===
1	■ Jōetsu Line	for Shibukawa and Takasaki
2	■ Jōetsu Line	for Minakami, Nagaoka

== History ==
Shikishima Station opened on 31 March 1924. Upon the privatization of the Japanese National Railways (JNR) on 1 April 1987, it came under the control of JR East. A new station building was completed in March 2003.

== Surrounding area ==
- Shikishima Onsen
- Akagi Post Office

== See also ==
- List of railway stations in Japan
