= Japanese patrol vessel Shikishima =

1991 Shikishima-class patrol vessel

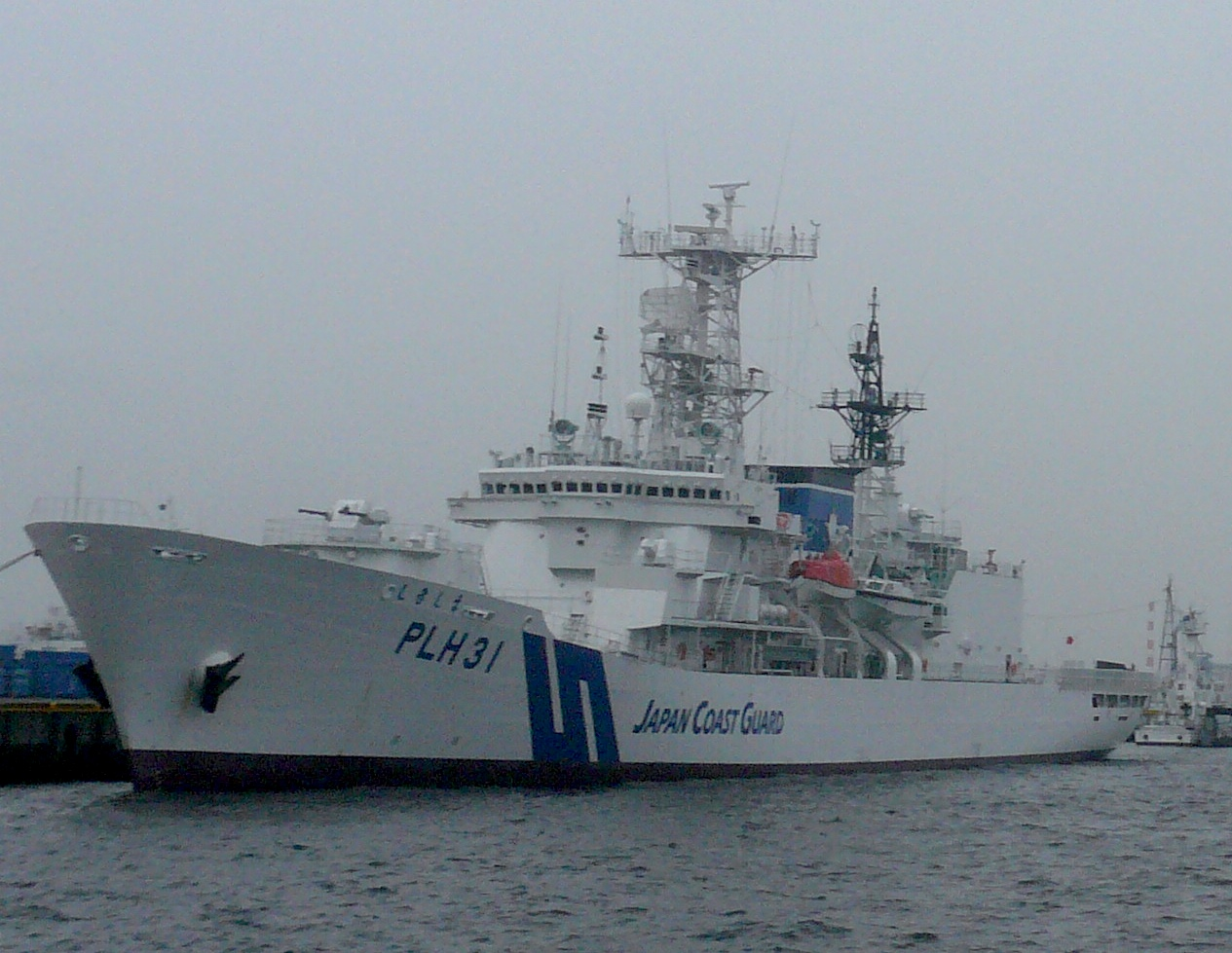
- Shikishima on July 7, 2007

History

Japan
- Name: Shikishima
- Builder: Ishikawajima-Harima Heavy Industries
- Laid down: August 24, 1990
- Launched: June 27, 1991
- Commissioned: April 8, 1992
- Decommissioned: April 15, 2024
- Identification: IMO number: 9009566; MMSI number: 431004000; Callsign: JPHH; Pennant number PLH-31

General characteristics
- Type: Large patrol vessel
- Displacement: 6,500 tonnes
- Length: 150.0 m (492 ft 2 in)
- Beam: 16.5 m (54 ft 2 in)
- Draft: 9.0 m (29 ft 6 in)
- Propulsion: 2 × shafts; 4 × diesel engines
- Speed: 25 knots (46 km/h; 29 mph)
- Range: 20,000 nmi (37,000 km; 23,000 mi)
- Sensors & processing systems: OPS-14 2D air search
- Armament: 2 × Oerlikon 35 mm twin cannon; 2 × JM61 20mm gun
- Aircraft carried: 2 × Eurocopter AS332

Shikishima was the lead ship of her class of long-range patrol ships built for the Japan Coast Guard (JCG). She was built by Ishikawajima-Harima Heavy Industries, Tokyo.

Planned to guard plutonium transport ships, the Shikishima class was the largest and heaviest-armed patrol vessel of the JCG. With her cruising capacity, she is capable of making voyages from Japan to Europe without making any calls.

== History ==
She was frequently sent on long cruises to Southeast Asia to foster international cooperation against piracy in the Strait of Malacca. She was also assigned to the policing mission of Senkaku Islands because of her cruising capacity. More ships of this design were constructed.

The Shikishima was decommissioned on April 15 2024, the ship's name and hull number was succeeded by a Reimei-class patrol vessel commissioned in March of 2025.

== Armaments ==
The Shikishima was the only JCG ship equipped with anti-air radar and Oerlikon 35 mm twin cannons, so she has increased anti-air firepower. Usually, PL (Patrol vessels, Large) have only a navigation radar and a single-mounted 35 mm or 40 mm autocannon. And the JM61 20 mm Vulcan on the single-mounted remote weapon system later became a model for the 20 mm RFS (Remote Firing System), which is on modern PMs and PSs such as the Tsurugi-class PS. The OPS-14 2D air search radar is the Japanese counterpart of the American AN/SPS-49.

== Bibliography ==
- Saunders, Stephen, ed. (2004). Jane's Fighting Ships 2004–2005. Coulsdon, UK: Jane's Information Group. ISBN 0-7106-2623-1.
