= Shibukawa Station =

Railway station in Shibukawa, Gunma Prefecture, Japan

Shibukawa Station 渋川駅
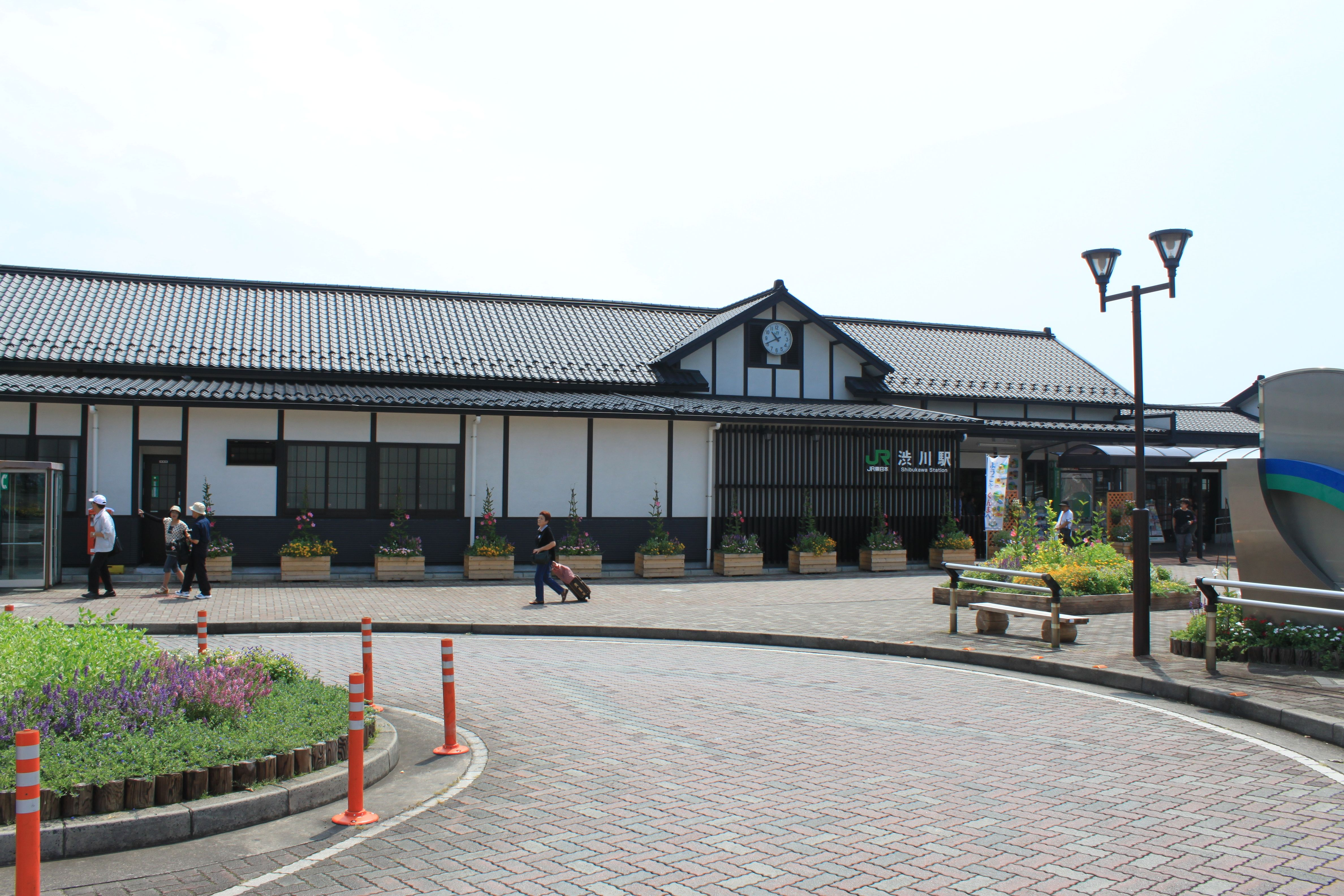
- Shibukawa Station in August 2011

General information
- Location: 1651-4 Shibukawa, Shibukawa-shi, Gunma-ken, Japan; Japan
- Coordinates: 36.4914°N 139.0091°E
- Operator: JR East; JR Freight
- Lines: ■ Joetsu Line; ■ Agatsuma Line
- Distance: 21.1 kilometres (13.1 mi) from Takasaki
- Platforms: 1 side + 1 island platform
- Tracks: 3

Other information
- Status: Staffed (Midori no Madoguchi )
- Website: Official website

History
- Opened: 1 July 1921; 105 years ago

Passengers
- FY2019: 3,263 daily

Services
Preceding station	JR East	Following station
Shin-Maebashi towards Ueno	Kusatsu	Nakanojō towards Naganohara-Kusatsuguchi
Yagihara towards Takasaki	Jōetsu Line	Shikishima towards Nagaoka
Yagihara towards Takasaki	Agatsuma Line	Kanashima towards Ōmae
Location
- Location within Japan

Shibukawa Station (渋川駅, Shibukawa-eki) is a junction railway station in the city of Shibukawa, Gunma, Japan, operated by the East Japan Railway Company (JR East).

== Lines ==
Shibukawa Station is a station on the Jōetsu Line and is 21.1 kilometers from the starting point of the line at Takasaki. It is also the official terminal station of the Agatsuma Line and 55.3 kilometers from the opposing terminus at Ōmae, although almost all trains continue past Shibukawa to terminate at Takasaki Station. It is also a freight depot for the Japan Freight Railway Company (JR Freight).

== Station layout ==
The station has a single side platform and a single island platform connected to the station building by an underground passage. The station has a Midori no Madoguchi ticket office.

From the bus terminal, local buses leave bound for Takasaki Station, Maebashi Station, Ikaho, Nakanojō Station, Numata direction, and other destinations. Long-distance buses leave for Tokyo, Osaka, and other destinations. A taxi stand is by the main entrance.

In the center of the sidewalk portion of the rotary is a large map of Japan; there is a sculpture in the center of the map, highlighting Shibukawa's claim to be the geographical center of Japan.

=== Platforms ===
1	■ Joetsu Line	for Minakami
1	■ Agatsuma Line	for Nakanojō and Naganohara-Kusatsuguchi
2-3	■ Joetsu Line	for Shin-Maebashi and Takasaki
2-3	■ Agatsuma Line	for Takasaki and Ueno

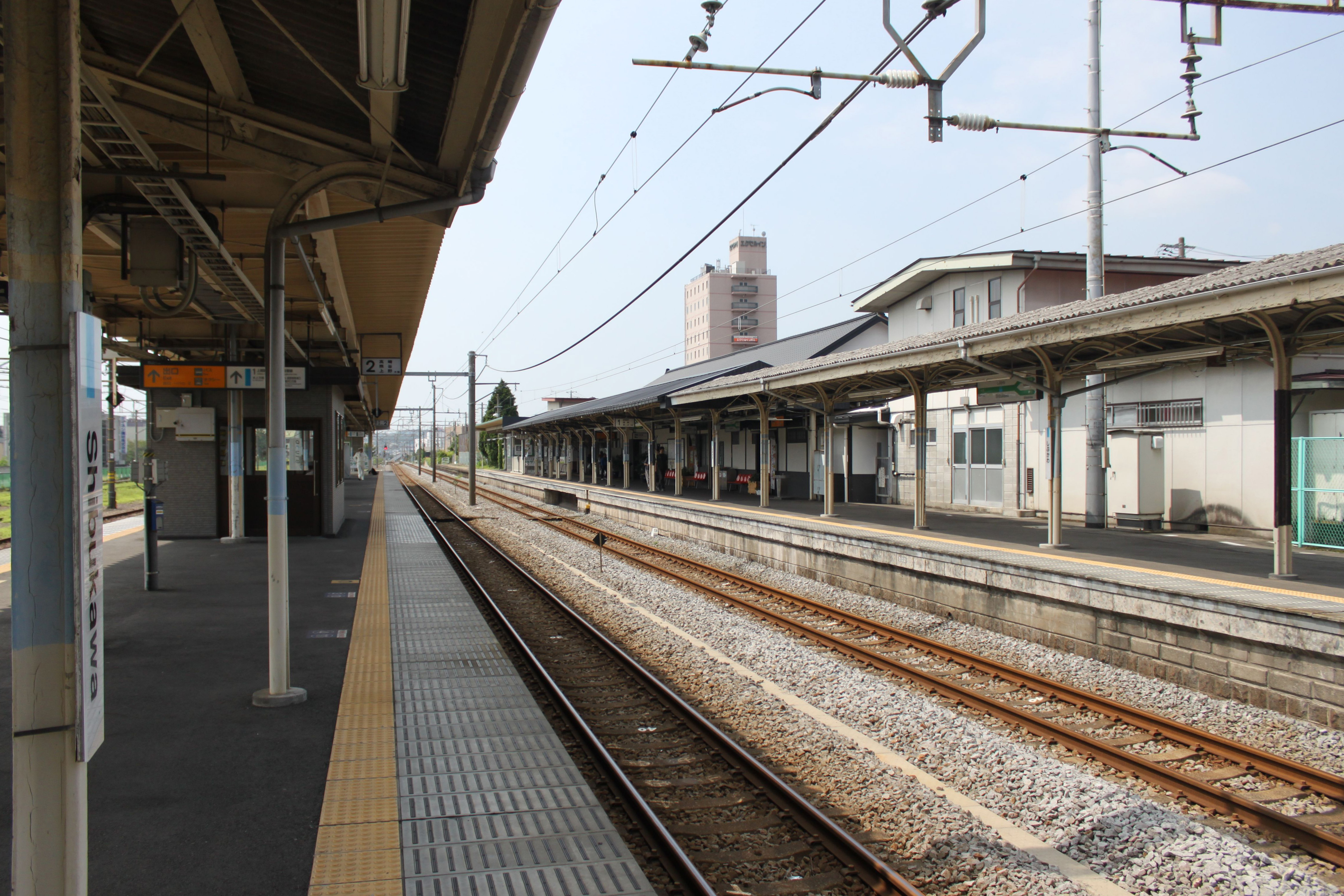
The platforms looking south in August 2011

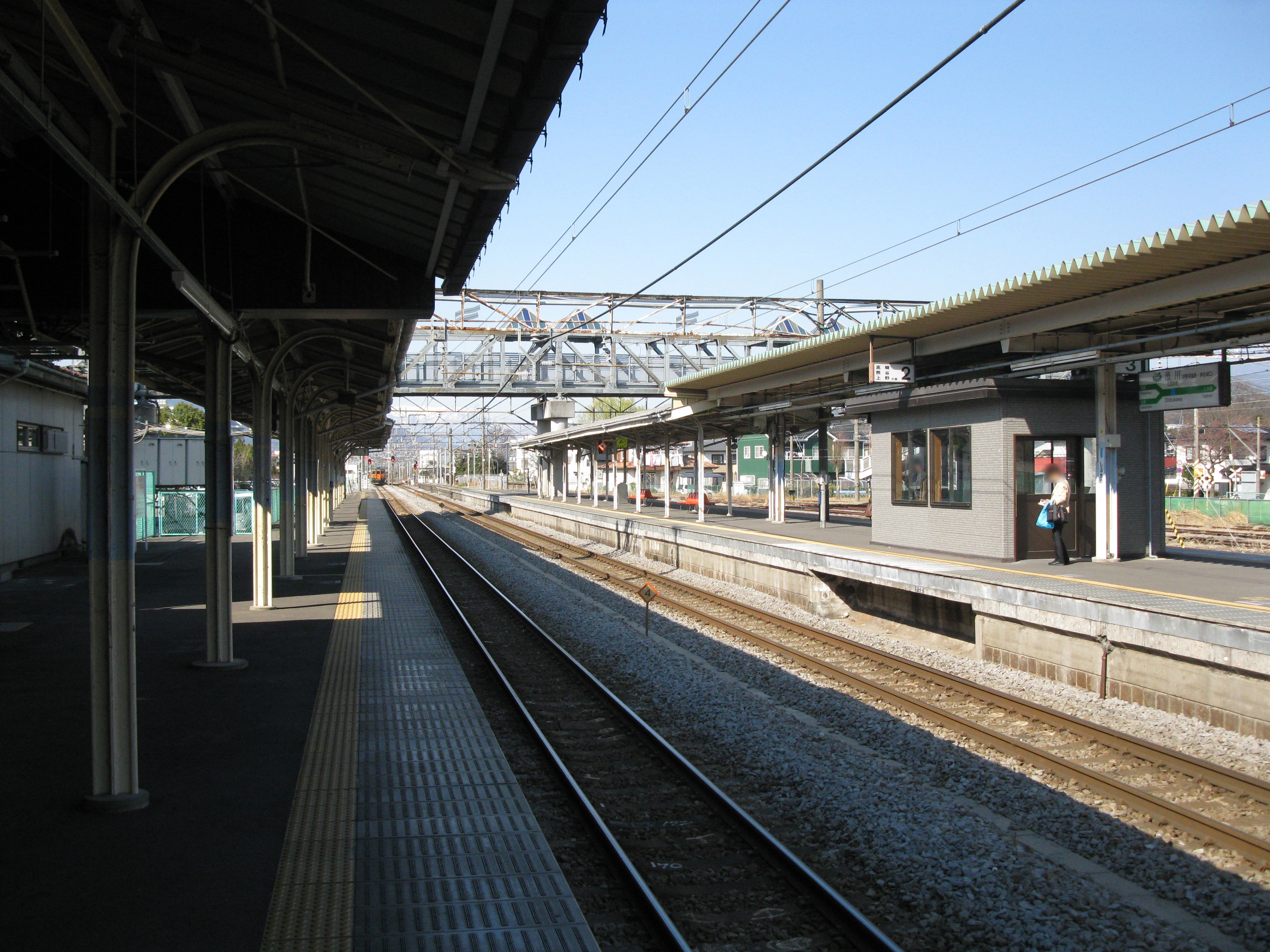
The platforms looking north in April 2011

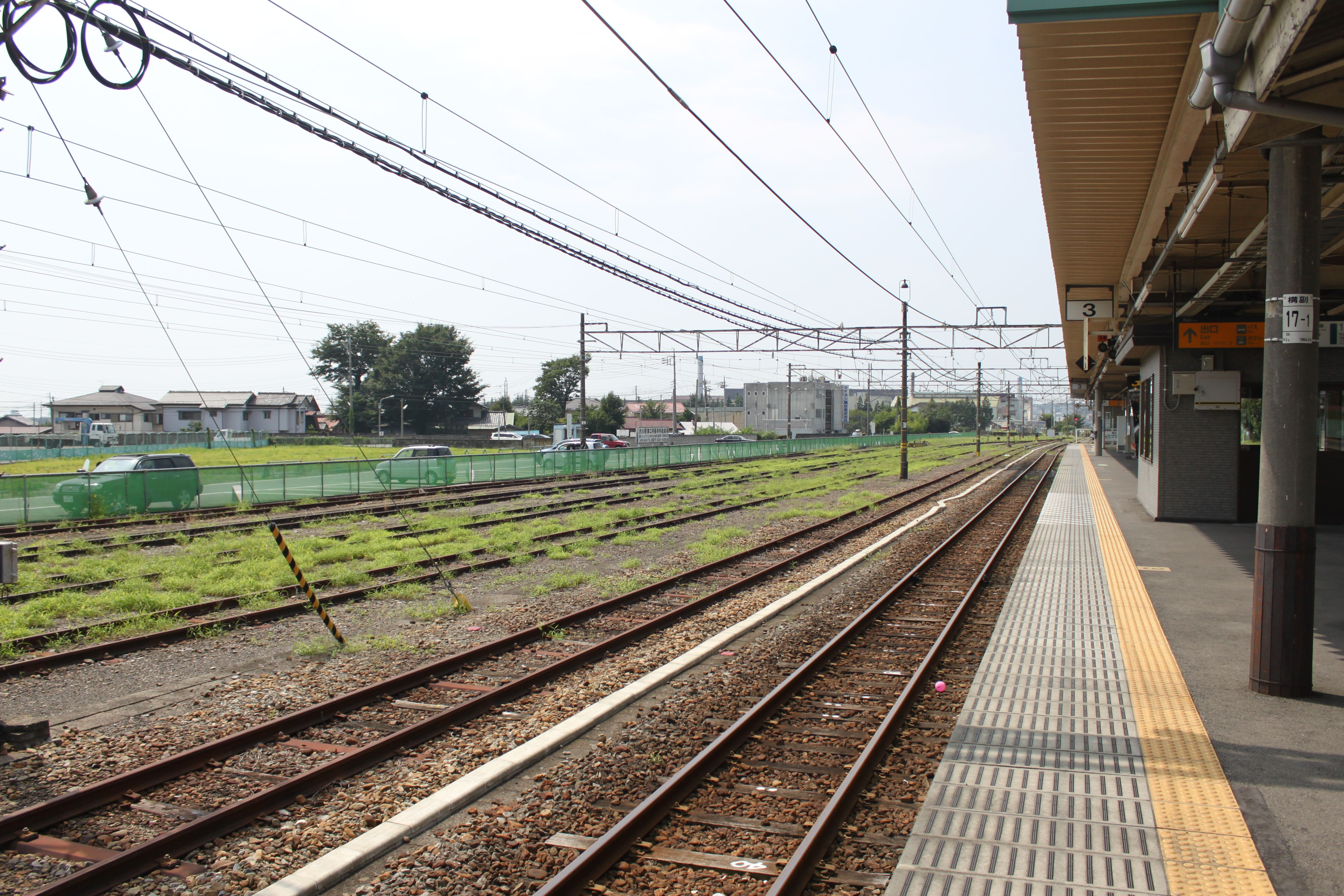
The view from platform 3 in August 2011, looking south

== History ==
Shibukawa Station opened on 1 July 1921. Upon the privatization of the Japanese National Railways (JNR) on 1 April 1987, it came under the control of JR East.

== Passenger statistics ==
In fiscal 2019, the station was used by an average of 3263 passengers daily (boarding passengers only). The passenger figures for previous years are as shown below.

Fiscal year	Daily average
2000	3,997
2005	3,563
2010	3,515
2015	3,441

== Surrounding area ==
- Shibukawa Shopping Plaza
- Shibukawa Post Office
- National Route 17

== See also ==
- List of railway stations in Japan
