= Osato =

Osato is a Japanese word and may refer to:

== People ==
- Momoko Osato (大里 桃子; born 1998), Japanese professional golfer
- Sono Osato (artist) (born 1960) American artist born in Baden Baden, Germany
- Sono Osato (1919–2018), American actress and dancer
- Mr Osato, a fictional businessman and SPECTRE agent in the 1967 James Bond film You Only Live Twice

== Place ==
- Ōsato District, Saitama a district located in eastern Saitama Prefecture
- Ōsato, Miyagi, a town in Miyagi Prefecture, Japan
- Osato, Saitama, a town in Saitama Prefecture, Japan
- Ōsato Station a railway station in the city of Inazawa, Aichi Prefecture
- Rikuchū-Ōsato Station, a JR East railway station located in the city of Kazuno, Akita Prefecture
