= Matsuhisa =

Matsuhisa may refer to

- Matsuhisa Station, a railway station in Misato, Saitama, Japan
- Miyuki Matsuhisa (松久 ミユキ, born 1945), Japanese Olympic gymnast
- Nobu Matsuhisa (松久 信幸, born 1949), Japanese celebrity chef and restaurateur
