= Tohto University =

Coordinates: 36°10′48.23″N 139°17′57.74″E

- 東都大学
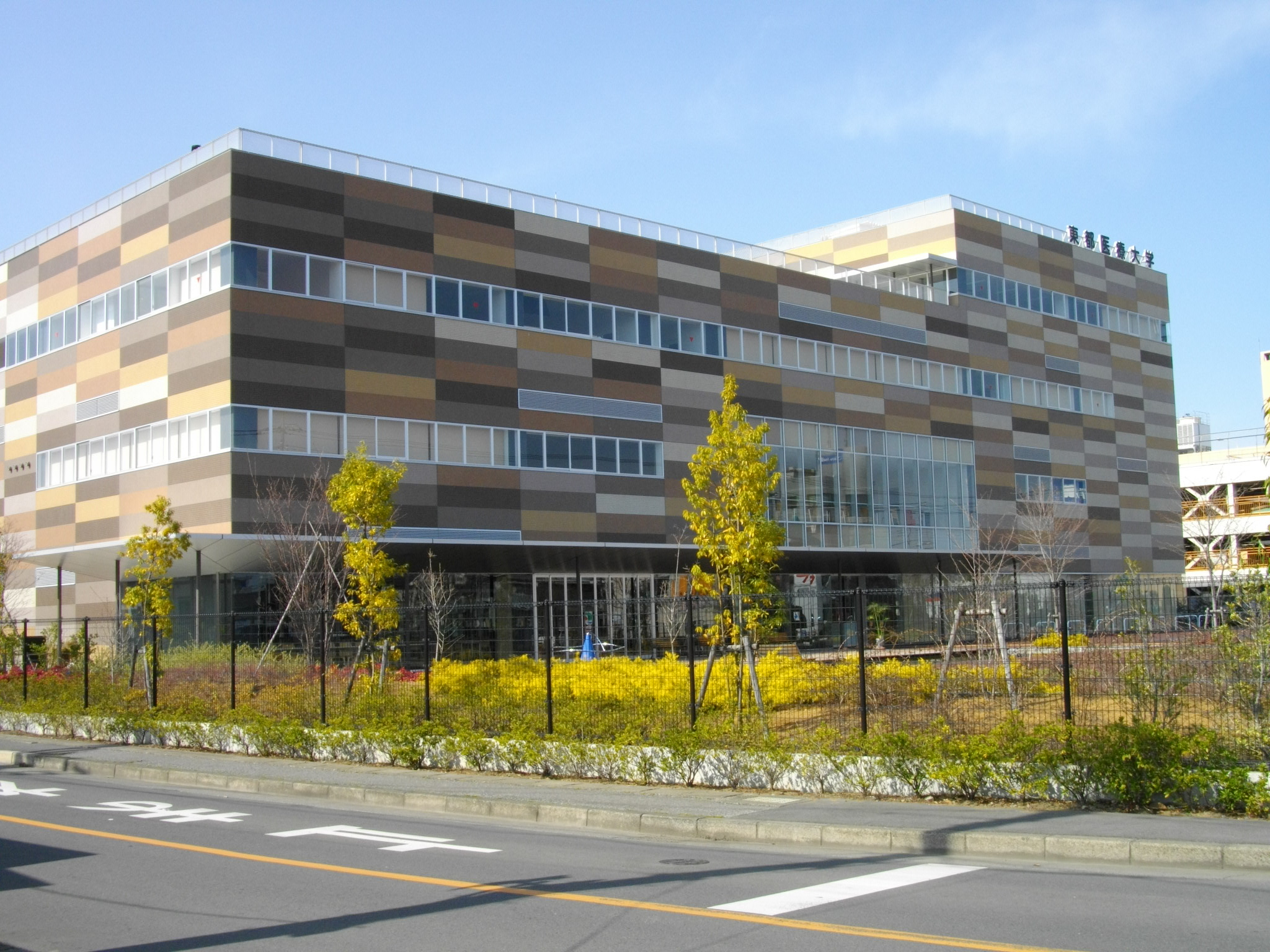
- Type: Private
- Established: 2009
- Undergraduates: 439
- Location: Fukaya, Saitama, Japan
- Website: www.tohto.ac.jp/index.html

Tohto University (東都大学, Tōto daigaku) is a private university in Fukaya, Saitama, Japan, renamed in 2019.

== History ==
Tohto College of Health Sciences (東都医療大学, Tōto Iryō daigaku) is established in 2009. It only offers degrees in nursing.
