= Misato, Saitama (town) =

Misato 美里町
- Town
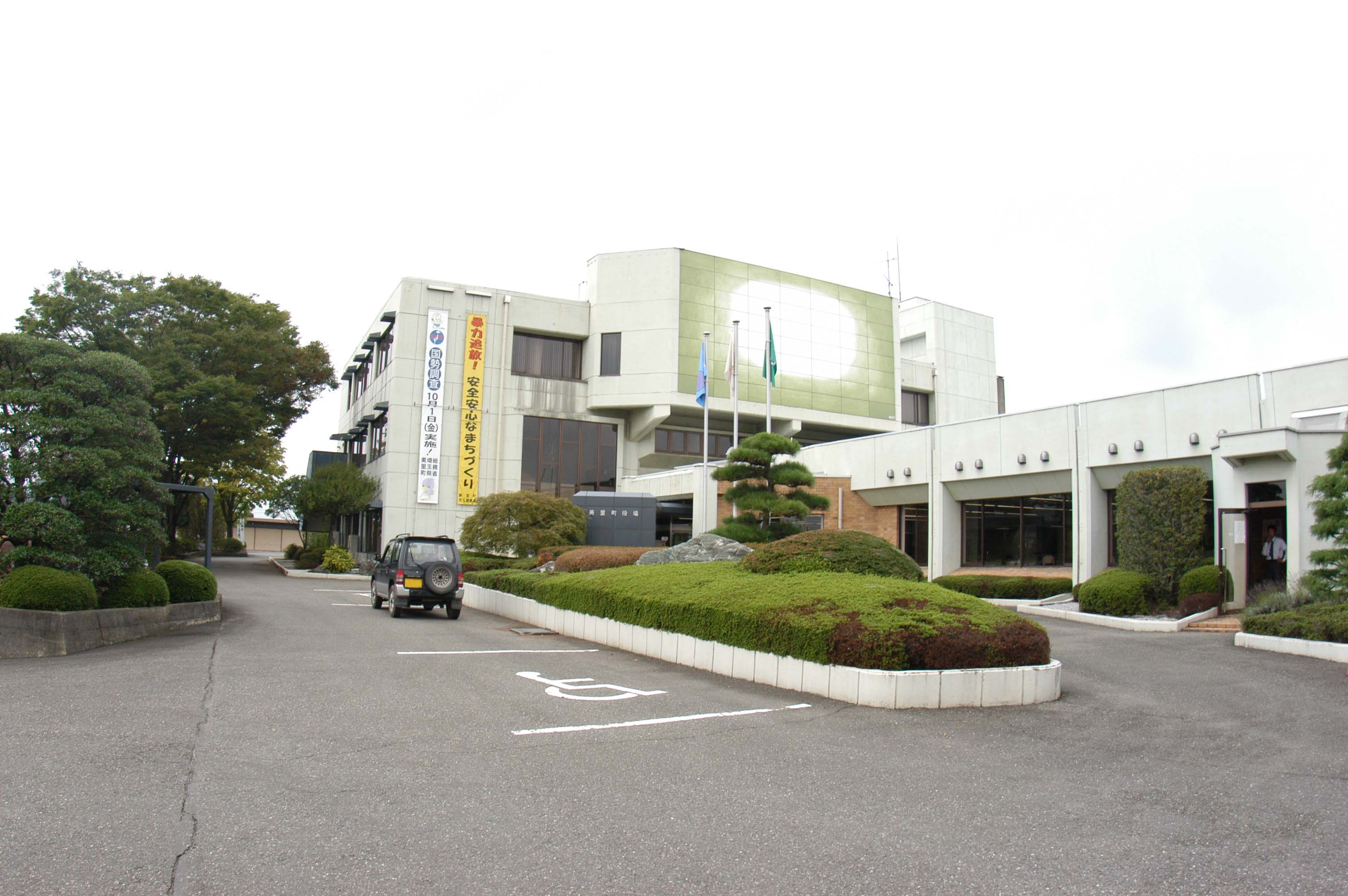
- Misato town office

- Flag Seal

- Location of Misato in Saitama Prefecture

- Coordinates: 36°10′37.8″N 139°10′53.2″E
- Country: Japan
- Region: Kantō
- Prefecture: Saitama
- District: Kodama

Area
  - Total: 33.41 km^{2} (12.90 sq mi)

Population (February 2021)
  - Total: 11,096
  - Density: 332.1/km^{2} (860.2/sq mi)
- Time zone: UTC+9 (Japan Standard Time)
- Tree: Japanese Red Pine
- Flower: Chrysanthemum
- Phone number: 0495-76-1111
- Address: 323-1 Kibe, Misato-cho, Kodama-gun, Saitama-ken 367-0194
- Website: Official website

Misato (美里町, Misato-machi) is a town located in Saitama Prefecture, Japan. As of 1 January 2021, the town had an estimated population of 11,097 in 4494 households and a population density of 330 persons per km^{2}. The total area of the town is 33.41 square kilometres (12.90 sq mi).

== Geography ==
Located in western Saitama Prefecture, Misato is on the central reaches of the Arakawa River and is approximately 70 kilometers from downtown Tokyo.

=== Surrounding municipalities ===
Saitama Prefecture

- Fukaya
- Honjō
- Yorii
- Nagatoro

=== Climate ===
Misato has a humid subtropical climate (Köppen Cfa) characterized by warm summers and cool winters with light to no snowfall. The average annual temperature in Misato is 13.1 °C. The average annual rainfall is 1532 mm with September as the wettest month. The temperatures are highest on average in August, at around 24.7 °C, and lowest in January, at around 1.7 °C.

== Demographics ==
Per Japanese census data, the population of Misato has remained relatively steady for a century.

Historical population
Year	Pop.	±%
1920	10,717	—
1930	11,114	+3.7%
1940	11,556	+4.0%
1950	13,638	+18.0%
1960	11,824	−13.3%
1970	10,493	−11.3%
1980	11,030	+5.1%
1990	11,797	+7.0%
2000	12,107	+2.6%
2010	11,605	−4.1%
2020	11,039	−4.9%

== History ==
Mastuhisa, Ozawa and Higashikodama villages were created within Naka District, Saitama with the establishment of the modern municipalities system on April 1, 1889. Naka District was abolished in 1896, becoming part of Kodama District. The three villages merged to form the village of Misato on October 1, 1954. Misato was elevated to town status on October 1, 1984.

== Government ==
Misato has a mayor-council form of government with a directly elected mayor and a unicameral town council of 13 members. Misato, together with the city of Fukaya and the town of Yorii, contributes three members to the Saitama Prefectural Assembly. In terms of national politics, the town is part of Saitama 11th district of the lower house of the Diet of Japan.

== Economy ==
- Eisai has a pharmaceutical plant in Misato, which is a major local employer.

== Education ==
Misato has three public elementary schools and one public middle school operated by the town government. The town does not have a high school.

== Transportation ==
=== Railway ===
JR East – Hachikō Line

- Matsuhisa

=== Highway ===
- National Route 254
