= Hanazono, Saitama =

Town located in Ōsato District, Saitama Prefecture, Japan

Hanazono (花園町, Hanazono-machi) was a town located in Ōsato District, Saitama Prefecture, Japan.

As of 2004, the town had an estimated population of 12,740 and a density of 805.31 persons per km^{2}. The total area was 15.82 km^{2}.

On January 1, 2006, Hanazono, along with the towns of Kawamoto and Okabe (all from Ōsato District), was merged into the expanded city of Fukaya.
