= Tamayodo Station =

Railway station in Yorii, Saitama Prefecture, Japan

TJ38 Tamayodo Station 玉淀駅
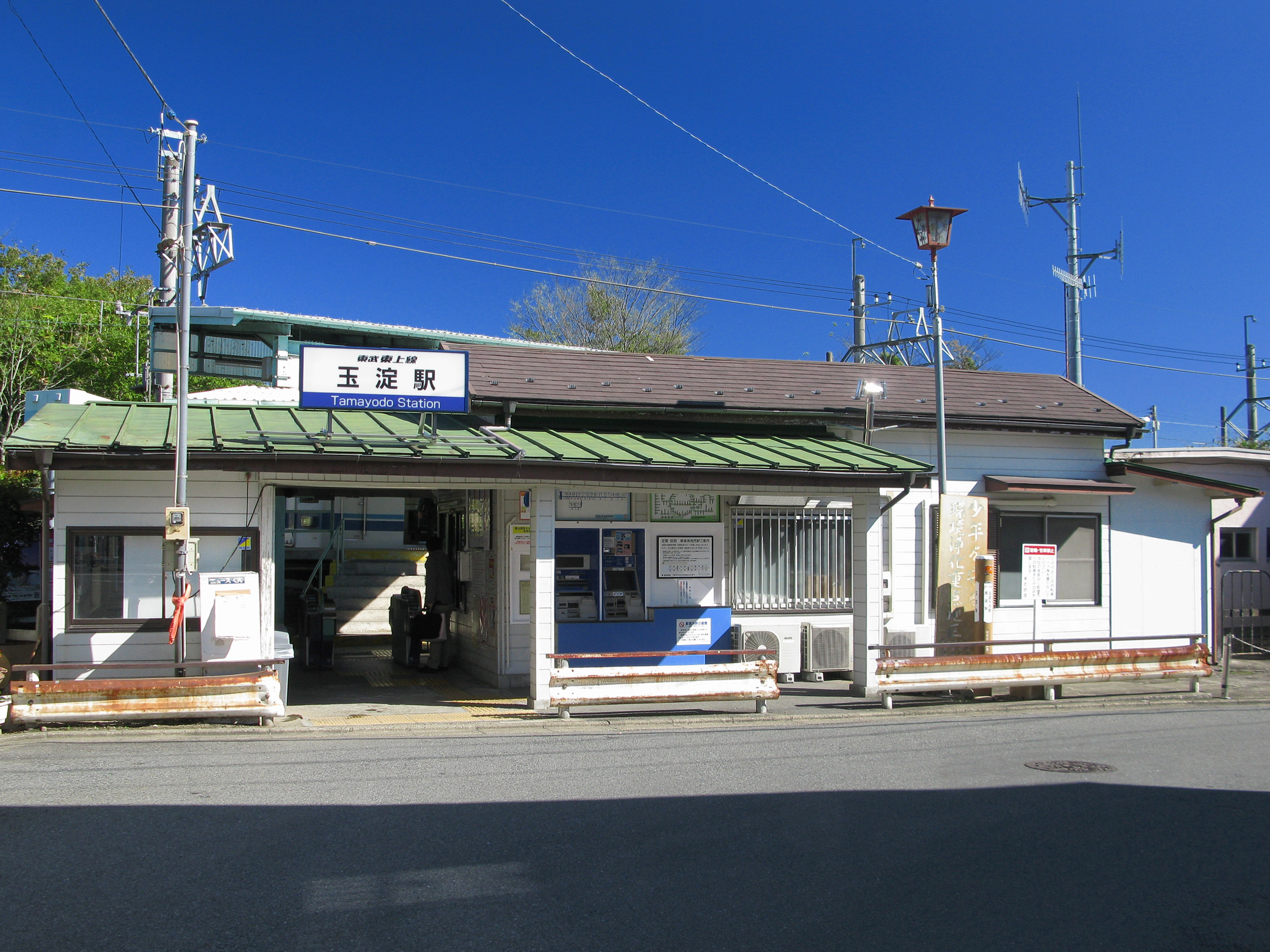
- Tamayodo Station in November 2012

General information
- Location: 824-1 Yorii, Yorii-machi, Ōsato-gun, Saitama-ken 369-1203; Japan
- Coordinates: 36.1170°N 139.2001°E
- Operator: Tōbu Railway
- Line: Tōbu Tōjō Line
- Distance: 74.4 km from Ikebukuro
- Platforms: 1 side platform
- Tracks: 1

Other information
- Station code: TJ-38
- Website: www.tobu.co.jp/station/info/7508.html

History
- Opened: 1 April 1934

Passengers
- FY2019: 591 daily

Services
| Preceding station | Tobu Railway | Following station |
|---|---|---|
| Yorii TJ39 Terminus | Tojo Line | Hachigata TJ37 towards Ogawamachi |
Location
- Location within Saitama Prefecture Location within Japan

Tamayodo Station (玉淀駅, Tamayodo-eki) is a passenger railway station in the town of Yorii, Saitama, Japan, operated by the private railway operator Tōbu Railway.

== Lines ==
Tamayodo Station is served by the Tōbu Tōjō Line from Ikebukuro in Tokyo, and is located 74.4 km from the Ikebukuro terminus. During the daytime, the station is served by two "Local" (all-stations) trains per hour in each direction between Ogawamachi and Yorii. There are no direct trains to or from Ikebukuro.

== Station layout ==
The station consists of one side platform serving a single bidirectional track.

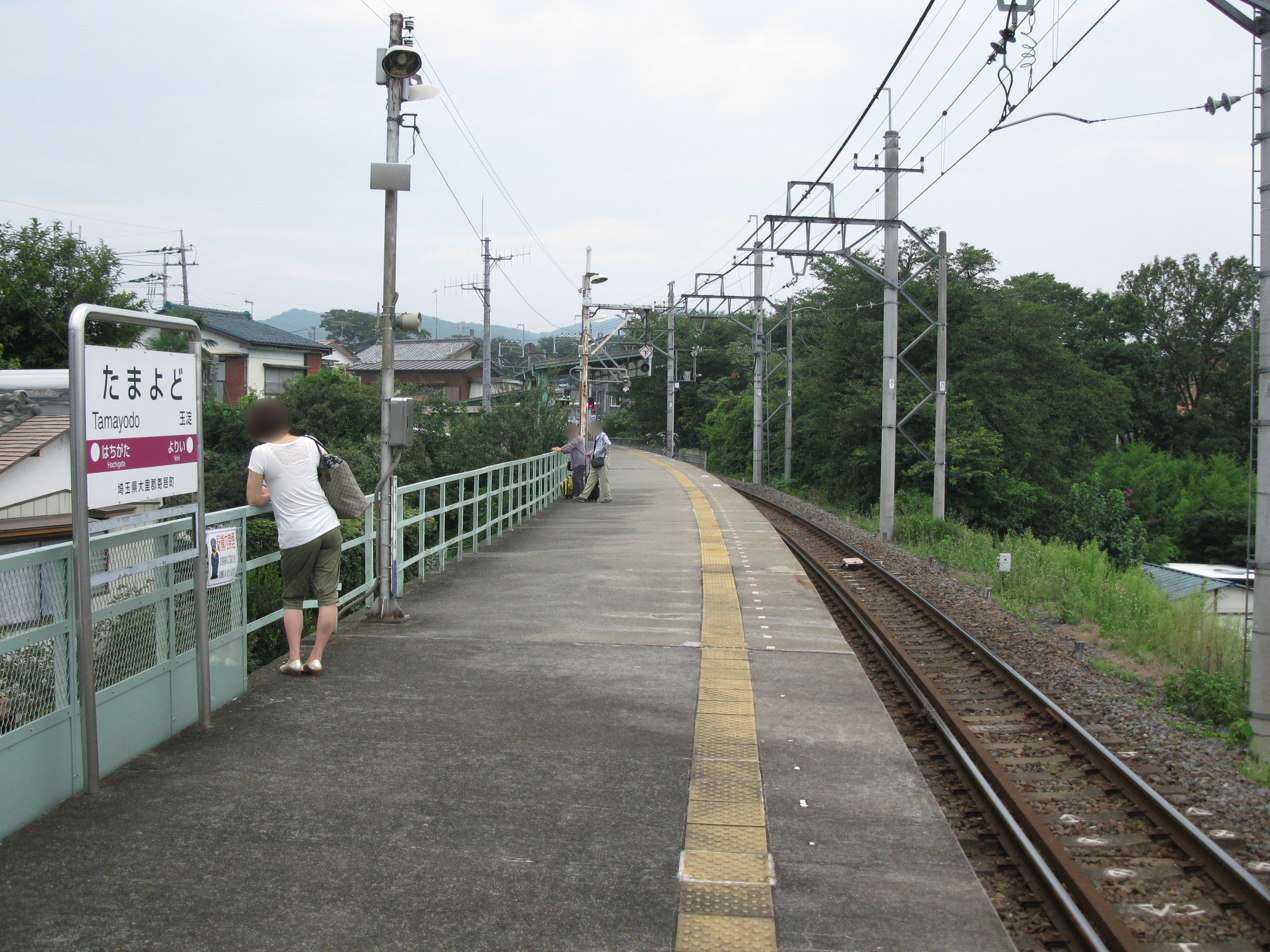
Tamayodo Station platform in August 2009

== History ==
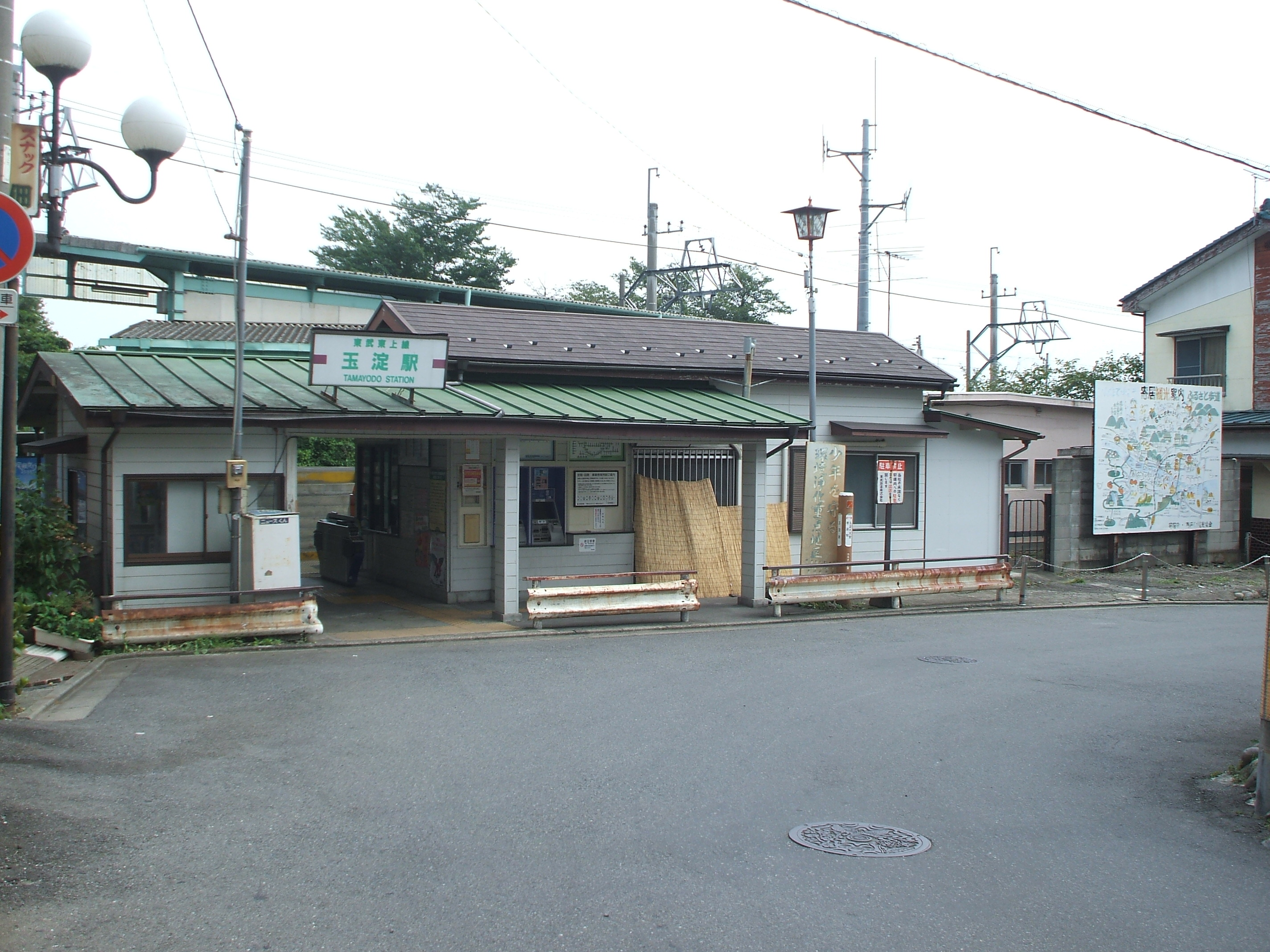
The station in August 2009

The station opened on 1 April 1934.

From 17 March 2012, station numbering was introduced on the Tōbu Tōjō Line, with Tamayodo Station becoming "TJ-37".

== Passenger statistics ==
In fiscal 2019, the station was used by an average of 591 passengers daily.

== Surrounding area ==
- Arakawa River

== See also ==
- List of railway stations in Japan
