= Obusuma Station =

Railway station in Yorii, Saitama Prefecture, Japan

TJ36 Obusuma Station 男衾駅
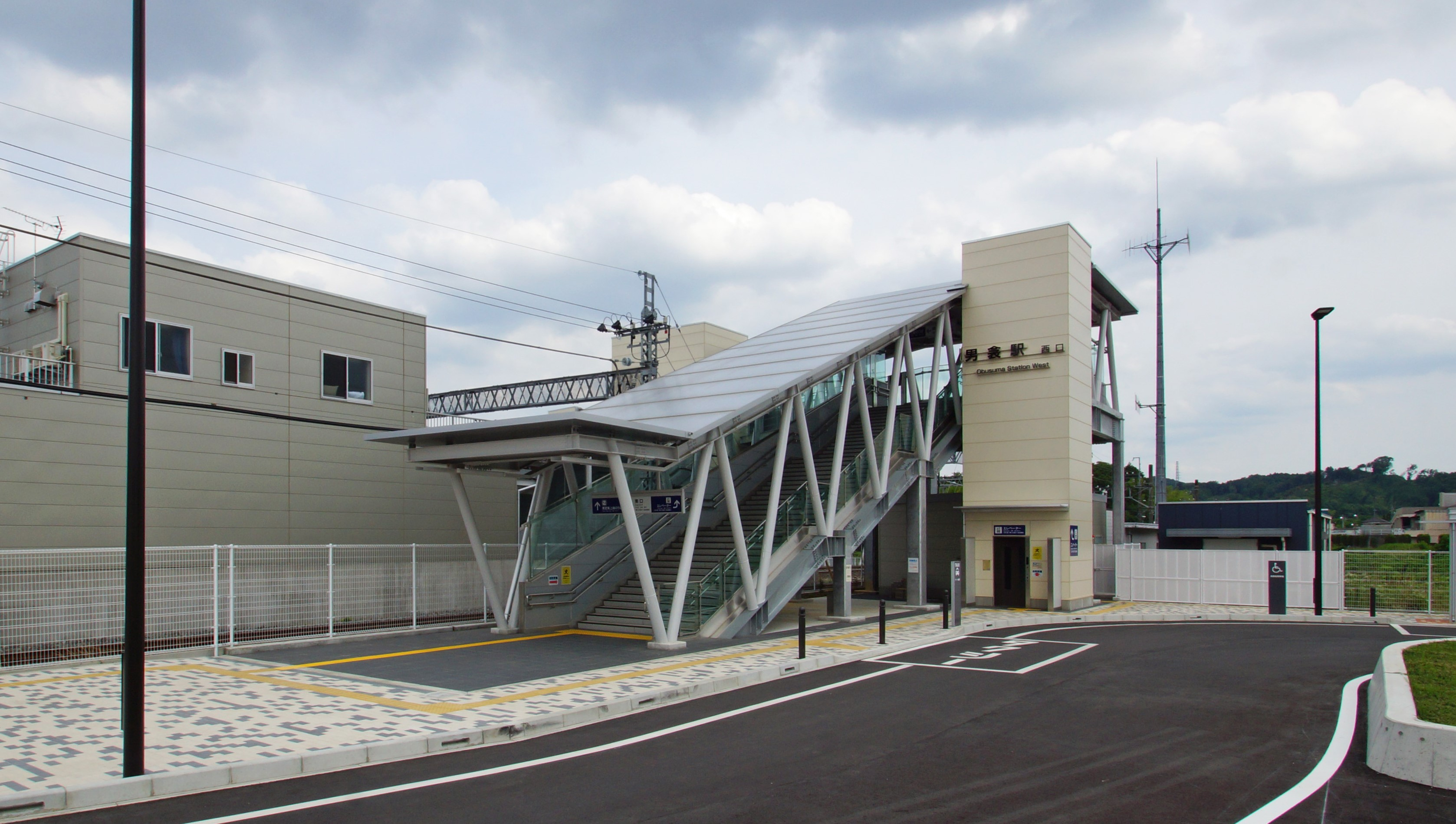
- The west side of the station in June 2017

General information
- Location: 1792-1 Tomida, Yorii-machi, Ōsato-gun, Saitama-ken 369-1216; Japan
- Coordinates: 36.1072°N 139.2346°E
- Operator: Tōbu Railway
- Line: Tobu Tojo Line
- Distance: 70.8 km from Ikebukuro
- Platforms: 1 island platform
- Tracks: 2

Construction
- Parking: No
- Cycle facilities: Yes
- Accessible: Passenger lifts

Other information
- Station code: TJ-36
- Website: Official website

History
- Opened: 10 July 1925
- Rebuilt: 2014-2016

Passengers
- FY2019: 1,685 daily

Services
Preceding station	Tobu Railway	Following station
Hachigata TJ37 towards Yorii	Tojo Line	Minami-yorii TJ35 towards Ogawamachi
Location
- Location within Saitama Prefecture Location within Japan

Obusuma Station (男衾駅, Obusuma-eki) is a passenger railway station in the town of Yorii, Saitama, Japan, operated by the private railway operator Tōbu Railway.

== Lines ==
Obusuma Station is served by the Tōbu Tōjō Line from Ikebukuro in Tokyo, and is located 70.8 km from the Ikebukuro terminus. During the daytime, the station is served by two "Local" (all-stations) trains per hour in each direction between Ogawamachi and Yorii. There are no direct trains to or from Ikebukuro.

== Station layout ==
The station consists of an island platform serving two tracks. Entrances to the station are provided on both the east and west sides, with the ticket barriers located at the south (up) end of the platform.

A storage loop used for track maintenance equipment lies to the east of the station on the site of what was formerly a freight yard.

=== Platforms ===
1	■ Tōbu Tōjō Line	for Yorii
2	■ Tōbu Tōjō Line	for Ogawamachi, Kawagoe, Wakōshi, and Ikebukuro

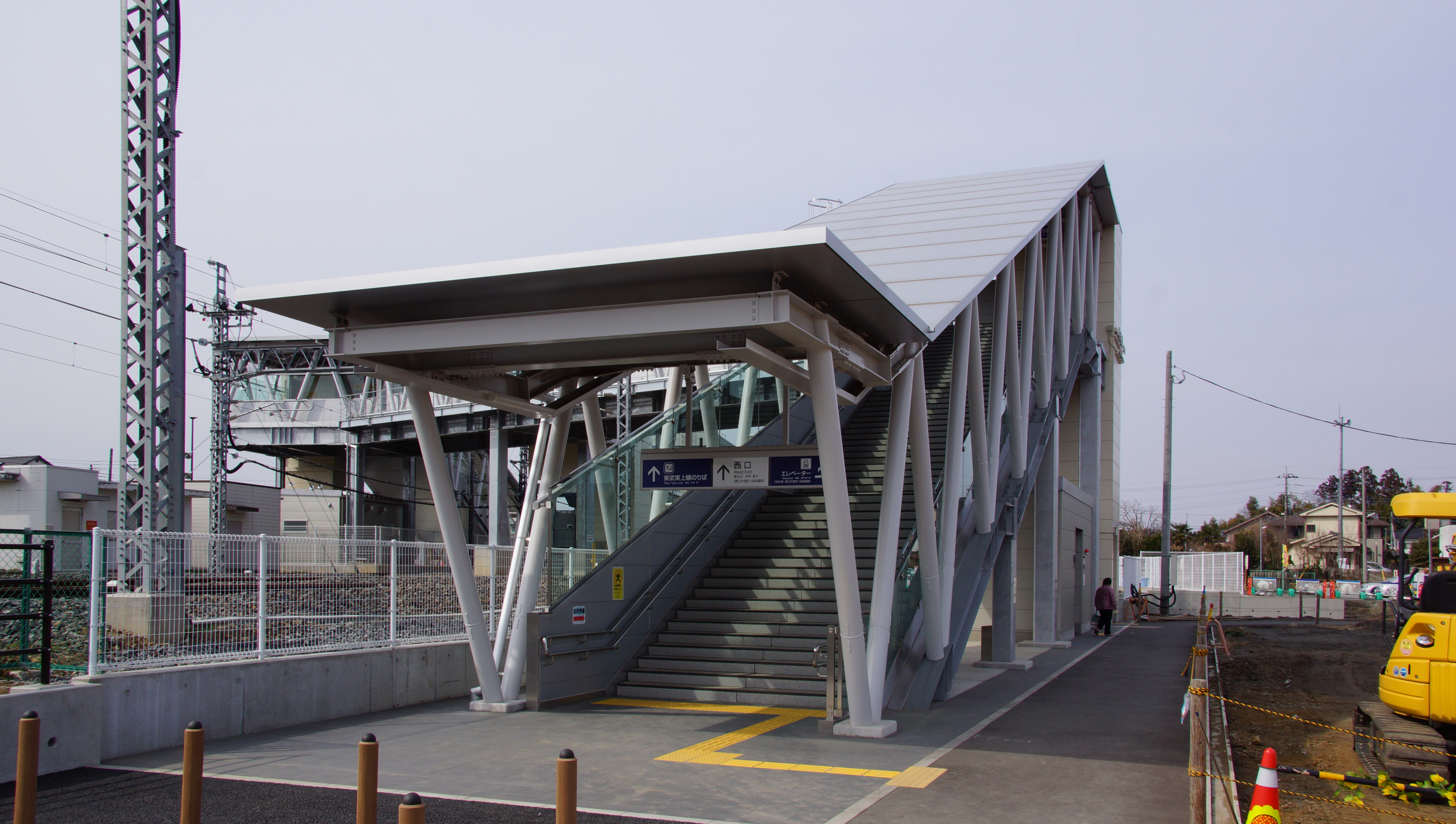
The east entrance in March 2017

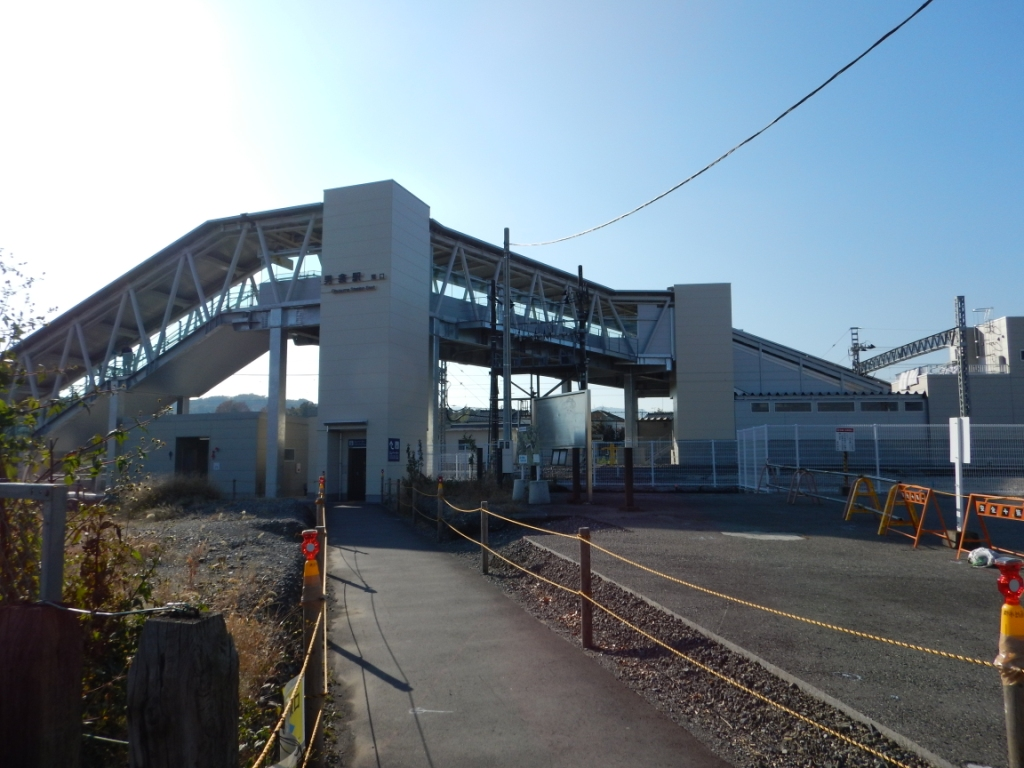
The east side passenger lift in November 2016

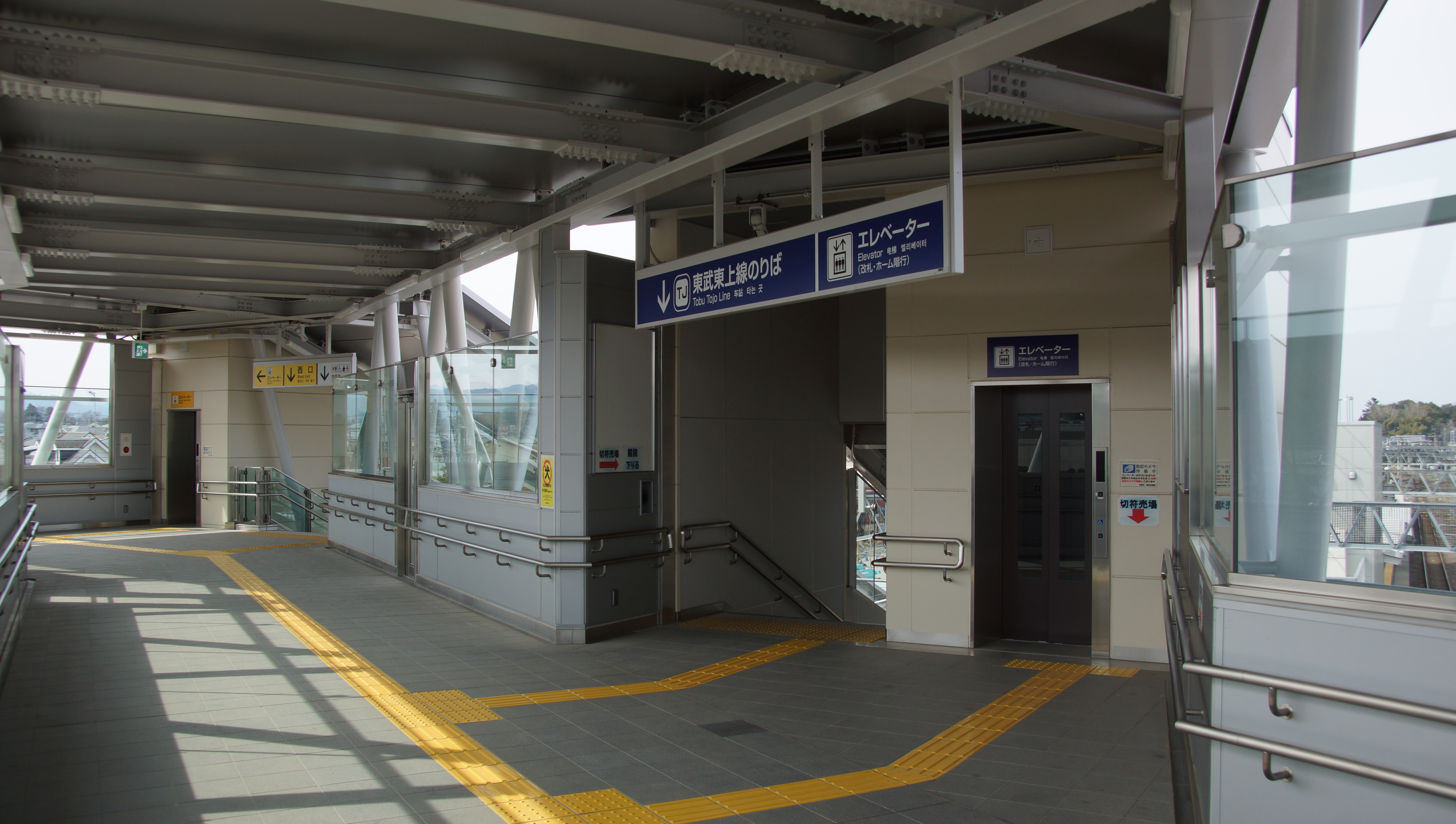
Access to the platform from the pedestrian bridge in March 2017

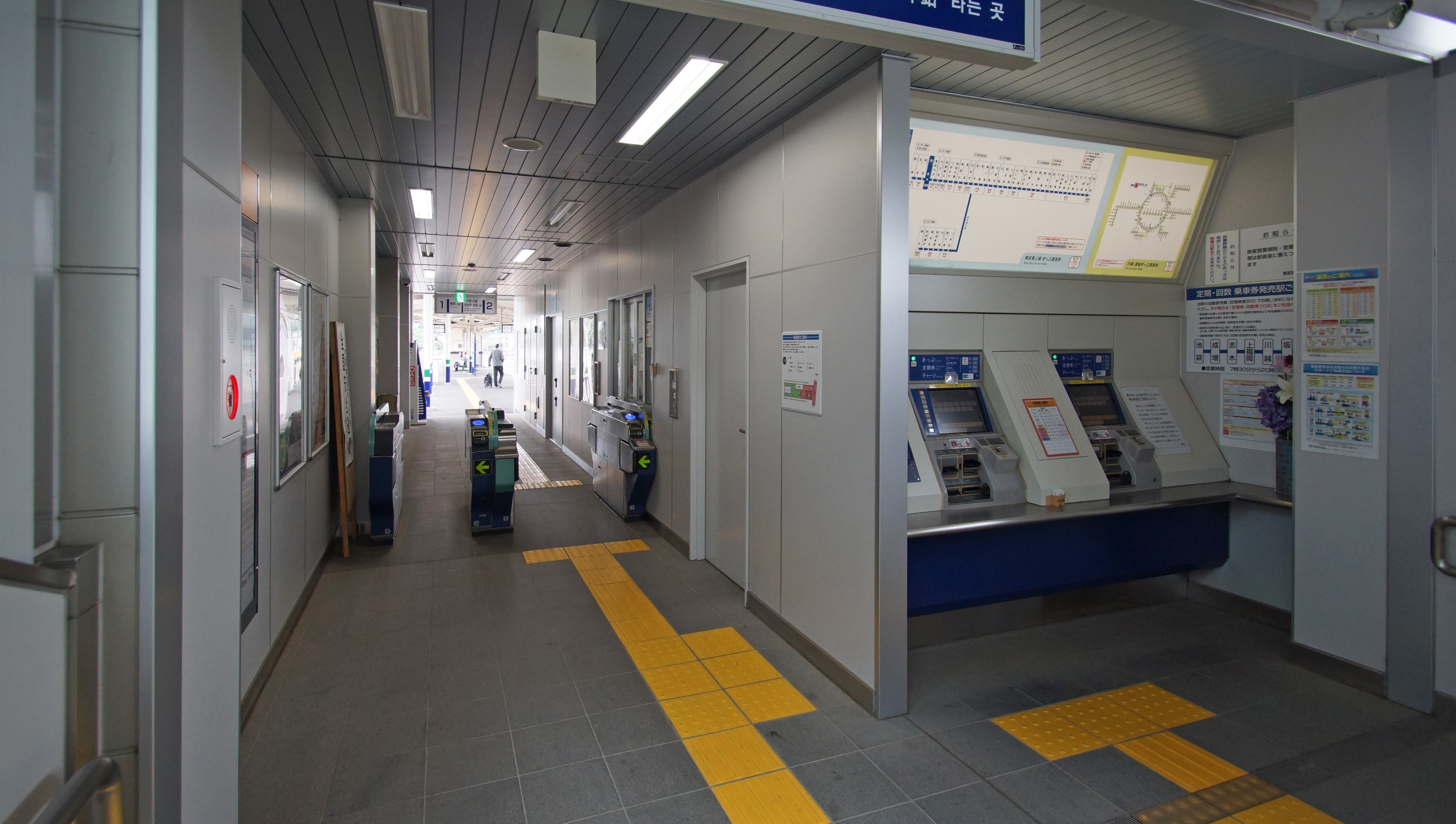
The ticket barriers to the platform in June 2017

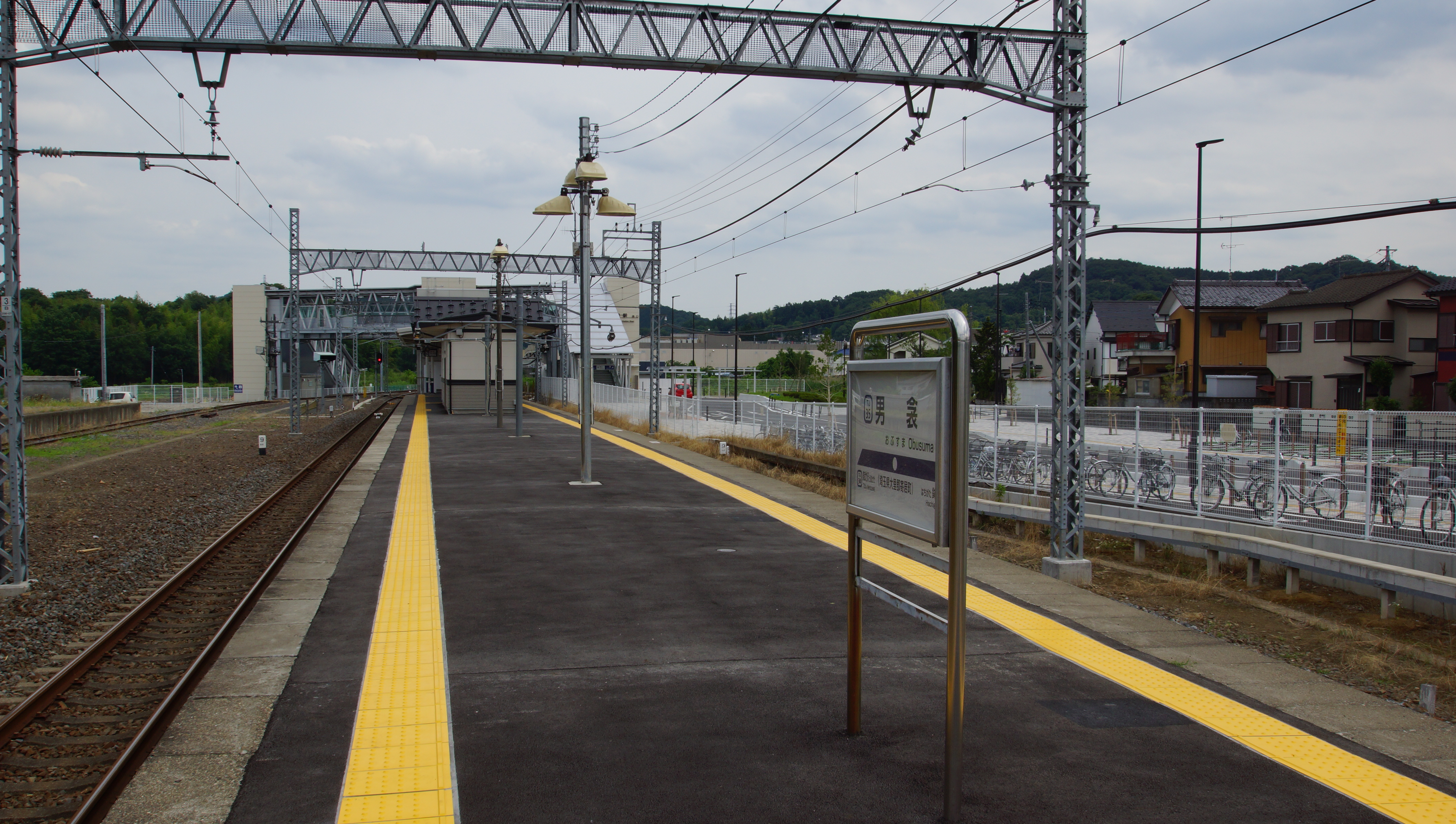
The platform looking south in June 2017

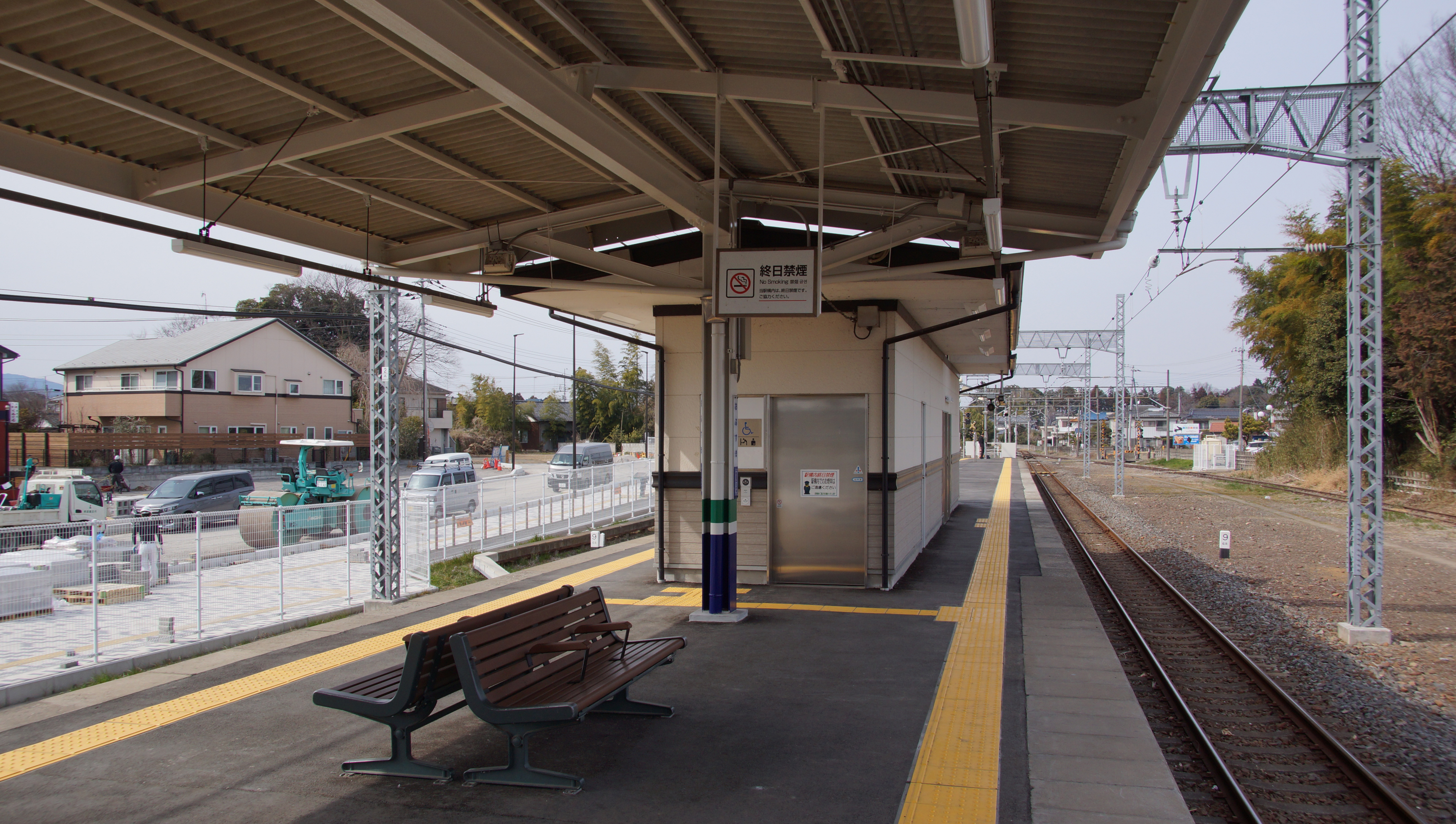
The toilet block on the platform in March 2017

== History ==
The station opened on July 10, 1925.

From 17 March 2012, station numbering was introduced on the Tōbu Tōjō Line, with Obusuma Station becoming "TJ-35".

The station building was formerly located on the east (up) side of the tracks, connected to the platforms by an overhead footbridge, with no access to the station from the west side. Prior to rebuilding, the remains of a former side platform also lay on the west side of the station.

Work to rebuild the station commenced in June 2014, and was completed in July 2016, with entrances on both east and west sides of the station and a new footbridge.

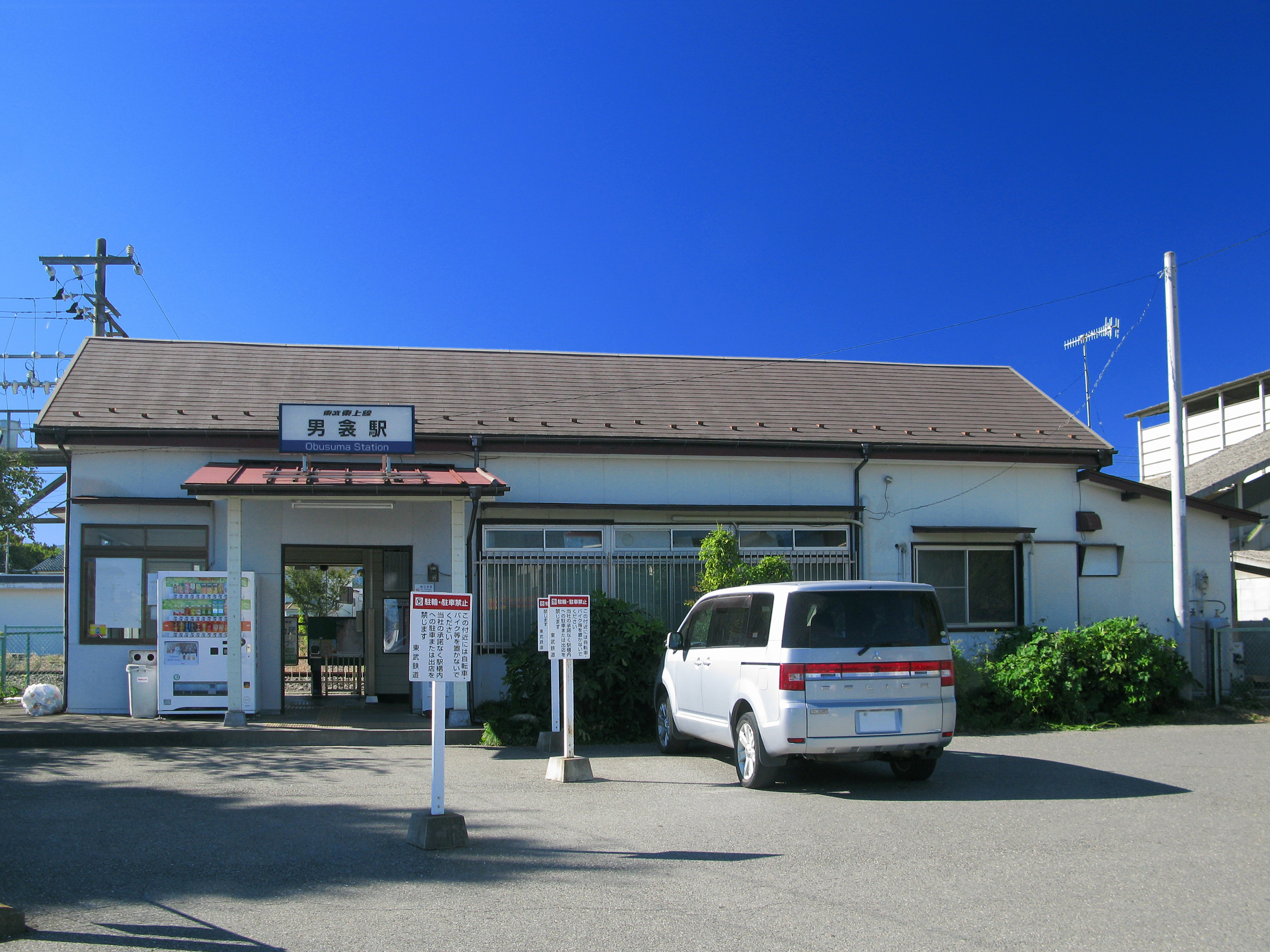
The former station building in November 2012

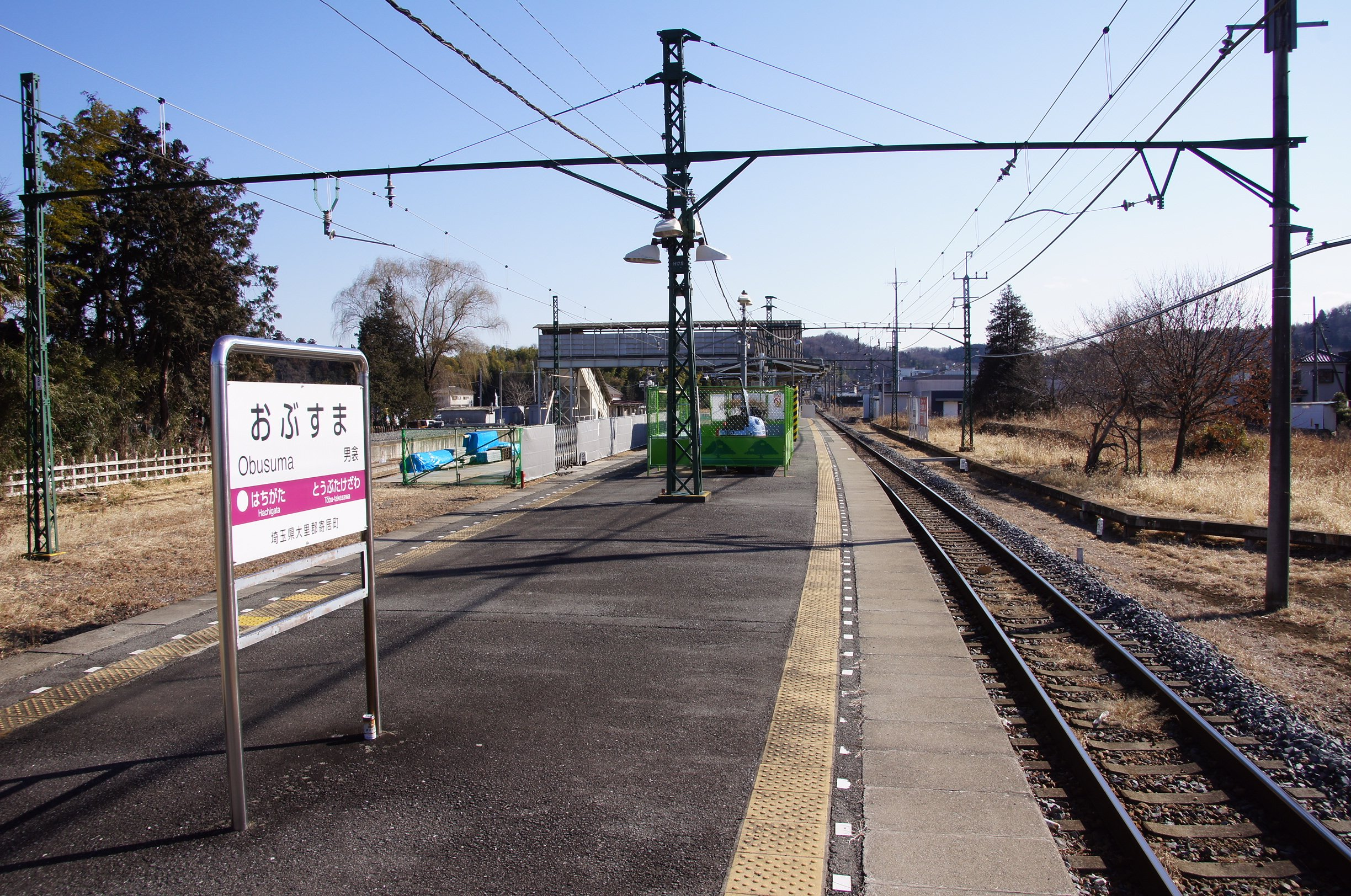
View of the platforms looking south in February 2012

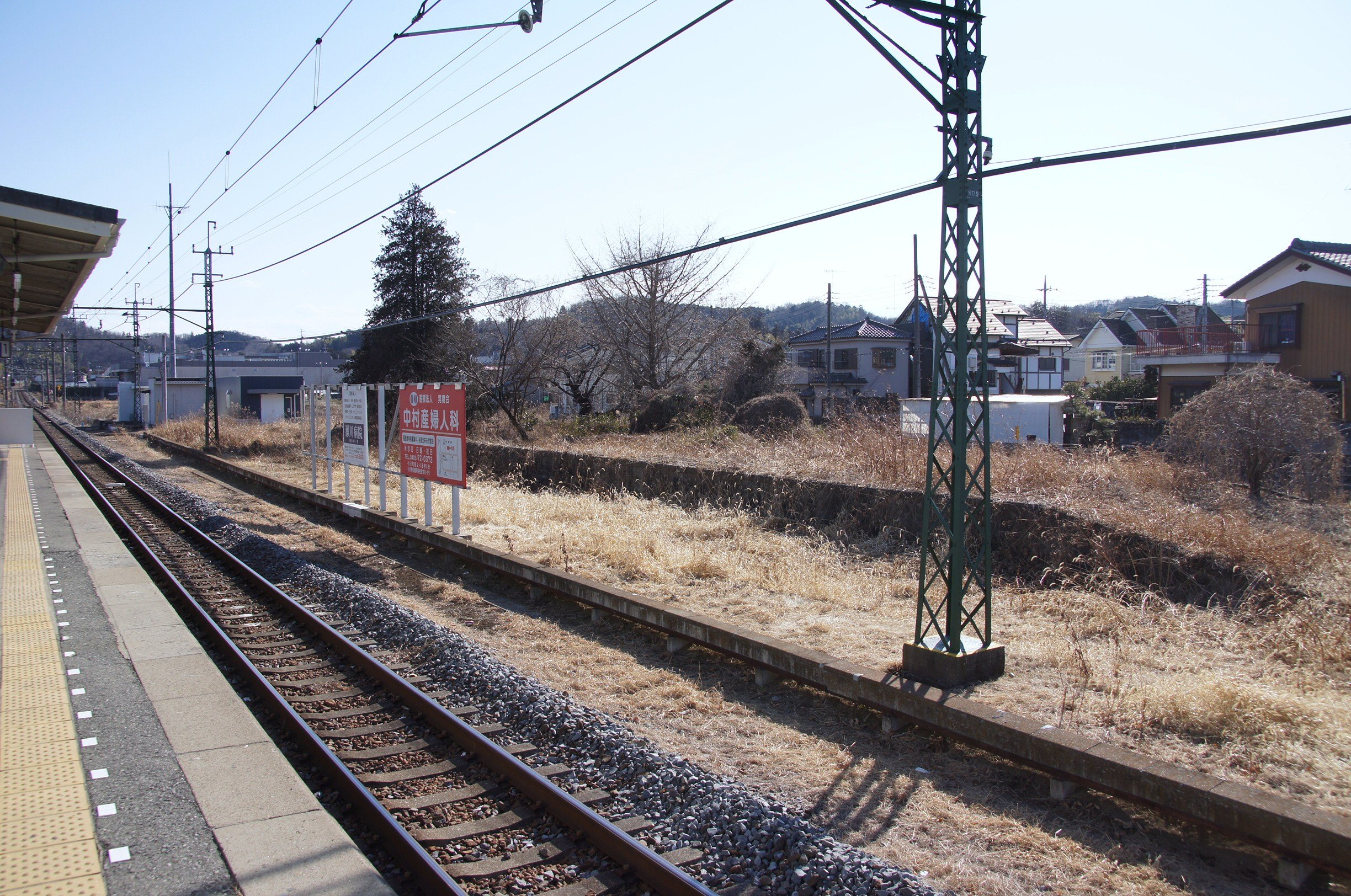
View of the disused freight platform next to platform 1 in February 2012

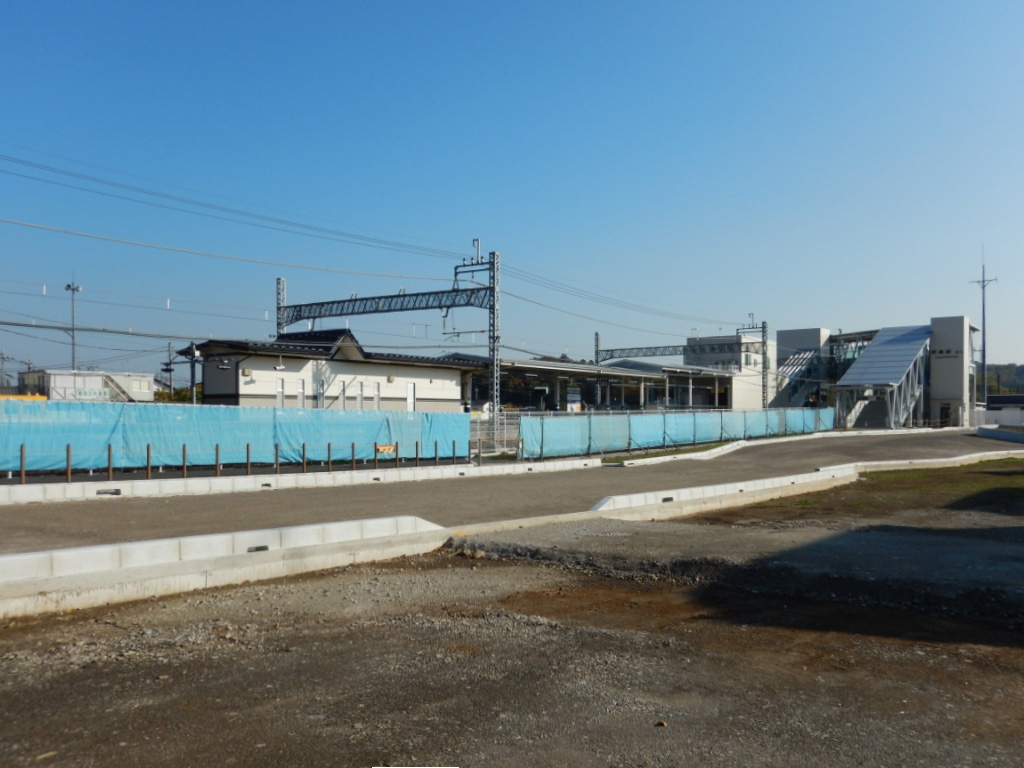
The west side of the station in November 2016, with the station approach still under construction

== Passenger statistics ==
In fiscal 2019, the station was used by an average of 1685 passengers daily.

== Surrounding area ==
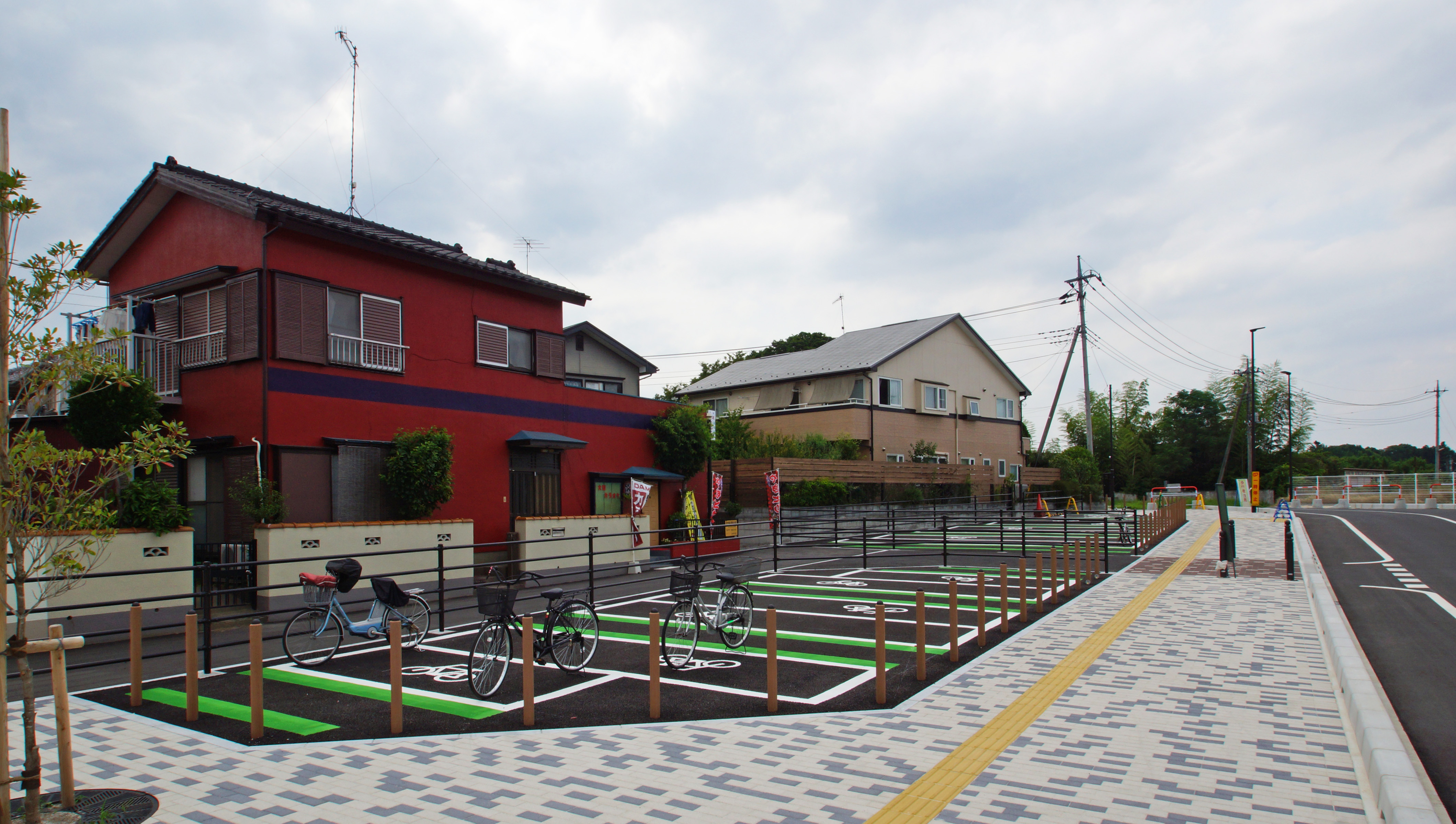
The bicycle parking area on the west side of the station in June 2017

- National Route 254

== See also ==
- List of railway stations in Japan
