= Hachigata Station =

Railway station in Yorii, Saitama Prefecture, Japan

TJ37 Hachigata Station 鉢形駅
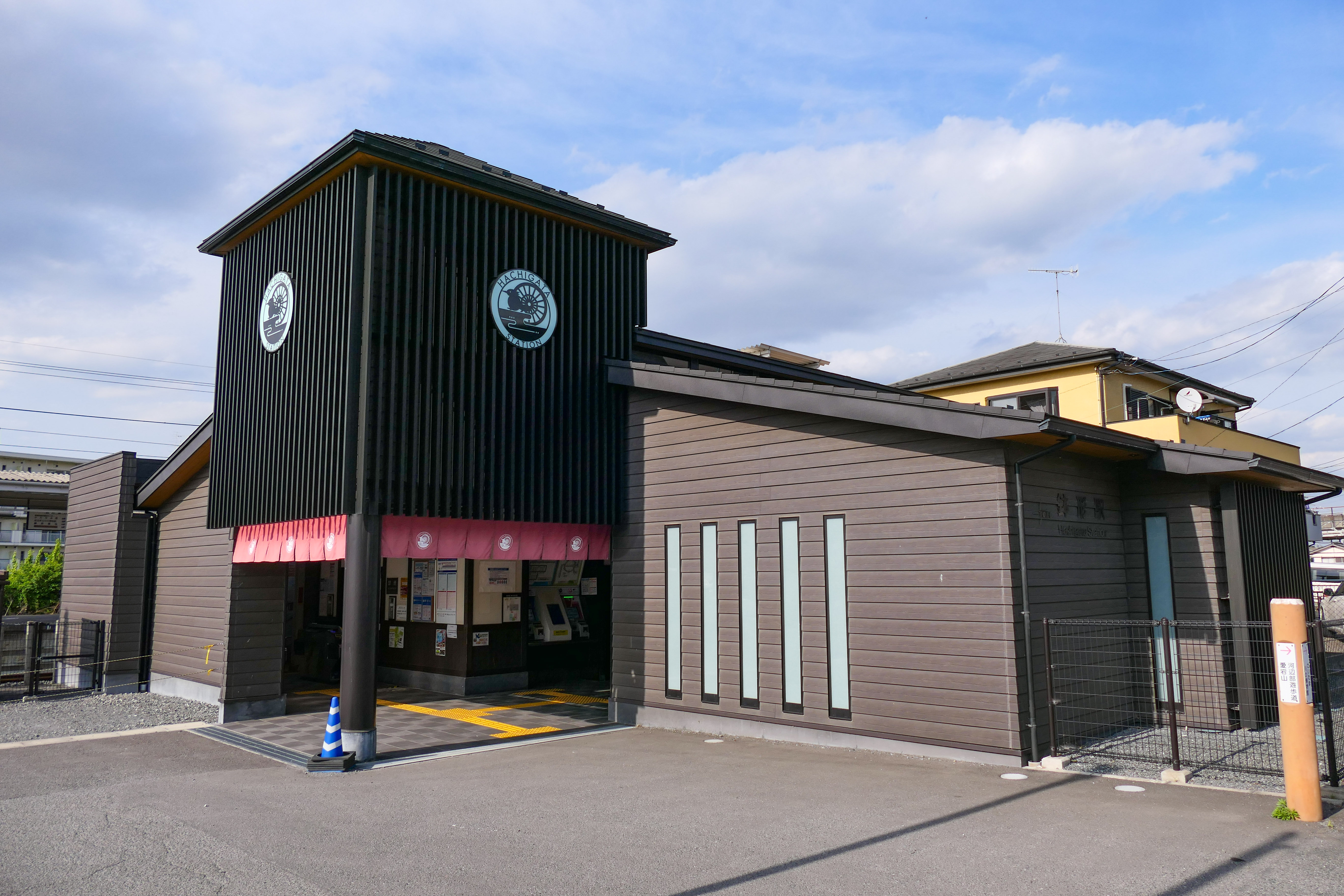
- Hachigata Station in April 2021

General information
- Location: 16-1 Hachigata, Yorii-machi, Osato-gun, Saitama-ken 369-1224; Japan
- Coordinates: 36.1140°N 139.2085°E
- Operator: Tōbu Railway
- Line: Tōbu Tōjō Line
- Distance: 73.5 km from Ikebukuro
- Platforms: 1 island platform
- Tracks: 2

Other information
- Station code: TJ-37
- Website: www.tobu.co.jp/railway/guide/station/info/7507/

History
- Opened: 10 July 1925
- Rebuilt: 2015

Passengers
- FY2019: 967 daily

Services
| Preceding station | Tobu Railway | Following station |
|---|---|---|
| Tamayodo TJ38 towards Yorii | Tojo Line | Obusuma TJ36 towards Ogawamachi |
Location
- Location within Saitama Prefecture Location within Japan

Hachigata Station (鉢形駅, Hachigata-eki) is a passenger railway station in the town of Yorii, Saitama, Japan, operated by the private railway operator Tōbu Railway.

== Lines ==
Hachigata Station is served by the Tōbu Tōjō Line from Ikebukuro in Tokyo, and is located 73.5 km from the Ikebukuro terminus. During the daytime, the station is served by two "Local" (all-stations) trains per hour in each direction between Ogawamachi and Yorii. There are no direct trains to or from Ikebukuro.

== Station layout ==
The station consists of an island platform serving two tracks. The platforms are connected to the station building by a footbridge.

=== Platforms ===
| 1 | ■ Tōbu Tōjō Line | for Yorii |
| 2 | ■ Tōbu Tōjō Line | for Ogawamachi |

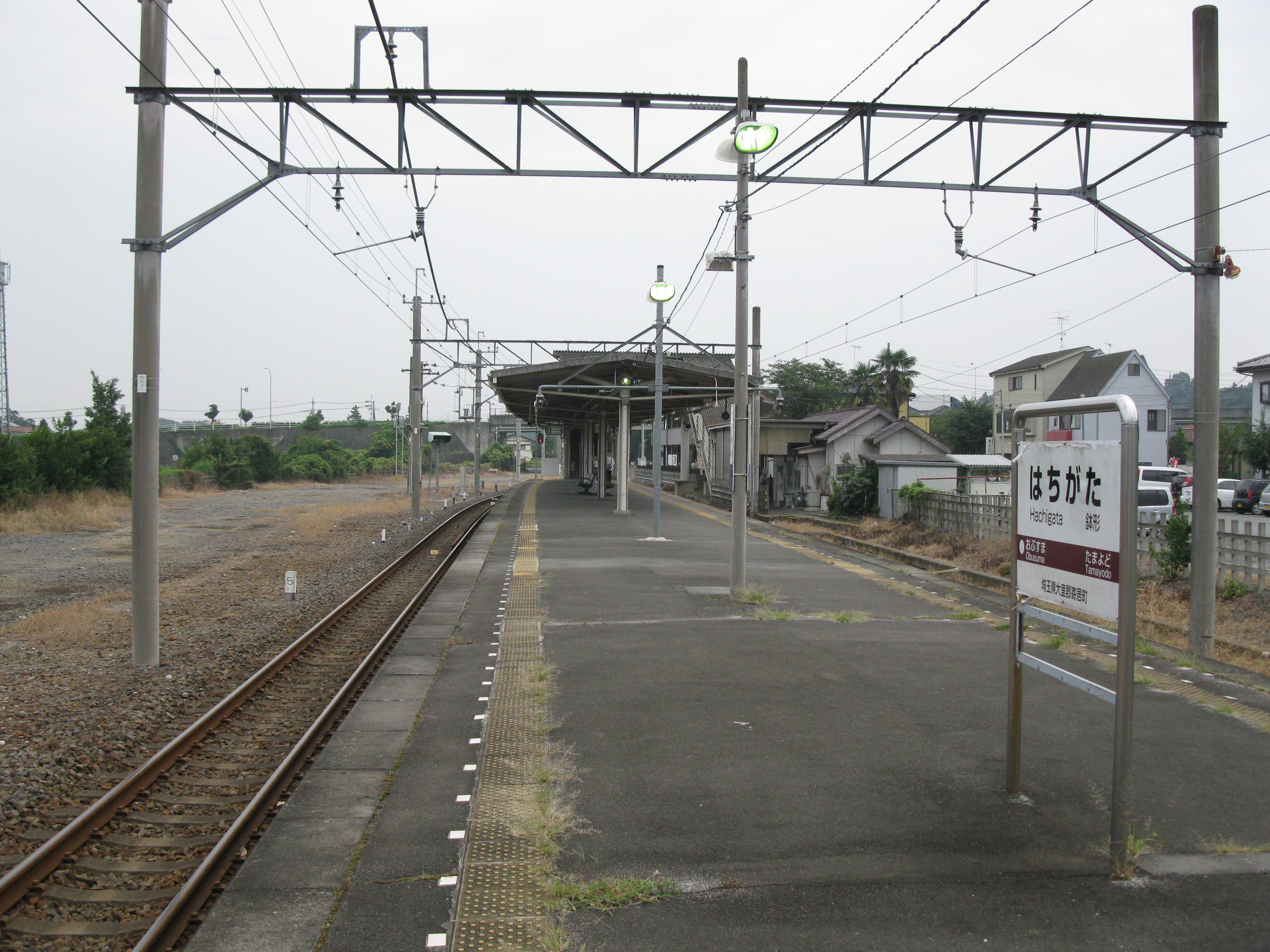
The view from the platform looking east, August 2009

== History ==
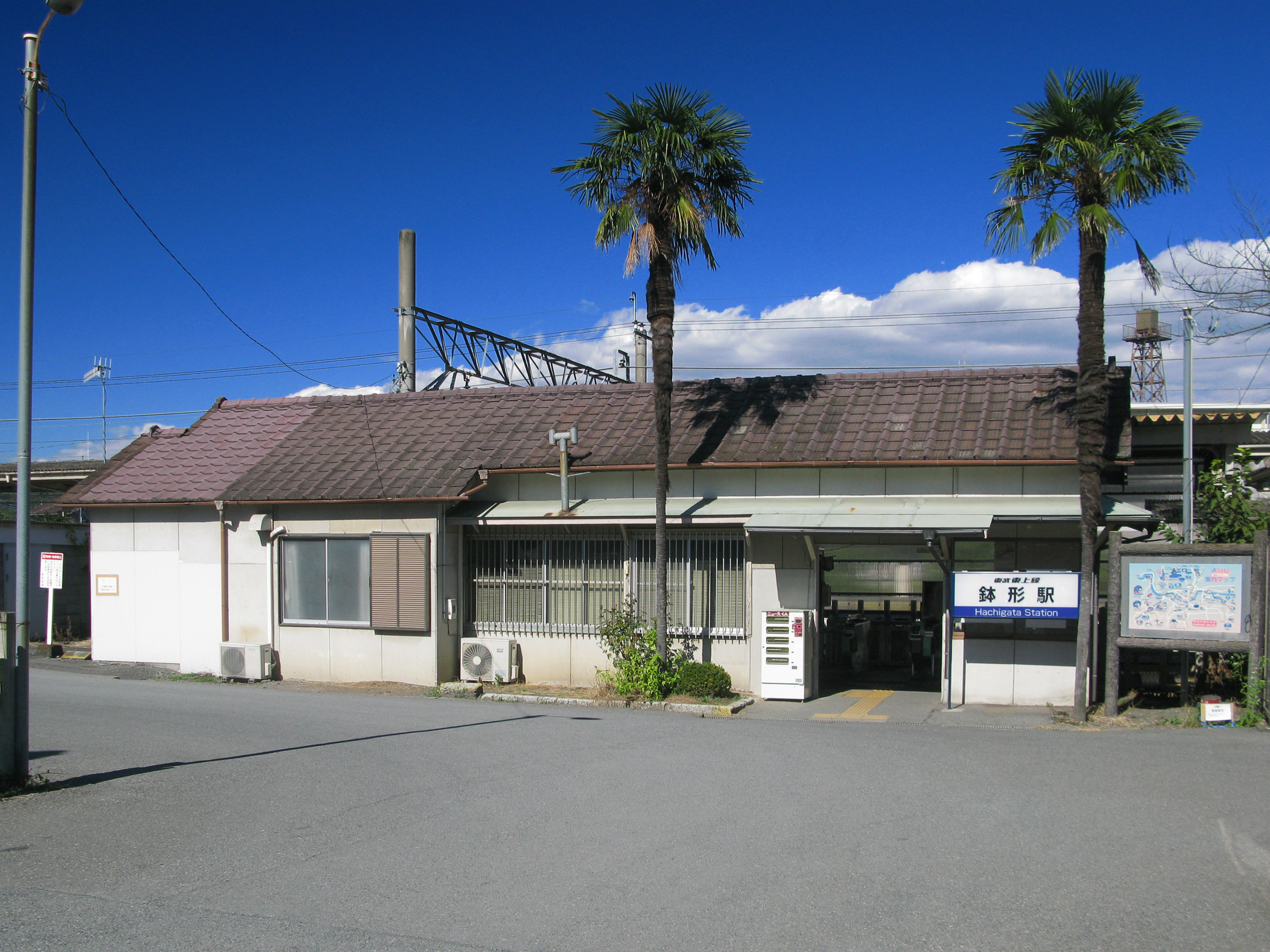
The station building in November 2012 before rebuilding

The station opened on 10 July 1925. The name comes from the former Hachigata Castle, the ruins of which remain nearby.

From 17 March 2012, station numbering was introduced on the Tōbu Tōjō Line, with Hachigata Station becoming "TJ-36".

A new station building was opened on 21 March 2015.

== Passenger statistics ==
In fiscal 2019, the station was used by an average of 967 passengers daily.

== Surrounding area ==
- Arakawa River
- National Route 254
- Saitama Museum of Rivers

== See also ==
- List of railway stations in Japan
