= Okabe, Saitama =

Dissolved municipality in Saitama prefecture, Japan

Okabe (岡部町, Okabe-machi) was a town located in Ōsato District, Saitama Prefecture, Japan.

As of 2005, the town had an estimated population of 18,754 and a density of 613.07 persons per km^{2}. The total area was 30.59 km^{2}.

On January 1, 2006, Okabe, along with the towns of Hanazono and Kawamoto (all from Ōsato District), was merged into the expanded city of Fukaya.
