= Kawamoto, Saitama =

Dissolved municipality in Saitama prefecture, Japan

Kawamoto (川本町, Kawamoto-machi) was a town located in Ōsato District, Saitama Prefecture, Japan.

As of 2005, the town had an estimated population of 12,120 and a density of 556.7 persons per km^{2}. The total area was 21.77 km^{2}.

On January 1, 2006, Kawamoto, along with the towns of Hanazono and Okabe (all from Ōsato District), was merged into the expanded city of Fukaya.
