= Minami-yorii Station =

Railway station in Yorii, Saitama prefecture, Japan

TJ35 Minami-yorii Station (Honda Yorii-mae) みなみ寄居駅〈ホンダ寄居前駅〉
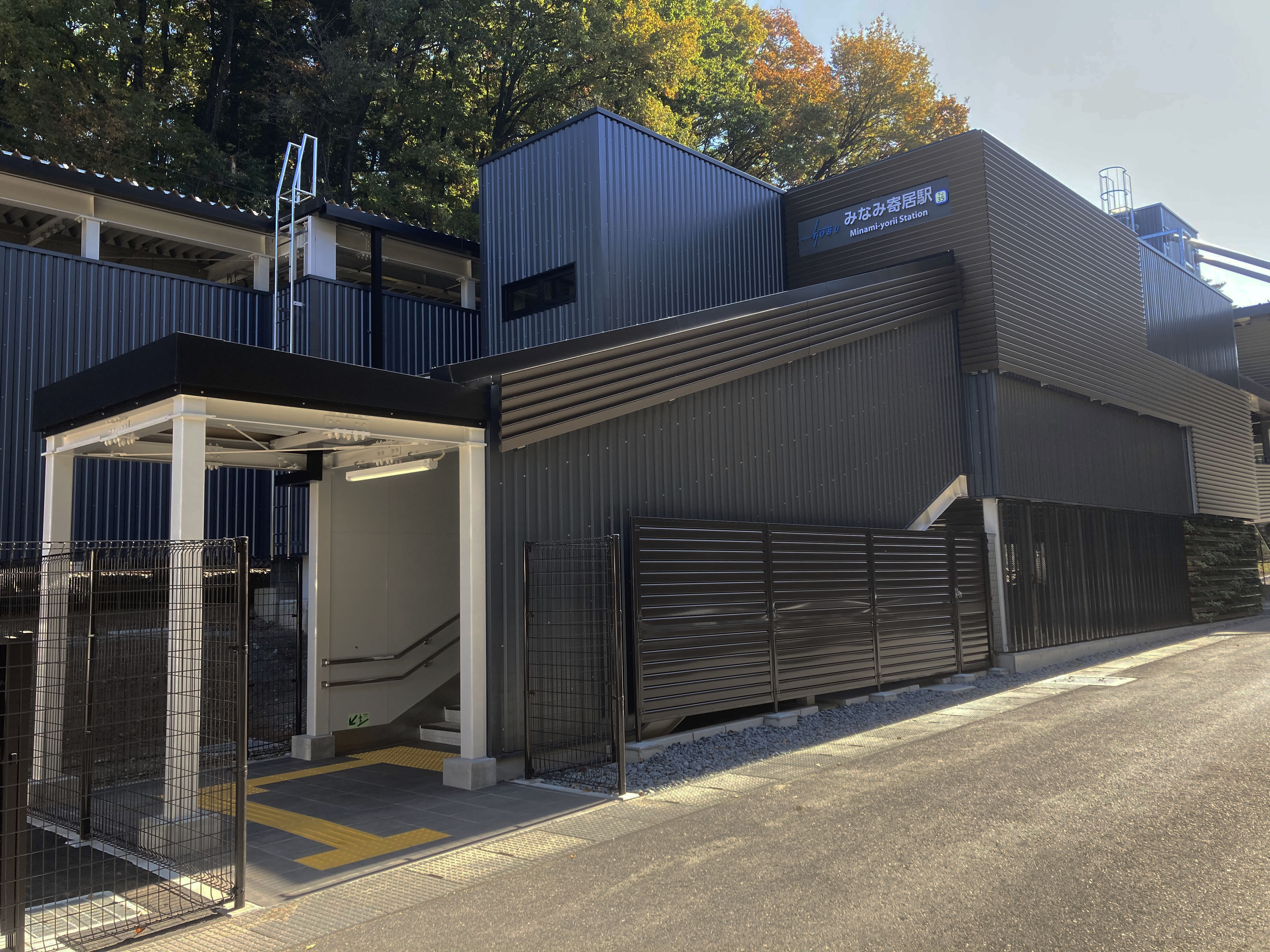
- Station building in November 2020

General information
- Location: 997-14 Tomida, Yorii-machi, Ōsato-gun, Saitama-ken 369-1216; Japan
- Coordinates: 36.091067°N 139.236431°E
- Operator: Tōbu Railway
- Line: Tōbu Tōjō Line
- Distance: 68.9 km from Ikebukuro
- Platforms: 1 side platform
- Tracks: 1

Construction
- Parking: Yes
- Cycle facilities: Yes
- Accessible: Passenger lifts

Other information
- Station code: TJ-35
- Website: Official website

History
- Opened: 31 October 2020; 5 years ago

Services
Preceding station	Tobu Railway	Following station
Obusuma TJ36 towards Yorii	Tojo Line	Tōbu-Takezawa TJ34 towards Ogawamachi
Location
- Location within Saitama Prefecture Location within Japan

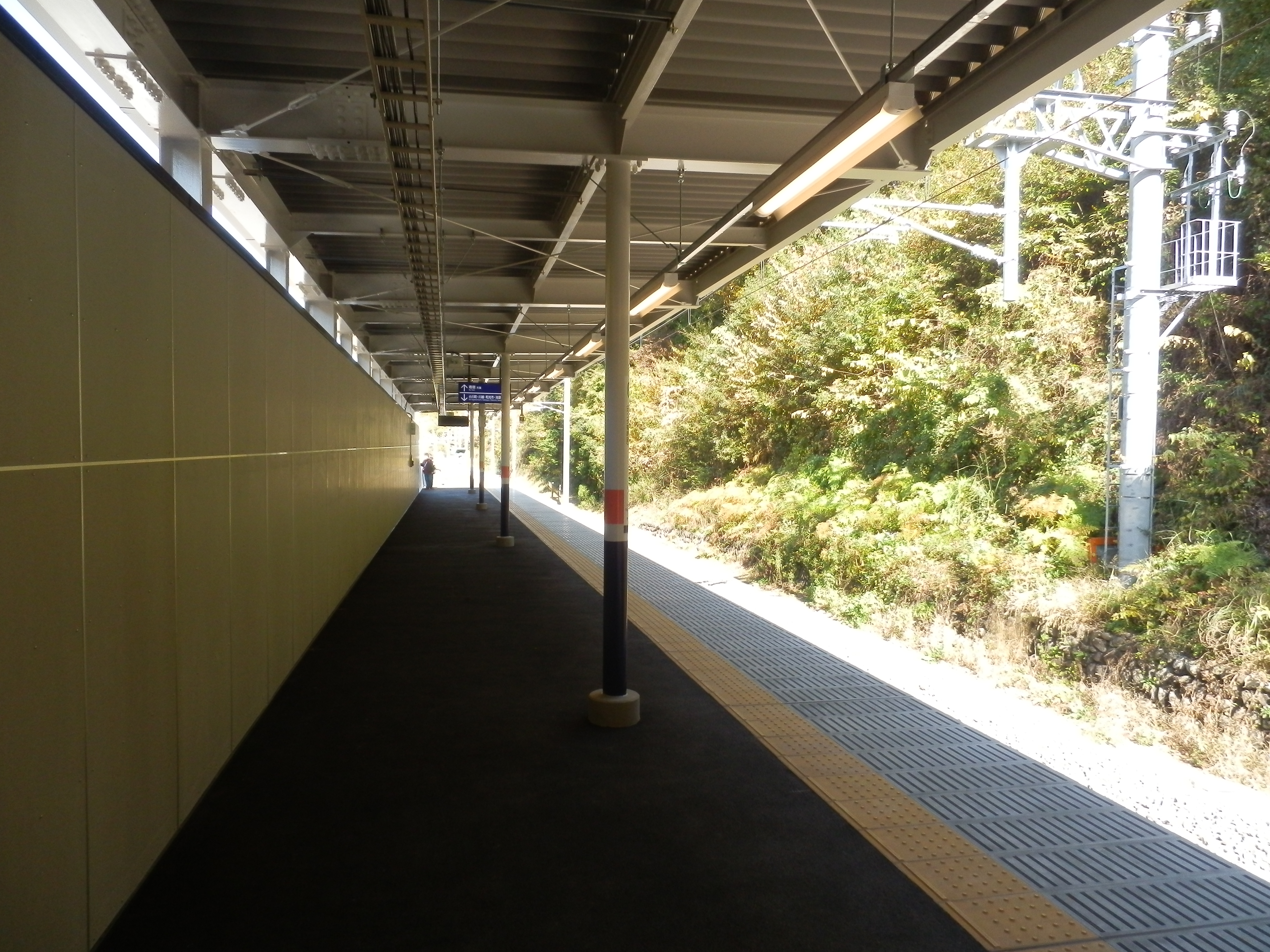
Platform

Minami-yorii Station (みなみ寄居駅, Minami-Yorii-eki) is a passenger railway station in the town of Yorii, Saitama, Japan. It is operated by the private railway operator Tōbu Railway.

== Routes ==
Minami-yorii Station is served by the Tōbu Tōjō Line from Ikebukuro in Tokyo, and is 68.9 km from the Ikebukuro terminus. During the daytime, the station is served by two "Local" (all-stations) trains per hour in each direction between Ogawamachi and Yorii. There are no direct trains to or from Ikebukuro.

== Station ==
The station consists of a side platform serving one track. The platform that corresponds to a four-car train has a 90 m (300 ft) length.

Entrance to the station are provided on the west side, both from the ladder in first floor and the pedestrian crossing towards Honda Motor Yorii Automobile Plant in third floor, exclusively for people involved in the plant. Passengers used several fare gates and went out outside of baffle gates because fare calculation had special circumstances. Inbound passengers could use an automatic ticket gate. Outbound travelers could not use automatic ticket gates, so passengers had to get certification upon boarding on the trains (ja:乗車証明書) until Tojo Line's timetable was revised 13 March 2021.

=== Platform ===
Outbound and inbound trains share one platform.

Outbound	■ Tōbu Tōjō Line	For Yorii
Inbound	■ Tōbu Tōjō Line	For Ogawamachi (Kawagoe, Wakoshi and Ikebukuro)

== History ==
In November 2018, in conjunction with Honda Motor's decision to relocate its factory from Sayama to Yorii, Tōbu Railway was approached to build a station to help alleviate anticipated traffic congestion on Japan National Route 254. Construction began in June 2019 and the new station opened on 31 October 2020. The station subname, Honda Yorii-mae, added in anticipation that the station will be frequently used by many people involved in the plant.

== Surrounding area ==
- Honda Motor Yorii Automobile Plant

== See also ==
- List of railway stations in Japan
