= Yorii =

Yorii 寄居町
- Town
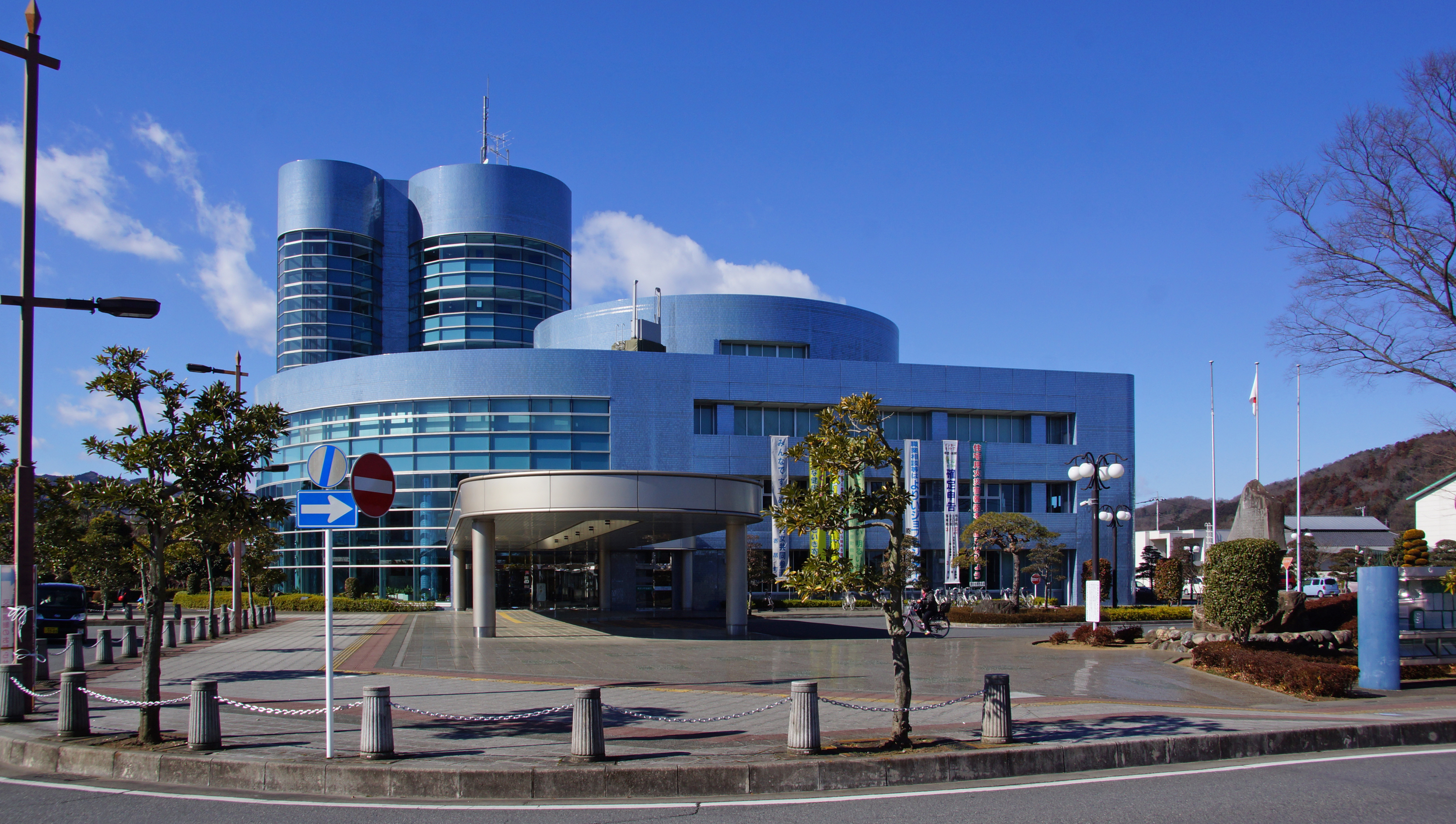
- Yorii town office in February 2011

- Flag Seal

- Location of Yorii in Saitama Prefecture

- Coordinates: 36°7′6″N 139°11′34.7″E
- Country: Japan
- Region: Kantō
- Prefecture: Saitama
- District: Ōsato

Area
  - Total: 64.25 km^{2} (24.81 sq mi)

Population (March 2021)
  - Total: 32,851
  - Density: 511.3/km^{2} (1,324/sq mi)
- Time zone: UTC+9 (Japan Standard Time)
- Phone number: 048-581-2121
- Address: 1080-1 Yorii, Yorii-machi, Ōsato-gun, Saitama-ken 369-1292
- Climate: Cfa
- Website: Official website
- Symbols
- Bird: Green pheasant
- Flower: Erythronium japonicum
- Tree: Prunus serrulata

Yorii (寄居町, Yorii-machi) is a town in Saitama Prefecture, Japan. As of 1 March 2021, the town had an estimated population of 32,851 in 14,689 households and a population density of 510 persons per km^{2}. The total area of the town is 64.25 square kilometres (24.81 sq mi).

== Geography ==
Located in northwestern Saitama Prefecture, Yorii is on the central reaches of the Arakawa River, just downstream of Nagatoro, and is approximately 70 kilometers from downtown Tokyo.

=== Surrounding municipalities ===
Saitama Prefecture

- Fukaya
- Higashichichibu
- Minano
- Misato
- Nagatoro
- Ogawa
- Ranzan

=== Climate ===
Yorii has a humid subtropical climate (Köppen Cfa) characterized by warm summers and cool winters with light to no snowfall. The average annual temperature in Ageo is 13.47°C. The average annual rainfall is 1746 mm with September as the wettest month. The temperatures are highest on average in August, at around 24.9 °C, and lowest in January, at around 2.2 °C.

Climate data for Yorii (1991−2020 normals, extremes 1977−present)
| Month | Jan | Feb | Mar | Apr | May | Jun | Jul | Aug | Sep | Oct | Nov | Dec | Year |
|---|---|---|---|---|---|---|---|---|---|---|---|---|---|
| Record high °C (°F) | 19.9 (67.8) | 24.0 (75.2) | 27.1 (80.8) | 32.3 (90.1) | 35.6 (96.1) | 39.2 (102.6) | 39.9 (103.8) | 39.5 (103.1) | 38.4 (101.1) | 33.0 (91.4) | 26.8 (80.2) | 25.6 (78.1) | 39.9 (103.8) |
| Mean daily maximum °C (°F) | 9.3 (48.7) | 10.1 (50.2) | 13.6 (56.5) | 19.4 (66.9) | 24.1 (75.4) | 26.5 (79.7) | 30.3 (86.5) | 31.7 (89.1) | 27.2 (81.0) | 21.6 (70.9) | 16.4 (61.5) | 11.7 (53.1) | 20.2 (68.3) |
| Daily mean °C (°F) | 3.1 (37.6) | 4.0 (39.2) | 7.4 (45.3) | 12.8 (55.0) | 17.7 (63.9) | 21.2 (70.2) | 25.0 (77.0) | 26.0 (78.8) | 22.1 (71.8) | 16.3 (61.3) | 10.4 (50.7) | 5.3 (41.5) | 14.3 (57.7) |
| Mean daily minimum °C (°F) | −2.2 (28.0) | −1.4 (29.5) | 1.8 (35.2) | 6.9 (44.4) | 12.3 (54.1) | 17.0 (62.6) | 21.2 (70.2) | 22.1 (71.8) | 18.4 (65.1) | 12.3 (54.1) | 5.6 (42.1) | 0.1 (32.2) | 9.5 (49.1) |
| Record low °C (°F) | −9.2 (15.4) | −8.2 (17.2) | −6.1 (21.0) | −3.1 (26.4) | 2.2 (36.0) | 7.1 (44.8) | 14.3 (57.7) | 14.5 (58.1) | 7.7 (45.9) | 2.5 (36.5) | −3.3 (26.1) | −8.2 (17.2) | −9.2 (15.4) |
| Average precipitation mm (inches) | 36.1 (1.42) | 28.9 (1.14) | 61.2 (2.41) | 84.9 (3.34) | 110.2 (4.34) | 160.1 (6.30) | 179.4 (7.06) | 174.3 (6.86) | 210.3 (8.28) | 185.7 (7.31) | 45.0 (1.77) | 28.3 (1.11) | 1,304.4 (51.35) |
| Average precipitation days (≥ 1.0 mm) | 3.5 | 3.9 | 7.7 | 8.2 | 9.6 | 12.7 | 13.0 | 10.1 | 11.7 | 9.2 | 5.1 | 3.5 | 98.2 |
| Mean monthly sunshine hours | 210.0 | 194.2 | 201.9 | 190.6 | 181.5 | 129.0 | 144.1 | 164.6 | 128.5 | 141.6 | 168.4 | 196.5 | 2,059 |
Source: JMA

== Demographics ==
Per Japanese census data, the population of Yorii peaked around the year 2000 and had declined since.

Historical population
| Year | Pop. | ±% |
|---|---|---|
| 1950 | 26,857 | — |
| 1960 | 25,478 | −5.1% |
| 1970 | 25,137 | −1.3% |
| 1980 | 28,469 | +13.3% |
| 1990 | 33,659 | +18.2% |
| 2000 | 37,724 | +12.1% |
| 2010 | 35,774 | −5.2% |
| 2020 | 32,374 | −9.5% |

== History ==
Yorii developed as a post station on the pilgrimage route to the temples of the Chichibu area from the Kamakura period, and was a castle town to Hachigata Castle during the Sengoku period. The town of Yorii was created within Hanzawa District, Saitama with the establishment of the modern municipalities system on April 1, 1889. Hanzawa District was abolished in 1896, becoming part of Ōsato District.

In February 1955, the town expanded by annexing the neighboring villages of Orihara, Hachigata, Obusuma, and Yodo.

== Government ==
Yorii has a mayor-council form of government with a directly elected mayor and a unicameral town council of 16 members. Yorii, together with the town of Misato and city of Fukaya, contributes three members to the Saitama Prefectural Assembly. In terms of national politics, the town is part of Saitama 11th district of the lower house of the Diet of Japan.

== Economy ==
Honda has an automobile assembly plant in Yorii, which is a major local employer.

== Education ==
Yorii has six public elementary schools and three public middle schools operated by the town government, and one public high school operated by the Saitama Prefectural Board of Education.

== Transportation ==
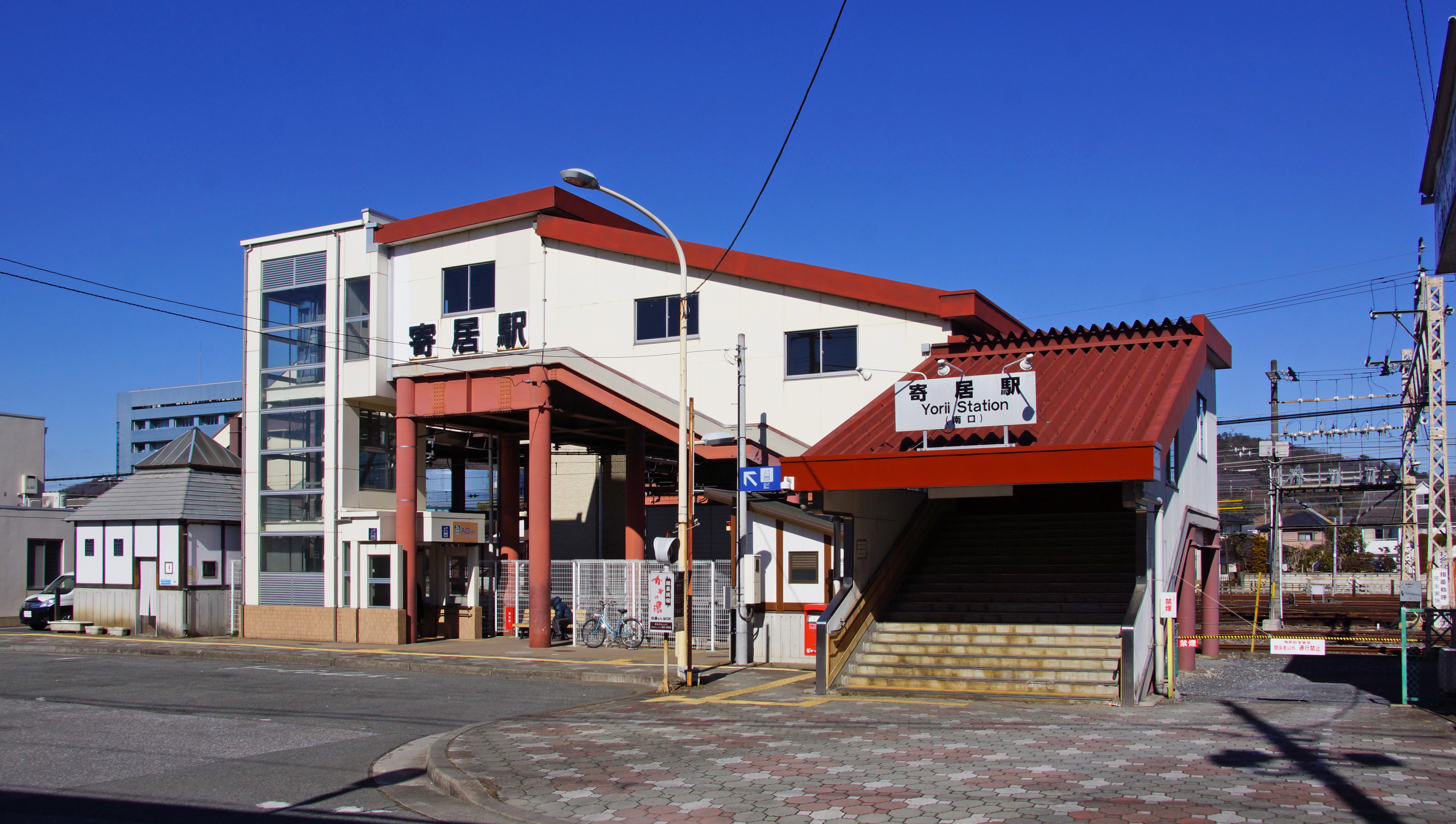
Yorii Station in February 2017

=== Railway ===
Chichibu Railway - Chichibu Main Line

- Sakurazawa – Yorii – Hagure

Tobu Railway – Tōbu Tōjō Line

- Minami-Yorii – Obusuma - Hachigata - Tamayodo| - Yorii

JR East – Hachikō Line

- Orihara - Yorii - Yōdo

=== Highway ===
- National Route 140
- National Route 254

== Sister cities ==
- Marysville, Ohio, United States, since 2013

== Local attractions ==
- Hachigata Castle
- Saitama Museum of Rivers
- Tamayodo Dam
- Tsuburada Dam

== Noted people from Yorii ==
- Chizuru Arai, Olympic gold medal judoka
- Kazuichi Hanawa, Mangaka
