= Fukaya =

Fukaya 深谷市
- City
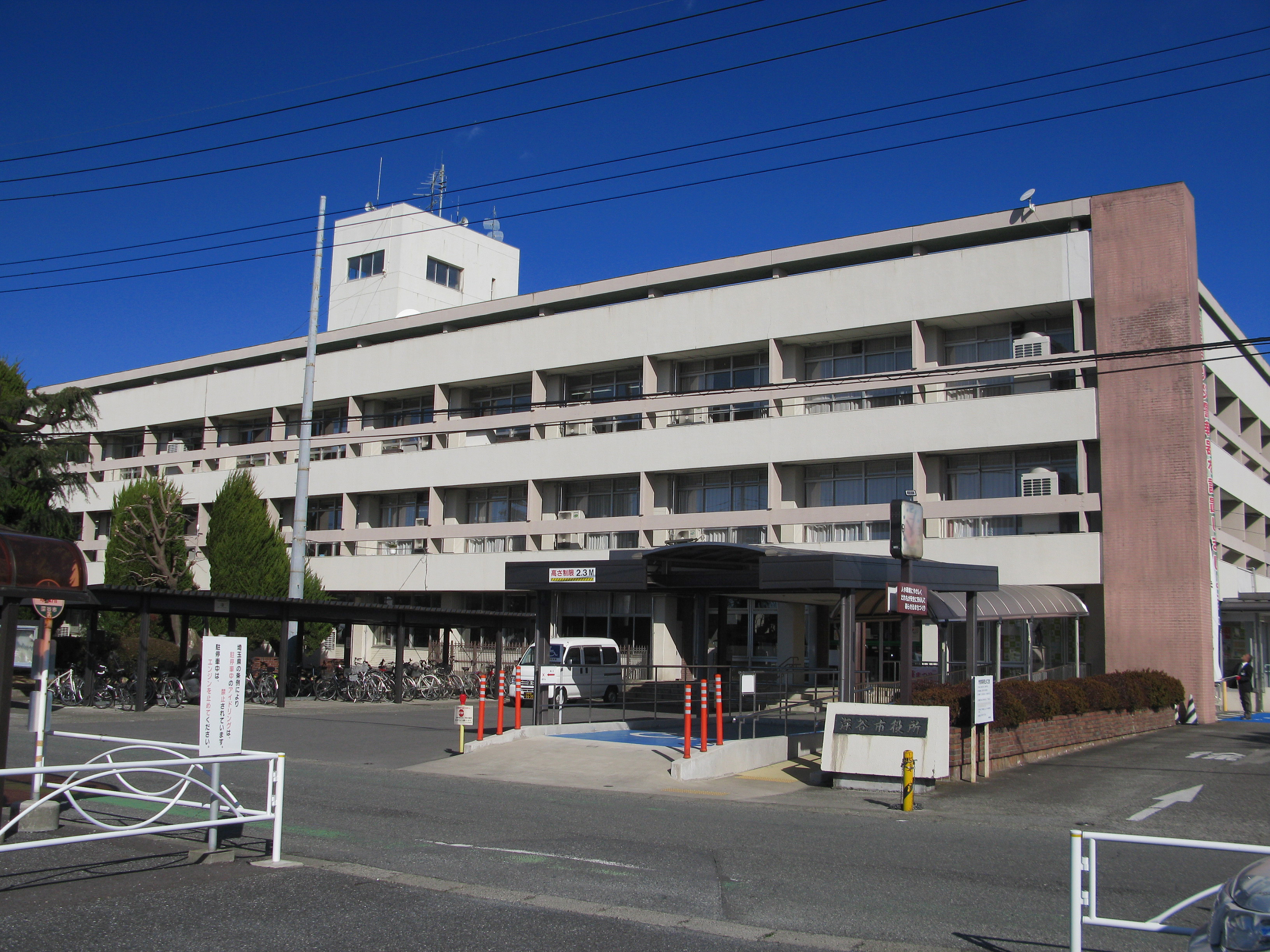
- Fukaya City Hall

- Flag Seal

- Location of Fukaya in Saitama Prefecture

- Coordinates: 36°11′50.9″N 139°16′53.4″E
- Country: Japan
- Region: Kantō
- Prefecture: Saitama

Government
  - Mayor: Susumu Kojima (Ind.)

Area
  - Total: 138.37 km^{2} (53.42 sq mi)

Population (January 2021)
  - Total: 142,803
  - Density: 1,026/km^{2} (2,660/sq mi)
- Time zone: UTC+9 (Japan Standard Time)
- Tree: Camellia
- Flower: Tulip
- Phone number: 048-571-1211
- Address: 11-1 Nakamachi, Fukaya-shi, Saitama-ken 366-8501
- Website: Official website

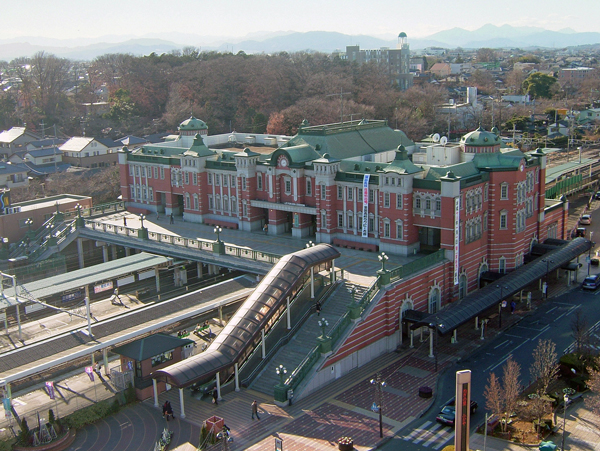
Fukaya Station

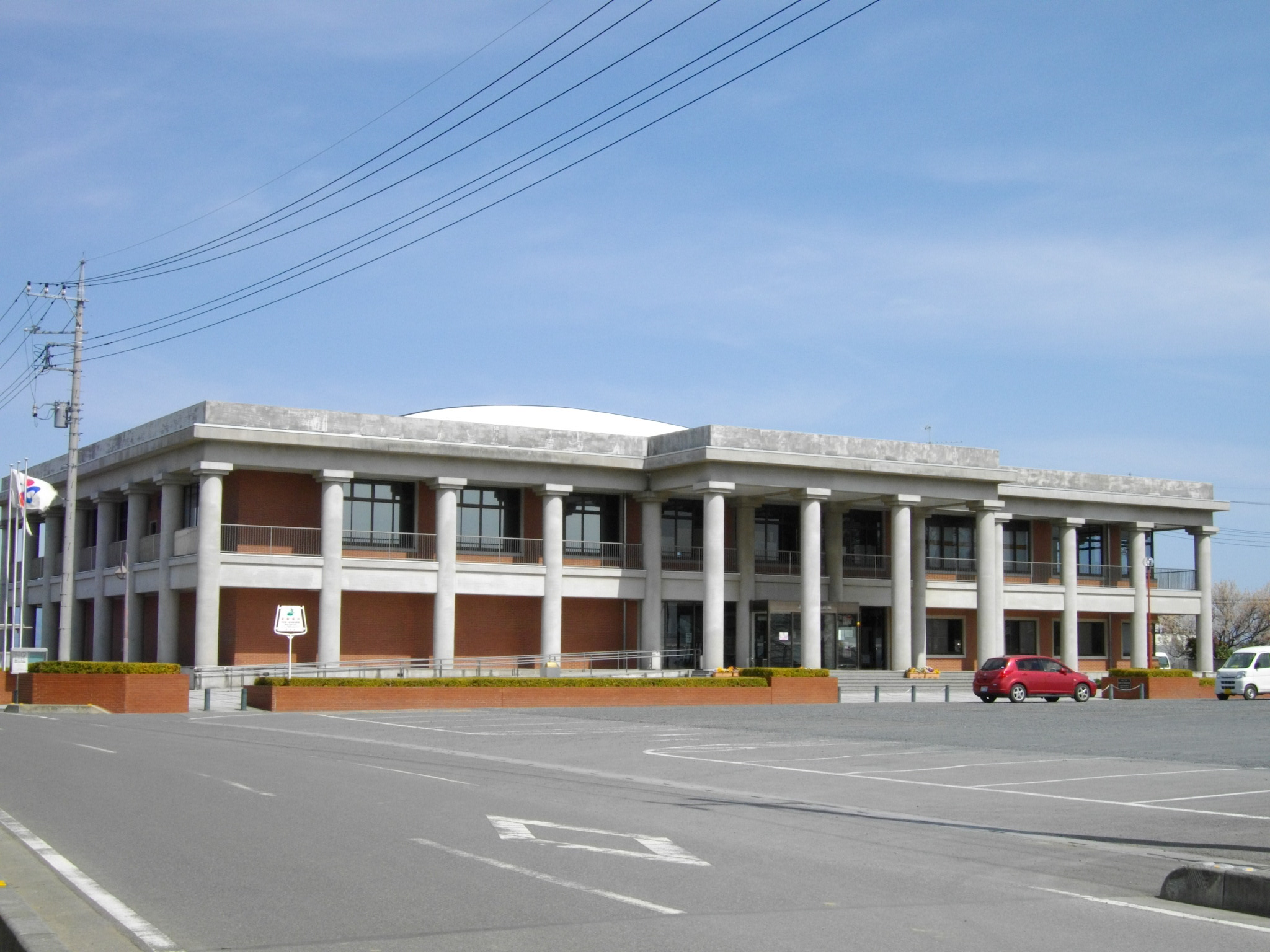
Eiichi Shibusawa Memorial Museum

Fukaya (深谷市, Fukaya-shi) is a city located in Saitama Prefecture, Japan. As of 1 January 2021, the city had an estimated population of 229,517 in 142,803 households in 60804 households and a population density of 1023 persons per km^{2}. The total area of the city is 138.37 square kilometres (53.42 sq mi). It is famous for a variety of welsh onions or Fukaya-negi (深谷ネギ).

== Geography ==
Fukaya is located on the northern border of Saitama Prefecture, in the flatlands of the Kantō plain, in-between the Tone River and the Arakawa River.

=== Surrounding municipalities ===
Gunma Prefecture

- Isesaki
- Ōta

Saitama Prefecture

- Honjō
- Kumagaya
- Misato
- Ranzan
- Yorii

=== Climate ===
Fukaya has a humid subtropical climate (Köppen Cfa) characterized by warm summers and cool winters with light to no snowfall. The average annual temperature in Fukaya is 14.5 °C. The average annual rainfall is 1270 mm with September as the wettest month. The temperatures are highest on average in August, at around 26.7 °C, and lowest in January, at around 3.4 °C.

== Demographics ==
Per Japanese census data, the population of Fukaya has recently plateaued after a long period of growth.

Historical population
Year	Pop.	±%
1920	68,225	—
1930	71,943	+5.4%
1940	73,690	+2.4%
1950	96,804	+31.4%
1960	92,285	−4.7%
1970	101,459	+9.9%
1980	120,931	+19.2%
1990	135,927	+12.4%
2000	146,562	+7.8%
2010	144,618	−1.3%
2020	141,268	−2.3%

== History ==
Fukaya was the site of a castle built by the Uesugi clan in 1456, and later the site of Okabe Domain a feudal domain under the Tokugawa shogunate. In the Edo era, Fukaya-shuku was a major post town on the Nakasendō (中山道) highway, boasting over 80 inns.

The town of Fukaya was established within Hanzawa District, Saitama with the establishment of the modern municipalities system on 1 April 1889. Hanzawa District was abolished in 1896, becoming part of Ōsato District. Fukaya merged with the villages of Aketo, Hatara, Oyori and Fujisawa on 1 January 1955, and was elevated to city status. It annexed the village of Toyosato on 1 April 1973. On 1 January 2006, the towns of Hanazono, Kawamoto and Okabe (all from Ōsato District) were merged into Fukaya.

== Government ==
Fukaya has a mayor-council form of government with a directly elected mayor and a unicameral city council of 24 members. Fukaya, together with the towns of Misato and Yorii, contributes three members to the Saitama Prefectural Assembly. In terms of national politics, the city is part of Saitama 11th district of the lower house of the Diet of Japan.

== Economy ==
The economy of Fukaya is dominated by agriculture, with welsh onions and tulips as famous local crops. Industrial parks are located in the eastern portion of the city, and the manufacture of bricks is a major local industry.

== Education ==
=== Universities ===
- Saitama Institute of Technology (埼玉工業大学)
- Tohto College of Health Sciences (東都医療大学)

=== High schools ===
- Prefectural Fukaya High School (埼玉県立深谷高等学校)
- Prefectural Fukaya Commercial High School (埼玉県立深谷商業高等学校)
- Prefectural Fukaya Daiichi High School (埼玉県立深谷第一高等学校)
- Private Shōchi Fukaya High School (私立正智深谷高等学校)
- Private Tokyo Seitoku University Fukaya High School (私立東京成徳大学深谷高等学校)

=== Middle schools ===
- Municipal Fukaya Middle School (市立深谷中学校)
- Municipal Kamishiba Middle School (市立上柴中学校)
- Municipal Fujisawa Middle School (市立藤沢中学校)
- Municipal Hatara Middle School (市立幡羅中学校)
- Municipal Aketo Middle School (市立明戸中学校)
- Municipal Toyosato Middle School (市立豊里中学校)
- Municipal Okabe Middle School (市立岡部中学校)
- Municipal Hanazono Middle School (市立花園中学校)
- Municipal Kawamoto Middle School (市立川本中学校)
- Municipal Minami Middle School (市立南中学校)

=== Elementary schools ===
- Municipal Fukaya Elementary School (市立深谷小学校)
- Municipal Fukaya West Elementary School (市立深谷西小学校)
- Municipal Kamishiba East Elementary School (市立上柴東小学校)
- Municipal Kamishiba West Elementary School (市立上柴西小学校)
- Municipal Sakuragaoka Elementary School (市立桜ヶ丘小学校)
- Municipal Fujisawa Elementary School (市立藤沢小学校)
- Municipal Hatara Elementary School (市立幡羅小学校)
- Municipal Tokiwa Elementary School (市立常盤小学校)
- Municipal Ōyori Elementary School (市立大寄小学校)
- Municipal Aketo Elementary School (市立明戸小学校)
- Municipal Toyosato Elementary School (市立豊里小学校)
- Municipal Yatsumoto Elementary School (市立八基小学校)
- Municipal Okabe Elementary School (市立岡部小学校)
- Municipal Okabe West Elementary School (市立岡部西小学校)
- Municipal Hanzawa Elementary School (市立榛沢小学校)
- Municipal Hongō Elementary School (市立本郷小学校)
- Municipal Hanazono Elementary School (市立花園小学校)
- Municipal Kawamoto North Elementary School (市立川本北小学校)
- Municipal Kawamoto South Elementary School (市立川本南小学校)

== Transportation ==
=== Railway ===
JR East – Takasaki Line

- Fukaya - Okabe

Chichibu Railway – Chichibu Main Line

- Aketo - Takekawa - Nagata - Fukaya Hanazono - Omaeda

=== Highway ===
- Kan-etsu Expressway – Hanazono IC
- National Route 17
- National Route 140
- National Route 254

== Sister cities ==
- Dalby, Queensland, Australia
- Fremont, California, United States, since 26 January 1980
- Shunyi District, Beijing, China, since 7 November 1995

== Local attractions ==
- Site of Fukaya Castle
- Birthplace of Shibusawa Eiichi
- Shibusawa Eiichi Memorial Museum
- Takinomiya Jinja

== Mascot ==
Fukka-chan (ふっかちゃん) is the city's local character (Yuru-chara), as well as a mascot. It was created on 28 June 2010. It is said to be a fictitious life form like a rabbit and a deer. Fukka-chan is widely described as a city's popular mascot character.

== Notable people from Fukaya ==
- Shibusawa Eiichi, industrialist
- Mimura, actress
- Momoka Muraoka, para-alpine skier
- Yasuo Takei, founder of Takefuji
