= Okabe Domain =

Okabe Domain 岡部藩
- under Tokugawa shogunate Japan
- 1649–1871
- Capital: Okabe jin'ya
  - Type: Daimyō
- Historical era: Edo period
  - Established: 1649
  - Disestablished: 1871
- Today part of: part of Saitama Prefecture

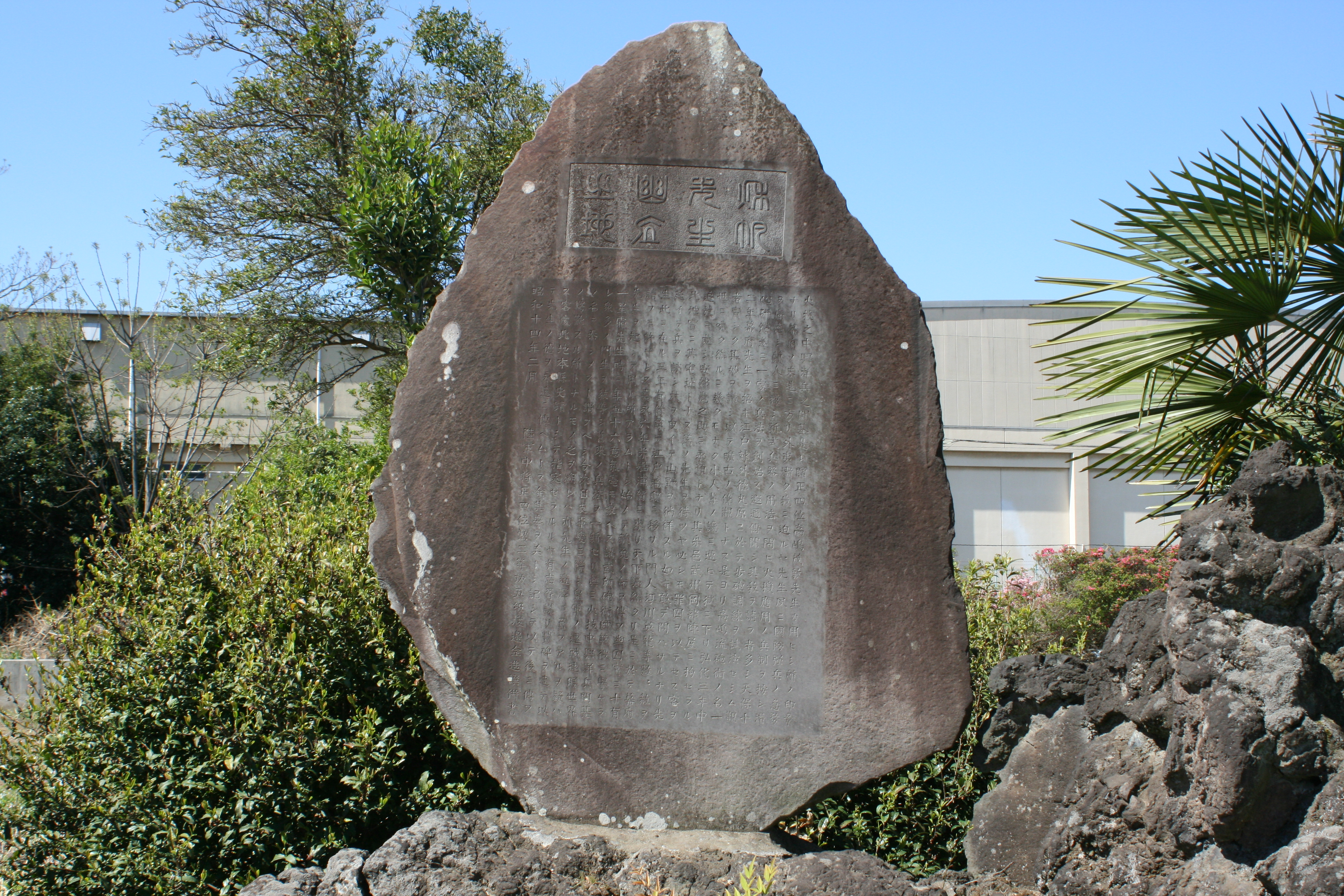
Monument marking site of the Okabe Jin'ya, administrative center of Okabe Domain in Fukaya, Saitama

Okabe Domain (岡部藩, Okabe-han) was a feudal domain under the Tokugawa shogunate of Edo period Japan, located in Musashi Province (modern-day Saitama Prefecture), Japan. It was centered on Okabe jin'ya in what is now part of the city of Fukaya, Saitama.

== History ==
The Abe clan were retainers of the Imagawa clan, and later went into the service of Tokugawa Ieyasu. Abe Nobumori was a 5250 koku hatamoto who served under Honda Masanobu at the Battle of Sekigahara. He subsequently served under Tokugawa Hidetada at the Siege of Osaka, but was not given an increase in revenues until he was awarded 4000 koku in 1636. In 1649, he was appointed commander of Osaka Castle, which came with a 10,000 koku stipend, which gave him enough for the title of daimyō. However, his 19,250 koku consisted of widely scattered holdings in Musashi, Settsu, Mikawa and Shimotsuke provinces.

His son, Abe Nobuyuki, gave 1000 koku to each of his two brothers in 1662; however, on his appointment as Deputy Commander of Osaka Castle in 1677, he received an increase of 3000 koku, bringing the domain to 20,250 koku. Nobuyuki’s son Abe Nobutomo received a further increase of 2000 koku in 1682. However, his son Abe Nobumine turned 2000 koku over to a younger brother in 1701. Nobumine also moved the seat of the domain to Okabe in Musashi Province.

Likewise, the 5th daimyo, Abe Nobukata, gave 1000 koku to his younger brother in 1706.

The 13th and final daimyō, Abe Nobuoki, participated in the suppression of the Mito Rebellion, but otherwise played little part in the Boshin War and pledged himself to the Meiji government in 1868. His holdings in Musashi were forfeited to the government, and he moved the seat of his domain to Hanhara in Mikawa Province (now part of Shinshiro, Aichi), where he continued to rule over the remainder of his domain until the abolition of the han system in 1871.

== Holdings at the end of the Edo period ==
As with most domains in the han system, Okabe Domain consisted of several discontinuous territories calculated to provide the assigned kokudaka, based on periodic cadastral surveys and projected agricultural yields.

- Musashi Province
  - 10 villages in Hanzawa District
- Kōzuke Province
  - 4 villages in Nitta District
- Mikawa Province
  - 2 villages in Hoi District
  - 9 villages in Yana District
- Settsu Province
  - 12 villages in Toyoshima District
  - 3 villages in Nose District
  - 3 villages in Kawabe District
  - 6 villages in Arima District
- Tanba Province
  - 1 village in Ikaruga District
  - 2 villages in Amata District

== List of daimyōs ==
#	Name	Tenure	Courtesy title	Court Rank	kokudaka
Abe clan (fudai) 1649–1871
1	Abe Nobumori (安部信盛)	1649–1662	Settsu-no-kami (摂津守)	Lower 5th (従五位下)	19,250 koku
2	Abe Nobuyuki (安部信之)	1662–1678	Tanba-no-kami (丹波守)	Lower 5th (従五位下)	19,250 → 17,250 → 20,250 koku
3	Abe Nobutomo (安部信友)	1678–1701	Settsu-no-kami (摂津守)	Lower 5th (従五位下)	20,250 → 22,250 koku
4	Abe Nobumine (安部信峯)	1701–1706	Tanba-no-kami (丹波守)	Lower 5th (従五位下)	22,250 → 20,250 koku
5	Abe Nobukata (安部信賢)	1706–1723	Settsu-no-kami (摂津守)	Lower 5th (従五位下)	20,250 → 19,250 koku
6	Abe Nobuhira (安部信平)	1723–1750	Settsu-no-kami (摂津守)	Lower 5th (従五位下)	19,250 koku
7	Abe Nobuchika (安部信允)	1750–1782	Settsu-no-kami (摂津守)	Lower 5th (従五位下)	19,250 koku
8	Abe Nobumichi (安部信享)	1781–1806	Settsu-no-kami (摂津守)	Lower 5th (従五位下)	19,250 koku
9	Abe Nobumochi (安部信操)	1806–1825	Settsu-no-kami (摂津守)	Lower 5th (従五位下)	19,250 koku
10	Abe Nobuyori (安部信任)	1825–1828	Tanba-no-kami (丹波守)	Lower 5th (従五位下)	19,250 koku
11	Abe Nobuhisa (安部信古)	1828–1842	Settsu-no-kami (摂津守)	Lower 5th (従五位下)	19,250 koku
12	Abe Nobutaka (安部信宝)	1842–1863	Settsu-no-kami (摂津守)	Lower 5th (従五位下)	19,250 koku
13	Abe Nobuoki (安部信発)	1863–1871	Settsu-no-kami (摂津守)	Lower 5th (従五位下)	19,250 koku
