= Menuma, Saitama =

Dissolved municipality in Ōsato district, Saitama prefecture, Japan (1913–2005)

Coordinates: 36°13′N 139°23′E

Menuma (妻沼町, Menuma-machi) was a town located in Ōsato District, Saitama Prefecture, Japan.

As of 2003, the town had an estimated population of 27,522 and a density of 758.81 persons per km^{2}. The total area was 36.27 km^{2}.

On October 1, 2005, Menuma, along with the town of Ōsato (also from Ōsato District), was merged into the expanded city of Kumagaya. As such, the town no longer exists as an independent municipality.
