= Saitama Institute of Technology =

Coordinates: 36°11′45.6″N 139°14′20.9″E

- 埼玉工業大学
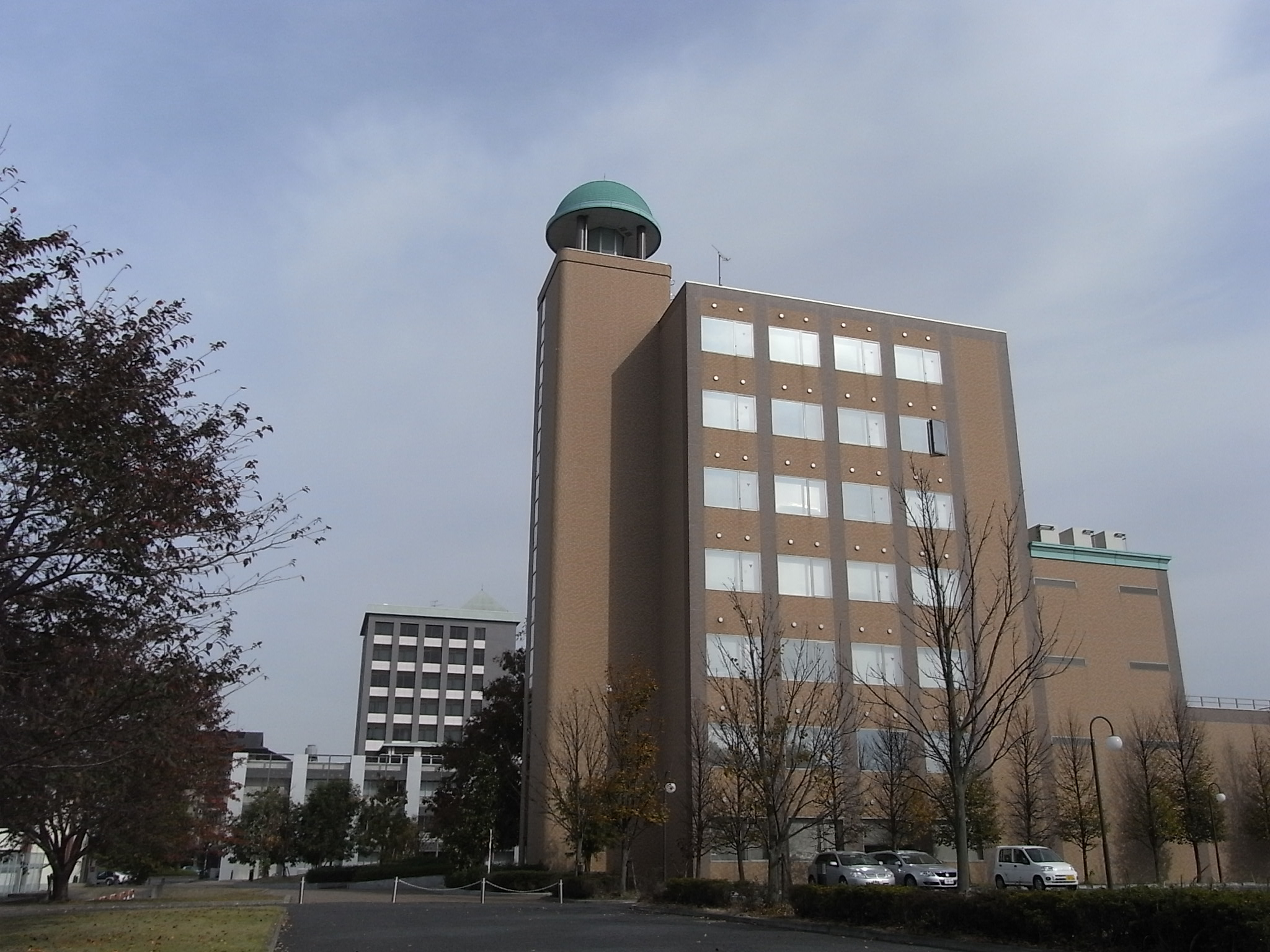
- Type: Private
- Established: 1903, university from 1976
- Location: Fukaya, Saitama, Japan
- Website: www.sit.ac.jp

Saitama Institute of Technology (埼玉工業大学, Saitama kōgyo daigaku) is a private university in Fukaya, Saitama, Japan, established in 1976. The predecessor of the school was founded in 1903.
