= Ōsato District =

District in Saitama Prefecture, Japan

Coordinates: 36.1201°N 139.194°E

Ōsato (大里郡, Ōsato-gun) is a district located in eastern Saitama Prefecture, Japan.

As of 2003, the district has an estimated population of 130,305 and a population density of 629.34 persons per km^{2}. The total area is 207.05 km^{2}.

== Towns ==
- Yorii

== Mergers ==
- On October 1, 2005, the towns of Ōsato and Menuma merged into the city of Kumagaya.
- On January 1, 2006, the towns of Hanazono, Kawamoto and Okabe merged into the city of Fukaya.
- On February 13, 2007, the town of Kōnan merged into the city of Kumagaya.
