= Ōsato, Saitama =

Dissolved municipality in Saitama prefecture, Japan

Coordinates: 36°06′N 139°25′E

Ōsato (大里町, Ōsato-machi)

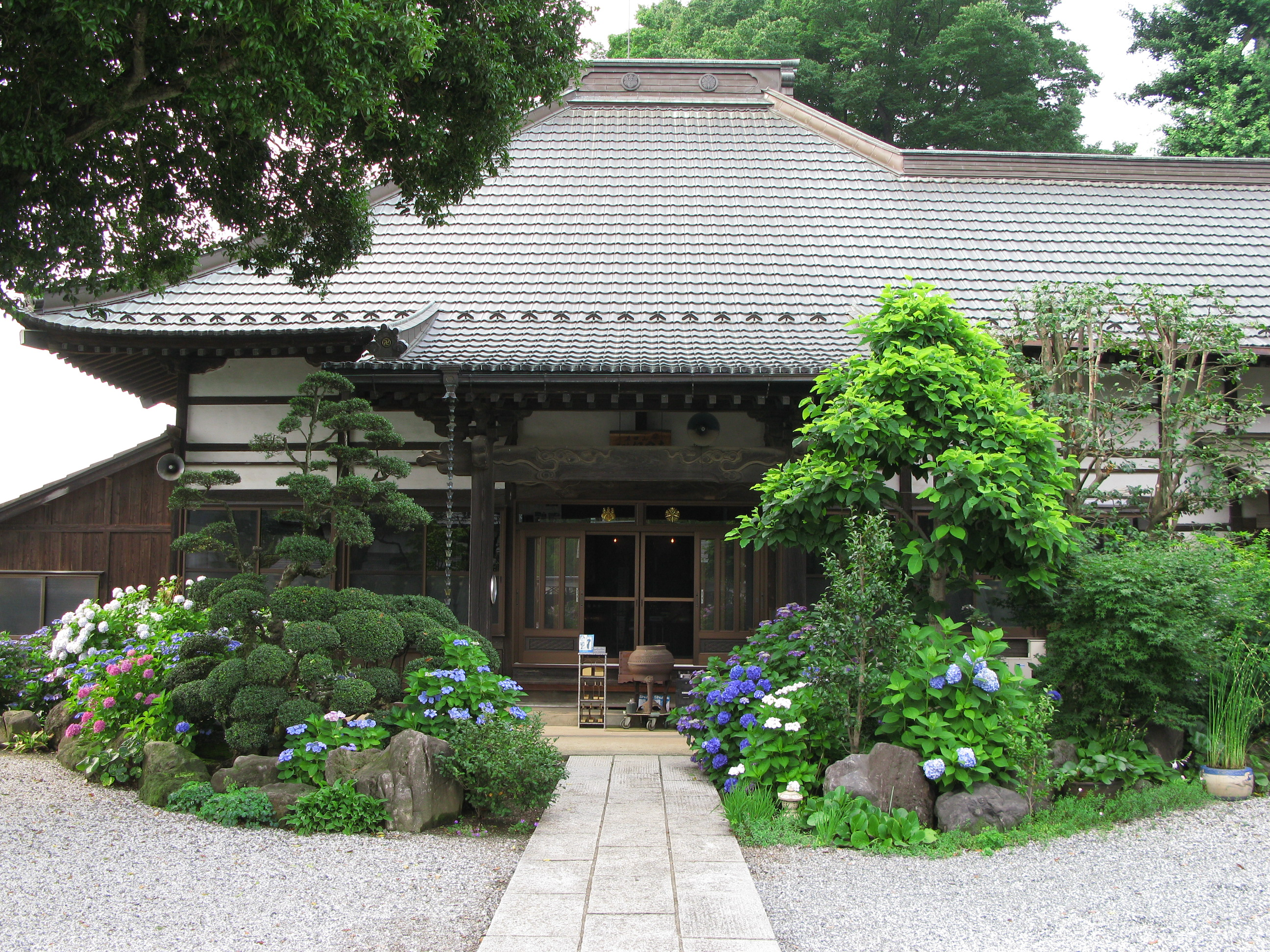
Bonji Main Hall (Kumagaya City, Saitama Prefecture)

was a town located in Ōsato District, Saitama Prefecture, Japan.

As of 2003, the town had an estimated population of 8,325 and a density of 534.34 persons per km^{2}. The total area was 15.58 km^{2}.

On October 1, 2005, Ōsato, along with the town of Menuma (also from Ōsato District), was merged into the expanded city of Kumagaya and no longer exists as an independent municipality.
