= Matsuhisa Station =

Railway station in Misato, Saitama Prefecture, Japan

Matsuhisa Station 松久駅
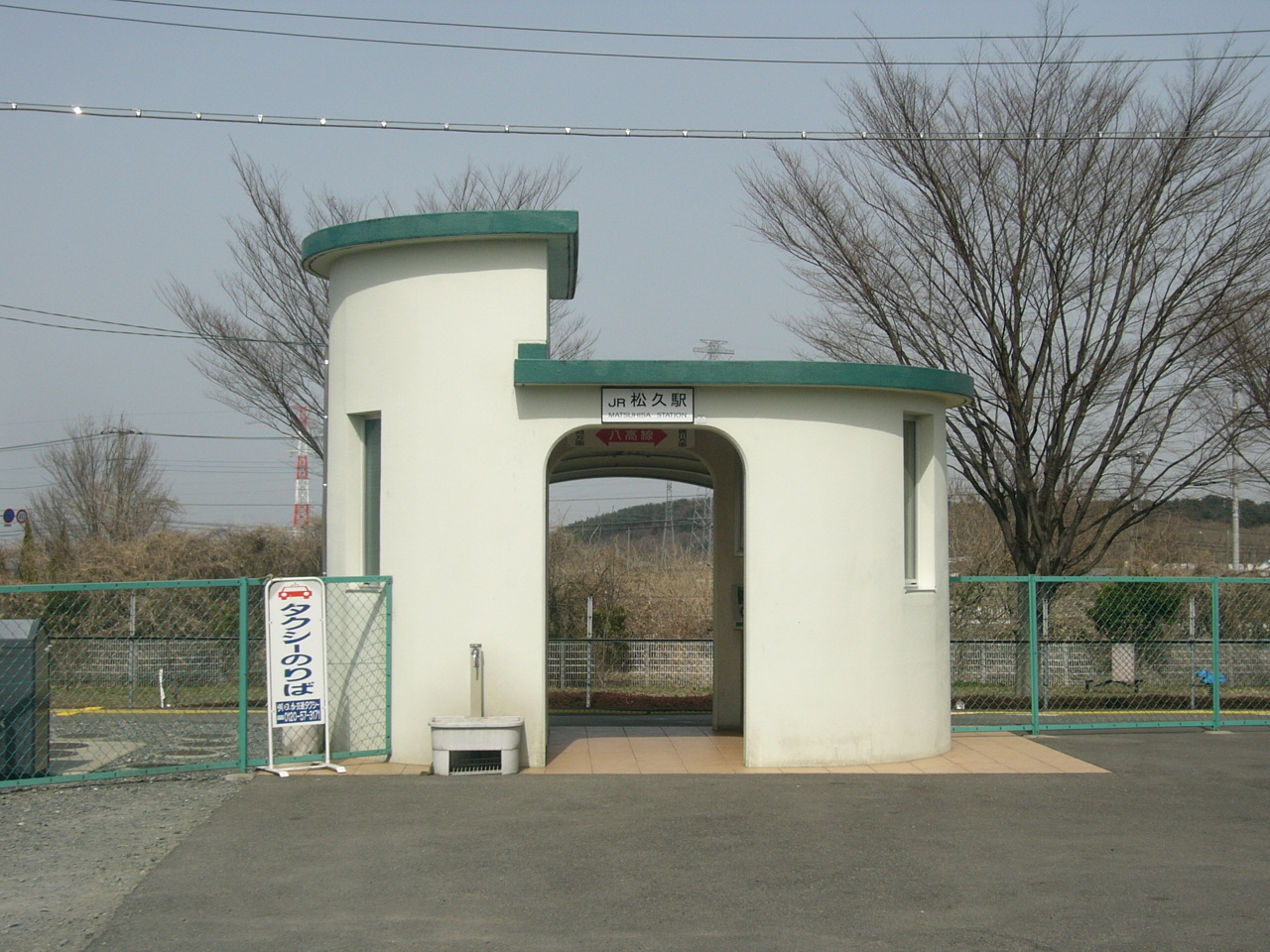
- The station building in April 2006

General information
- Location: Amagasu, Misato-machi, Kodama-gun, Saitama-ken 367–0113; Japan
- Coordinates: 36.1731°N 139.1823°E
- Operator: JR East
- Line: ■ Hachiko Line
- Distance: 71.1 km from Hachiōji
- Platforms: 1 side platform
- Tracks: 1

Other information
- Status: Unstaffed
- Website: Official website

History
- Opened: 25 January 1933

Passengers
- FY2010: 119 daily

Services
Preceding station	JR East	Following station
Kodama towards Takasaki	Hachikō Line	Yōdo towards Komagawa
Location
- Location within Saitama Prefecture Location within Japan

Matsuhisa Station (松久駅, Matsuhisa-eki) is a passenger railway station located in the town of Misato, Saitama, Japan, operated by the East Japan Railway Company (JR East).

== Lines ==
Matsuhisa Station is served by the Hachiko Line between Komagawa and Takasaki, and is located 71.1 kilometers from the official starting point of the line at Hachiōji

== Station layout ==
The station is unstaffed and consists of one side platform serving a single track. The station is unattended.

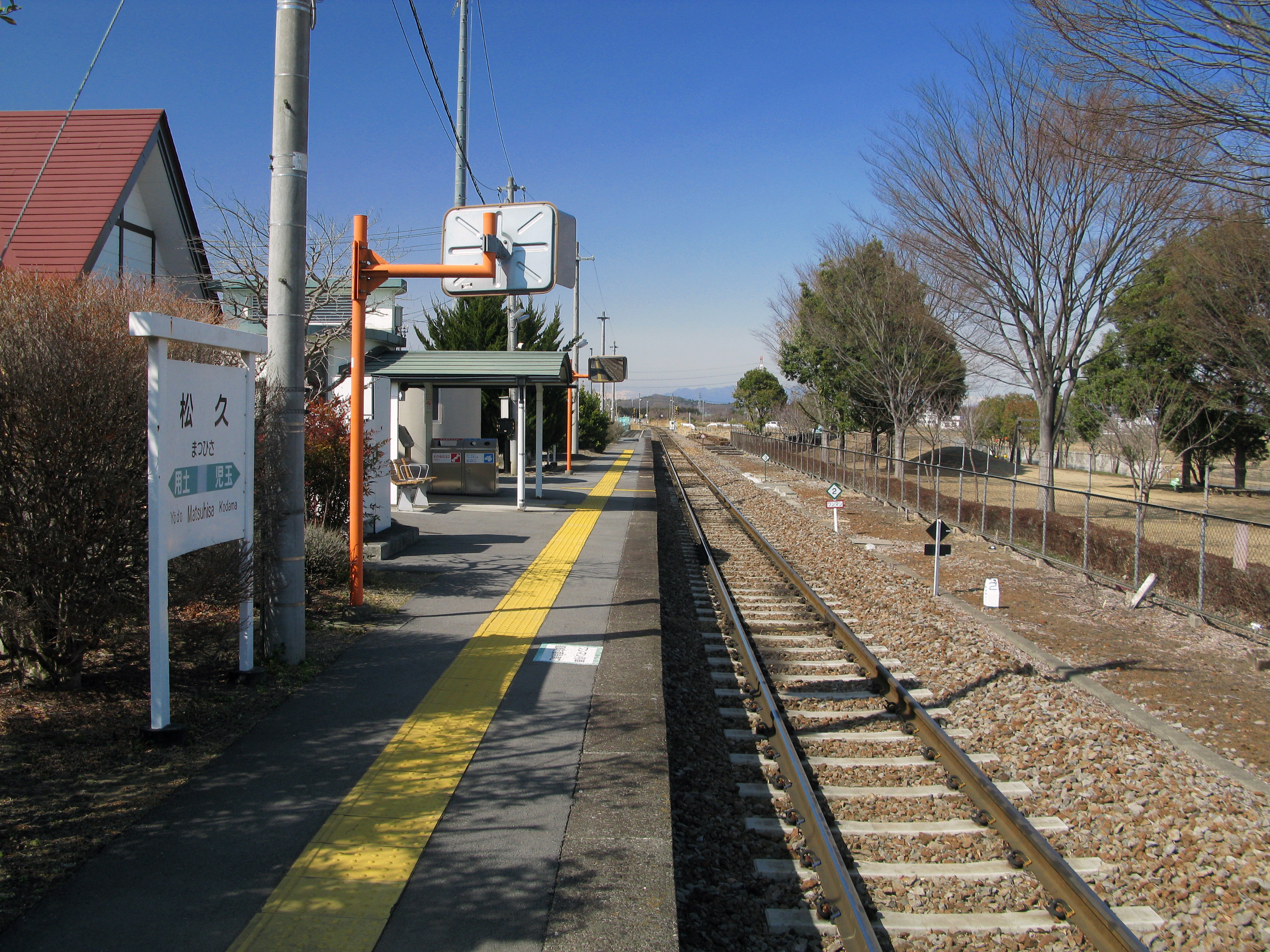
The platform in February 2013

== History ==
The station opened on 25 January 1933. With the privatization of Japanese National Railways (JNR) on 1 April 1987, the station came under the control of JR East.

== Passenger statistics ==
In fiscal 2010, the station was used by an average of 119 passengers daily (boarding passengers only).

== Surrounding area ==
- Misato Town Hall
- Misato Post Office
- Misato Junior High School
- Matsuhisa Junior High School

== See also ==
- List of railway stations in Japan
