= Myōkaku Station =

Railway station in Tokigawa, Saitama Prefecture, Japan

Myōkaku Station 明覚駅
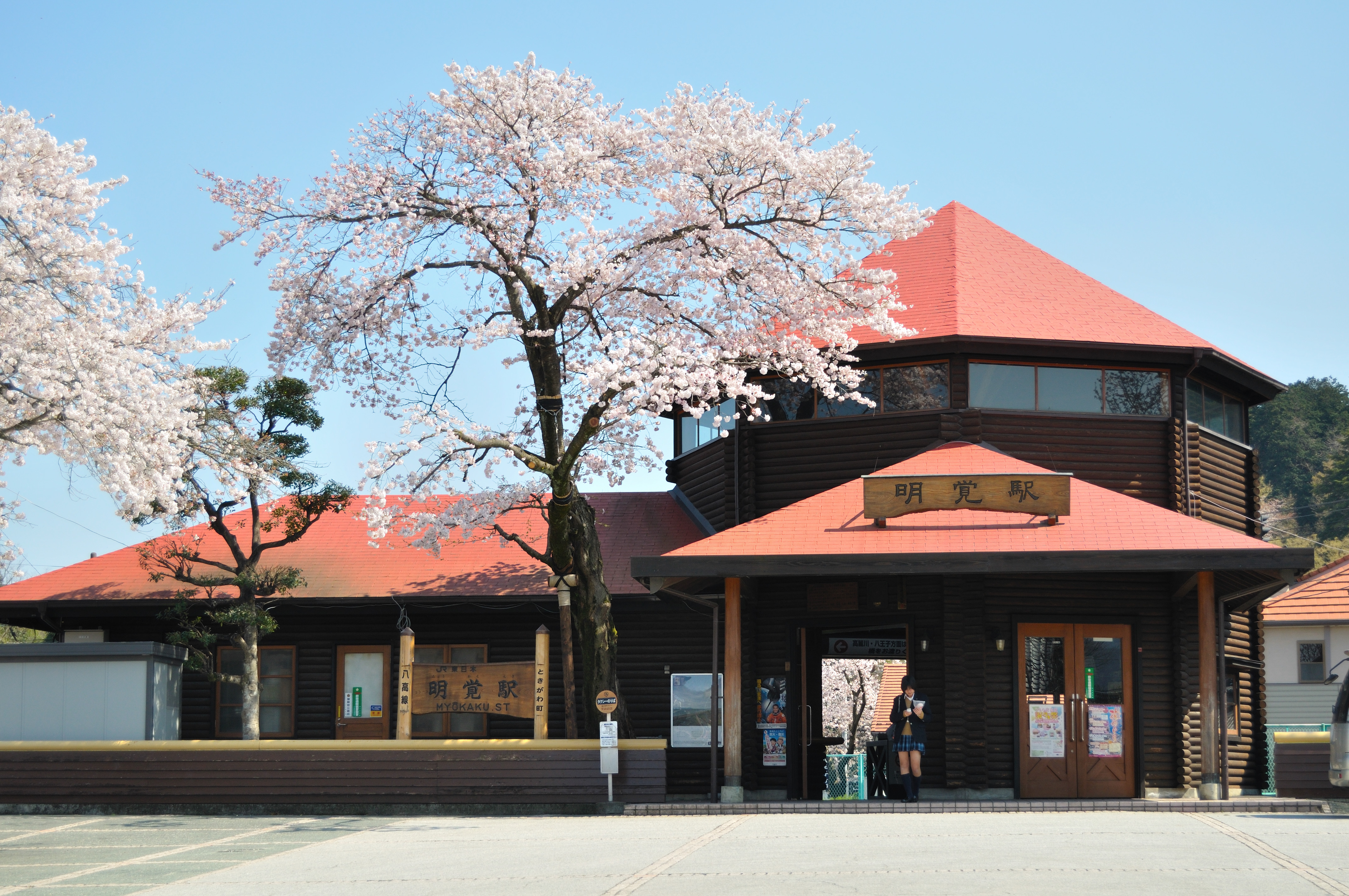
- The station entrance in April 2010

General information
- Location: 475–2 Banjō, Tokigawa-machi, Hiki-gun, Saitama-ken 355–0354; Japan
- Coordinates: 36.0033°N 139.2886°E
- Operator: JR East
- Line: ■ Hachikō Line
- Distance: 44.8 km from Hachiōji
- Platforms: 2 side platforms
- Tracks: 2

Other information
- Status: Unstaffed
- Website: Official website

History
- Opened: 24 March 1934
- Rebuilt: 1988

Passengers
- FY2010: 454 daily

Services
Preceding station	JR East	Following station
Ogawamachi towards Takasaki	Hachikō Line	Ogose towards Komagawa
Location
- Location within Saitama Prefecture Location within Japan

Myōkaku Station (明覚駅, Myōkaku-eki) is a passenger railway station in the town of Tokigawa, Saitama, Japan, operated by East Japan Railway Company (JR East).

== Lines ==
Myōkaku Station is served by the Hachikō Line between Komagawa and Takasaki. It is located 44.8 kilometers from the official starting point of the line at Hachiōji.

== Station layout ==
The station consists of two opposed side platforms serving two tracks, which form a passing loop on the single-track line. The platforms are connected by a level crossing. The station is unattended.

=== Platforms ===
1	■ Hachikō Line	for Ogose and Komagawa
2	■ Hachikō Line	for Ogawamachi, Yorii, and Takasaki

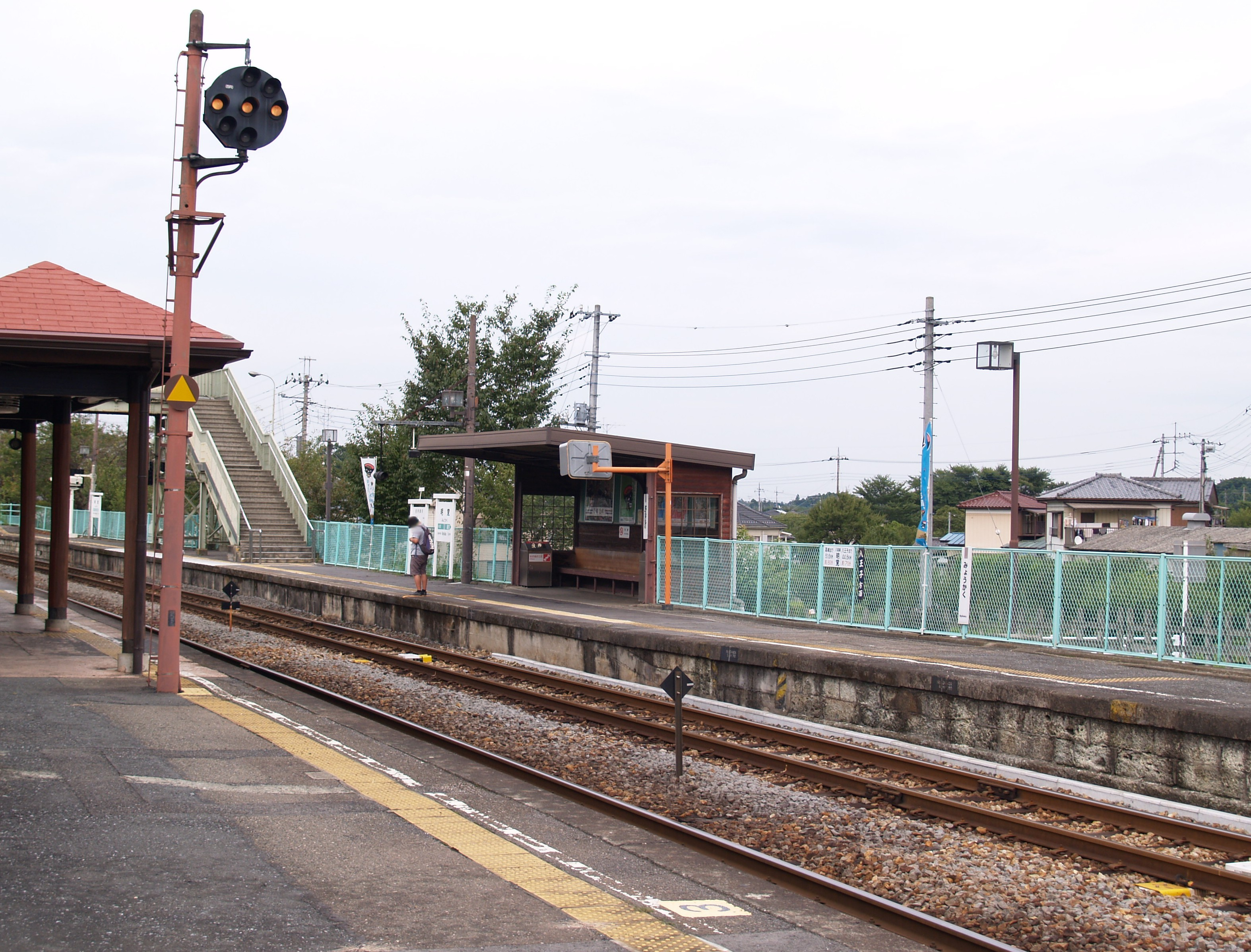
The platforms in September 2010

== History ==
The station opened on 24 March 1934. The station building was destroyed in a fire on 8 November 1988, and a new building was completed on 18 September 1989.

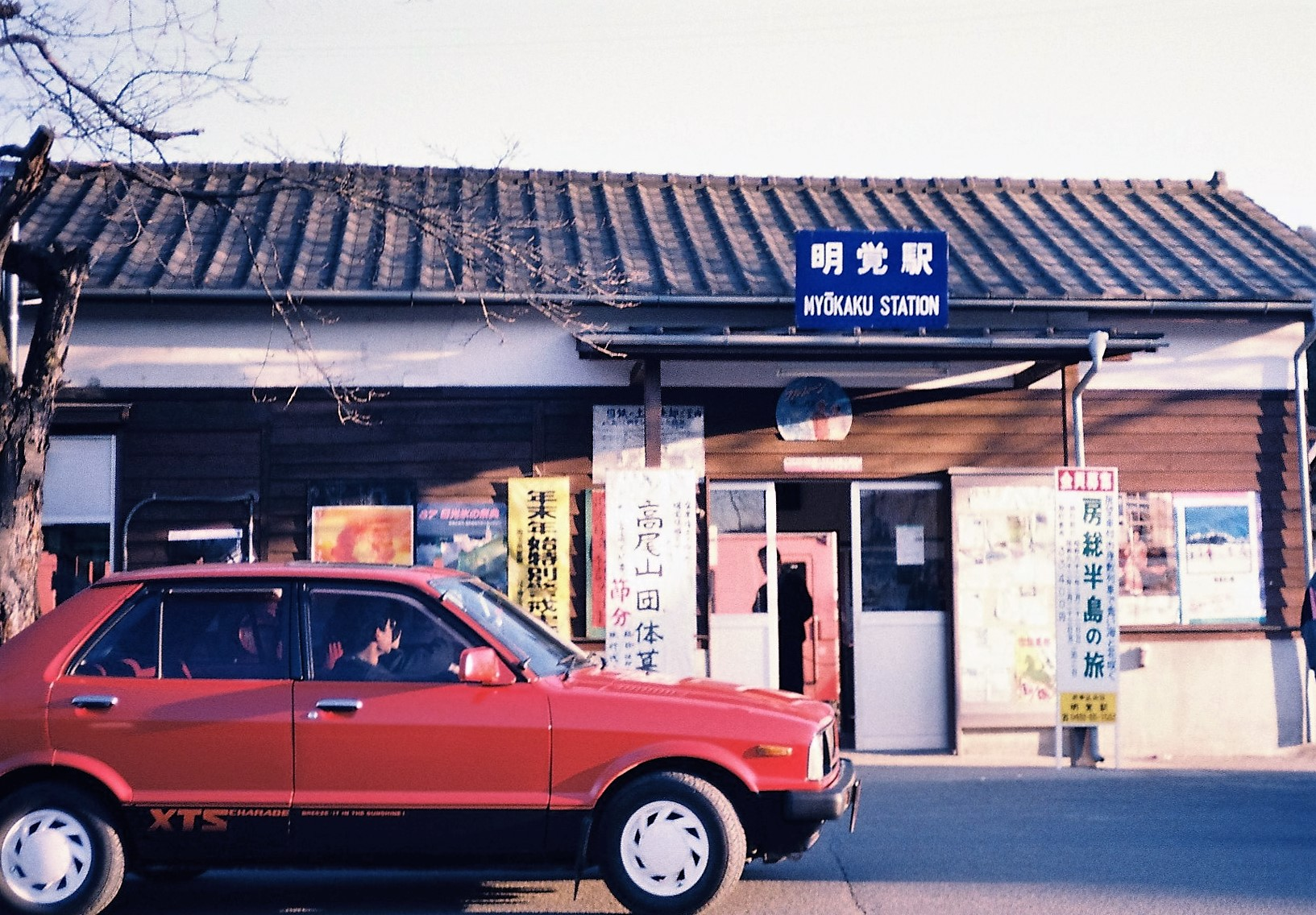
The station in January 1987

== Passenger statistics ==
In fiscal 2010, the station was used by an average of 454 passengers daily (boarding passengers only).

== Surrounding area ==
- Tamagawa Post Office
- Former Tamagawa Village Hall

== See also ==
- List of railway stations in Japan
