= Orihara Station =

Railway station in Yorii, Saitama Prefecture, Japan

Orihara Station 折原駅
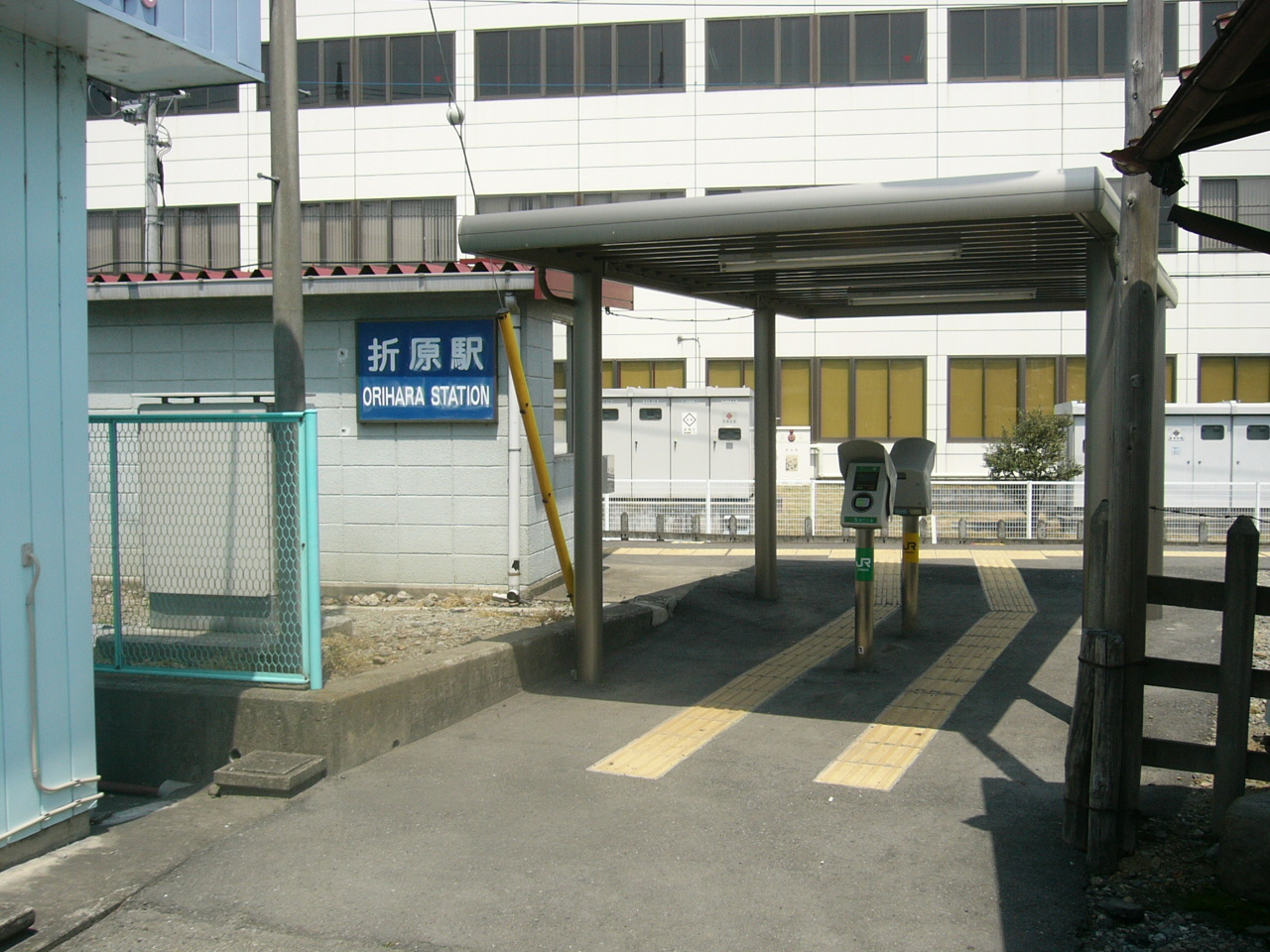
- Orihara Station entrance in May 2006

General information
- Location: Nishinoiri, Yorii-machi, Ōsato-gun, Saitama-ken 369-1225; Japan
- Coordinates: 36.0962°N 139.1952°E
- Operator: JR East
- Line: ■ Hachikō Line
- Distance: 60.3 km from Hachiōji
- Platforms: 1 side platform
- Tracks: 1

Other information
- Status: Unstaffed
- Website: Official website

History
- Opened: 6 October 1934

Passengers
- FY2010: 40 daily

Services
Preceding station	JR East	Following station
Yorii towards Takasaki	Hachikō Line	Takezawa towards Komagawa
Location
- Location within Saitama Prefecture Location within Japan

Orihara Station (折原駅, Orihara-eki) is a passenger railway station in the town of Yorii, Saitama, Japan, operated by East Japan Railway Company (JR East).

== Lines ==
Orihara Station is served by the Hachikō Line between Komagawa and Takasaki. It is located 60.3 kilometers from the official starting point of the line at Hachiōji.

== Station layout ==
The station consists of one side platform serving a single track. The station is unattended.

== History ==
The station opened on 6 October 1934.

== Passenger statistics ==
In fiscal 2010, the station was used by an average of 40 passengers daily (boarding passengers only).

== Surrounding area ==
- Orihara Elementary School
- Jonan Junior High School
- Tokyo Lion Yorii plant

== See also ==
- List of railway stations in Japan
