= Tanshō Station =

Railway station in Kamikawa, Saitama Prefecture, Japan

Tanshō Station 丹荘駅
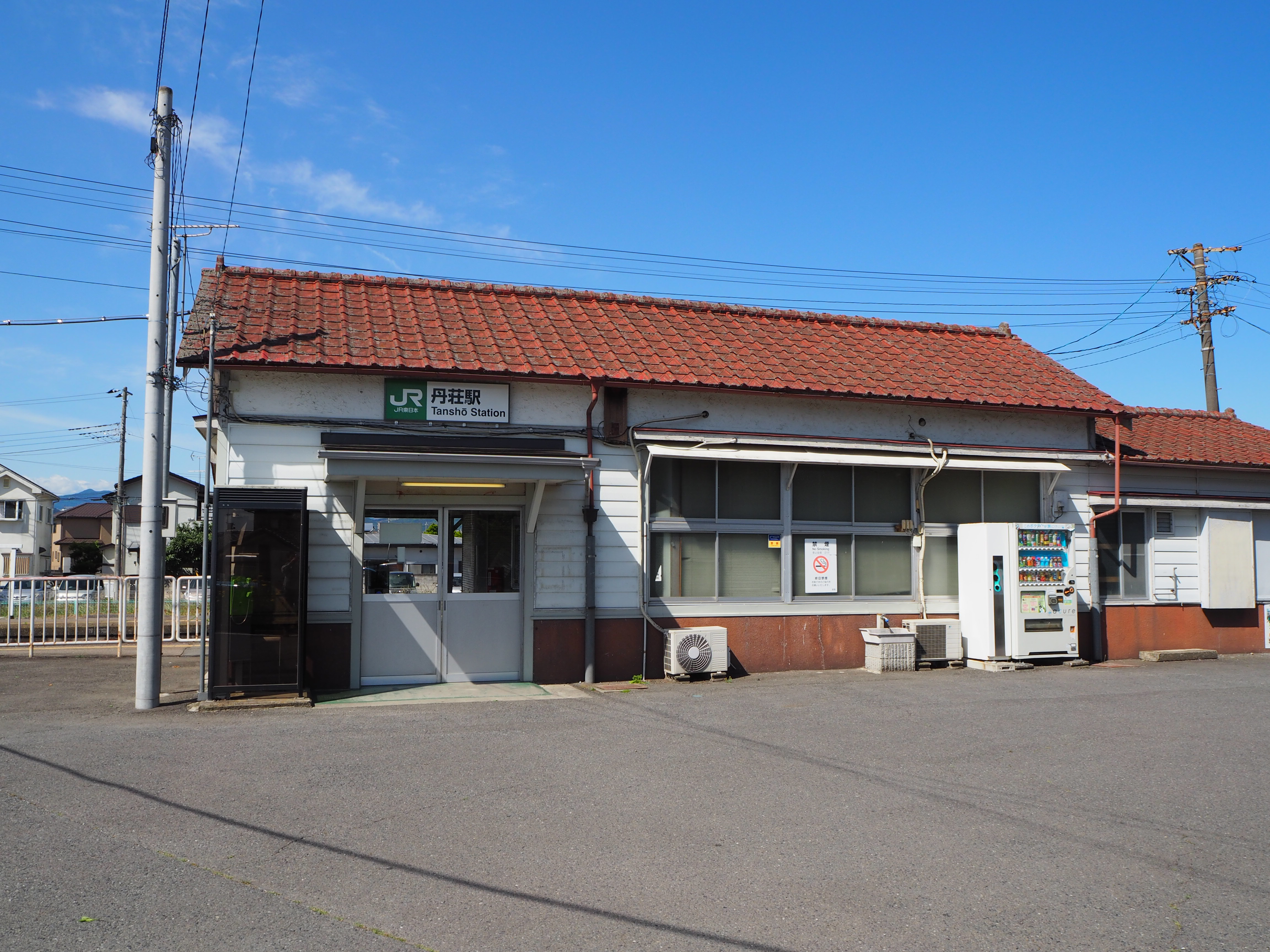
- Tanshō Station in 2017

General information
- Location: Uedake, Kamikawa-cho, Kodama-gun, Saitama-ken 367-0245; Japan
- Coordinates: 36.2165°N 139.1021°E
- Operator: JR East
- Line: ■ Hachikō Line
- Distance: 80.0 km from Hachiōji
- Platforms: 1 side platform
- Tracks: 1

Other information
- Status: Unstaffed
- Website: Official website

History
- Opened: 1 July 1931

Passengers
- FY2010: 269 daily

Services
Preceding station	JR East	Following station
Gunma-Fujioka towards Takasaki	Hachikō Line	Kodama towards Komagawa
Location
- Location within Saitama Prefecture Location within Japan

Tanshō Station (丹荘駅, Tanshō-eki) is a passenger railway station located in the town of Kamikawa, Saitama, Japan, operated by East Japan Railway Company (JR East).

== Lines ==
Tanshō Station is served by the Hachikō Line between Komagawa and Takasaki, and is located 80.0 kilometers from the official starting point of the line at Hachiōji.

== Station layout ==
The station consists of one side platform serving a bi-directional track. The station is unattended.

The station originally consisted of two side platforms serving two tracks, which formed a passing loop on the single-track line. Platform two was connected to the station building by a footbridge. In October 2015, however, the station was converted to single-track as a result of the removal of the railroad switches and tracks that connected platform 2 in which the trains no longer passing each other. The footbridge which connects platform 2 and its track remains, but was permanately closed and therefore passengers no longer have access to these facilities.

== History ==
The station opened on 1 July 1931.

== Passenger statistics ==
In fiscal 2010, the station was used by an average of 269 passengers daily (boarding passengers only).

== Surrounding area ==
- Kamikawa Town Hall
- Tanshō Post Office

== See also ==
- List of railway stations in Japan
