= HB-E220 series =

Japanese hybrid diesel multiple unit train type

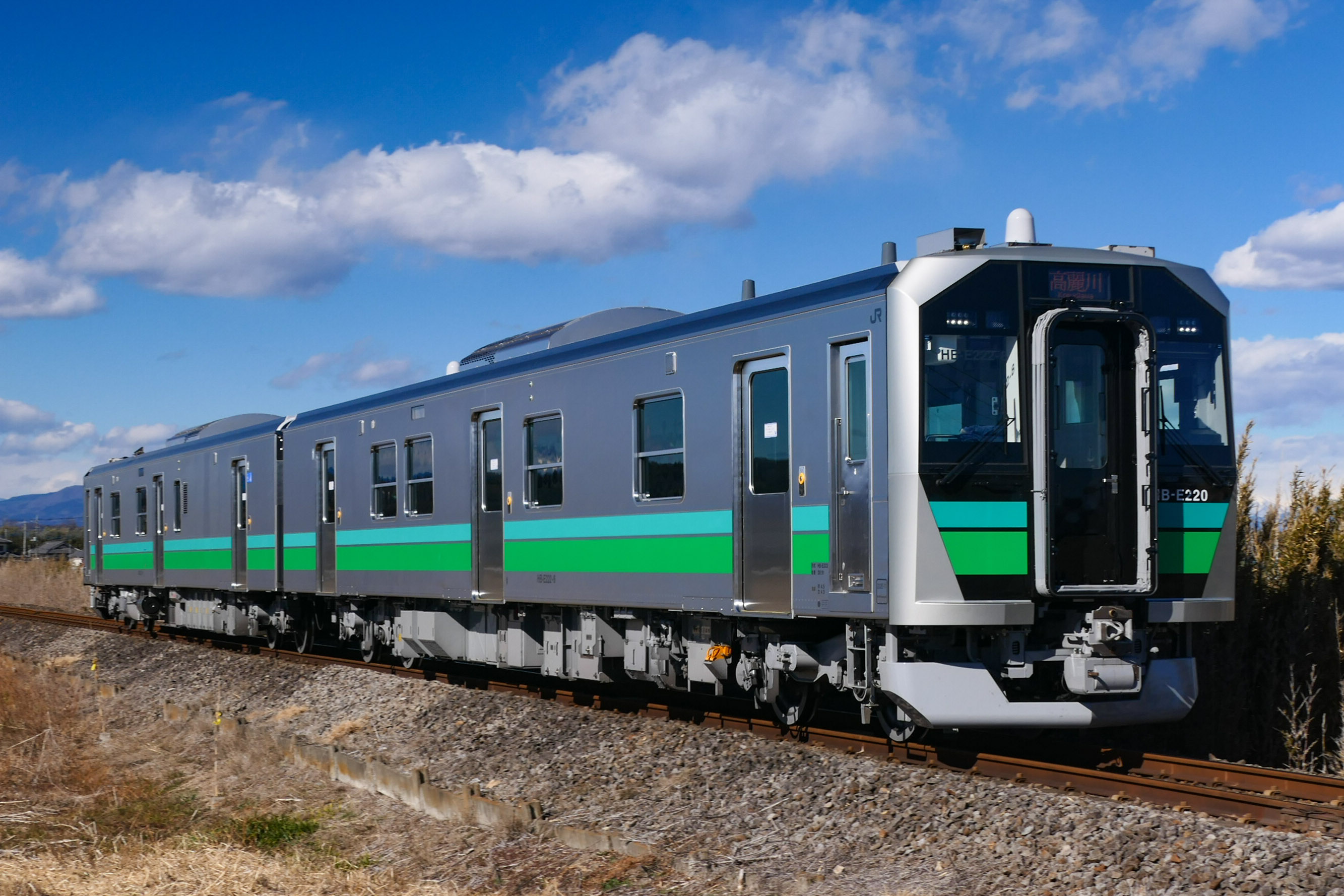
- HB-E220 series 2-car set in January 2026
- In service: 2025–present
- Manufacturer: Kawasaki Railcar Mfg.
- Replaced: KiHa 100 series, KiHa 110 series
- Entered service: 1 December 2025
- Number under construction: 27 vehicles; 12 × 2-car; 3 x 1-car
- Number built: 5 vehicles; 2 × 2-car; 1 x 1-car
- Formation: 1/2 cars per unit
- Capacity: 243 (2-car unit); 103 (Single-car unit)
- Operator: JR East
- Lines served: ■ Hachikō Line; ■ Tōhoku Main Line; ■ Kamaishi Line

Specifications
- Car body construction: Stainless steel
- Car length: 20,600 mm (67 ft 7 in)
- Width: 2,800 mm (9 ft 2 in)
- Height: 3,640 mm (11 ft 11 in)
- Doors: 3 per side
- Maximum speed: 100 km/h (62 mph)

Notes/references
- Specifications

The HB-E220 series (Japanese: HB-E220系) is a hybrid diesel multiple unit (DMU) train type operated by East Japan Railway Company (JR East) on services in the Takasaki and Morioka areas of Japan. 32 vehicles are to be built to replace ageing KiHa 100 series and KiHa 110 series DMUs.

== Design ==
The HB-E220 series adopts a traction system similar to that of the diesel–electric GV-E400 series, but the HB-E220 series also features onboard batteries. The diesel engine and batteries can operate alone or together to provide power to the train's main converter, which controls its traction motors. When braking, the traction motors act as generators, recharging the batteries.

Cars are of stainless steel construction with three doors per side.

== Operations ==
The HB-E220 series fleet is scheduled to be used on the following lines:

- Hachikō Line (Komagawa – Takasaki)
- Tōhoku Main Line (Morioka – Hanamaki)
- Kamaishi Line (Hanamaki – Kamaishi)

== Formations ==
The HB-E220 series fleet will consist of fourteen two-car units and four single-car units. Eight two-car units will be allocated to Hachikō Line services while the other six two-car units and all four single-car units will operate on the Tōhoku Main Line and Kamaishi Line. They are formed as follows.

=== Single-car units ===
Numbering	HB-E220
Capacity	103

=== 2-car units ===
Numbering	HB-E221	HB-E222
Capacity	117	126

- The HB-E221 car has a Western-style toilet.

== Interior ==
Passenger accommodation consists of longitudinal seating throughout.

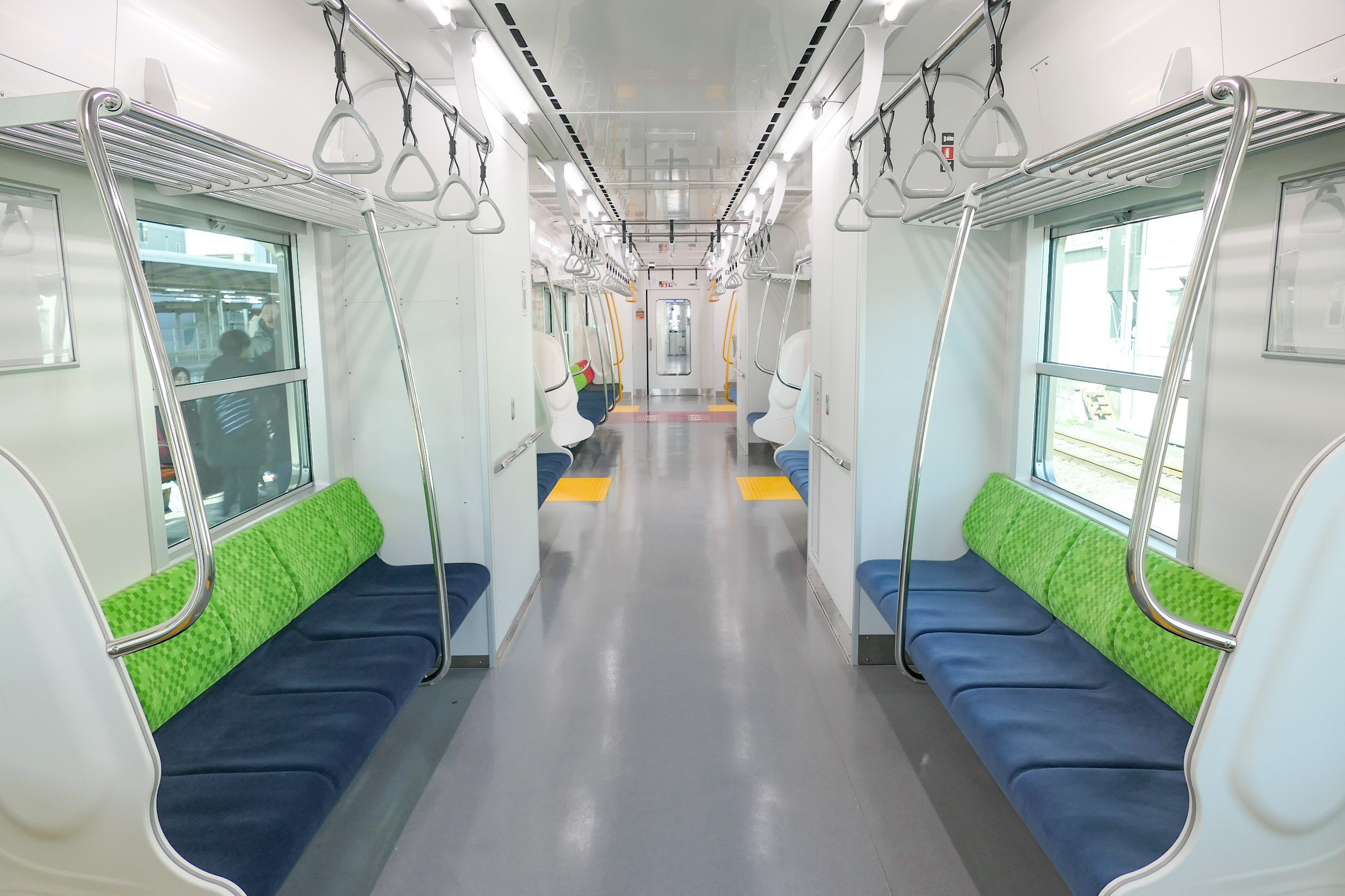
Interior

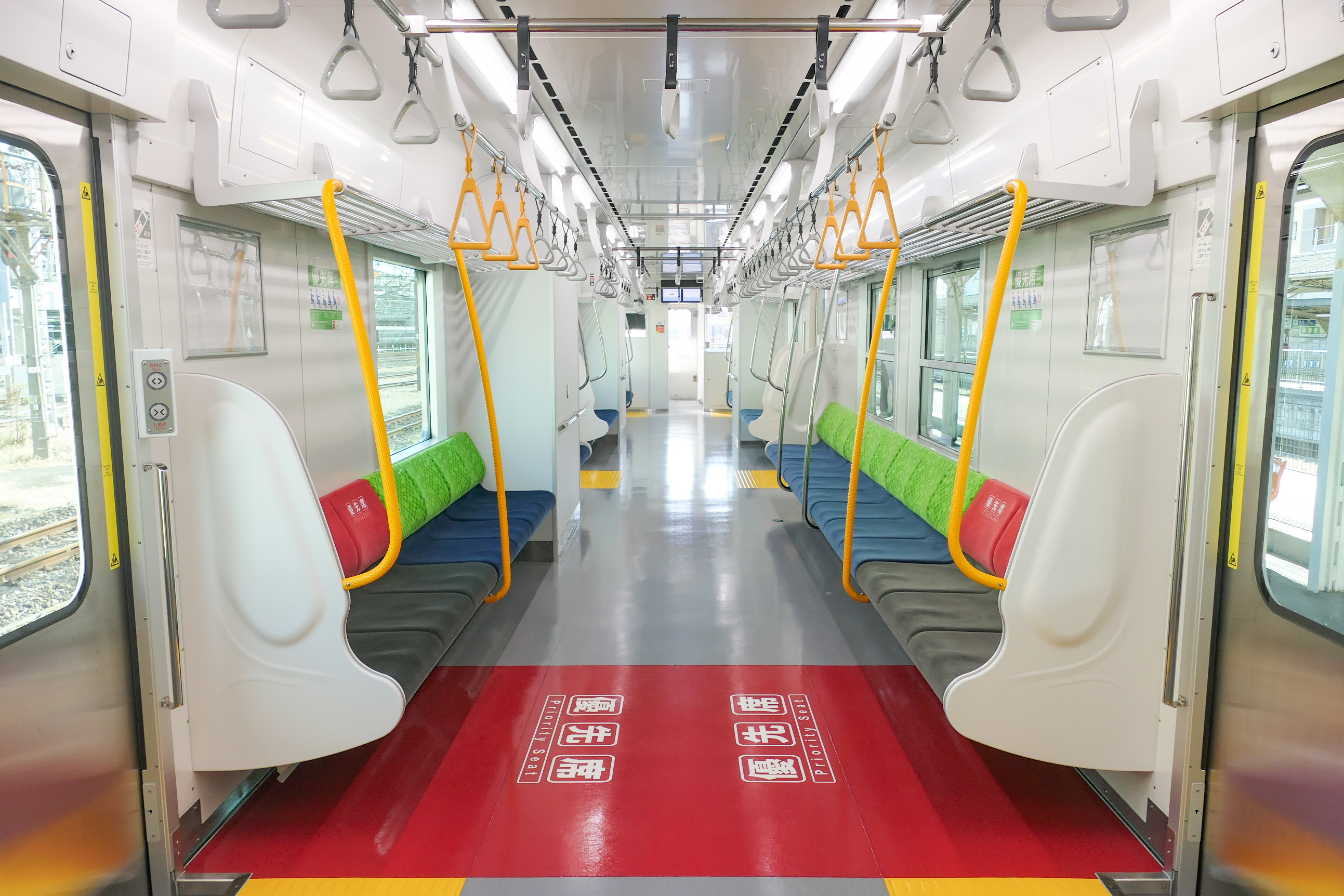
Interior with priority seating marked with red seatback and flooring

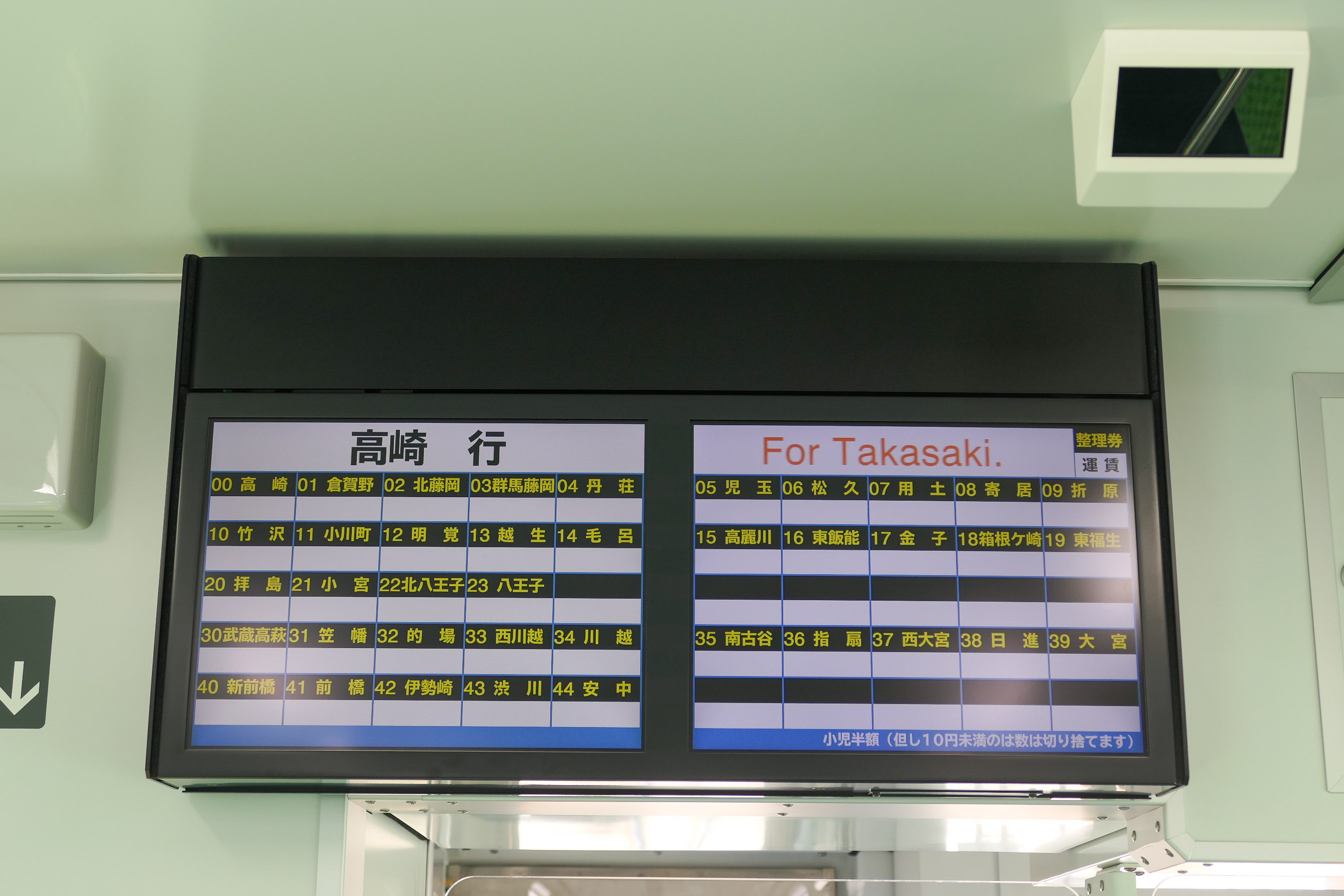
Fare display

== History ==
Details of the new trains on order were first announced by JR East on 21 November 2024.

The first three HB-E220 series cars, single-car unit HB-E220-1 and two-car set HB-E221-1 + HB-E222-1, were delivered from the Kawasaki Railcar Manufacturing plant from April 2025.

The first two-car set to be built for use on Hachikō Line services, HB-E221-7 + HB-E222-7, was delivered in July 2025. On 22 August 2025, JR East announced plans to replace the entire non-electrified Hachikō Line fleet of KiHa 110 series sets with the HB-E220 series by the end of fiscal 2025. In November, JR East later announced that the HB-E220 series would enter revenue service on the Kamaishi Line from 19 January 2026.

The fleet entered service on the Hachikō Line on 1 December 2025.
