= Hachikō Line derailment =

1947 railway accident in Japan

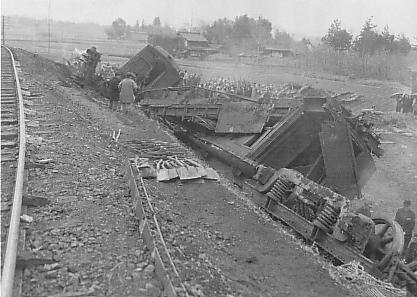

Details
- Date: 25 February 1947
- Location: Saitama Prefecture
- Country: Japan
- Line: Hachikō Line
- Operator: Japanese Government Railways
- Incident type: Derailment
- Cause: Excessive speed

Statistics
- Trains: 1
- Deaths: 184
- Injured: 495

The Hachikō Line derailment (八高線列車脱線転覆事故, Hachikō-sen ressha dassen tenpuku jiko) was a major fatal railway accident which occurred on 25 February 1947 between Komagawa and Higashi-Hannō stations on the Hachikō Line in Japan. It is the worst railway accident to have occurred in Japan.

A Japanese Government Railways (JGR) passenger train hauled by a Class C57 steam locomotive travelling in the "down" direction derailed on a sharp curve, and four cars rolled over into a field. 184 passengers were killed and 495 were injured. It was later determined that the derailment had occurred due to a combination of excessive speed, and that the high casualty rate was due to the overcrowded wooden passenger cars, which were already worn out by overuse during the war.

JGR used the opportunity to obtain permission from the Supreme Commander of the Allied Powers to replace all wooden passenger cars (approximately 3,000 were in use at the time) with steel-bodied cars within a few years.

== See also ==
- Lists of rail accidents
