= Higashi-Fussa Station =

Railway station in Fussa, Tokyo, Japan

Higashi-Fussa Station 東福生駅
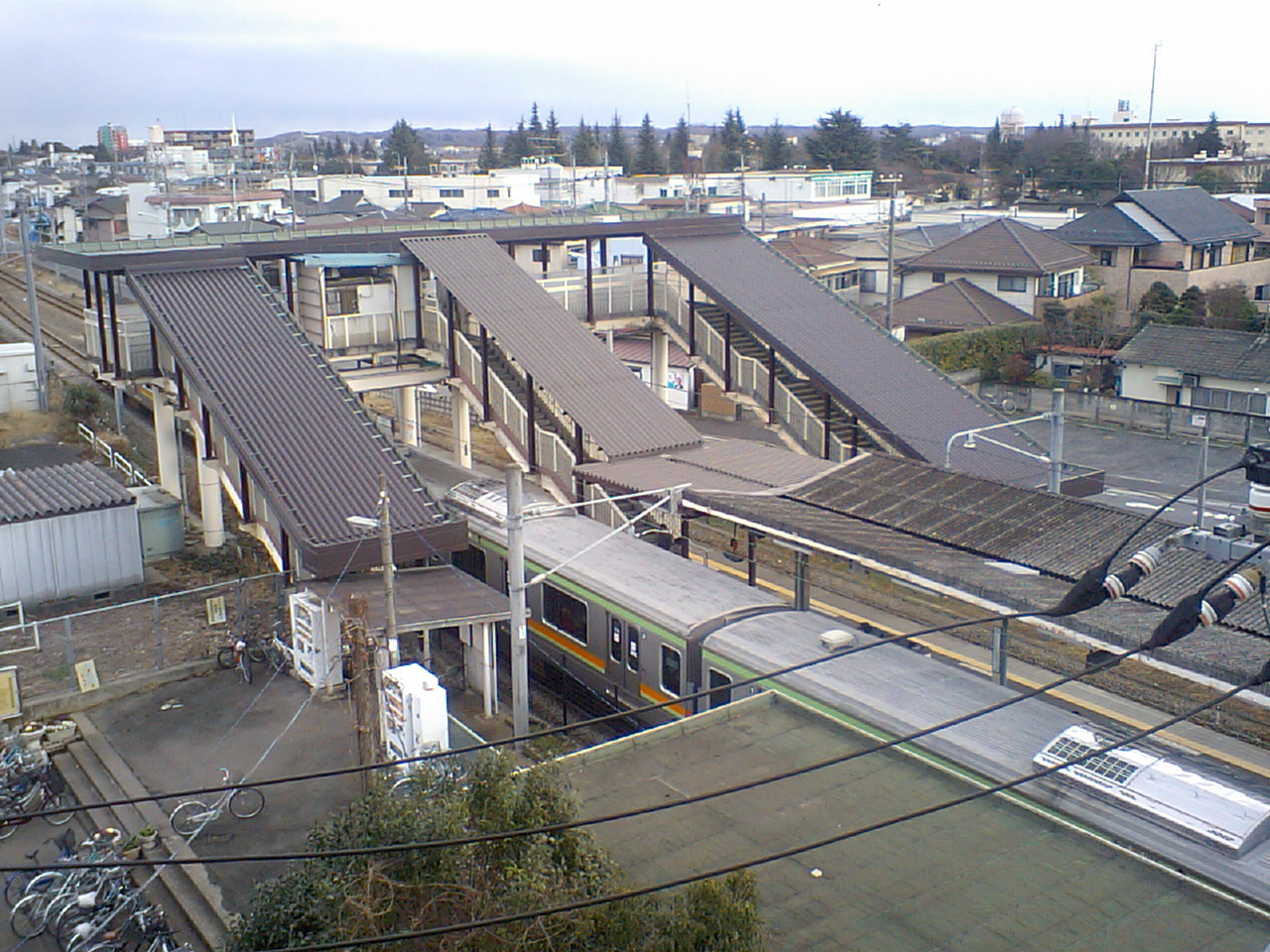
- Overview of Higashi-Fussa Station, January 2009

General information
- Location: 1-1-7 Musashinodai, Fussa-shi, Tokyo 197-0011; Japan
- Coordinates: 35°44′44.37″N 139°20′8.92″E
- Operator: JR East
- Line: ■ Hachikō Line
- Distance: 12.7 from Hachiōji
- Platforms: 1 island platform

Other information
- Status: Unstaffed
- Website: Official website

History
- Opened: 1 December 1931

Passengers
- FY2010: 1422

Services
Preceding station	JR East	Following station
Hakonegasaki towards Komagawa	Hachikō Line	Haijima towards Hachiōji
Location
- Location within Tokyo Location within Japan

Higashi-Fussa Station (東福生駅, Higashi Fussa-eki) is a passenger railway station located in the city of Fussa, Tokyo, Japan, operated by East Japan Railway Company (JR East). Higashi means east in Japanese, and Higashi-Fussa Station is located east of central Fussa.

== Lines ==
Higashi-Fussa Station is served by the Hachikō Line between Hachiōji and Komagawa, with many services continuing to and from Kawagoe on the Kawagoe Line.

== Station layout ==
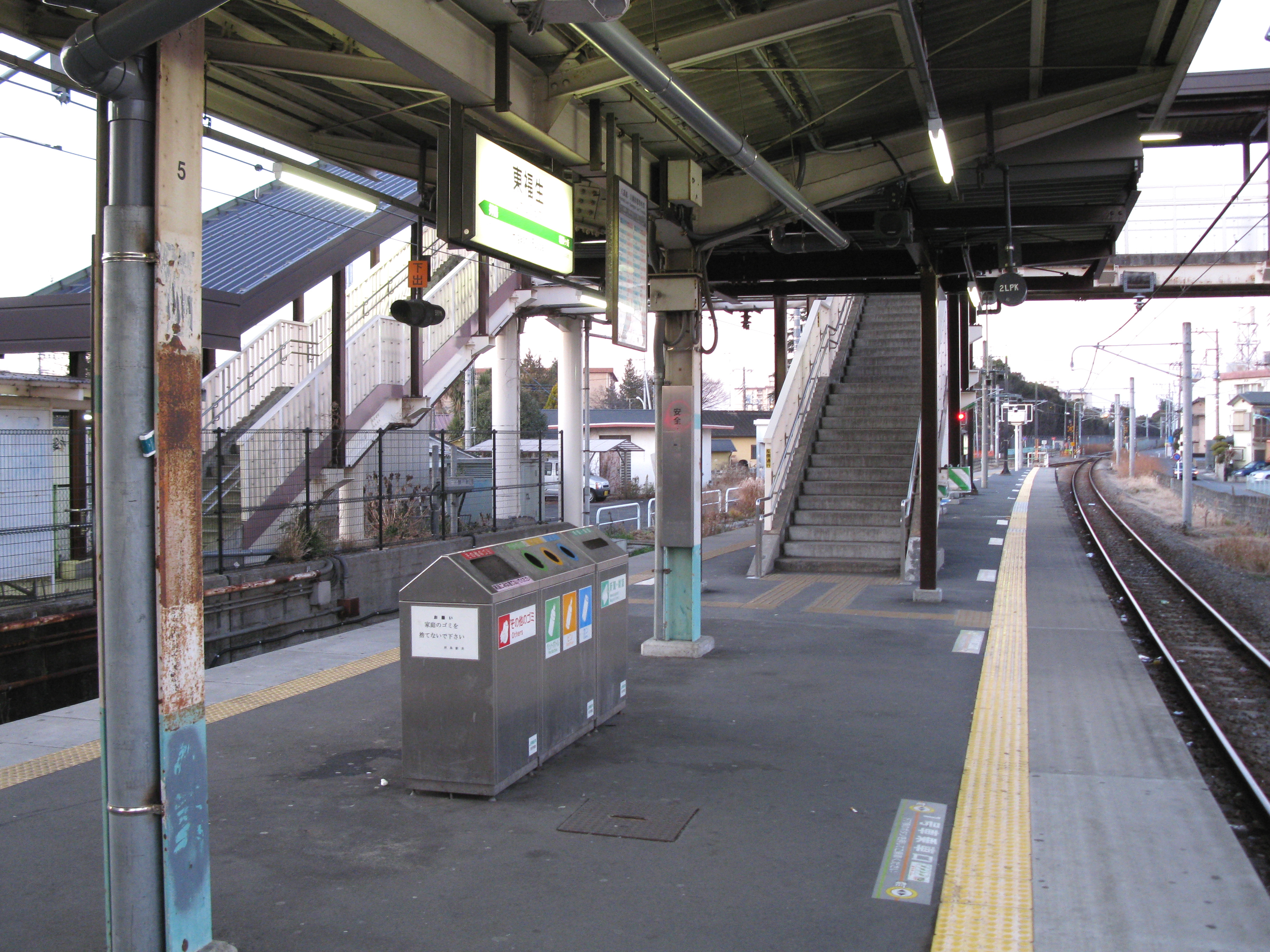
View of the platforms, January 2009

The station is normally unstaffed, and consists of an island platform serving two tracks, forming a passing loop on the single-track line.

=== Platforms ===
1	■ Hachikō Line	for Hakonegasaki, Komagawa, and Kawagoe
2	■ Hachikō Line	for Haijima and Hachiōji

== History ==
The station opened on 10 December 1931. With the privatization of Japanese National Railways (JNR) on 1 April 1987, the station came under the control of JR East. The southern section of the Hachikō Line between Hachiōji and Komagawa was electrified on 16 March 1996, with through services commencing between Hachiōji and Kawagoe.

== Passenger statistics ==
In fiscal 2010, the station was used by an average of 1,422 passengers daily (boarding passengers only).

== Surrounding area ==
- Yokota Air Base
- Dependent house
- National Route 16
- Marufuja
- Fussa Public Hospital

== See also ==
- List of railway stations in Japan
