= Komiya Station =

Railway station in Hachiōji, Tokyo, Japan

Coordinates: 35.6858°N 139.3686°E

Komiya Station 小宮駅
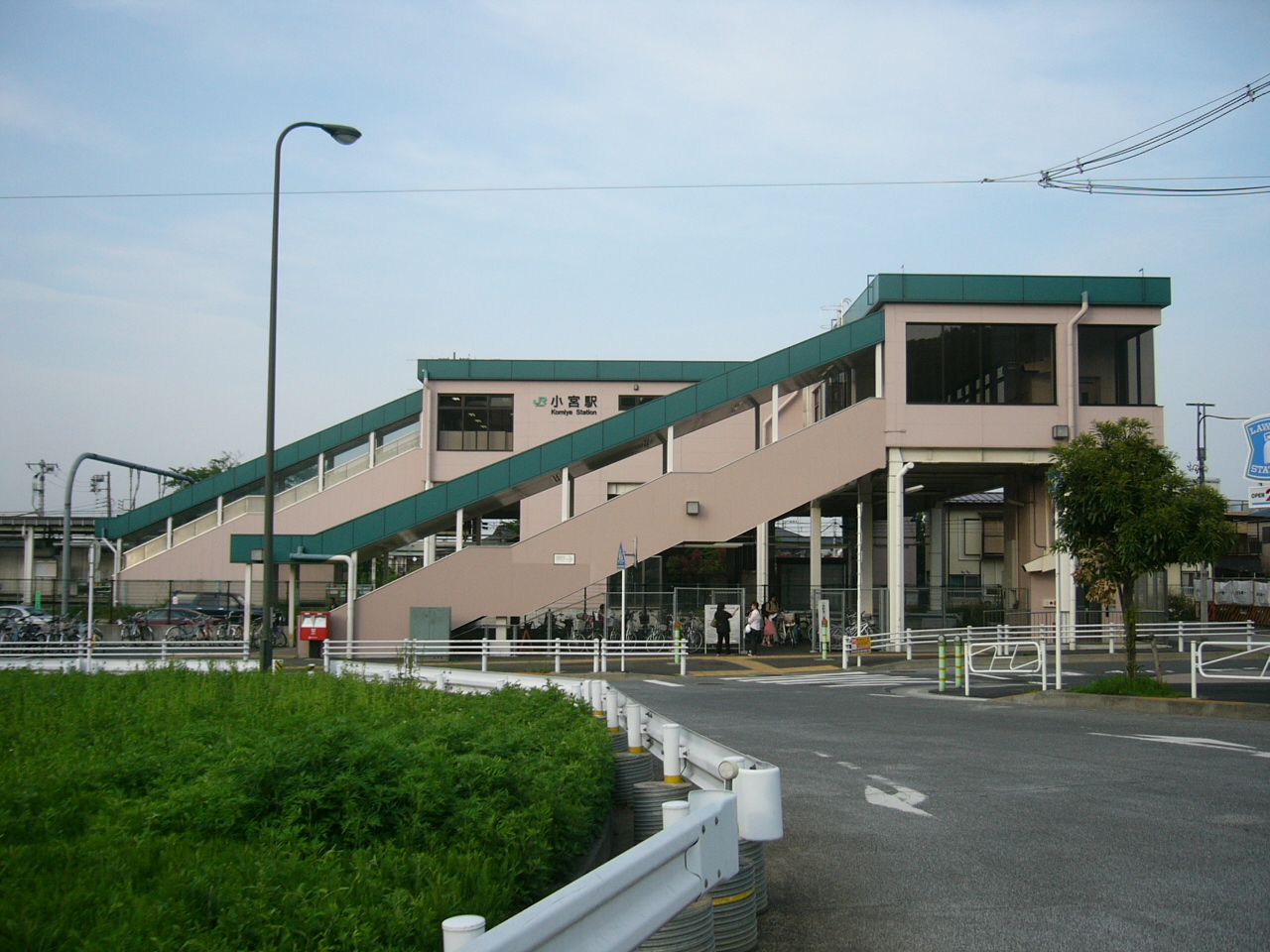
- South side of Komiya Station in May 2006

General information
- Location: 789 Komiya-machi, Hachiōji-shi, Tokyo 192-0031; Japan
- Operator: JR East
- Line: ■ Hachiko Line
- Distance: 5.1 km from Hachiōji
- Platforms: 2 side platforms
- Tracks: 2

Other information
- Status: Staffed
- Website: Official website

History
- Opened: 10 December 1931
- Electrified: 16 March 1996

Passengers
- FY2019: 3,055 daily

Services
| Preceding station | JR East | Following station |
|---|---|---|
| Haijima towards Komagawa | Hachikō Line | Kita-Hachiōji towards Hachiōji |
Location
- Location within Tokyo Location within Japan

Komiya Station (小宮駅, Komiya-eki) is a passenger railway station located in the city of Hachiōji, Tokyo, Japan, operated by East Japan Railway Company (JR East).

== Lines ==
Komiya Station is served by the Hachiko Line between Hachiōji and Komagawa, with many services continuing to and from Kawagoe on the Kawagoe Line. The station is 5.1 kilometers from the official starting point of the line at Hachiōji Station.

== Station layout ==
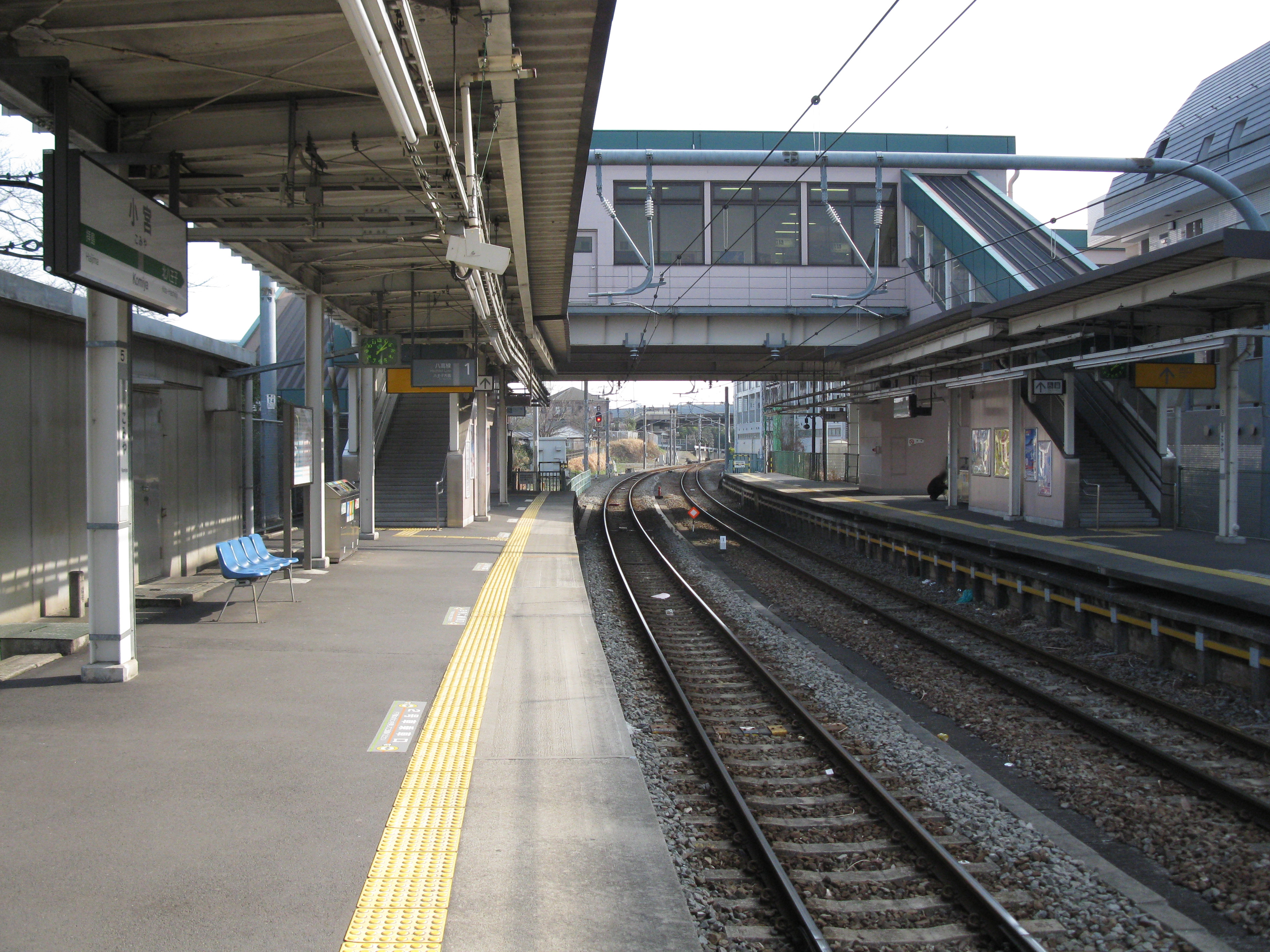
View of the platforms in February 2009

The station consists of two ground-level opposed side platforms serving two tracks, connected by a footbridge. The station is attended.

=== Platforms ===
| 1 | ■ Hachiko Line | for Hachiōji |
| 2 | ■ Hachiko Line | for Haijima, Komagawa, and Kawagoe |

== History ==
The station opened on 10 December 1931. With the privatization of Japanese National Railways (JNR) on 1 April 1987, the station came under the control of JR East.

The southern section of the Hachiko Line between Hachiōji and Komagawa was electrified on 16 March 1996, with through services commencing between Hachiōji and Kawagoe.

== Passenger statistics ==
In fiscal 2019, the station was used by an average of 3,055 passengers daily (boarding passengers only).

The passenger figures (boarding passengers only) for previous years are as shown below.

| Fiscal year | daily average |
|---|---|
| 2005 | 2,098 |
| 2010 | 2,696 |
| 2015 | 3,180 |

== Surrounding area ==
- Hachioji City Komiya Elementary School
- Hachioji City Ishikawa Junior High School
- Hachioji City Hall Ishikawa Office

== See also ==
- List of railway stations in Japan
