= Kodama Station =

Railway station in Honjō, Saitama Prefecture, Japan

Kodama Station 児玉駅
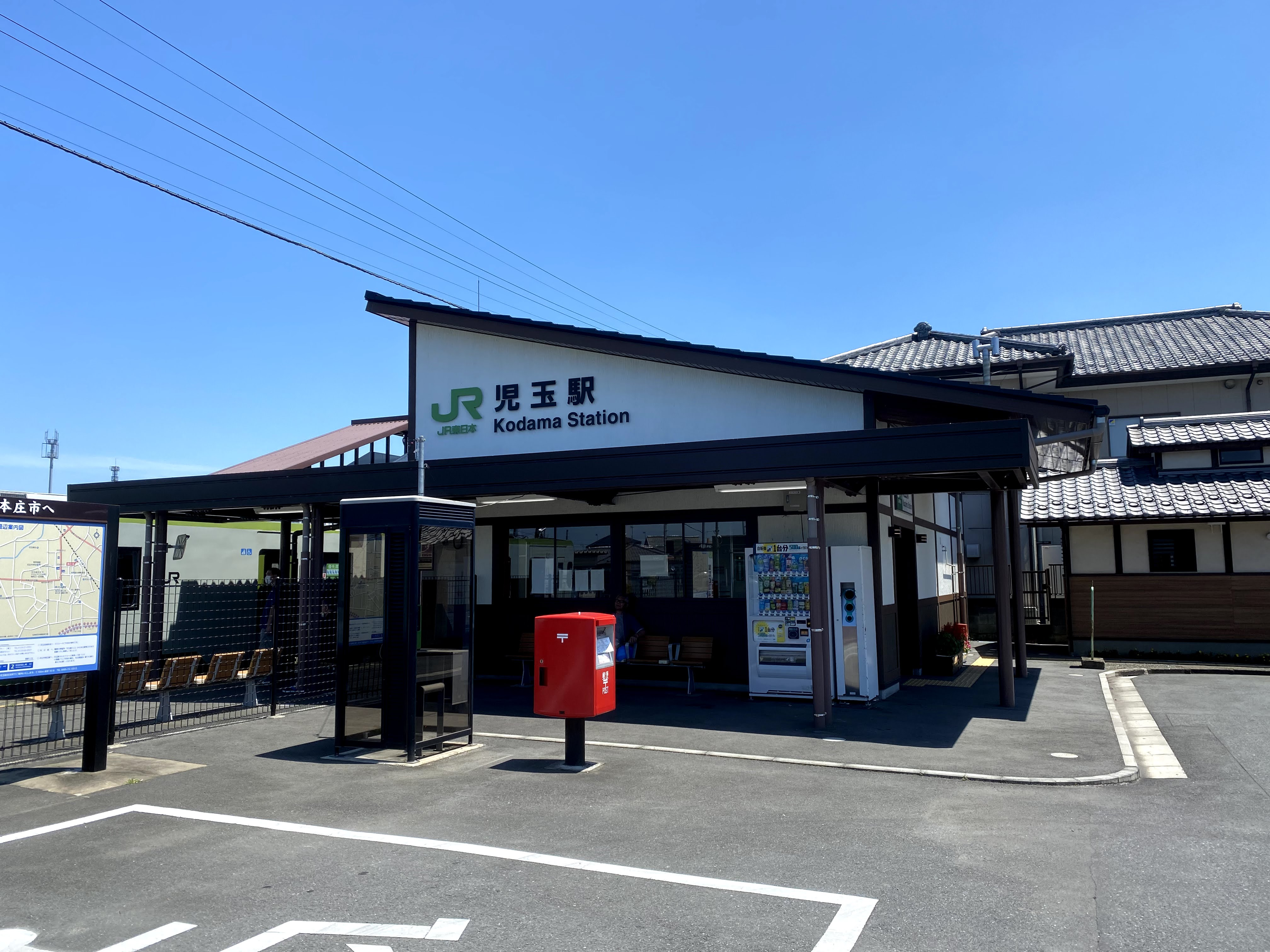
- Kodama Station, July 2021

General information
- Location: 2482 Kodama, Kodama-chō, Honjō-shi, Saitama-ken 367-0212; Japan
- Coordinates: 36.1924°N 139.1359°E
- Operator: JR East
- Line: ■ Hachikō Line
- Distance: 75.9 km from Hachiōji
- Platforms: 2 side platforms
- Tracks: 2

Other information
- Status: Unstaffed
- Website: Official website

History
- Opened: 1 July 1931
- Rebuilt: 2015

Passengers
- FY2019: 356 (daily, boarding only)

Services
Preceding station	JR East	Following station
Tanshō towards Takasaki	Hachikō Line	Matsuhisa towards Komagawa
Location
- Location within Saitama Prefecture Location within Japan

Kodama Station (児玉駅, Kodama-eki) is a passenger railway station located in the city of Honjō, Saitama, Japan, operated by East Japan Railway Company (JR East).

== Lines ==
Kodama Station is served by the Hachikō Line between Komagawa and Takasaki and is located 75.9 kilometers from Hachiōji.

== Station layout ==
The station consists of two side platforms serving two tracks, which form a passing loop on the single-track line. The platforms are connected to the station building by a footbridge. The station has been unstaffed since March 2021.

=== Platforms ===
1	■ Hachikō Line	for Gunma-Fujioka and Takasaki
2	■ Hachikō Line	for Yorii, Ogawamachi, and Komagawa

== History ==
The station opened on 1 July 1931. A new station building was completed in December 2015..

== Passenger statistics ==
In fiscal 2019, the station was used by an average of 356 passengers daily (boarding passengers only).

== Surrounding area ==
- Saitama Prefectural Kodama High School
- Kodama Post Office
- Former Kodama Town Hall

== See also ==
- List of railway stations in Japan
