= Yōdo Station =

Railway station in Yorii, Saitama Prefecture, Japan

Yōdo Station 用土駅
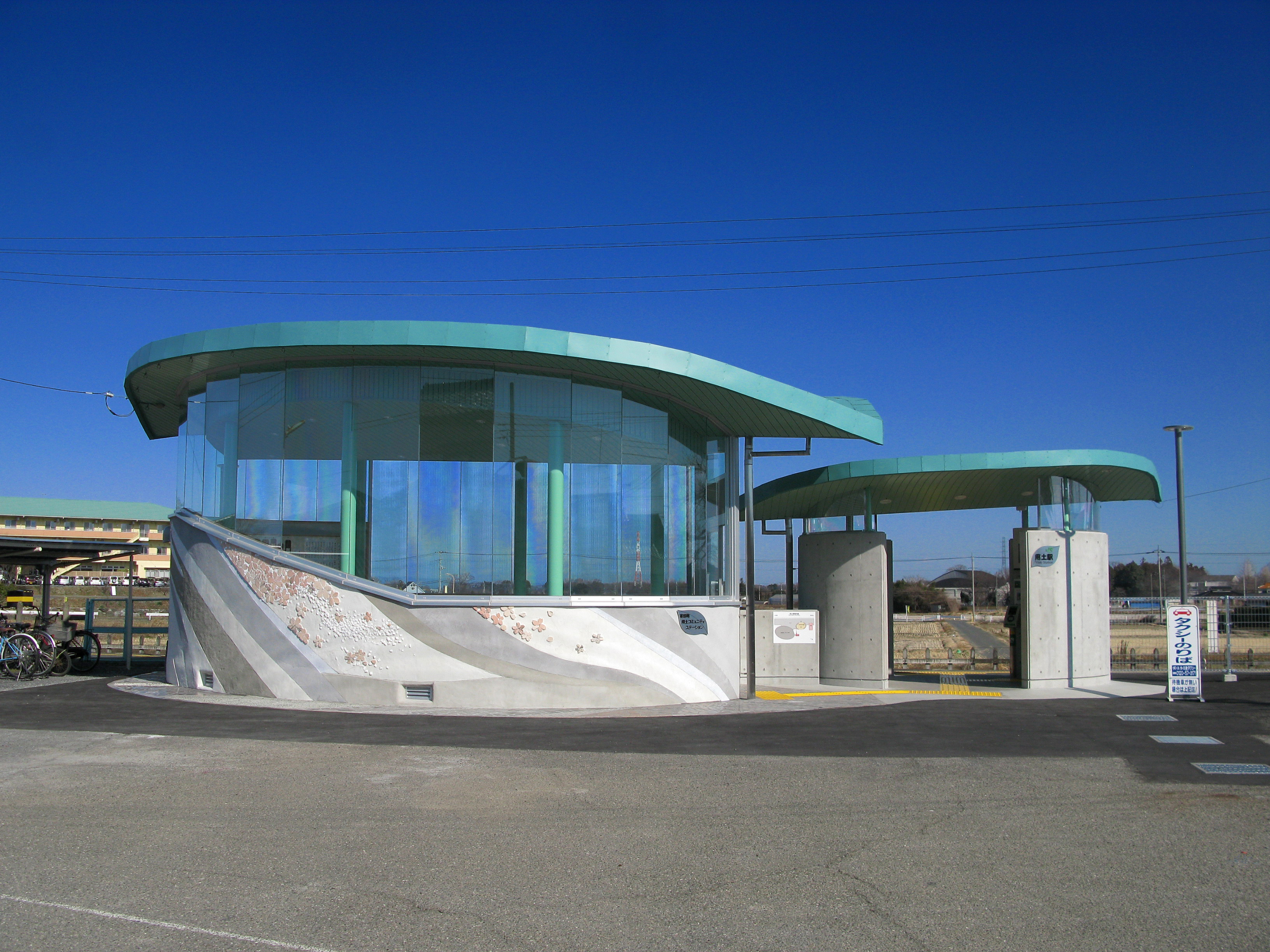
- Yōdo Station in January 2013

General information
- Location: Yōdo, Yorii-machi, Ōsato-gun, Saitama-ken 369-1201; Japan
- Coordinates: 36.1539°N 139.2006°E
- Operator: JR East
- Line: ■ Hachikō Line
- Distance: 68.4 km from Hachiōji
- Platforms: 1 side platform
- Tracks: 1

Other information
- Status: Unstaffed
- Website: Official website

History
- Opened: 25 January 1933
- Rebuilt: 2012

Passengers
- FY2010: 89 (daily)

Services
Preceding station	JR East	Following station
Matsuhisa towards Takasaki	Hachikō Line	Yorii towards Komagawa
Location
- Location within Saitama Prefecture Location within Japan

Yōdo Station (用土駅, Yōdo-eki) is a passenger railway station in the town of Yorii, Saitama, Japan, operated by East Japan Railway Company (JR East).

== Lines ==
Yōdo Station is served by the Hachikō Line between Komagawa and Takasaki, and is located 68.4 kilometers from the official starting point of the line at Hachiōji.

== Station layout ==
The station is unstaffed and consists of one side platform serving a single bidirectional track. The station is unattended.

== History ==
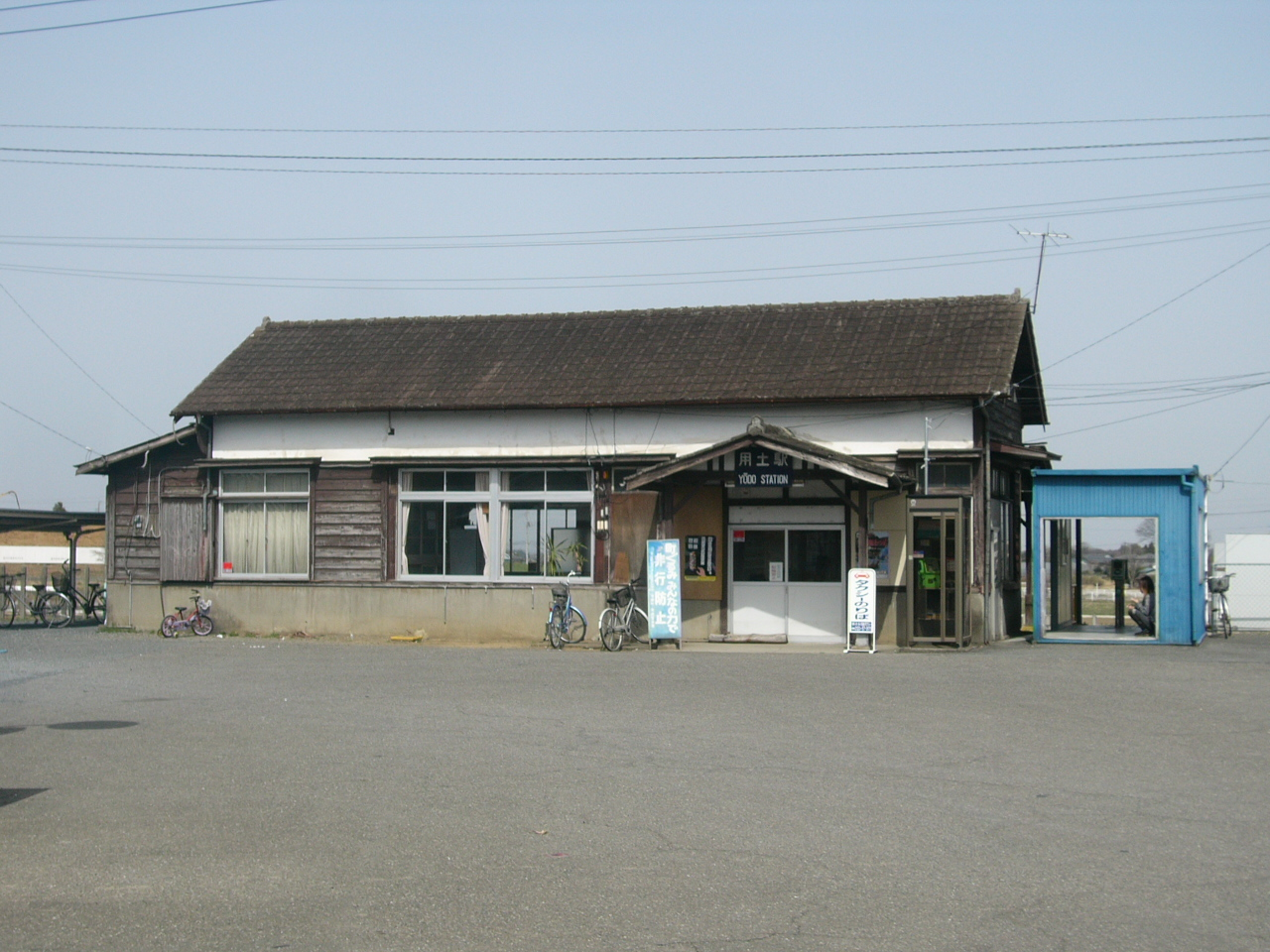
The station in 2006 before rebuilding

The station opened on 25 January 1933.

The station became Suica-compatible from February 2002. A new station building was completed in October 2012.

== Passenger statistics ==
In fiscal 2010, the station was used by an average of 89 passengers daily (boarding passengers only).

== Surrounding area ==
- Yorii Yodo Post Office
- Yodo Elementary School

== See also ==
- List of railway stations in Japan
