= Hachikō Line =

Railway line in Japan

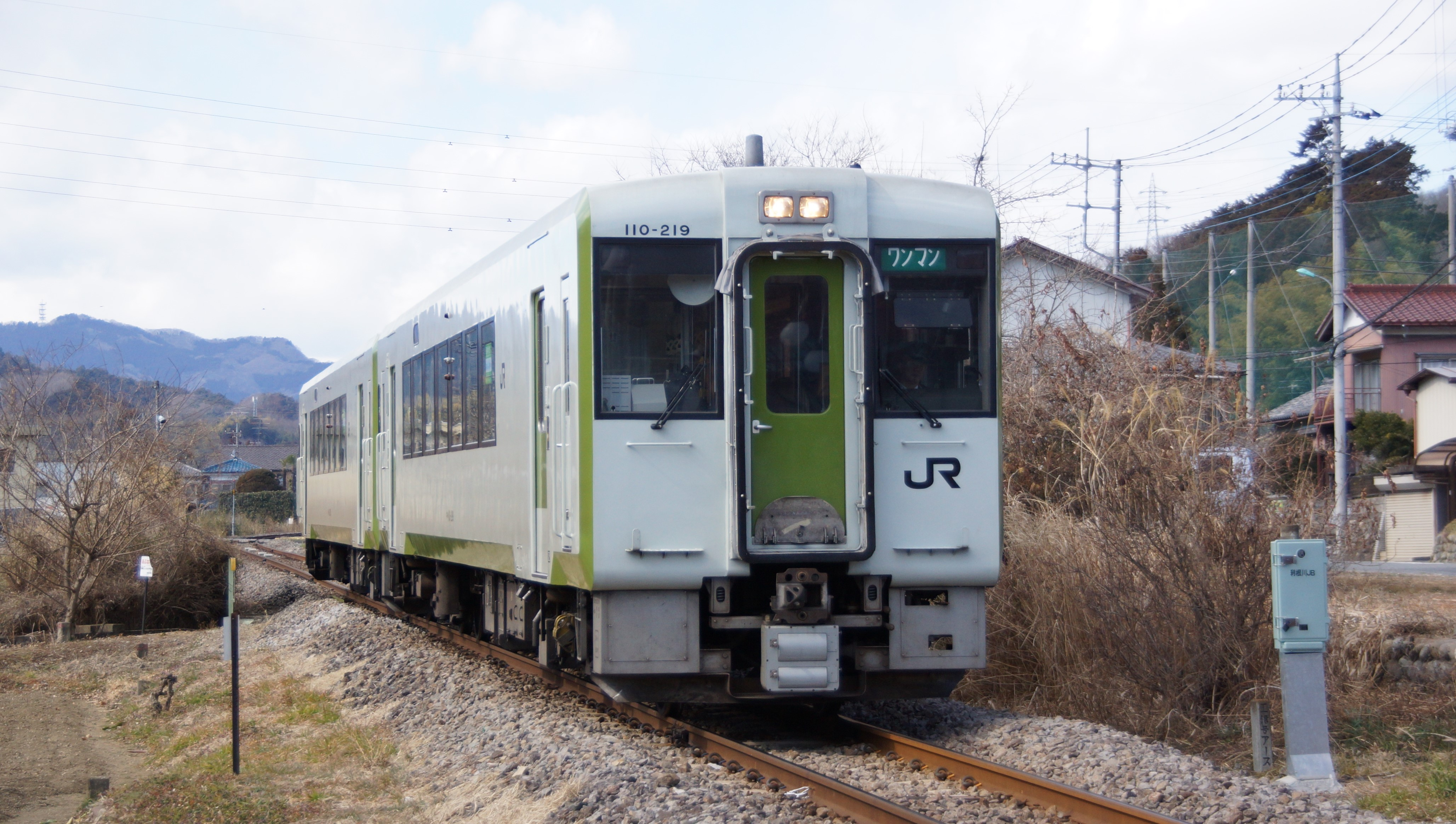
- A KiHa 110 series near Takezawa Station, February 2017

Overview
- Native name: 八高線
- Status: In operation
- Owner: JR East
- Locale: Tokyo Metropolis; Saitama Prefecture; Gunma Prefecture
- Termini: Hachiōji; Kuragano
- Stations: 23

Service
- Type: Heavy rail
- Operator: JR East
- Rolling stock: 209-3500 series EMU; E231-3000 series EMU; KiHa 110 series DMU; HB-E220 series hybrid DMU

History
- Opened: 1 July 1931; 95 years ago

Technical
- Line length: 92.0 km (57.2 mi)
- Number of tracks: Single-track (Hachiōji – Kita-Fujioka); Double-track shared with Takasaki Line (Kita-Fujioka – Kuragano)
- Character: Urban in some areas and rural in others
- Track gauge: 1,067 mm (3 ft 6 in)
- Electrification: 1,500 V DC overhead catenary (Hachiōji – Komagawa); None (Komagawa – Kuragano)
- Operating speed: 85 km/h (53 mph) (Hachiōji – Kita-Fujioka); 100 km/h (62 mph) (Kita-Fujioka – Kuragano)
Route map

Train on the Hachikō Line, 2020

The Hachikō Line (八高線, Hachikō-sen) is a 92.0 km (57.2 mi) regional railway line owned and operated by East Japan Railway Company (JR East). It is located within Tokyo, Saitama, and Gunma Prefectures in Japan. It connects Hachiōji Station in Hachiōji, Tokyo with Kuragano Station in Takasaki, Gunma Prefecture.

== Services ==
Komagawa Station in Hidaka, Saitama is the boundary point between two distinct sections. The southern section from Hachiōji to Komagawa is electrified at 1,500 V DC. Some trains terminate at Komagawa, while others continue over the Kawagoe Line to Kawagoe Station.

The non-electrified northern section connects Komagawa with Kuragano. All trains continue on the Takasaki Line to Takasaki, where transfer to the Jōetsu and Hokuriku Shinkansen is available. There are no through services connecting the southern and northern halves of the line.

The Hachikō Line takes the first kanji of its name from the first character of Hachiōji (八王子) and the second kanji from the first character of Takasaki (高崎).

== Stations ==
- All trains stop at every station.
- Stations marked "◇" or "^" allow passing; stations marked "|" do not. Stations marked "∥" are double-tracked.

=== Hachiōji - Komagawa ===
Station	Distance in km (mi)		Transfers	Track layout	Location	
Station	Between stations	Total	Transfers	Track layout	Location	
Hachiōji 八王子	—N/a	0 (0)	Chūō Line (Rapid); Yokohama Line; Keiō Line (Keiō-Hachiōji)	◇	Hachiōji	Tokyo
Kita-Hachiōji 北八王子	3.1 (1.9)	3.1 (1.9)		◇	Hachiōji	Tokyo
Komiya 小宮	2.0 (1.2)	5.1 (3.2)		◇	Hachiōji	Tokyo
Haijima 拝島	4.8 (3.0)	9.9 (6.2)	Ōme Line; Itsukaichi Line; Seibu Haijima Line	◇	Akishima	Tokyo
Higashi-Fussa 東福生	2.8 (1.7)	12.7 (7.9)		◇	Fussa	Tokyo
Hakonegasaki 箱根ヶ崎	3.0 (1.9)	15.7 (9.8)		◇	Mizuho, Nishitama District	Tokyo
Kaneko 金子	4.8 (3.0)	20.5 (12.7)		◇	Iruma	Saitama
Higashi-Hannō 東飯能	5.1 (3.2)	25.6 (15.9)	Seibu Ikebukuro Line	◇	Hannō	Saitama
Komagawa 高麗川	5.5 (3.4)	31.1 (19.3)	■ Kawagoe Line (through to Kawagoe) ■ Hachikō Line (for Takasaki)	◇	Hidaka	Saitama

=== Komagawa - Takasaki ===
Station	Distance in km (mi)		Transfers	Track layout	Location	
Station	Between stations	Total	Transfers	Track layout	Location	
Komagawa 高麗川	5.5 (3.4)	31.1 (19.3)	■ Kawagoe Line ■ Hachikō Line (for Hachiōji)	◇	Hidaka	Saitama
Moro 毛呂	5.8 (3.6)	36.9 (22.9)		◇	Moroyama, Iruma District	Saitama
Ogose 越生	2.7 (1.7)	39.6 (24.6)	Tobu Ogose Line	|	Ogose, Iruma District	Saitama
Myōkaku 明覚	5.2 (3.2)	44.8 (27.8)		◇	Tokigawa, Hiki District	Saitama
Ogawamachi 小川町	8.0 (5.0)	52.8 (32.8)	Tobu Tojo Line	◇	Ogawa, Hiki District	Saitama
Takezawa 竹沢	3.5 (2.2)	56.3 (35.0)		|	Ogawa, Hiki District	Saitama
Orihara 折原	4.0 (2.5)	60.3 (37.5)		|	Yorii, Ōsato District	Saitama
Yorii 寄居	3.6 (2.2)	63.9 (39.7)	Tobu Tojo Line ■ Chichibu Main Line	◇	Yorii, Ōsato District	Saitama
Yōdo 用土	4.5 (2.8)	68.4 (42.5)		|	Yorii, Ōsato District	Saitama
Matsuhisa 松久	2.7 (1.7)	71.1 (44.2)		|	Misato, Kodama District	Saitama
Kodama 児玉	4.8 (3.0)	75.9 (47.2)		◇	Honjō	Saitama
Tanshō 丹荘	4.1 (2.5)	80.0 (49.7)		|	Kamikawa, Kodama District	Saitama
Gunma-Fujioka 群馬藤岡	4.7 (2.9)	84.7 (52.6)		◇	Fujioka	Gunma
Kita-Fujioka 北藤岡	3.7 (2.3)	88.4 (54.9)		^	Fujioka	Gunma
Kuragano 倉賀野	3.6 (2.2)	92.0 (57.2)	■ Takasaki Line (for Tokyo)	||	Takasaki	Gunma
Through to Takasaki on the Takasaki Line
Takasaki 高崎	4.4 (2.7)	96.4 (59.9)	Joetsu Shinkansen; Hokuriku Shinkansen ■ Shinetsu Main Line ■ Joetsu Line ■ Ryōmō Line ■ Agatsuma Line ■ Jōshin Dentetsu Jōshin Line	||	Takasaki	Gunma

== Rolling stock ==
- 209-3500 series 4-car EMUs x 5 (Kawagoe Line/Hachiko Line services since 7 May 2018)
- E231-3000 series 4-car EMUs x 6 (Kawagoe Line/Hachiko Line services since 19 February 2018)
- HB-E220 series hybrid DMUs (since 1 December 2025)

From 2017, former E231-0 series ten-car sets based at Mitaka Depot for use on Chūō–Sōbu Line services were reformed and converted to become four-car E231-3000 series sets based at Kawagoe for use on Kawagoe Line and Hachiko Line services. The first set entered revenue service on the line on 19 February 2018.

From 2018, former 209-500 series ten-car sets based at Mitaka Depot for use on Chūō–Sōbu Line services were reformed and converted to become four-car 209-3500 series sets based at Kawagoe for use on Kawagoe Line and Hachiko Line services.

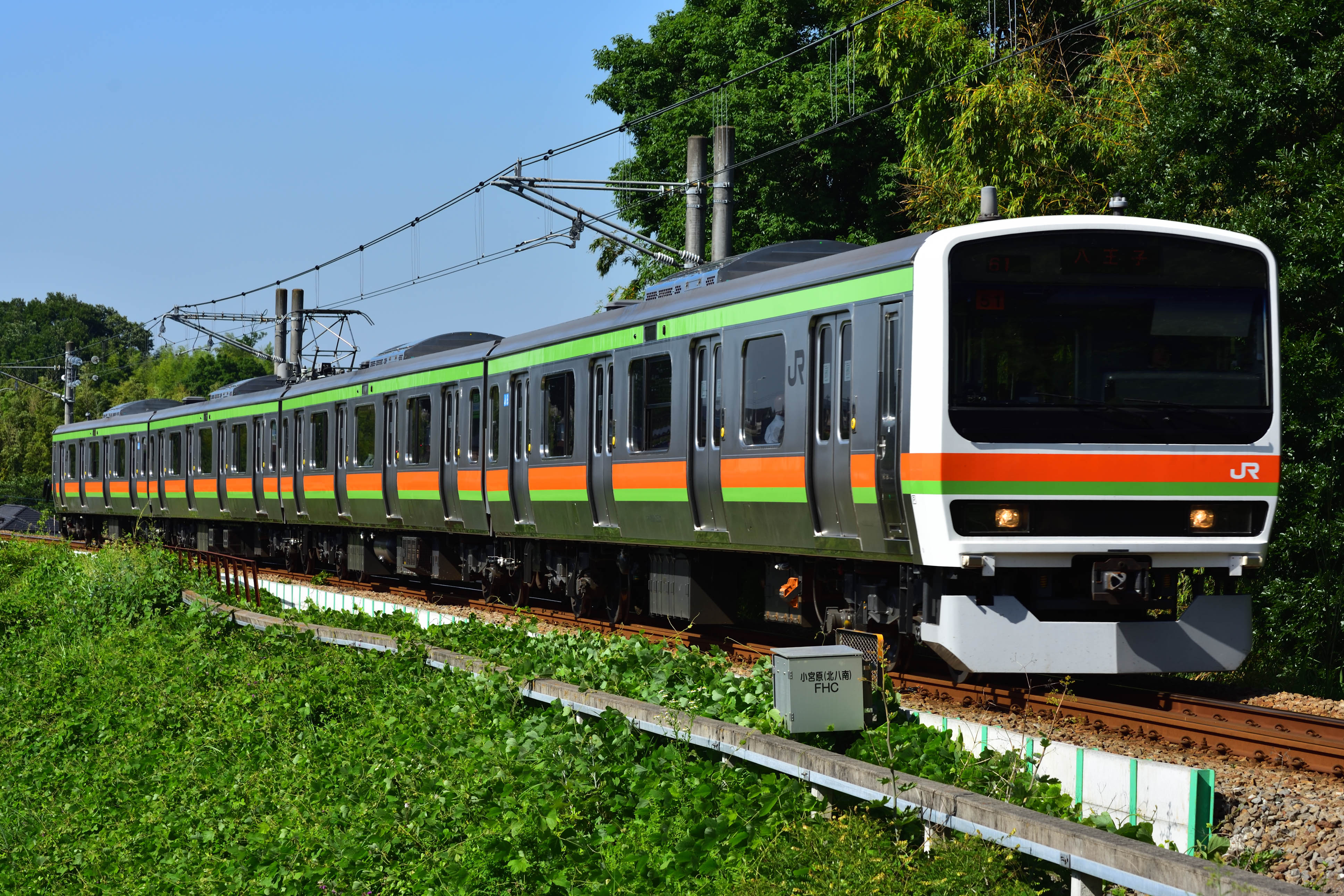
209-3500 series

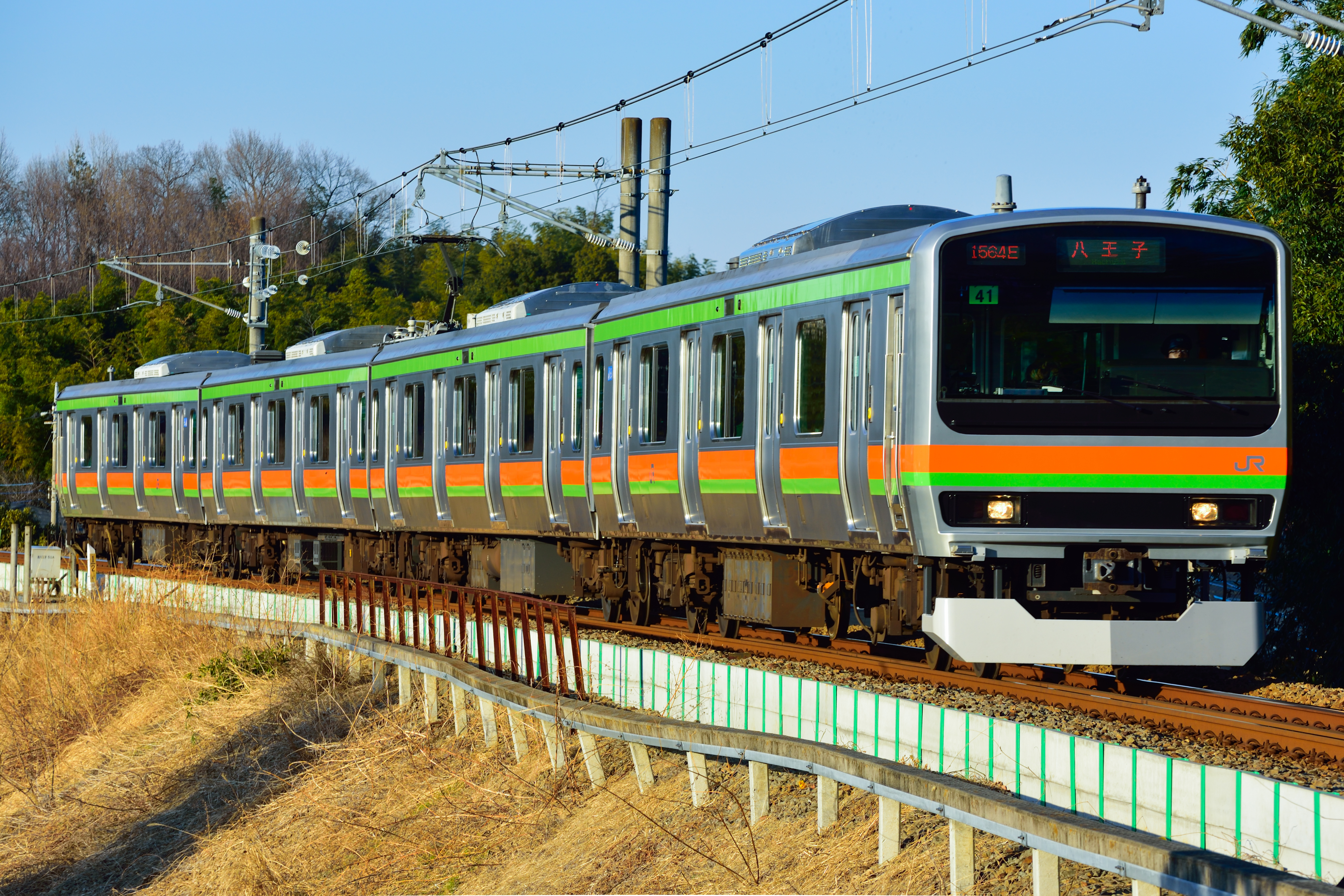
E231-3000 series

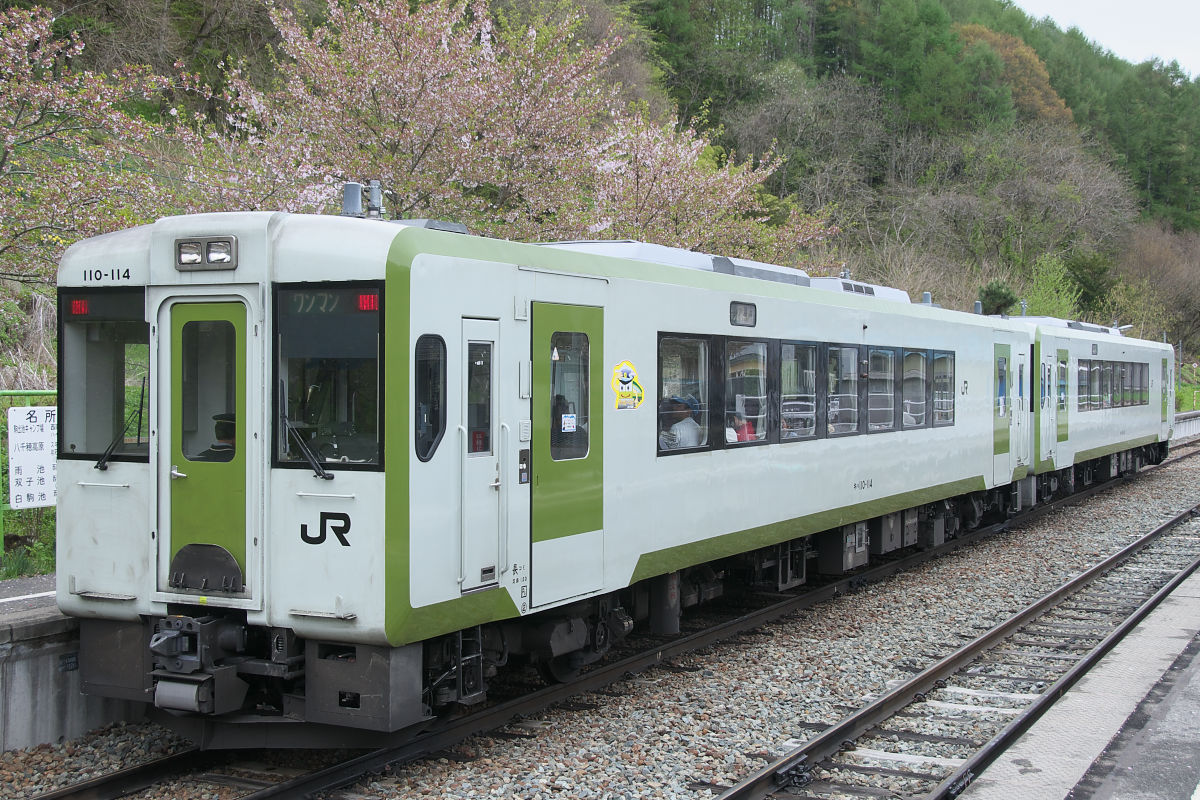
KiHa 110 series

=== Former rolling stock ===
- KiHa 35 DMUs (until 15 March 1996)
- 103-3000 series EMUs (from March 1985 until October 2005)
- 103-3500 series EMU (from March 1996 until March 2005)
- 201 series EMUs (Chūō Line (Rapid) through services between Komagawa and Haijima, until March 2008)
- 205-3000 series 4-car EMUs x 5 (Kawagoe Line/Hachiko Line services since 11 November 2003 until July 2018)
- 209-3000 series 4-car EMUs x 4 (Kawagoe Line/Hachiko Line services from 16 March 1996 until February 2019)
- 209-3100 series 4-car EMUs x 2 (Kawagoe Line/Hachiko Line services since 17 April 2005 until 2022)
- E233 series EMUs (Chūō Line (Rapid) through services between Komagawa and Haijima, from 17 March 2007 until 11 March 2022)
- KiHa 110 series DMUs (formed as 2- or 3-car trains for services north of Komagawa) (from 18 March 1993 until 13 March 2026)
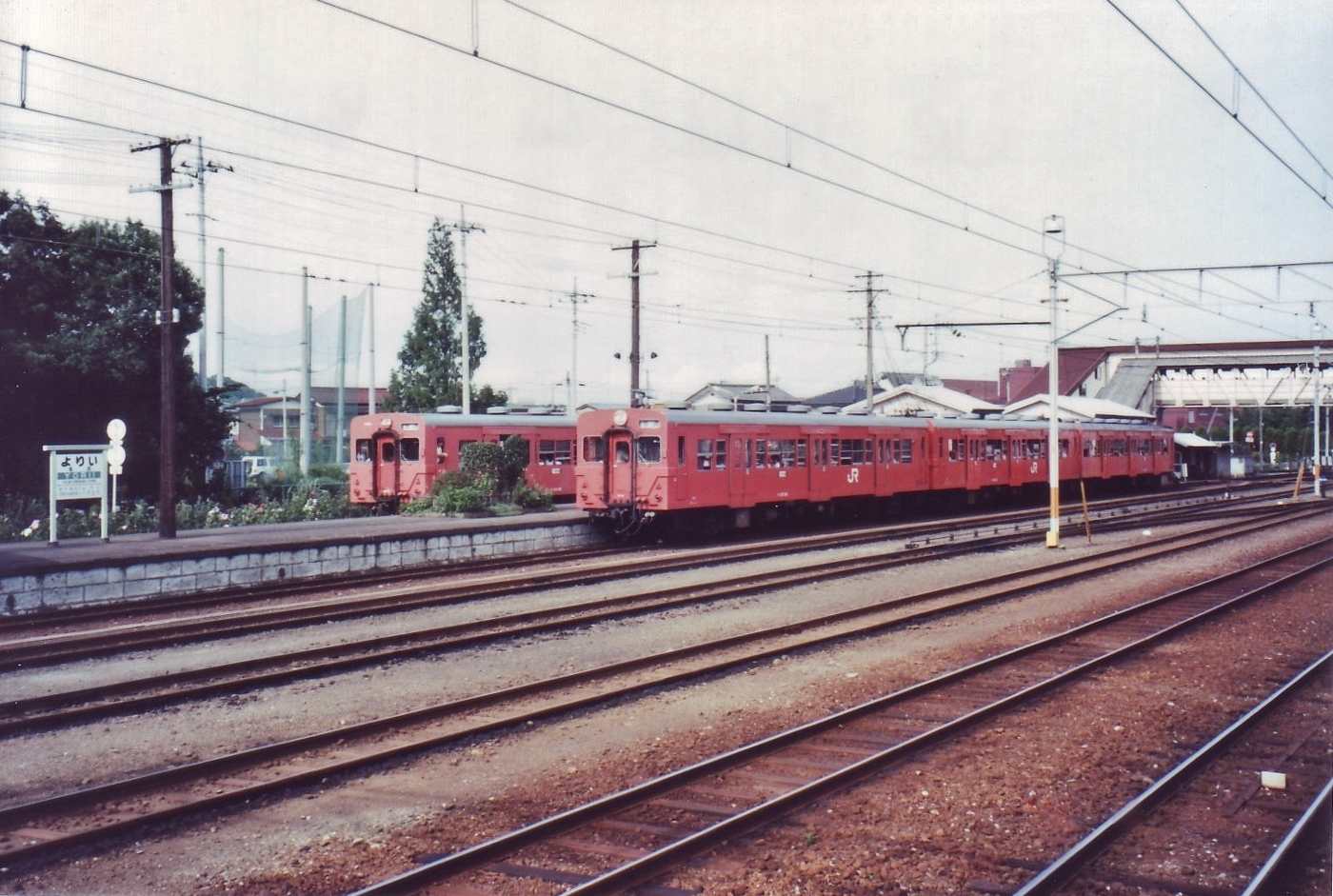
Hachiko Line KiHa 35 DMUs passing at Yorii Station in August 1992

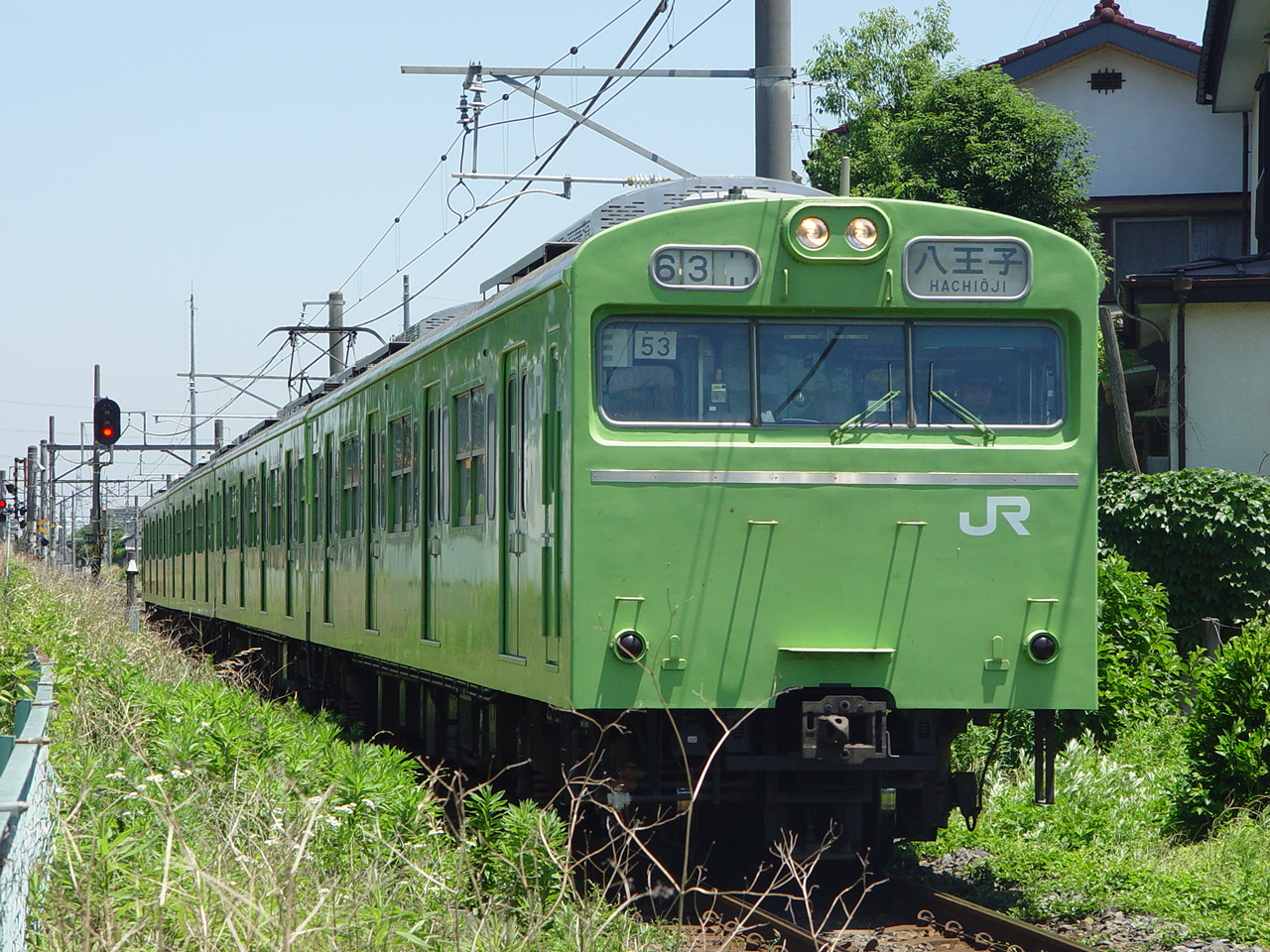
A Hachiko Line 103-3000 series EMU in June 2004

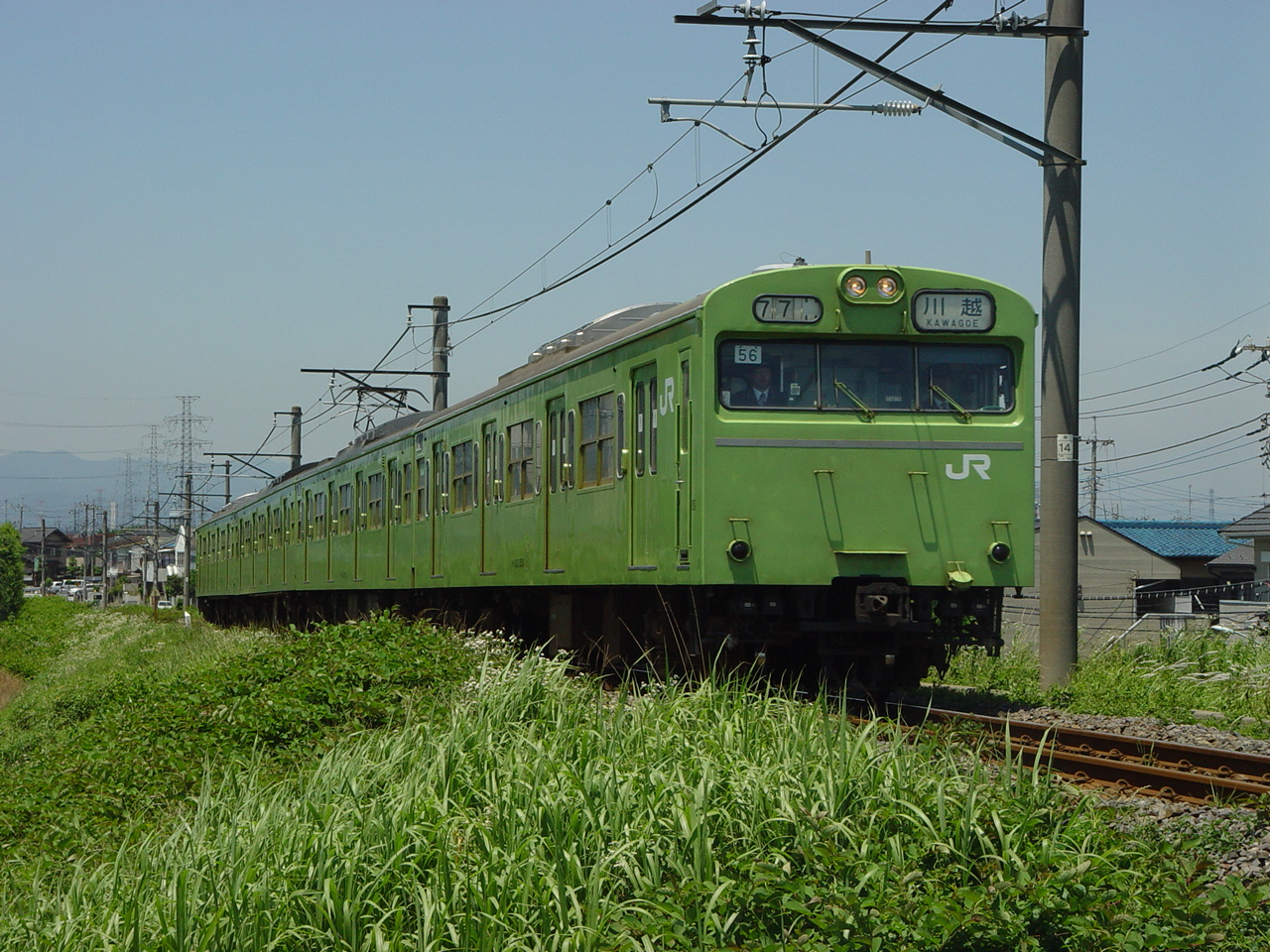
A Hachiko Line 103-3500 series EMU in June 2004

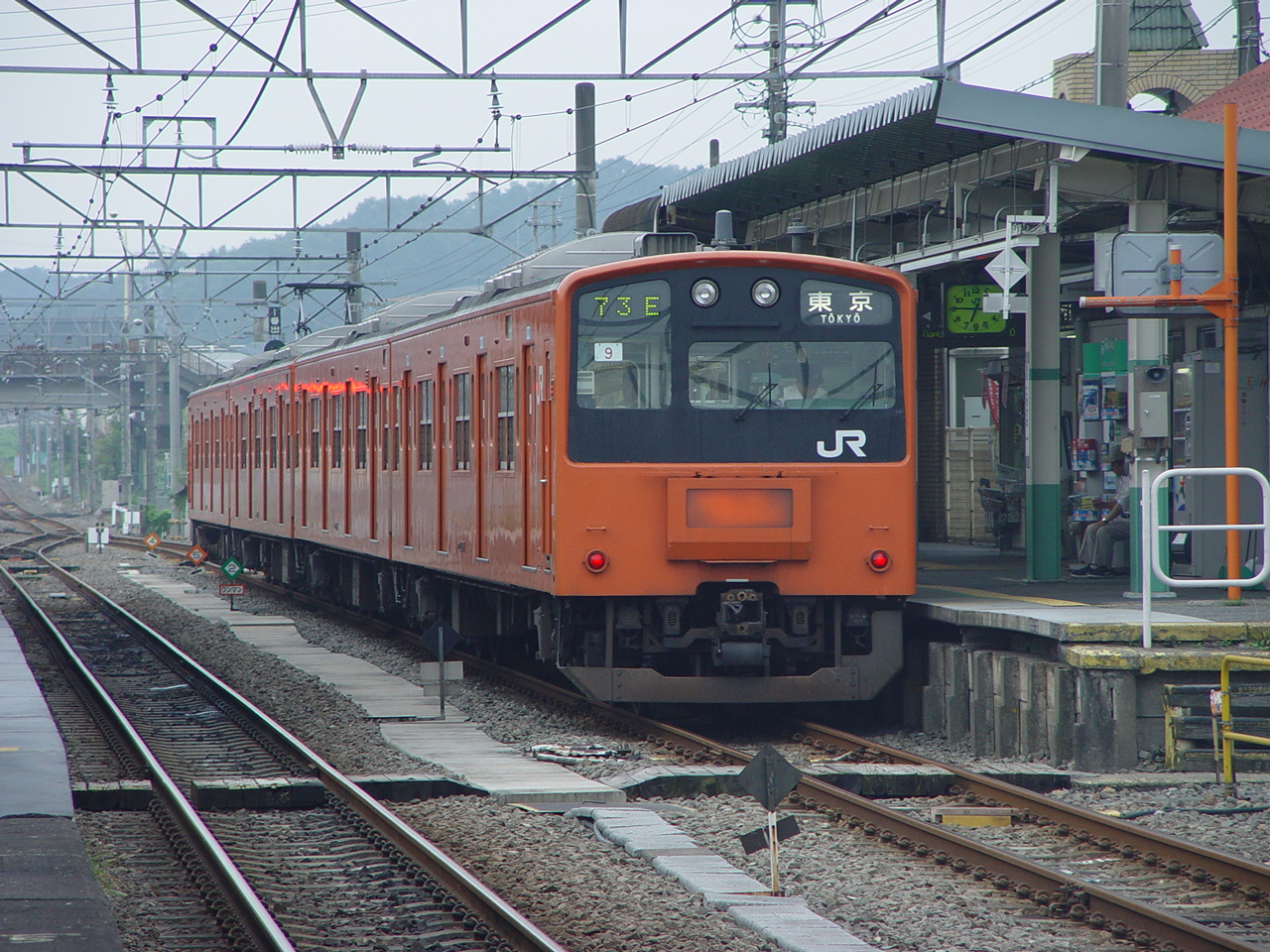
A Chūō Line 201 series on a Hachiko Line through service in August 2003

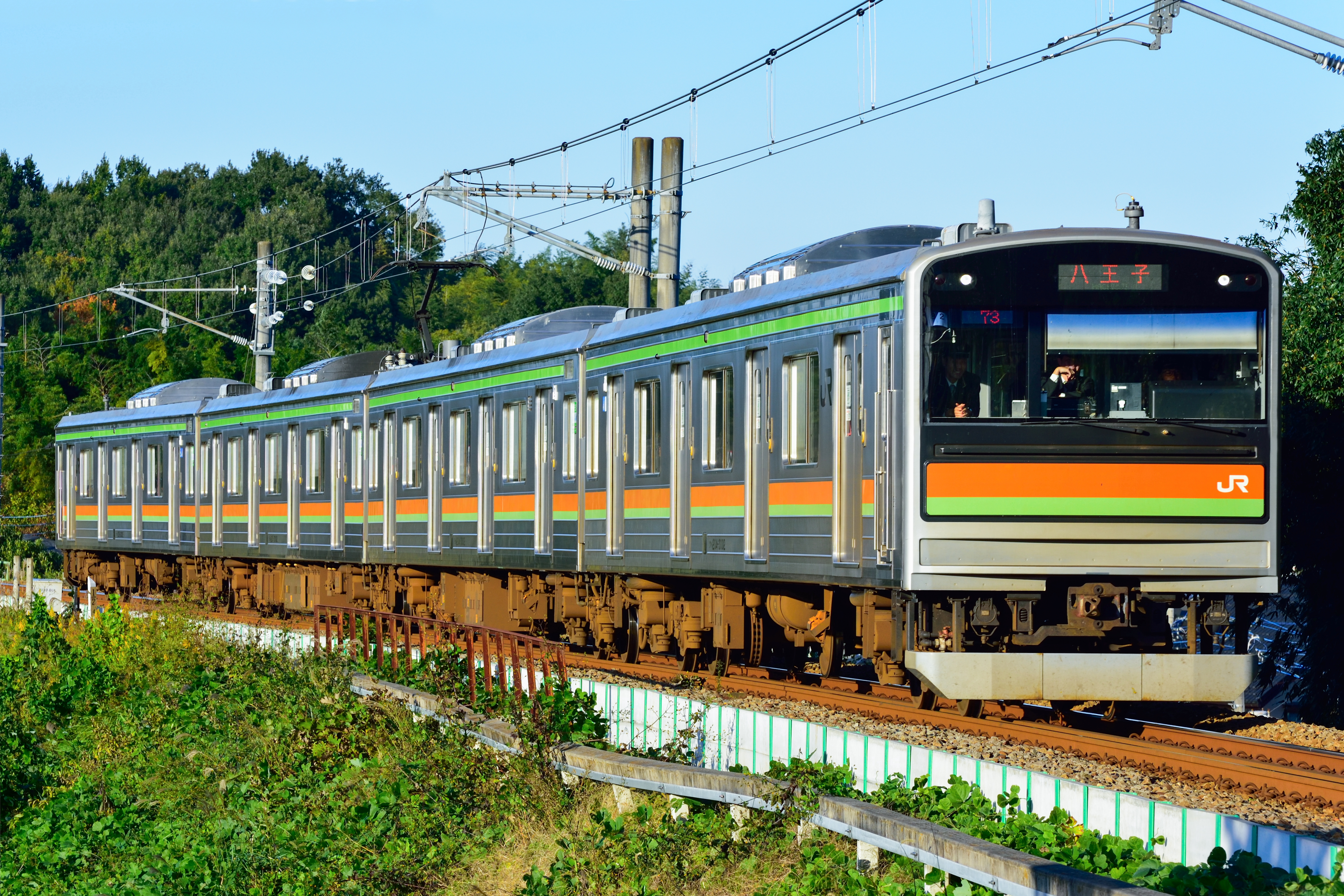
205-3000 series

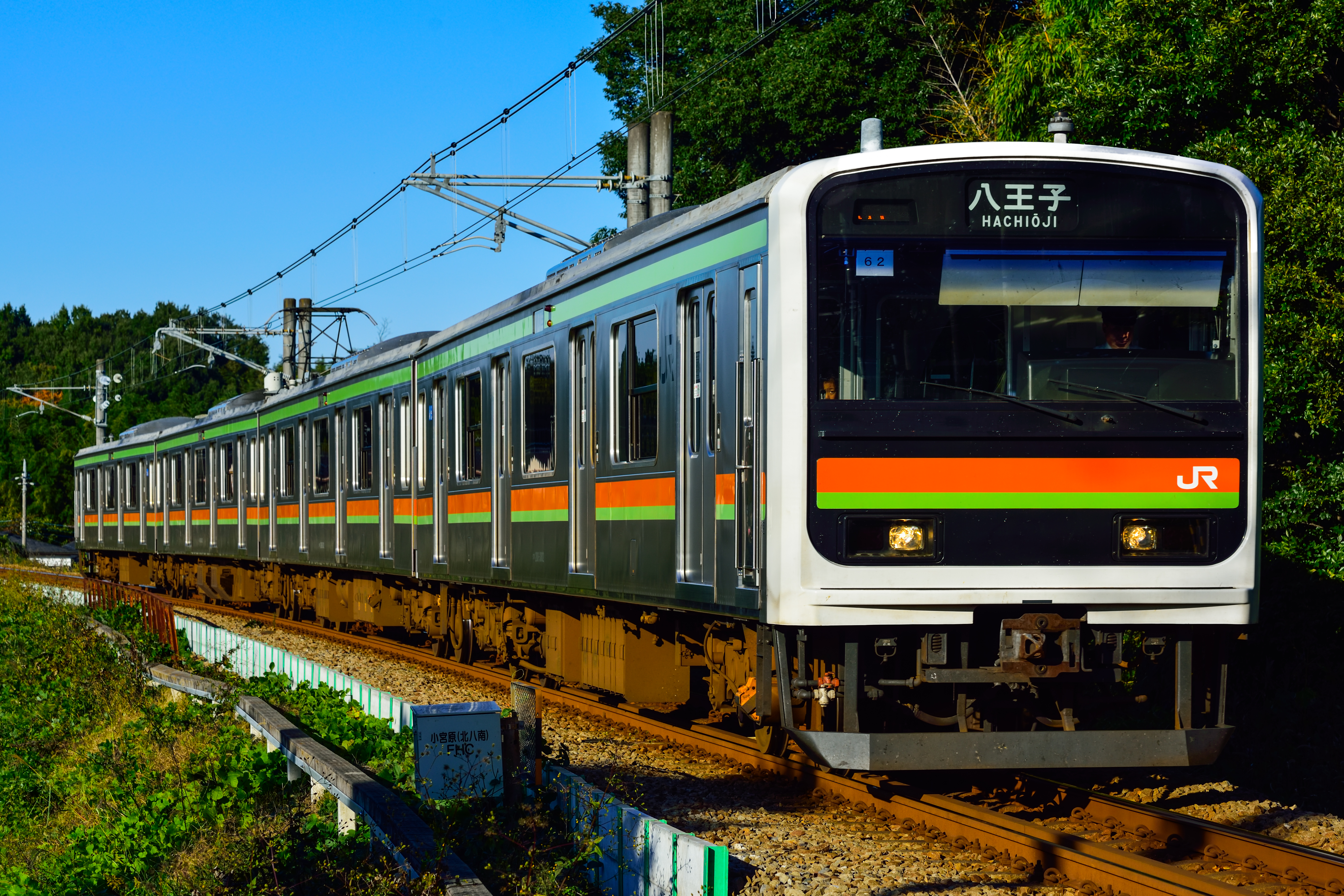
209-3000 series

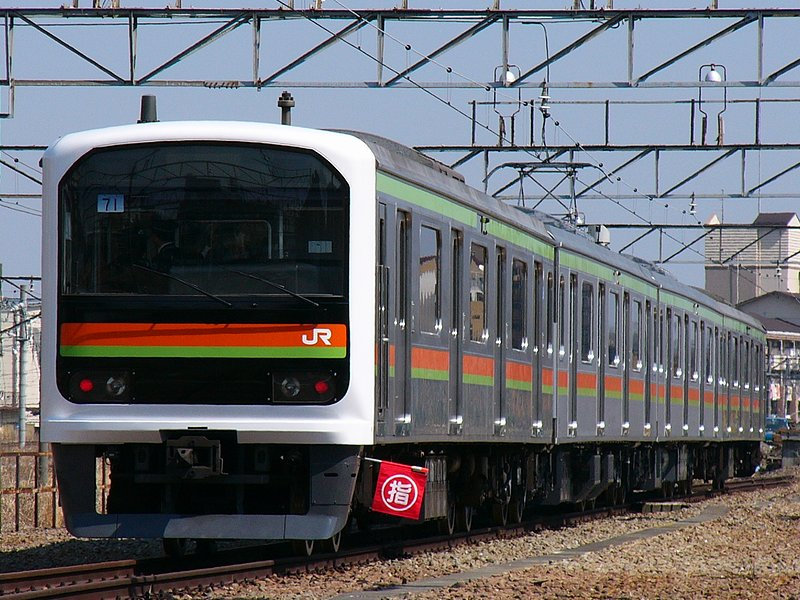
209-3100 series

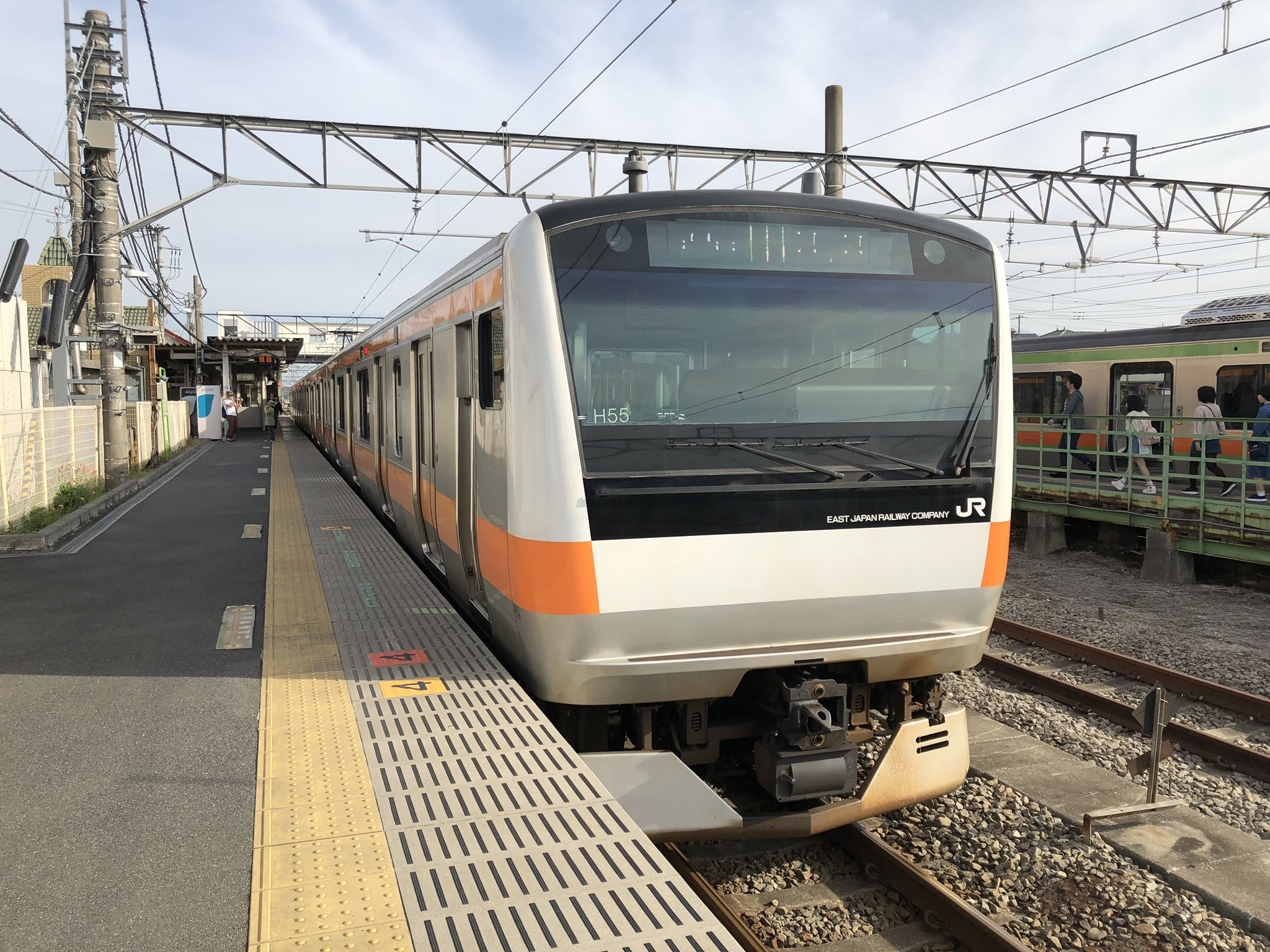
E233-0 series

== History ==
The first section of the line, named the Hachikō North Line (Japanese: 八高北線, Hepburn: Hachikō-kita-sen), opened from Kuragano to Kodama on 1 July 1931, followed by the section from Hachioji to Higashi-Hanno, named the Hachikō South Line (Japanese: 八高南線, Hepburn: Hachikō-minami-sen), on 10 December 1931. The Hachiko North Line was extended southward from Kodama to Yorii on 25 January 1933, and the Hachiko South Line was extended northward from Higashi-Hanno to Ogose on 15 April 1933. The Hachiko South Line was further extended northward from Ogose to Ogawamachi on 24 March 1934, and the last section between Ogawamachi and Yorii opened on 6 October 1934, connecting the north and south sections, and completing the entire line, which became known simply as the Hachiko Line.

All passenger operations were switch from steam haulage to electric trains from 20 November 1958.

CTC signalling was commissioned over the entire line from 27 February 1985. On 1 April 1987, with the privatization and splitting of Japanese National Railways (JNR), the Hachiko Line was transferred to the ownership of JR East.

From 16 March 1996, the Hachioji to Komagawa section was electrified at 1,500 V DC, and services on the non-electrified section north of Komagawa to and from Takasaki were operated separately as one-man driver only operation services using KiHa 110 series DMUs, and the southern section began through service operations to the Kawagoe Line to Kawagoe Station. Also from the same date until 11 March 2022, some morning rush hour services left the Hachikō Line at Haijima Station and travel to Tokyo via the Ōme Line and Chūō Line; the reverse happened during the evening rush.

Starting 12 March 2022, the southern section from Hachiōji to Komagawa (and through services to the Kawagoe Line) began one-man driver only operation services using the existing 209-3500 and E231-3000 series EMUs.

From the start of the revised timetable on 15 March 2025, single-car services between Komagawa and Takasaki were discontinued.

=== Former connecting lines ===
- Komagawa station – A freight-only line serving the Nippon Cement works in Hidaka operated from 1963 until 1984, which also connected to Nishi-Oya on the Tobu Ogose Line.

=== Accidents ===
At 07:40 on 24 August 1945, a head-on collision at the Tamagawa bridge resulted in 105 fatalities.

The Hachikō Line derailment in 1947 is Japan's worst rail accident since World War II in terms of fatalities.
