= Komagawa Station =

Railway station in Hidaka, Saitama Prefecture, Japan

Komagawa Station 高麗川駅
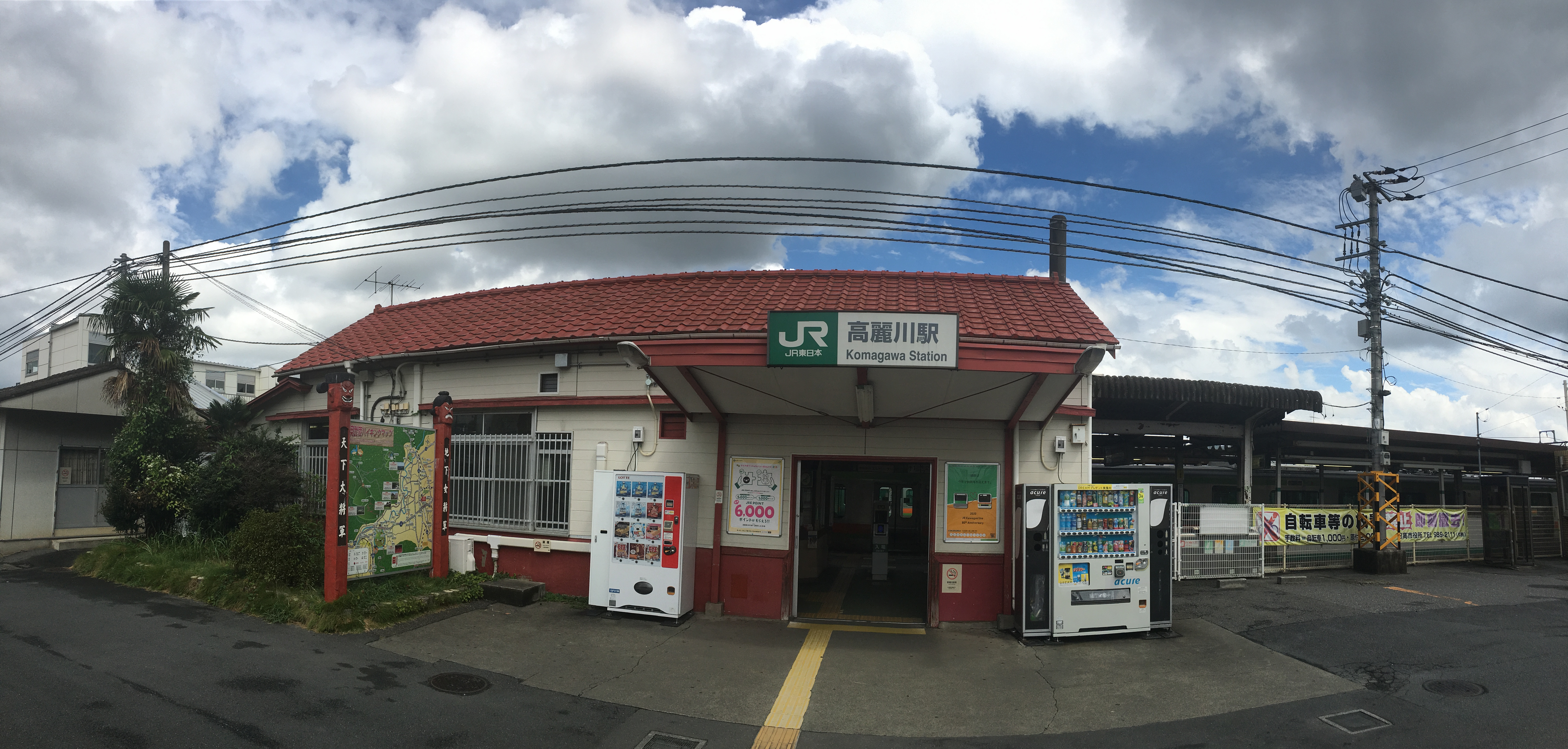
- Komagawa Station entrance in September 2020

General information
- Location: 336-2 Harajuku, Hidaka-shi, Saitama-ken 350-1205; Japan
- Coordinates: 35.8965°N 139.3379°E
- Operator: JR East
- Lines: ■ Hachikō Line; ■ Kawagoe Line
- Distance: 31.1 km from Hachiōji
- Platforms: 1 side + 1 island platform
- Tracks: 3
- Connections: Bus stop

Other information
- Status: Staffed ( "Midori no Madoguchi" )
- Website: Official website

History
- Opened: 15 April 1933
- Electrified: 16 March 1996

Passengers
- FY2019: 4483 (daily, boarding only)

Services
Preceding station	JR East	Following station
through to Kawagoe Line	Hachikō Line electrified	Higashi-Hannō towards Hachiōji
Moro towards Takasaki	Hachikō Line non-electrified	Terminus
Musashi-Takahagi towards Kawagoe	Kawagoe Line	through to Hachiko Line
Location
- Location within Saitama Prefecture Location within Japan

Komagawa Station (高麗川駅, Komagawa-eki) is a junction passenger railway station located in the city of Hidaka, Saitama, Japan, operated by the East Japan Railway Company (JR East).

== Lines ==
Komagawa Station is served by the Hachikō Line for Hachiōji and Takasaki, and the Kawagoe Line for Kawagoe. The station is located 31.1 kilometers from the terminus of the Hachikō Line at Hachiōji and 30.6 kilometers from the terminus of the Kawagoe Line at Ōmiya. The Hachikō Line is divided here into the electrified southern section to Hachiōji and the non-electrified northern section to Kuragano. Many Kawagoe Line trains from Kawagoe continue to Hachiōji. The station is also served by trains to and from Tokyo via the Chūō Line in the morning and evening peak periods.

== Station layout ==
The station consists of one side platform and an island platform serving three tracks. Storage tracks are located on the east side of the station. The station has a "Midori no Madoguchi" staffed ticket office.

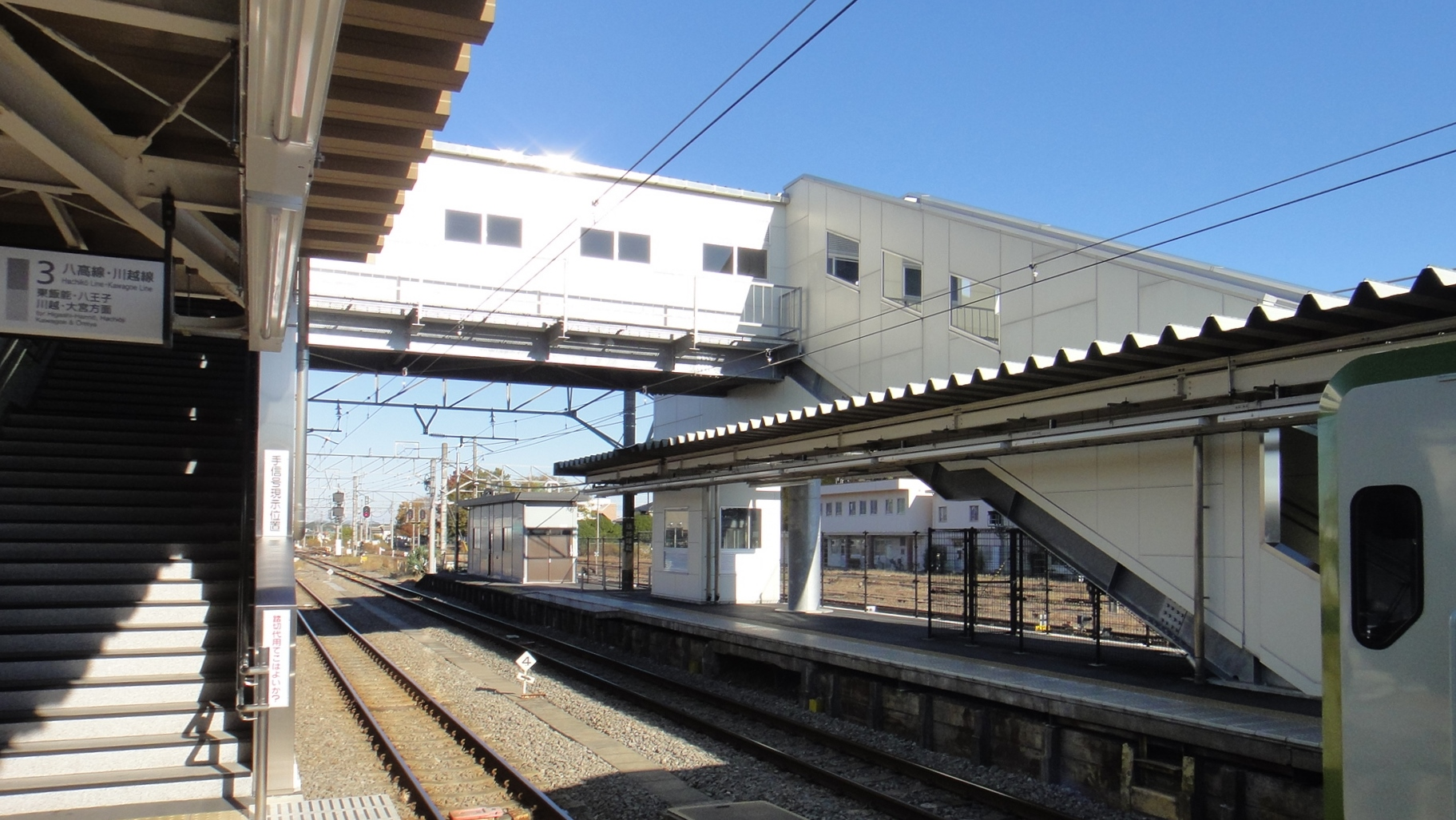
View from the south end of platform 1 in November 2012

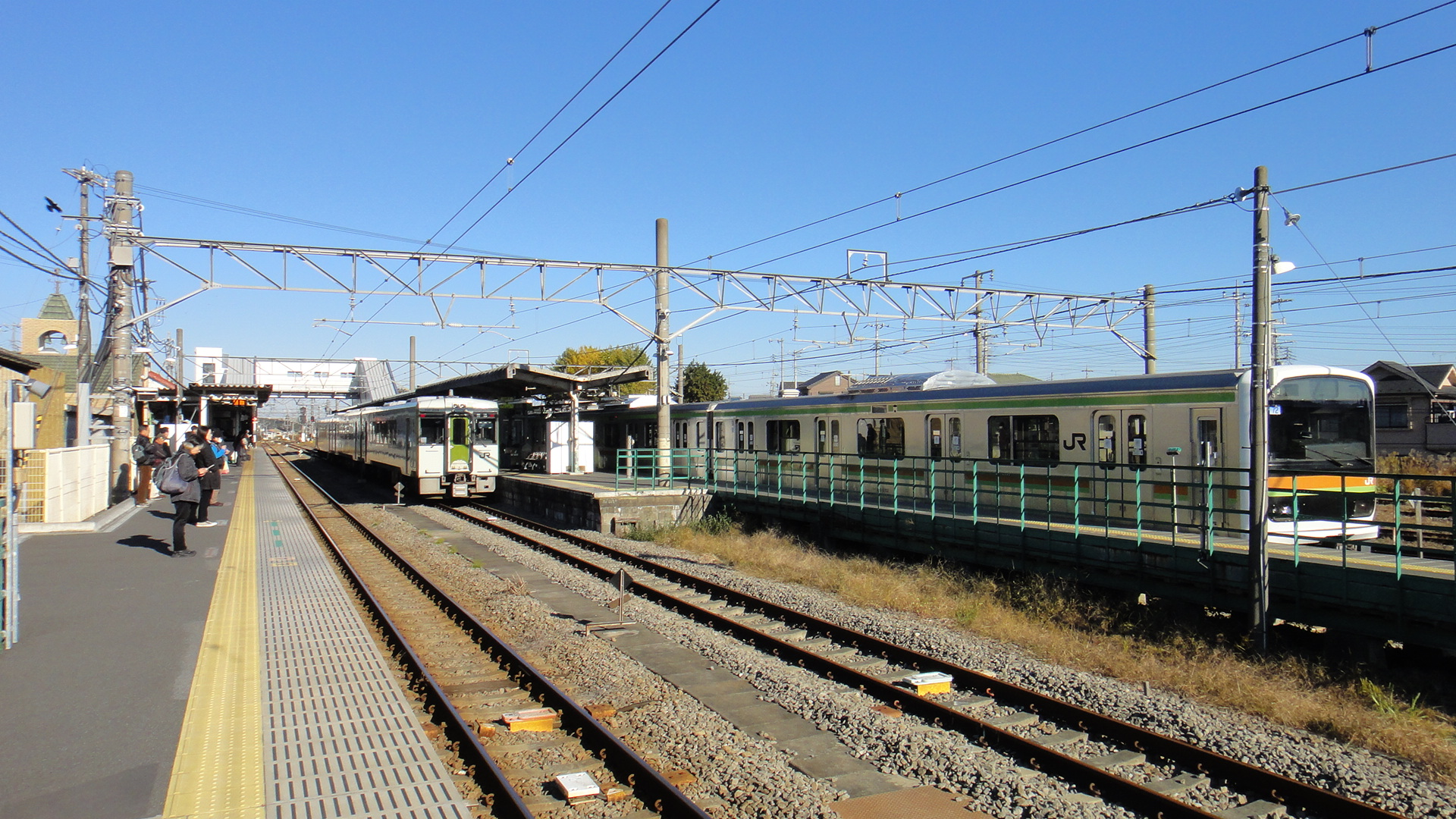
The north end of platform 1, showing the new footbridge connecting the platforms in November 2012

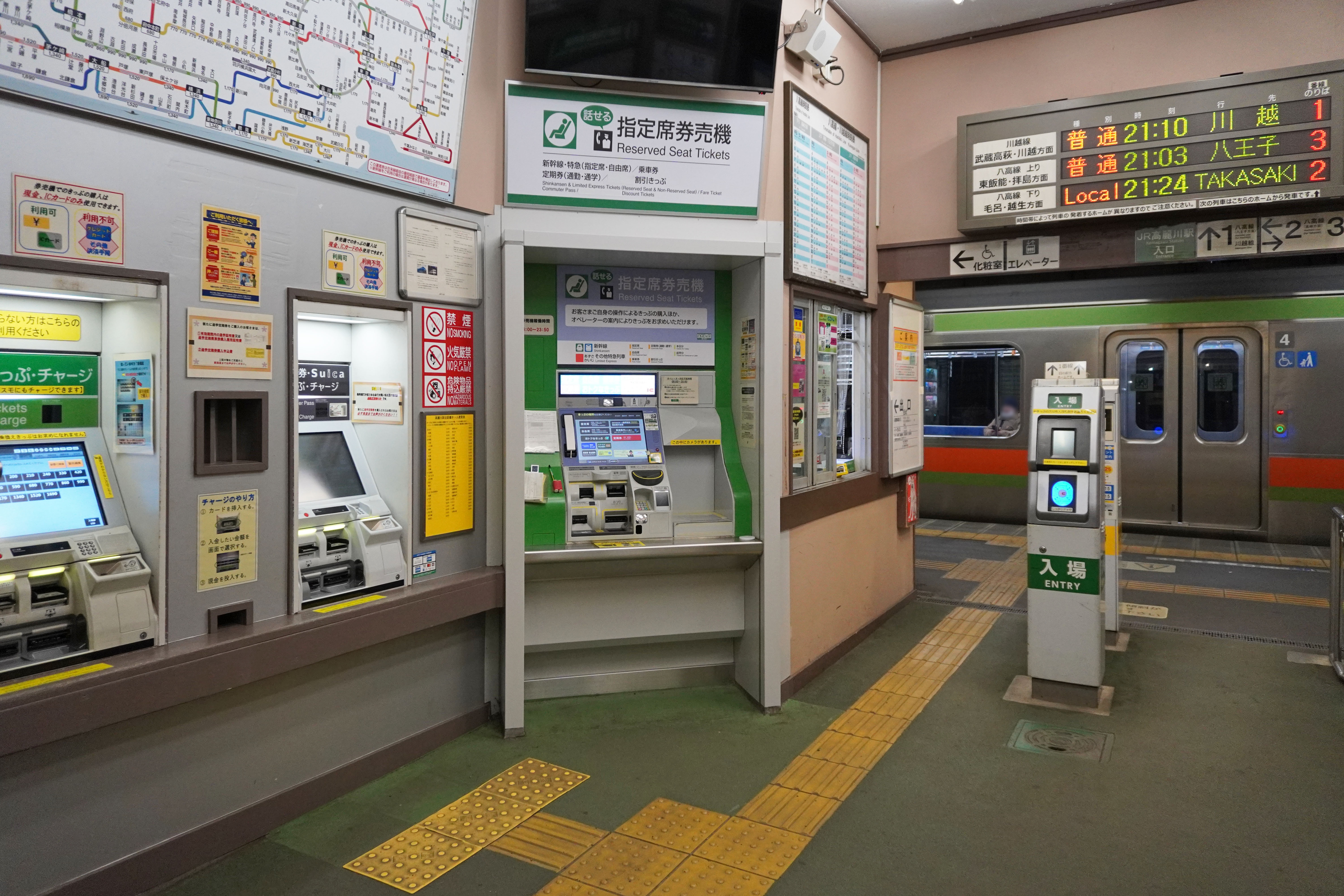
Automatic ticket gate, February 2023

=== Platforms ===
1	■ Hachikō Line	for Higashi-Hannō, Haijima, and Hachiōji
1	■ Kawagoe Line	for Kawagoe
2	■ Hachikō Line	for Ogawamachi and Takasaki
3	■ Hachikō Line	for Higashi-Hannō, Haijima, and Hachiōji
3	■ Kawagoe Line	for Kawagoe

== History ==
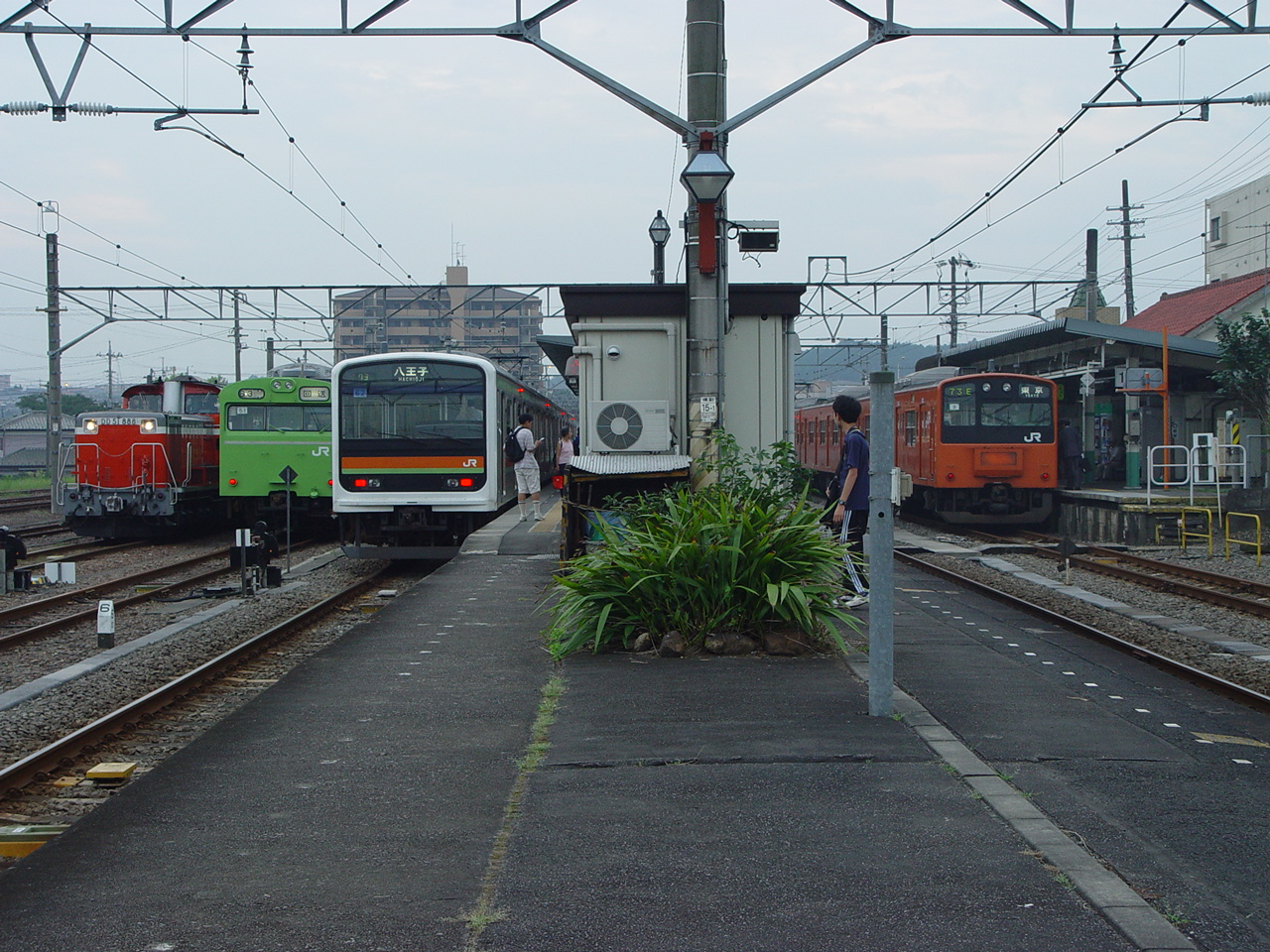
Early morning view of the platforms looking south in August 2003, before the footbridge was built between the platforms

The station opened on 15 April 1933. With the privatization of JNR on 1 April 1987, the station came under the control of JR East.

The Kawagoe Line from Kawagoe was electrified on 30 September 1985. The southern section of the Hachikō Line to and from Hachiōji was electrified on 16 March 1996, with through services commencing between Hachiōji and Kawagoe.

== Passenger statistics ==
In fiscal 2019, the station was used by an average of 4483 passengers daily (boarding passengers only).

The passenger figures for previous years are as shown below.

Fiscal year	Daily average
2000	4,187
2005	4,179
2010	4,582
2015	4,618

== Surrounding area ==
- Koma Shrine
- Josai University
- Hidaka City Hall
- Hidaka Post Office

== See also ==
- List of railway stations in Japan
