= Fukaya Station =

Railway station in Fukaya, Saitama Prefecture, Japan

Fukaya Station 深谷駅
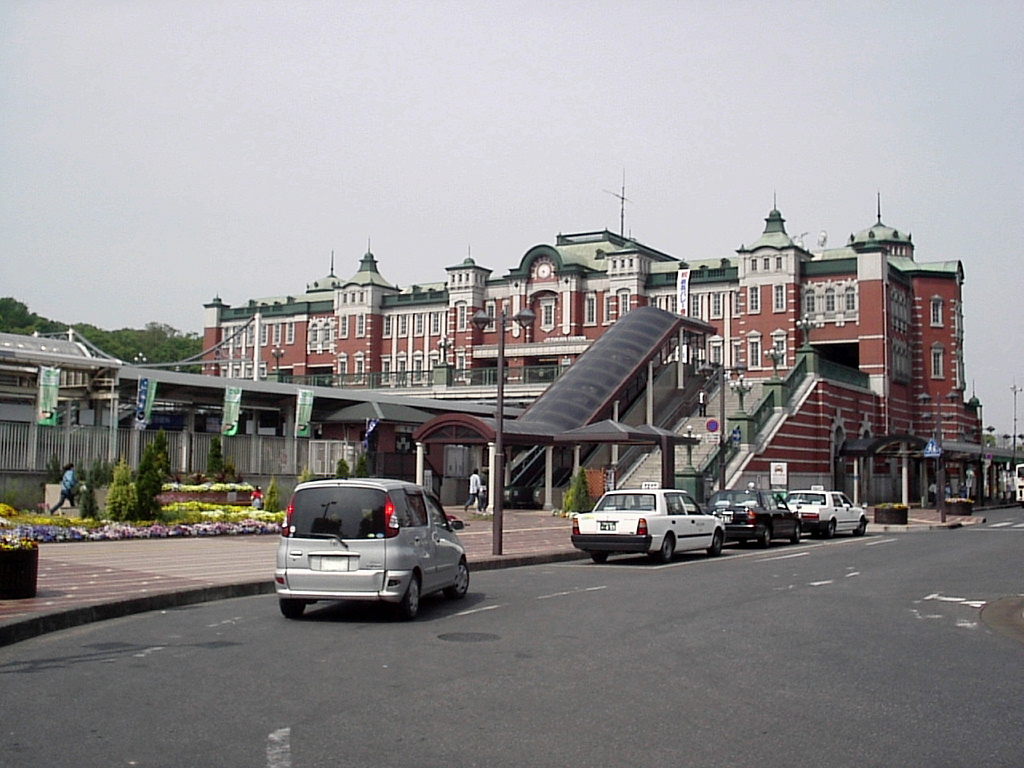
- North entrance to Fukaya Station, August 2012

General information
- Location: Kashiwaza 3-1-8 Nishijima-cho, Fukaya-shi, Saitama-ken 366-0824; Japan
- Coordinates: 36.1913°N 139.2813°E
- Operator: JR East
- Line: ■ Takasaki Line
- Platforms: 1 side + 1 island platform

Other information
- Status: Staffed ("Midori no Madoguchi")
- Website: Official website

History
- Opened: 21 October 1883

Passengers
- FY2019: 10,013 daily

Services
Preceding station	JR East	Following station
Honjō towards Takasaki	Akagi	Kumagaya towards Ueno or Shinjuku
Okabe towards Takasaki	Takasaki Line Rapid Urban	Kagohara One-way operation
Okabe towards Maebashi	Takasaki Line Local	Kagohara towards Tokyo
Okabe towards Takasaki	Shōnan–Shinjuku Line Special Rapid	Kagohara towards Odawara
Okabe towards Maebashi	Shōnan–Shinjuku Line Rapid	Kagohara towards Odawara
Location
- Location within Saitama Prefecture Location within Japan

Fukaya Station (深谷駅, Fukaya-eki) is a passenger railway station located in the city of Fukaya, Saitama, Japan, operated by the East Japan Railway Company (JR East).

== Lines ==
Fukaya Station is served by the Takasaki Line, with through Shōnan-Shinjuku Line and Ueno-Tokyo Line services to and from the Tōkaidō Main Line. It is 45.8 kilometers from the nominal starting point of the Takasaki Line at Ōmiya.

== Layout ==
The station has one side platform and one island platform serving three tracks, connected by a footbridge, with an elevated station building located above the platforms. The station has a "Midori no Madoguchi" staffed ticket office.

=== Platforms ===
1	■ Takasaki Line (Ueno-Tokyo Line)	for Ōmiya, Ueno, Tokyo, Yokohama, Atami, Numazu and Ito (via Tokaido Line and Ito Line)
1	■ Shōnan-Shinjuku Line	for Ōmiya, Shinjuku, Yokohama, Ōfuna, and Odawara (via Tokaido Line)
2,3	■ Takasaki Line	for Honjō, Takasaki, and Maebashi

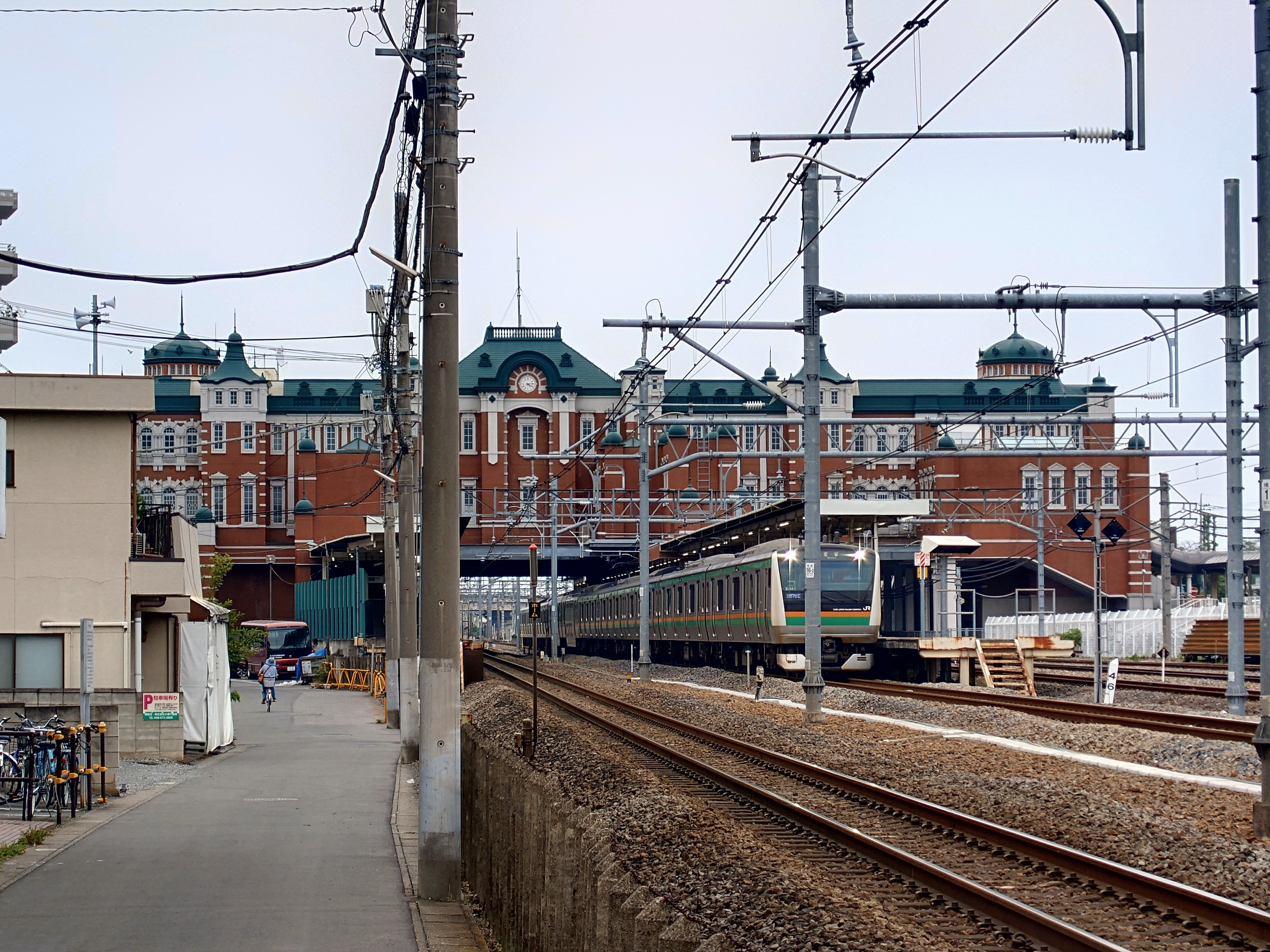
West side of the station with a Takasaki Line train stopped at platform 2

== History ==
The station opened on 21 October 1883. The station became part of the JR East network after the privatization of the JNR on 1 April 1987. A new station building modeled after Tokyo Station was completed in August 1996, with its brick built by Japan Brick Company. Bricks used in the Marunouchi side of the Tokyo Station building are produced by this company.

== Passenger statistics ==
In fiscal 2019, the station was used by an average of 10,013 passengers daily (boarding passengers only).

== Surrounding area ==
- Karasawa River
- Fukaya City Hall
- Fukaya Post Office
- National Route 17

== See also ==
- List of railway stations in Japan
