= Kagohara Station =

Railway station in Kumagaya, Saitama Prefecture, Japan

Kagohara Station 籠原駅
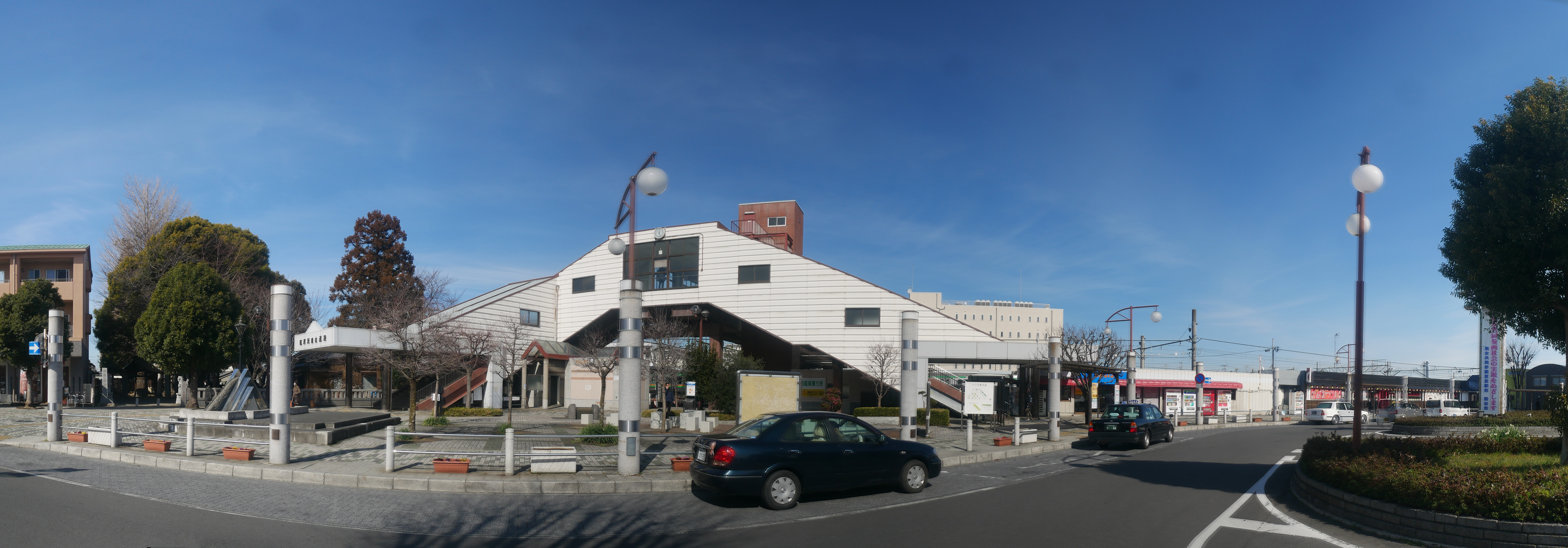
- South entrance of Kagohara Station, 2020

General information
- Location: 713 Niibori, Kumagaya-shi, Saitama-ken 360-0841; Japan
- Coordinates: 36.1743°N 139.3304°E
- Operator: JR East
- Line: ■ Takasaki Line
- Distance: 41.0 km from Ōmiya
- Platforms: 2 island platforms

Other information
- Status: Staffed (Midori no Madoguchi )
- Website: Official website

History
- Opened: 16 December 1909

Passengers
- FY2019: 14,920 daily

Services
Preceding station	JR East	Following station
Fukaya towards Takasaki	Takasaki Line Rapid Urban	Kumagaya One-way operation
Fukaya towards Maebashi	Takasaki Line Local	Kumagaya towards Tokyo
Fukaya towards Takasaki	Shōnan–Shinjuku Line Special Rapid	Kumagaya towards Odawara
Fukaya towards Maebashi	Shōnan–Shinjuku Line Rapid	Kumagaya towards Odawara
Location
- Location within Saitama Prefecture Location within Japan

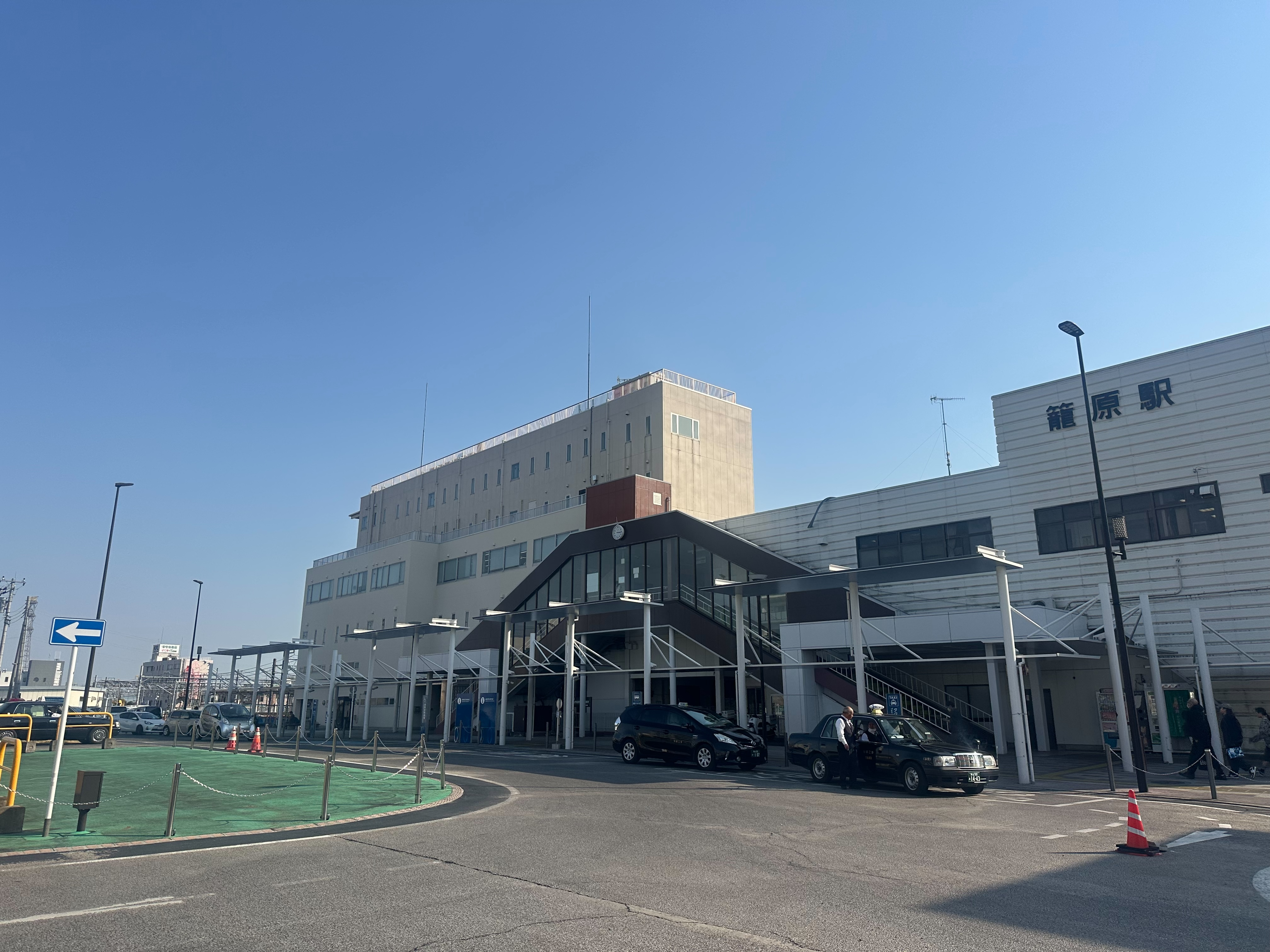
North exit, 2025

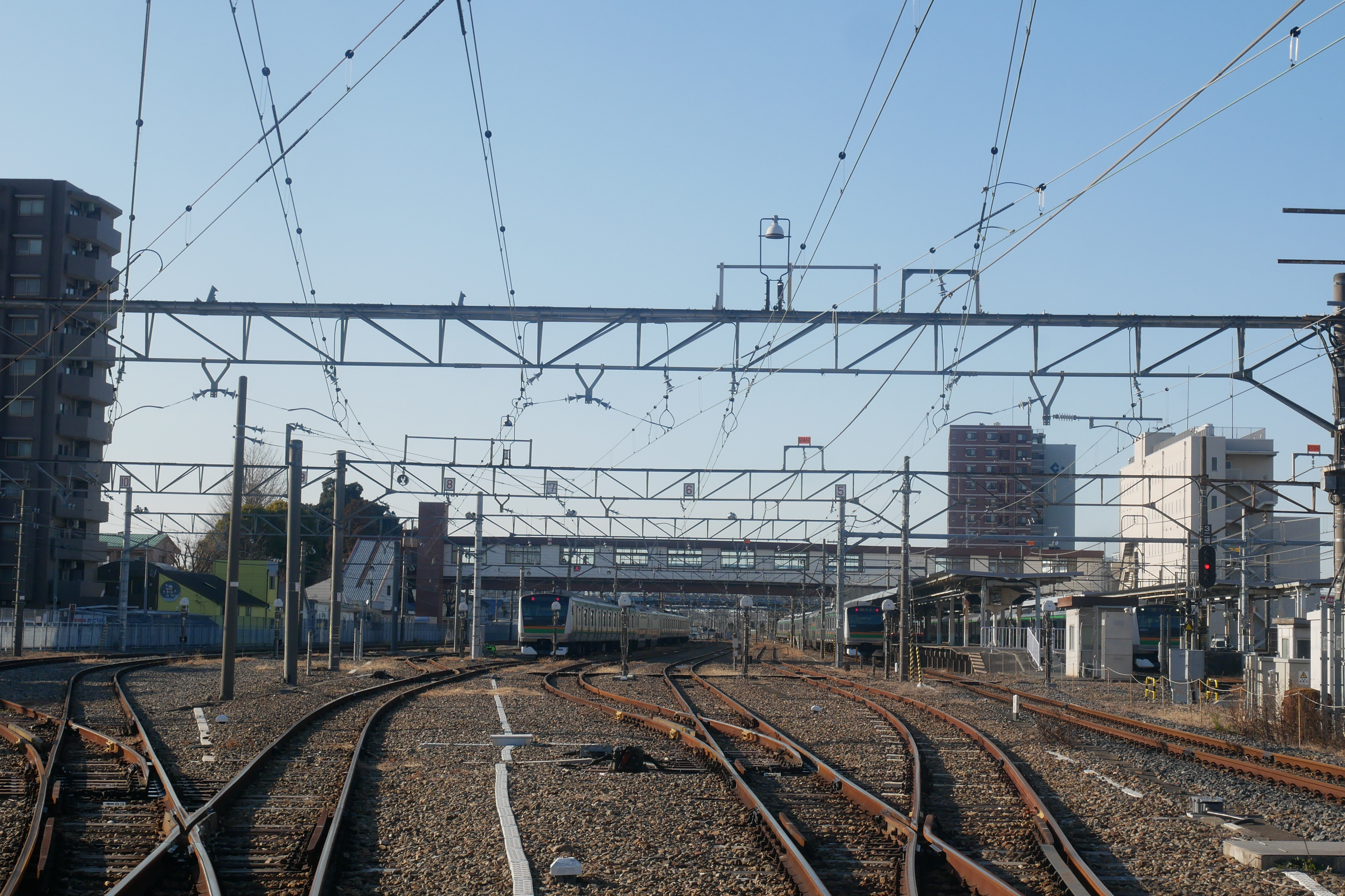
Station platforms, tracks, and trains, 2020

Kagohara Station (籠原駅, Kagohara-eki) is a passenger railway station located in the Niibori neighborhood of the city of Kumagaya, Saitama Prefecture, Japan, operated by the East Japan Railway Company (JR East).

== Lines ==
Kagohara Station is served by the Takasaki Line, with through Shōnan-Shinjuku Line and Ueno-Tokyo Line services to and from the Tōkaidō Line. It is 41.0 kilometers from the nominal starting point of the Takasaki Line at Ōmiya.

== Station layout ==
The station has two island platform serving four tracks, with an elevated station building located above the platforms. The station has a "Midori no Madoguchi" staffed ticket office.

=== Platforms ===
1,2	■ Takasaki Line (Ueno-Tokyo Line)	for Ōmiya, Ueno, Tokyo, Yokohama, Atami, Numazu and Itō (via Tōkaidō Line and Ito Line)
1,2	■ Shōnan-Shinjuku Line	for Ōmiya, Shinjuku, Yokohama, Ōfuna, and Odawara (via Tōkaidō Line)
3,4	■ Takasaki Line	for Honjō, Takasaki, and Maebashi

- Platforms 2 and 4 serve as side tracks for terminating trains.

== History ==
Kagohara Station opened on 16 December 1909. The station became part of the JR East network after the privatization of the JNR on 1 April 1987.

== Passenger statistics ==
In fiscal 2019, the station was used by an average of 14,920 passengers daily (boarding passengers only).

== Surrounding area ==
- JASDF Kumagaya Airbase
- Kumagaya Industrial Park
- Kumagaya-Nishi High School

== See also ==
- List of railway stations in Japan
