= Kita-Fujioka Station =

Railway station in Fujioka, Gunma Prefecture, Japan

Kita-Fujioka Station 北藤岡駅
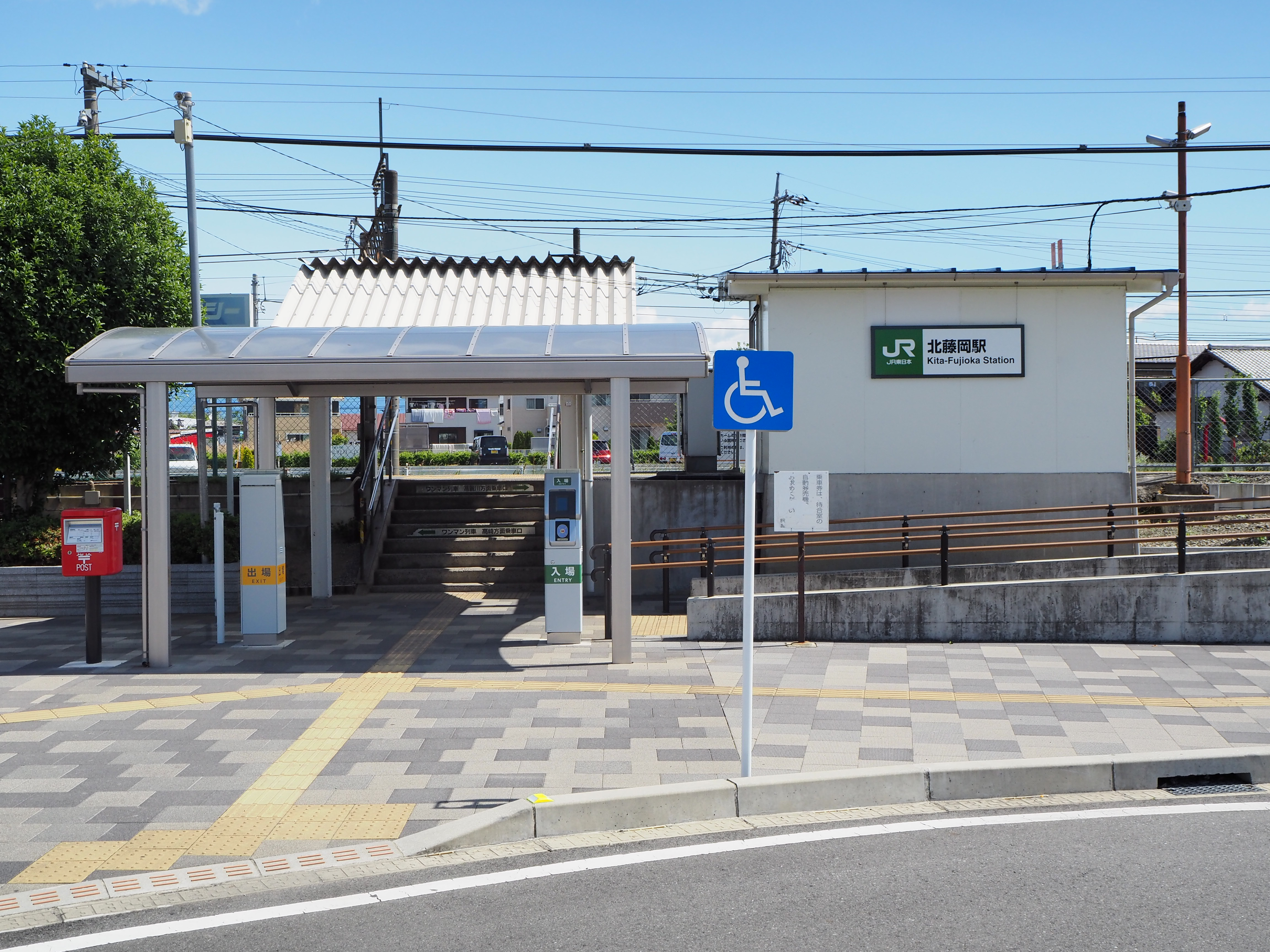
- Station entrance, June 2017

General information
- Location: Tatsuishi, Fujioka-shi, Gunma-ken 375–0002; Japan
- Coordinates: 36°16′56″N 139°04′53″E
- Operator: JR East
- Line: ■ Hachikō Line
- Distance: 88.4 km from Hachiōji
- Platforms: 1 side platform
- Tracks: 1

Other information
- Status: Unstaffed
- Website: Official website

History
- Opened: 21 February 1961

Passengers
- FY2013: 343

Services
Preceding station	JR East	Following station
Kuragano towards Takasaki	Hachikō Line	Gunma-Fujioka towards Komagawa
Location
- Location within Gunma Prefecture Location within Japan

Kita-Fujioka Station (北藤岡駅, Kita-Fujioka-eki) is a railway station in the city of Fujioka, Gunma, Japan, operated by East Japan Railway Company (JR East).

== Lines ==
Kita-Fujioka Station is served by the Hachikō Line between Komagawa and Takasaki. It is located 88.4 kilometers from the starting point of the line at Hachiōji and 57.3 kilometers from Komagawa.

== Station layout ==
The station consists of one side platform serving a single track. This station is treated as a junction of the Takasaki Line, with the Hachikō Line and Takasaki Line using the same double tracks between Kita-Fujioka and Kuragano. The station is unattended.

== History ==
The station opened on 21 February 1961. With the privatization of the Japanese National Railways (JNR) on 1 April 1987, the station came under the control of JR East. The station became Suica-compatible from February 2002.

== Passenger statistics ==
In fiscal 2013, the station was used by an average of 343 passengers daily (boarding passengers only).

== Surrounding area ==
The station is located in a residential area in the northern part of Fujioka City and has a relatively large number of passengers for an unstaffed station.

== See also ==
- List of railway stations in Japan
