= Oku Station (Tokyo) =

Railway station in Tokyo, Japan

Coordinates: 35°44′48″N 139°45′14″E

JU03 Oku Station 尾久駅
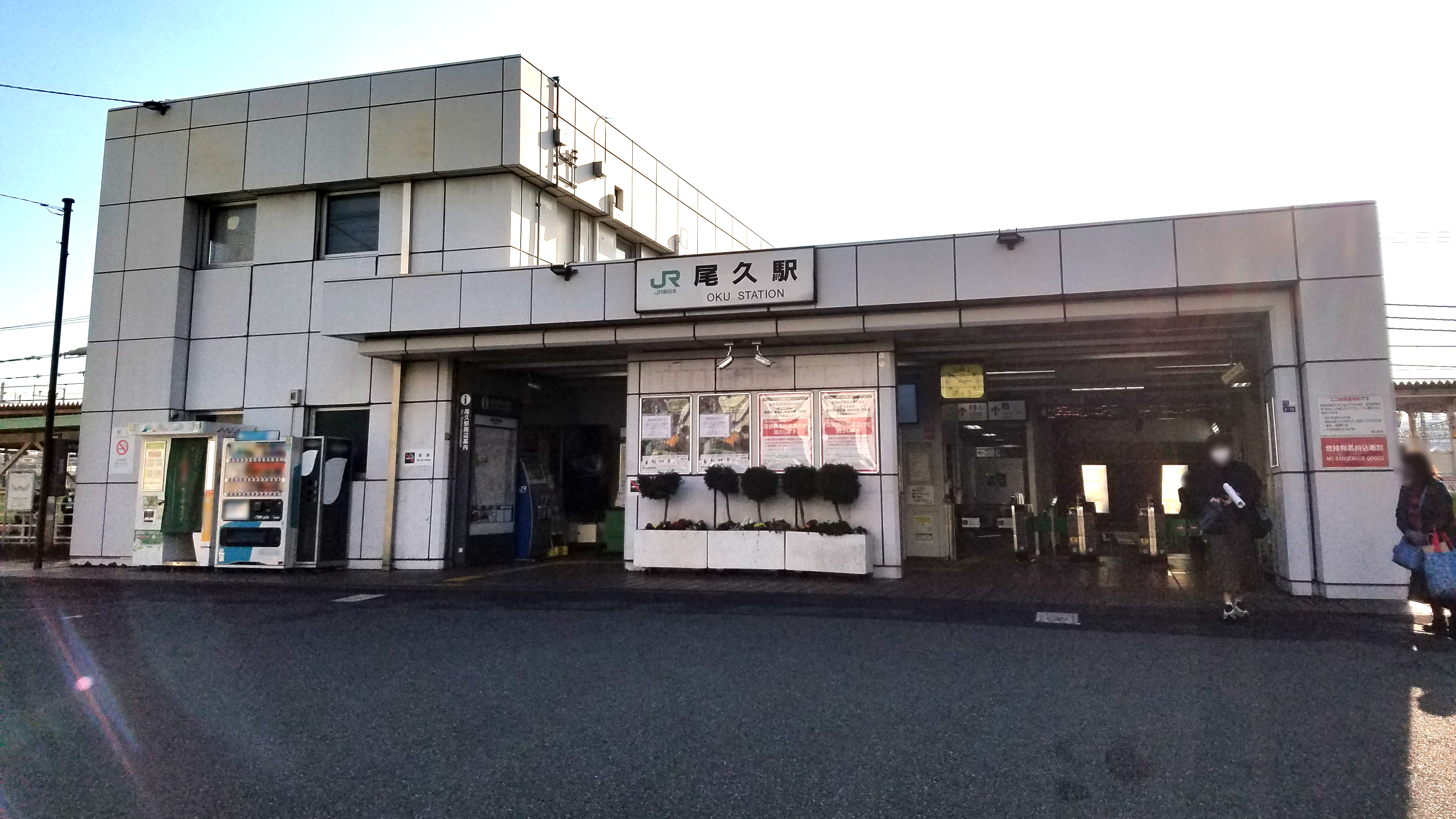
- The station building in February 2021

General information
- Location: 1 Shōwamachi, Kita-ku, Tokyo; Japan
- Operator: JR East
- Line: Tōhoku Main Line
- Platforms: 1 island platform
- Tracks: 2

History
- Opened: 1929

Passengers
- FY2021: 8,780 daily

Services
Preceding station	JR East	Following station
Ueno towards Tokyo	Utsunomiya / Takasaki lines Local	Akabane towards Kuroiso or Maebashi
Location

Oku Station (尾久駅, Oku-eki) is a railway station in Tokyo, Japan, operated by East Japan Railway Company (JR East).

== Lines ==
Oku Station is served by the following lines.

- Utsunomiya Line (Tōhoku Main Line)
- Takasaki Line

== Station layout ==
The station is composed of a single island platform serving two tracks.

=== Platforms ===
1	Utsunomiya Line	for Ueno and Tokyo; Tōkaidō Line (via Ueno-Tokyo Line) for Shinagawa, Yokohama, Ofuna, Odawara, Atami, and Numazu
1	Takasaki Line	for Ueno and Tokyo; Tōkaidō Line (via Ueno-Tokyo Line) for Shinagawa, Yokohama, Ofuna, Odawara, and Atami
2	Utsunomiya Line	for Ōmiya, Oyama, Utsunomiya, and Kuroiso
2	Takasaki Line	for Ōmiya, Kumagaya, Takasaki, and Maebashi

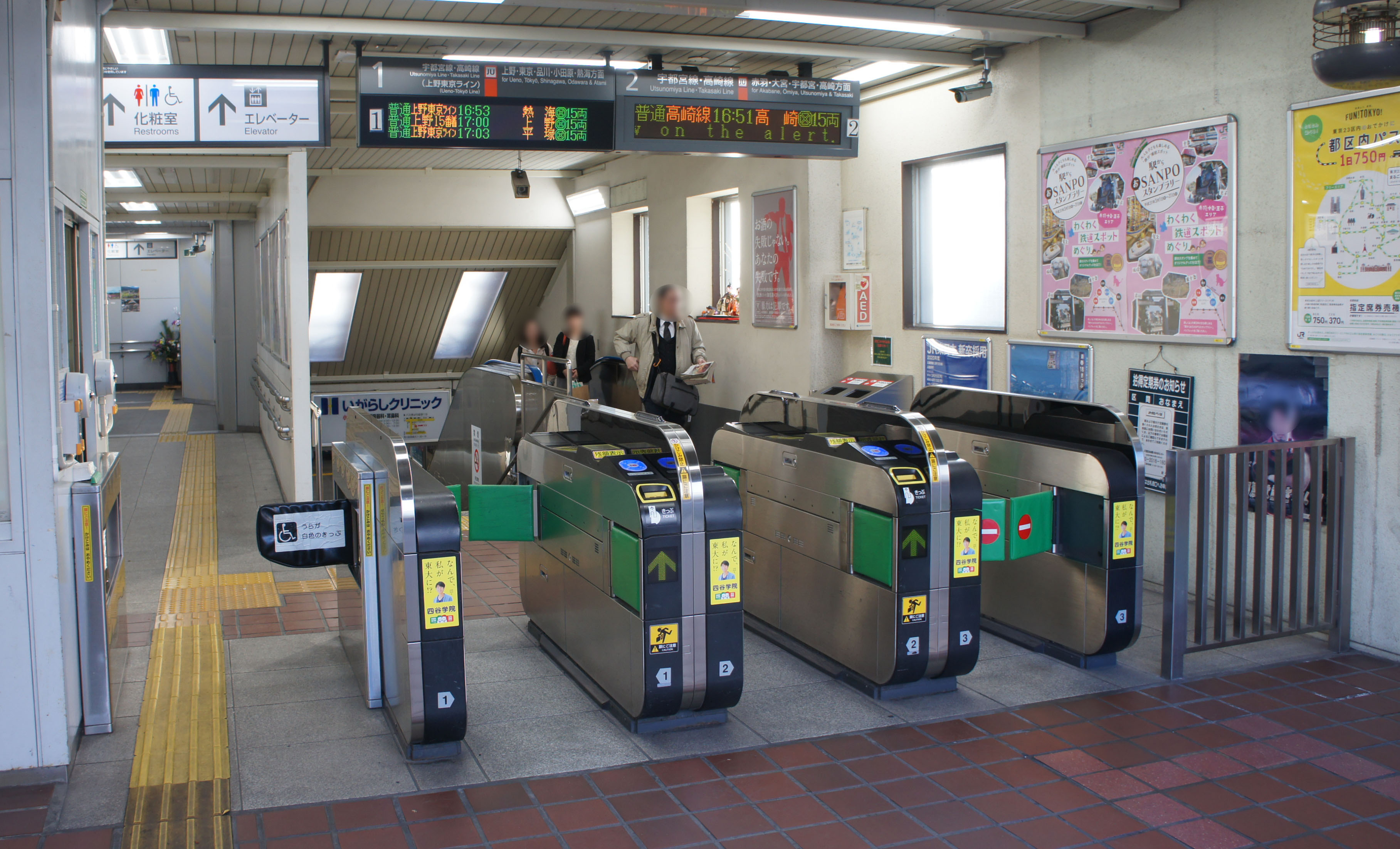
The ticket gate, March 2019

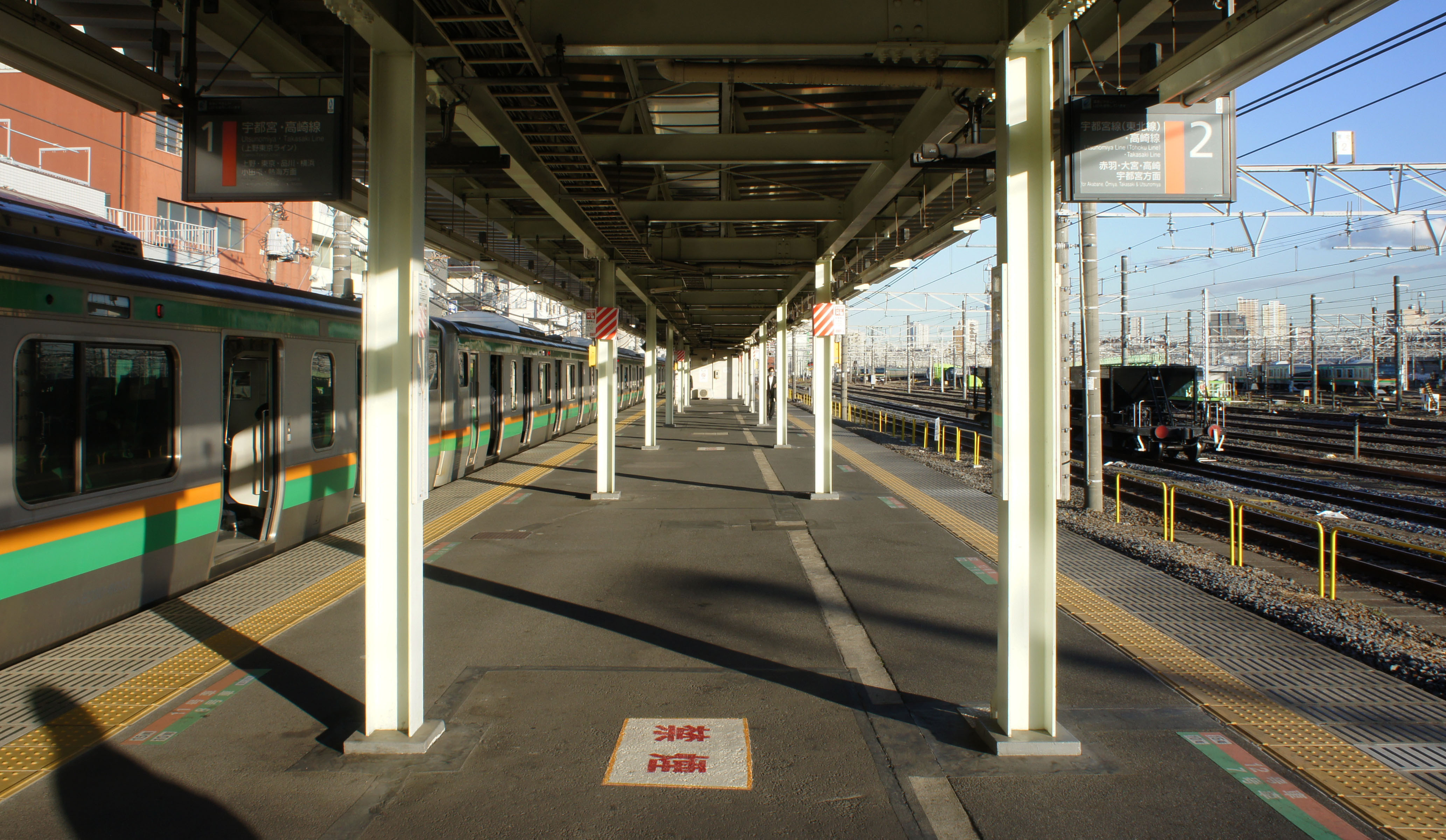
The station platforms, March 2019

== History ==
Oku Station opened on 20 June 1929.

== Surrounding area ==
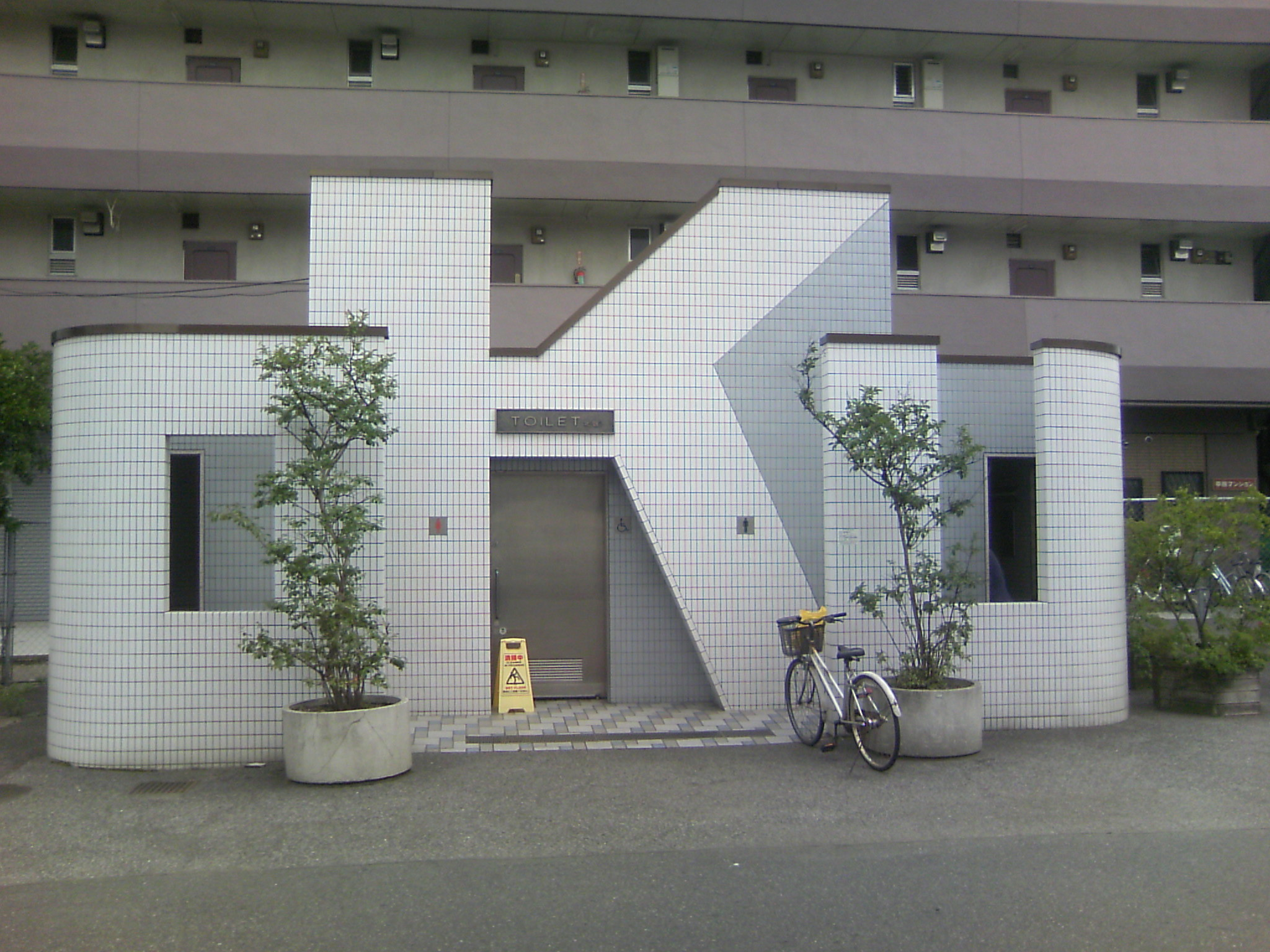
Public toilet located outside of Oku Station stylized to look like "OKU" in uppercase, July 2007

Oku Station is located north of various train stabling tracks for the Tohoku Main Line and Tōhoku Shinkansen. It is also close to:

- Oku Vehicle Center
- Arakawa-shakomae on the Toden Arakawa Line
- Meiji Street
