= Okabe Station =

Railway station in Fukaya, Saitama Prefecture, Japan

Okabe Station 岡部駅
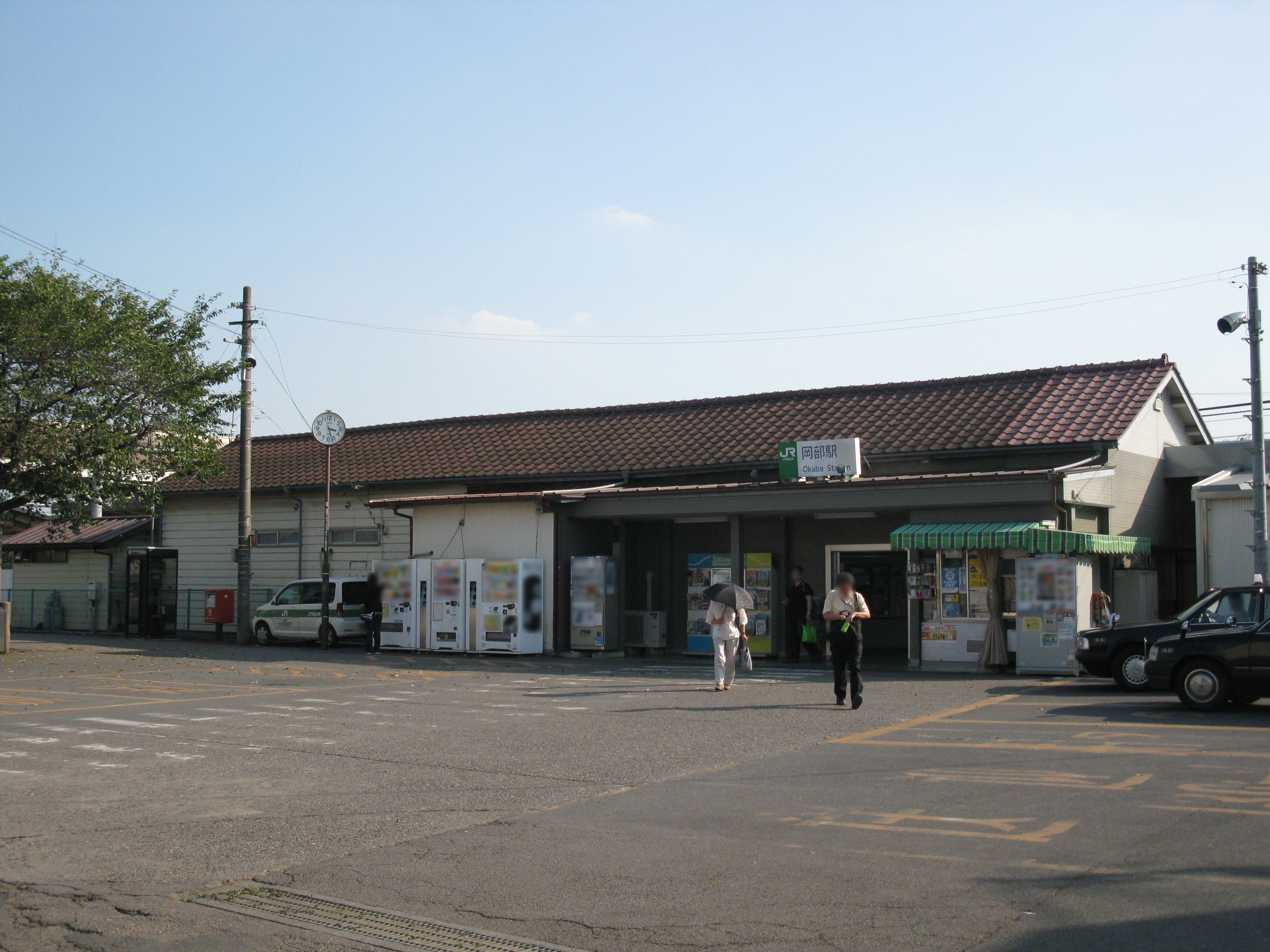
- the entrance of Okabe Station, September 2010

General information
- Location: 2661-3 Oka, Fukaya-shi, Saitama-ken 369-0201; Japan
- Coordinates: 36.2057°N 139.2377°E
- Operator: JR East; JR Freight
- Line: ■ Takasaki Line
- Distance: 50.1 km from Ōmiya.
- Platforms: 2 island platforms

Other information
- Status: Staffed
- Website: Official website

History
- Opened: 16 December 1909

Passengers
- FY2019: 3183 daily

Services
Preceding station	JR East	Following station
Honjō towards Takasaki	Takasaki Line Rapid Urban	Fukaya One-way operation
Honjō towards Maebashi	Takasaki Line Local	Fukaya towards Tokyo
Honjō towards Takasaki	Shōnan–Shinjuku Line Special Rapid	Fukaya towards Odawara
Honjō towards Maebashi	Shōnan–Shinjuku Line Rapid	Fukaya towards Odawara
Location
- Location within Saitama Prefecture Location within Japan

Okabe Station (岡部駅, Okabe-eki) is a passenger railway station located in the city of Fukaya, Saitama, Japan, operated by the East Japan Railway Company (JR East). It is also a freight depot for the Japan Freight Railway Company (JR Freight).

== Lines ==
Okabe Station is served by the Takasaki Line, with through Shōnan-Shinjuku Line and Ueno-Tokyo Line services to and from the Tokaido Line. It is 50.1 kilometers from the nominal starting point of the Takasaki Line at Ōmiya.

== Layout ==
The station consists of two island platforms serving four tracks, connected to the station building by an underground passage. The station is staffed.

=== Platforms ===
1,2	■ Takasaki Line (Ueno-Tokyo Line)	for Ōmiya, Ueno, Tokyo, Yokohama, Atami, Numazu and Ito (via Tokaido Line and Ito Line)
1,2	■ Shōnan-Shinjuku Line	for Ōmiya, Shinjuku, Yokohama, Ōfuna, and Odawara (via Tokaido Line)
3,4	■ Takasaki Line	for Honjō, Takasaki, and Maebashi

- Platforms 2 and 4 serve as side tracks for terminating trains.

== History ==
The station opened on 16 December 1909. The station became part of the JR East network after the privatization of the JNR on 1 April 1987.

== Passenger statistics ==
In fiscal 2019, the station was used by an average of 3183 passengers daily (boarding passengers only).

== Surrounding area ==
- former Okabe Town Hall
- Okabe Post Office
- Saitama Institute of Technology

== See also ==
- List of railway stations in Japan
