= Hongō Haniwa Kiln Site =

Hongō Haniwa Kiln ruins
- 本郷埴輪窯跡 (Japanese)
- Hongō Haniwa Kiln ruins Hongō Haniwa Kiln Site (Japan)
- 36°13′46″N 139°04′47″E
- Type: ancient kiln
- Periods: Kofun period
- Location: Fujioka, Gunma, Japan
- Region: Kantō region

History
- Built: late 5th century

Site notes
- Public access: Yes (no facilities)

The Hongō Haniwa Kiln ruins (本郷埴輪窯跡, Hongō haniwa kama ato) is an archaeological site with the ruins of an ancient Kofun period kiln located in what is now the Hongō neighborhood of the city of Fujioka, Gunma Prefecture in the northern Kantō region of Japan. It was designated a National Historic Site of Japan in 1944.

== Overview ==
The Hongō Haniwa Kiln was located is located on the slope of a river terrace facing the Kanna River on the south side of modern Fujioka. This area was inhabited by the "Hajibe", a caste of potters who traditionally produced Haji ware earthenware and haniwa, and there is a Shinto shrine nearby dedicated to the ancestors of the Hajibe clan. The existence of the kiln was confirmed in 1911, but an academic archaeological excavation was not made until 1943. At that time, more than a dozen kilns ruins were found at intervals of four meters along the terraced cliffs, of which two were excavated in detail. These were found to be a type of noborigama kiln, utilizing the natural slope of the hill, with a total length of ten meters. The kiln is divided into a trumpet-shaped six-meter ventilation path and a 2-meter combustion section, which was cylindrical and which had an inclination of about 30 degrees. The walls and floors were lined with clay. In front of the kiln area were the shards of many haniwa, including horse-shaped versions. It is estimated that these kilns date from the 6th century to the early 7th century, and supplied haniwa for use in kofun burial mounds across a wide region of the Kantō area.

The site was backfilled after excavation and is covered in forest, It is about 30 minutes walk from Gunma-Fujioka Station on the JR East Hachikō Line.

== See also ==
- List of Historic Sites of Japan (Gunma)
