= Honjō-Waseda Station =

Railway station in Honjō, Saitama Prefecture, Japan

Honjō-Waseda Station 本庄早稲田駅
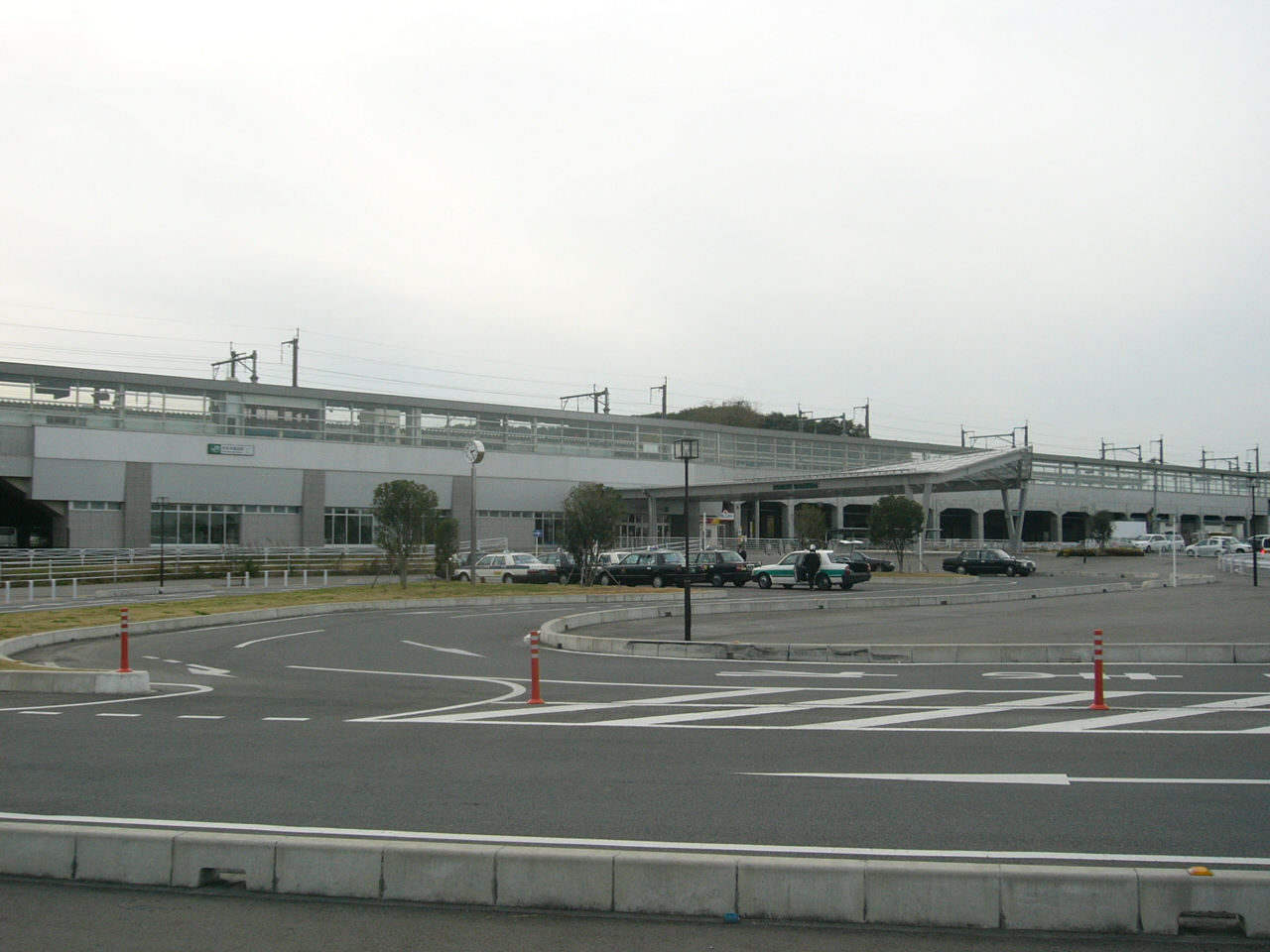
- Honjō-Waseda Station north side, November 2006

Japanese name
- Shinjitai: 本庄早稲田駅
- Kyūjitai: 本庄早稻田驛
- Hiragana: ほんじょうわせだえき

General information
- Location: Kitabori, Honjō City, Saitama Prefecture 367-0031; Japan
- Coordinates: 36.218873°N 139.179703°E
- Operator: JR East
- Lines: Jōetsu Shinkansen; Hokuriku Shinkansen
- Distance: 86.0 km (53.4 mi) from Tokyo
- Platforms: 2 side platforms
- Tracks: 2

Construction
- Structure type: Elevated

Other information
- Status: Staffed (Midori no Madoguchi )
- Website: Official website

History
- Opened: 13 March 2004; 22 years ago

Passengers
- FY2019: 2,233 daily (boarding)

Services
Preceding station	JR East	Following station
Takasaki towards Niigata	Jōetsu Shinkansen Toki	Kumagaya towards Tokyo
Takasaki towards Gala-Yuzawa	Jōetsu Shinkansen Tanigawa	Kumagaya towards Tokyo
Takasaki towards Nagano	Hokuriku Shinkansen Asama	Kumagaya towards Tokyo
Location
- Location within Saitama Prefecture Location within Kanto Area Location within Japan

Honjō-Waseda Station (本庄早稲田駅, Honjō-Waseda-eki) is a passenger Shinkansen railway station located in the city of Honjō, Saitama, Japan, operated by East Japan Railway Company (JR East).

== Lines ==
Honjō-Waseda Station is located on the Joetsu Shinkansen high-speed line between Tokyo and Niigata in Niigata Prefecture, and is also served by Hokuriku Shinkansen trains between Tokyo and Kanazawa in Ishikawa Prefecture. It is 55.7 kilometers from Ōmiya and 86.0 km from Tokyo.

== Station layout ==
The elevated station has two side platforms serving two tracks for stopping trains, with two centre tracks for non-stop trains. The station has a "Midori no Madoguchi" staffed ticket office.

=== Platforms ===
1	■ Joetsu Shinkansen	for Echigo-Yuzawa, Nagaoka, and Niigata
1	■ Hokuriku Shinkansen	for Nagano, Toyama, and Kanazawa
2	■ Joetsu Shinkansen	for Omiya and Tokyo

== History ==
Honjō-Waseda Station opened on 13 March 2004.

== Passenger statistics ==
In fiscal 2019, the station was used by an average of 2233 passengers daily (boarding passengers only). The passenger figures for previous years are as shown below.

Fiscal year	Daily average
2004	1,671
2005	1,924
2010	2,010
2015	2,144

== Bus routes ==
- Musashi Kanko
  - For Honjō Station
  - For Yorii Station
- Kokusai Juo Bus
  - For Honjō Station
  - For Isesaki Station

== See also ==
- List of railway stations in Japan
