= Minakami =

Minakami may refer to:

- Minakami, Gunma, a town in Gunma Prefecture, Japan
- Minakami Station, a railway station in Gunma Prefecture, Japan
- Minakami (train), a train service running in Japan
- Takitarō Minakami (1887–1940), a Japanese novelist
- Tsutomu Minakami (1919–2004), a Japanese author
- Minakami Houdaigi, a ski resort in Gunma Prefecture, Japan
