= Jimbohara Station =

Railway station in Kamisato, Saitama Prefecture, Japan

Jimbohara Station 神保原駅
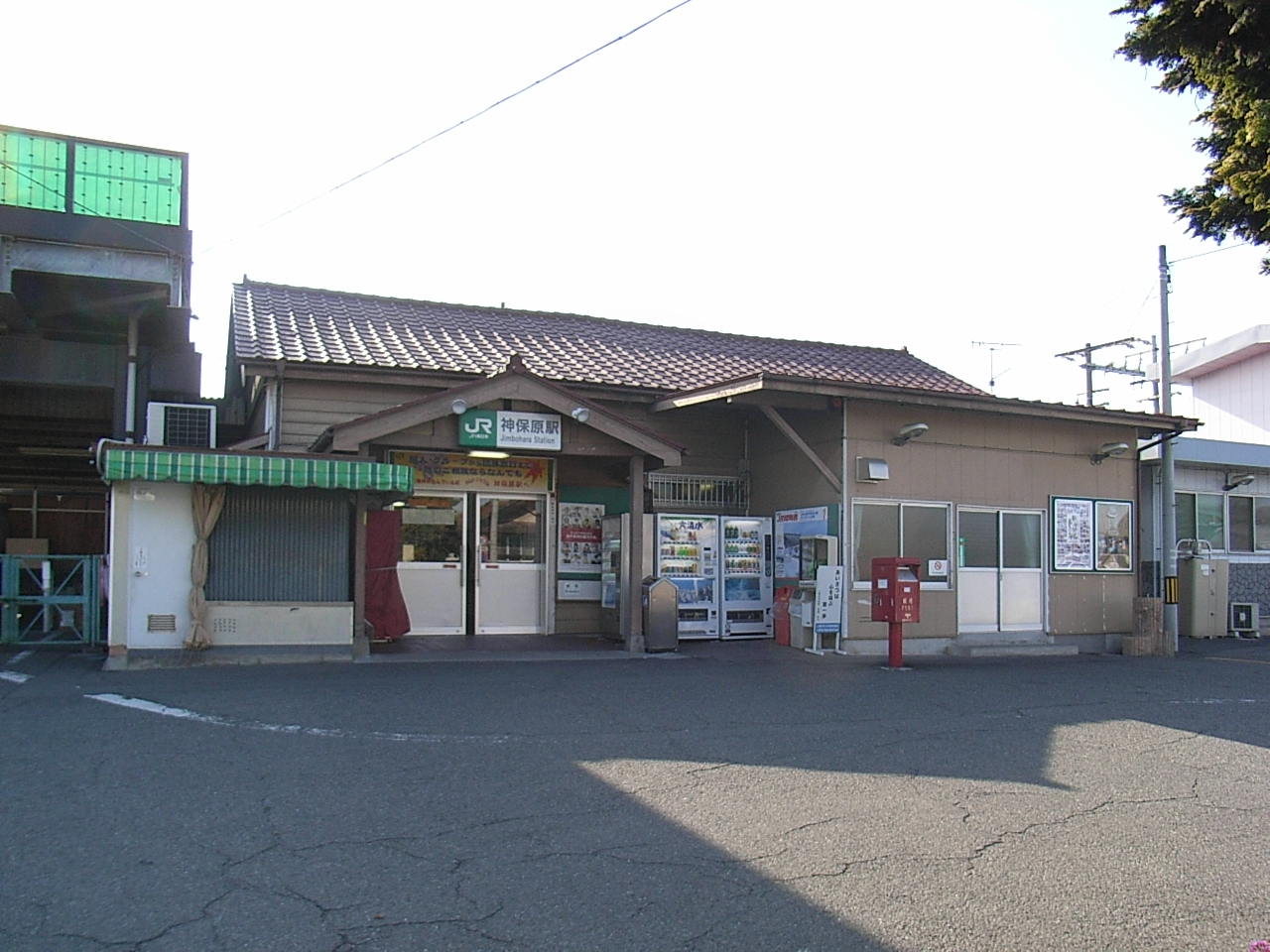
- entrance of Jimbohara Station

General information
- Location: 267-5 Jimmbohara Kamisato-machi, Kodama-gun, Saitama-ken 369-0305; Japan
- Coordinates: 36.2538°N 139.1489°E
- Operator: JR East
- Line: ■ Takasaki Line
- Distance: 59.7 km from Ōmiya
- Platforms: 1 island + 1 side platform

Other information
- Status: Staffed
- Website: Official website

History
- Opened: 15 November 1897

Passengers
- FY2019: 2799 daily

Services
Preceding station	JR East	Following station
Shinmachi towards Takasaki	Takasaki Line Rapid Urban	Honjō One-way operation
Shinmachi towards Maebashi	Takasaki Line Local	Honjō towards Tokyo
Shinmachi towards Takasaki	Shōnan–Shinjuku Line Special Rapid	Honjō towards Odawara
Shinmachi towards Maebashi	Shōnan–Shinjuku Line Rapid	Honjō towards Odawara
Location
- Location within Saitama Prefecture Location within Japan

Jimbohara Station (神保原駅, Jimbohara-eki) is a passenger railway station located in the town of Kamisato, Saitama, Japan, operated by the East Japan Railway Company (JR East).

== Lines ==
Jimbohara Station is served by the Takasaki Line, with through Shōnan-Shinjuku Line and Ueno-Tokyo Line services to and from the Tōkaidō Main Line. It is 59.7 kilometers from the nominal starting point of the Takasaki Line at Ōmiya.

== Layout ==
The station has one side platform and one island platform serving three tracks, connected by a footbridge, with a single-story station building. The station is staffed.

=== Platforms ===
1,2	■ Takasaki Line (Ueno-Tokyo Line)	for Ōmiya, Ueno, Tokyo, Yokohama, Atami, Numazu and Itō (via Tōkaidō Main Line and Itō Line)
1,2	■ Shōnan-Shinjuku Line	for Ōmiya, Shinjuku, Yokohama, Ōfuna, and Odawara (via Tokaido Line)
2,3	■ Takasaki Line	for Takasaki, and Maebashi

== History ==
Jimbohara Station opened on 15 November 1897. The station became part of the JR East network after the privatization of the JNR on 1 April 1987.

== Passenger statistics ==
In fiscal 2019, the station was used by an average of 2799 passengers daily (boarding passengers only).

== Surrounding area ==
- Kamisato Town Hall
- Kamisato Post Office
- National Route 17

== See also ==
- List of railway stations in Japan
