= Shimmachi Station (Gunma) =

Railway station in Takasaki, Gunma Prefecture, Japan

Shimmachi Station 新町駅
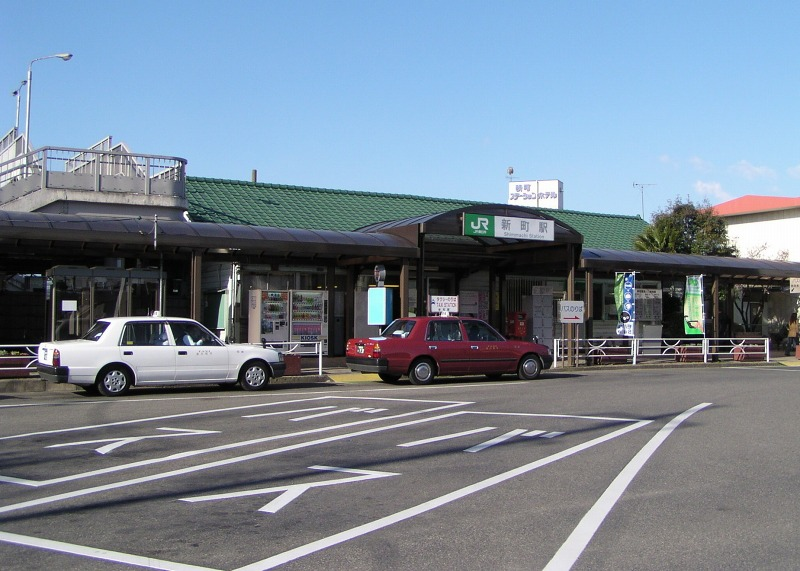
- Shimmachi Station in March 2006

General information
- Location: 2150 Shimmachi, Takasaki-shi, Gunma-ken 370-1301; Japan
- Coordinates: 36.2732°N 139.106°E
- Operator: JR East; JR Freight
- Lines: ■ Takasaki Line; ■ Shonan-Shinjuku Line
- Distance: 64.2 km from Ōmiya
- Platforms: 1 island + side platform

Other information
- Status: Staffed (Midori no Madoguchi )
- Website: Official website

History
- Opened: 27 December 1883.

Passengers
- FY2019: 3728 daily

Services
Preceding station	JR East	Following station
Takasaki Terminus	Akagi	Honjō towards Ueno or Shinjuku
Kuragano towards Takasaki	Takasaki Line Rapid Urban	Jimbohara One-way operation
Kuragano towards Maebashi	Takasaki Line Local	Jimbohara towards Tokyo
Kuragano towards Takasaki	Shōnan–Shinjuku Line Special Rapid	Jimbohara towards Odawara
Kuragano towards Maebashi	Shōnan–Shinjuku Line Rapid	Jimbohara towards Odawara
Location
- Location within Gunma Prefecture Location within Japan

Shimmachi Station (新町駅, Shinmachi-eki) is a railway station in the city of Takasaki, Gunma, Japan, operated by the East Japan Railway Company (JR East), with a freight depot operated by the Japan Freight Railway Company (JR Freight).

== Lines ==
Shimmachi Station is a station on the Takasaki Line, and is located 64.2 kilometers from the starting point of the line at Ōmiya. The station is also used by trains of the Shōnan–Shinjuku Line operating on the same tracks.

== Station layout ==
The station consists of one side platform and one island platform connected to the station building by a footbridge; however, platform 2 is fenced off and not used. The station has a Midori no Madoguchi ticket office.

=== Platforms ===
1	■ Takasaki Line (Ueno-Tokyo Line)	for Ōmiya, Ueno, Tokyo, Yokohama, Atami, Numazu and Ito (via Tokaido Line and Ito Line)
1	■ Shōnan-Shinjuku Line	for Ōmiya, Shinjuku, Yokohama, Ōfuna, and Odawara (via Tokaido Line)
3	■ Takasaki Line	for Takasaki, and Maebashi

== History ==
Shimmachi Station opened on 27 December 1883. Upon the privatization of the Japanese National Railways (JNR) on 1 April 1987, it came under the control of JR East.

== Passenger statistics ==
In fiscal 2019, the station was used by an average of 3728 passengers daily (boarding passengers only).

== Surrounding area ==
- National Route 17
- Shimmachi Post Office
- Former Shimmachi Town Hall

== Bus routes ==
- Nippon Chuo Bus Okutano Line
  - For Uenomura Fureaikan via Kodama Station and Kanna Village Office

== See also ==
- List of railway stations in Japan
