= Gunma-Fujioka Station =

Railway station in Fujioka, Gunma Prefecture, Japan

Gunma-Fujioka Station 群馬藤岡駅
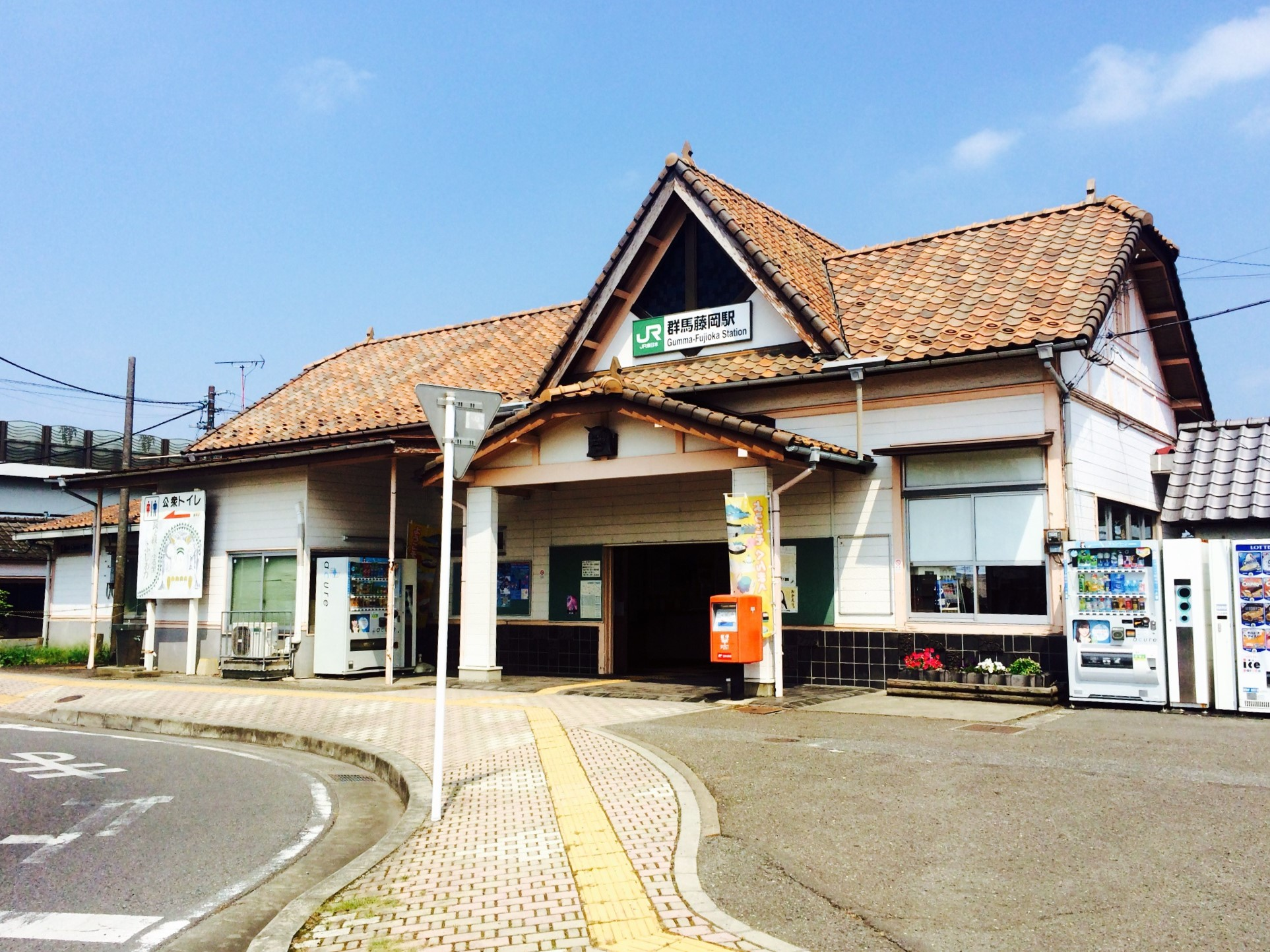
- Gunma-Fujioka Station, August 2016

General information
- Location: Fujioka, Fujioka-shi, Gunma-ken 375–0024; Japan
- Coordinates: 36.2505°N 139.0833°E
- Operator: JR East
- Line: ■ Hachikō Line
- Distance: 84.7 km from Hachiōji
- Platforms: 2 side platforms
- Tracks: 2

Other information
- Status: Staffed
- Website: Official website

History
- Opened: 1 July 1931

Passengers
- FY2019: 1138

Services
Preceding station	JR East	Following station
Kita-Fujioka towards Takasaki	Hachikō Line	Tanshō towards Komagawa
Location
- Location within Gunma Prefecture Location within Japan

Gunma-Fujioka Station (群馬藤岡駅, Gunma-Fujioka-eki) is a railway station in the city of Fujioka, Gunma, Japan, operated by East Japan Railway Company (JR East).

== Lines ==
Gunma-Fujioka Station is served by the Hachikō Line between Komagawa and Takasaki. It is located 84.7 kilometers from the starting point of the line at Hachiōji and 53.6 kilometers from Komagawa.

== Station layout ==
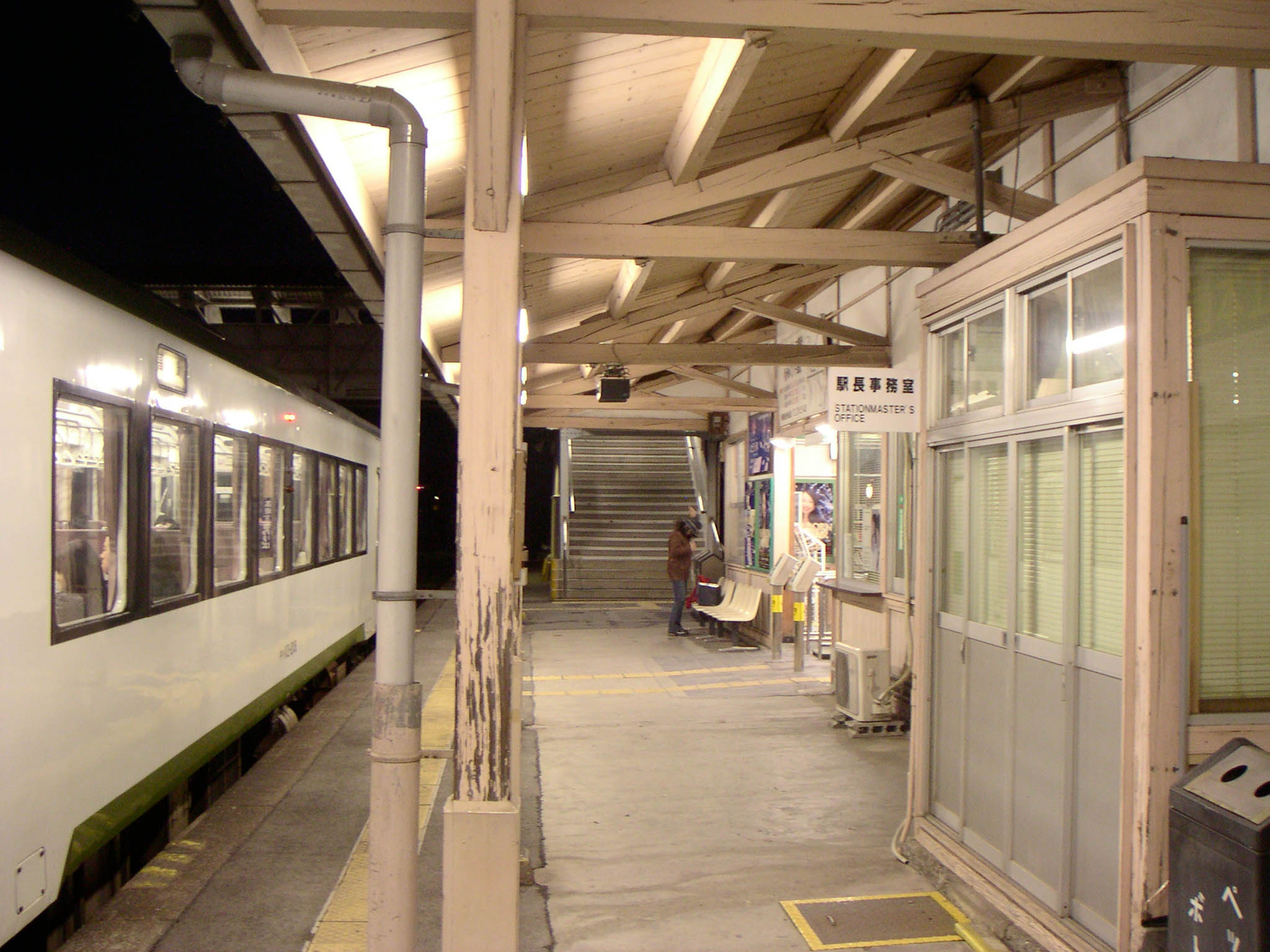
View of the platform

The station consists of two side platforms serving two tracks. The station is attended.

=== Platforms ===
1	■ Hachikō Line	for Kuragano and Takasaki
2	■ Hachikō Line	for Yorii, Ogawamachi, and Komagawa

== History ==
The station opened on 1 July 1931. With the privatization of the Japanese National Railways (JNR) on 1 April 1987, the station came under the control of JR East. The station became Suica-compatible from February 2002.

== Passenger statistics ==
In fiscal 2019, the station was used by an average of 1138 passengers daily (boarding passengers only).

== Surrounding area ==
- Fujioka City Hall
- Fujioka Tax Office

== See also ==
- List of railway stations in Japan
