= Kumagaya Station =

Railway station in Kumagaya, Saitama Prefecture, Japan

CR09 Kumagaya Station 熊谷駅
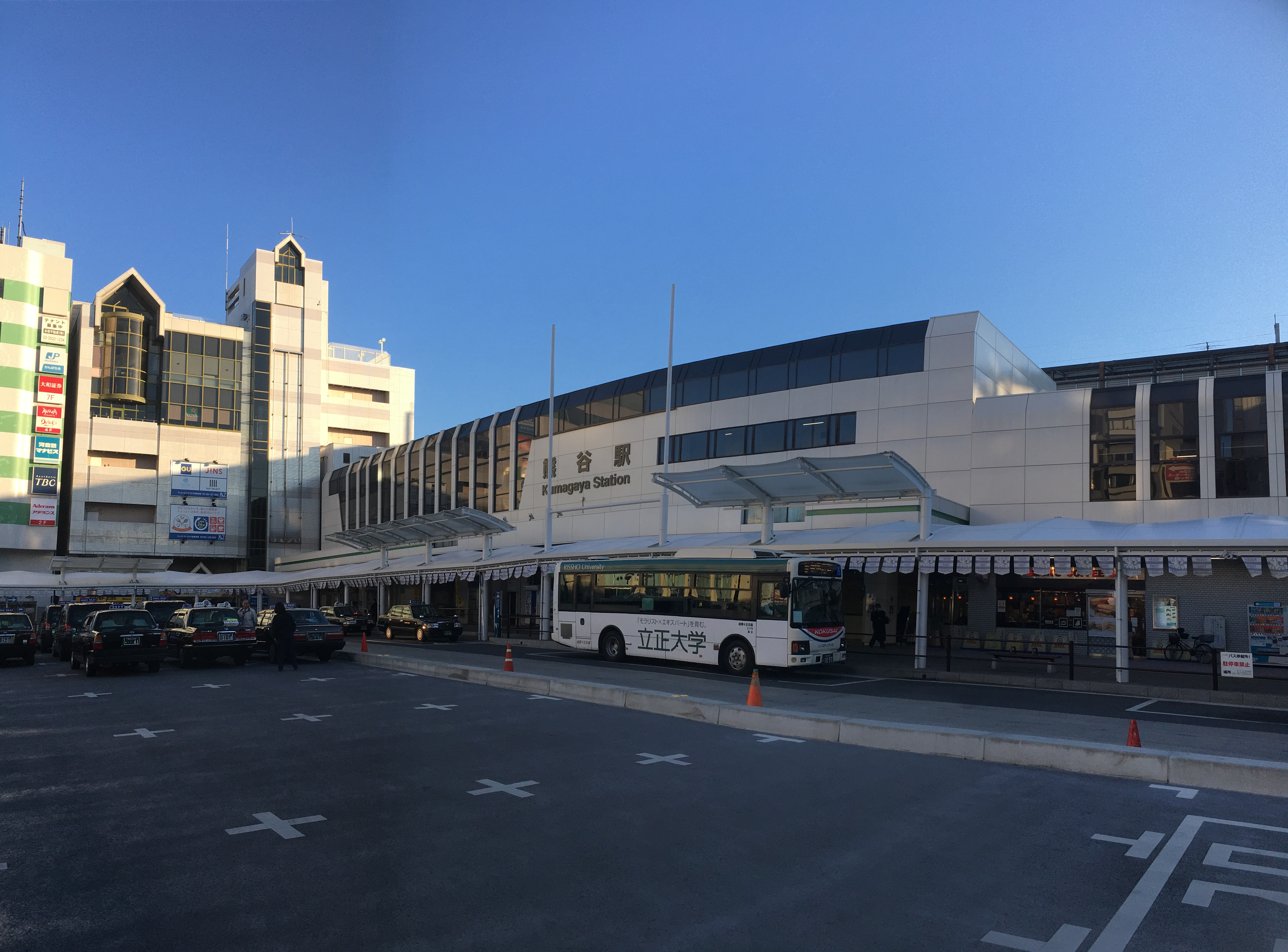
- Kumagaya Station north entrance in February 2021

General information
- Location: 2 Chome-115 Tsukuba, Kumagaya-shi, Saitama-ken 360-0037; 1-202-1 Sakuragi-cho, Kumagaya, Saitama-ken; Japan
- Coordinates: 36°08′24″N 139°23′24″E
- Operator: JR East; Chichibu Railway
- Lines: Jōetsu Shinkansen; Hokuriku Shinkansen; Takasaki Line; ■ Chichibu Main Line
- Distance: 64.7 km (40.2 mi) from Tokyo (JR East); 14.9 km from Hanyū (Chichibu)
- Platforms: 3 island + 1 side platform (JR East); 1 island platform (Chichibu)

History
- Opened: 28 July 1883; 143 years ago

Passengers
- FY2019 (JR East) / FY2018 (Chichibu): 30,064 (JR East); 10,927 (Chichibu)

Services
Preceding station	JR East	Following station
Honjō-Waseda towards Niigata	Jōetsu Shinkansen Toki	Ōmiya towards Tokyo
Honjō-Waseda towards Gala-Yuzawa	Jōetsu Shinkansen Tanigawa	Ōmiya towards Tokyo
Honjō-Waseda towards Nagano	Hokuriku Shinkansen Asama	Ōmiya towards Tokyo
Takasaki towards Naganohara-Kusatsuguchi	Kusatsu	Ōmiya towards Ueno
Fukaya towards Takasaki	Akagi	Kōnosu towards Ueno or Shinjuku
Kagohara towards Takasaki	Takasaki Line Rapid Urban	Kōnosu One-way operation
Kagohara towards Maebashi	Takasaki Line Local	Gyōda towards Tokyo
Kagohara towards Takasaki	Shōnan–Shinjuku Line Special Rapid	Kōnosu towards Odawara
Kagohara towards Maebashi	Shōnan–Shinjuku Line Rapid	Gyōda towards Odawara
Preceding station	Chichibu Railway	Following station
Fukaya Hanazono CR19 towards Mitsumineguchi	SL Paleo Express	Terminus
Takekawa CR15 towards Mitsumineguchi	Chichibu Main Line Rapid Chichibuji	Gyōdashi CR06 towards Hanyū
Kami-Kumagaya CR10 towards Mitsumineguchi	Chichibu Main Line Local	Socio Distribution Center CR08 towards Hanyū
Location
- Location within Saitama Prefecture Location within Japan

Kumagaya Station (熊谷駅, Kumagaya-eki) is an interchange passenger railway station located in the city of Kumagaya, Saitama, Japan, operated jointly by East Japan Railway Company (JR East) and the private railway operator Chichibu Railway.

== Lines ==
Kumagaya Station is served by the JR East Jōetsu Shinkansen and Hokuriku Shinkansen high-speed shinkansen lines from Tokyo, the Takasaki Line to Takasaki. It is located 64.7 kilometers from Tokyo. The station is also served by the privately operated Chichibu Main Line from Hanyū to Mitsumineguchi. It is located 14.9 km from Hanyū on the Chichibu Main Line.

== Station layout ==
=== JR East ===
The JR East station consists of two ground-level island platforms, serving four tracks for the Takasaki Line, with an elevated station building above the platforms. Shinkansen services are provided by one side platform and one island platform serving three tracks, located above the station building. The station has a “Midori no Madoguchi” staffed ticket office.

=== Chichibu Railway ===
The Chichibu Railway Station consists of one island platform serving two tracks, with an elevated station building located above the platform.

=== Platforms ===
1,2	■ Takasaki Line (Ueno-Tokyo Line)	for Ōmiya, Ueno, Tokyo, Yokohama, Atami, Numazu and Itō (via Tokaido Line and Itō Line)
1,2	■ Shōnan-Shinjuku Line	for Ōmiya, Shinjuku, Yokohama, Ōfuna, and Odawara (via Tōkaidō Line)
3-4	■ Takasaki Line	for Kagohara, Takasaki, and Maebashi
5	■ Chichibu Main Line	for Gyōdashi and Hanyū
6	■ Chichibu Main Line	for Yorii, Chichibu, and Mitsumineguchi
11	■ Shinkansen	(Not normally used)
12	■ Jōetsu Shinkansen	for Ōmiya, Ueno, and Tokyo
13	■ Jōetsu Shinkansen	for Takasaki, Echigo-Yuzawa, and Niigata
13	■ Hokuriku Shinkansen	for Takasaki, Nagano, Toyama, and Kanazawa

== History ==
The station on the Takasaki Line opened on July 28, 1883. The Chichibu Line platforms opened on October 7, 1901. The Jōetsu Shinkansen platforms opened on November 15, 1982. The station became part of the JR East network after the privatization of the JNR on 1 April 1987.

== Passenger statistics ==
In fiscal 2019, the JR East portion of Kumagaya Station was used by an average of 30,064 passengers daily (boarding passengers only). In fiscal 2018, the Chichibu Railway portion of the station was used by an average of 10,927 passengers daily.

== Surrounding area ==
- Kumagaya City Office
- Kumagaya General Hospital
- National Route 17

== See also ==
- List of railway stations in Japan
