= Kuragano Station =

Railway station in Takasaki, Gunma Prefecture, Japan

Kuragano Station 倉賀野駅
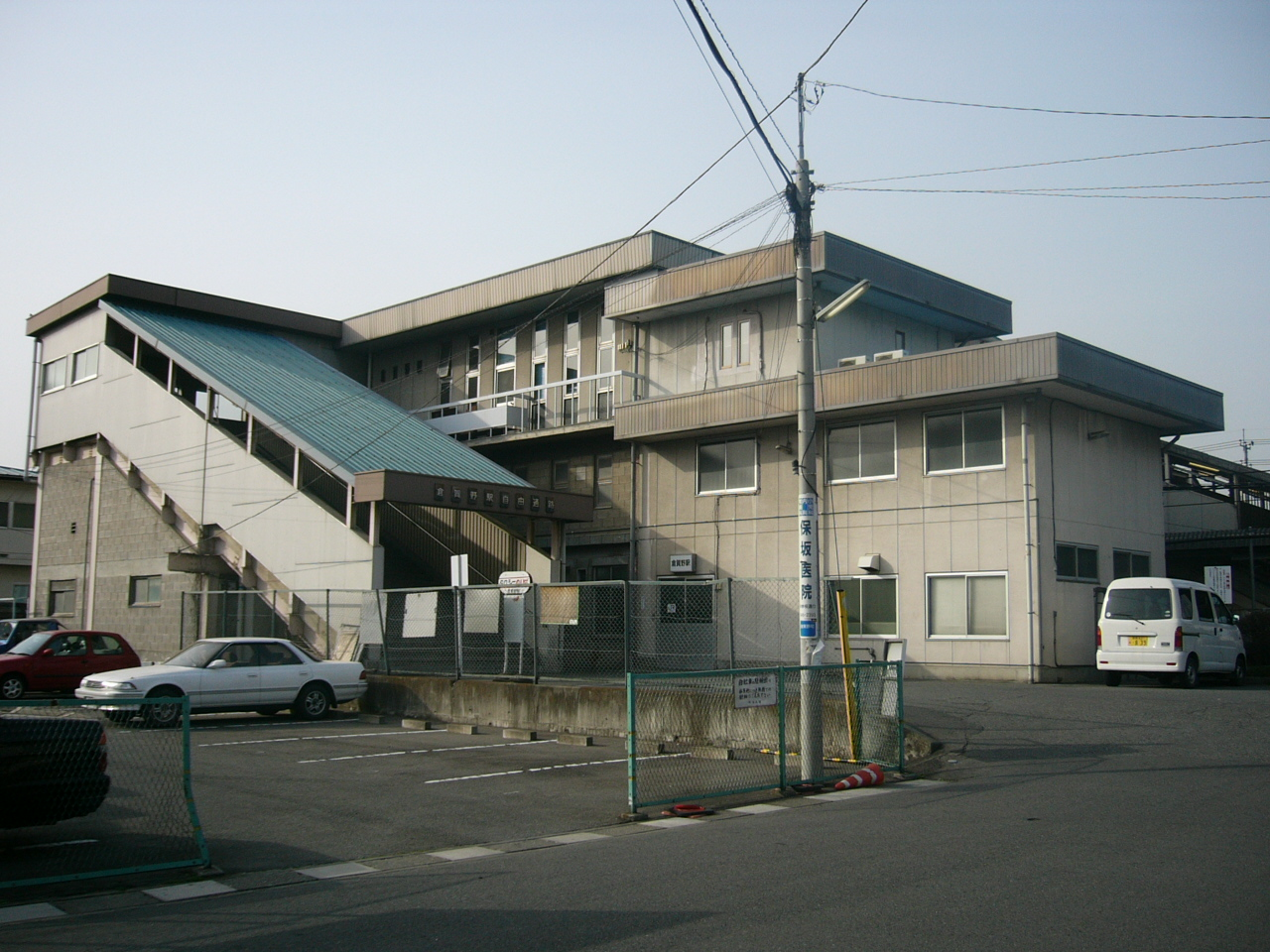
- Station south entrance, April 2006

General information
- Location: Kuragano-machi, Takasaki-shi, Gunma-ken 370–1201; Japan
- Coordinates: 36.3005°N 139.0493°E
- Operator: JR East; JR Freight
- Lines: ■ Takasaki Line; ■ Shonan-Shinjuku Line; ■ Hachikō Line
- Distance: 70.3 km from Ōmiya
- Platforms: 2 island platforms

Other information
- Status: Staffed (Midori no Madoguchi )
- Website: Official website

History
- Opened: 1 May 1894

Passengers
- FY2019: 1861 daily

Services
Preceding station	JR East	Following station
Takasaki Terminus	Takasaki Line Rapid Urban	Shinmachi One-way operation
Takasaki towards Maebashi	Takasaki Line Local	Shinmachi towards Tokyo
Takasaki Terminus	Shōnan–Shinjuku Line Special Rapid	Shinmachi towards Odawara
Takasaki towards Maebashi	Shōnan–Shinjuku Line Rapid	Shinmachi towards Odawara
Takasaki Terminus	Hachikō Line	Kita-Fujioka towards Komagawa
Location
- Location within Gunma Prefecture Location within Japan

Kuragano Station (倉賀野駅, Kuragano-eki) is a railway station in the city of Takasaki, Gunma, Japan, operated by the East Japan Railway Company (JR East), with a freight depot operated by the Japan Freight Railway Company (JR Freight).

== Lines ==
Kuragano Station is a station on the Takasaki Line, and is located 70.3 km from the starting point of the line at Ōmiya. It is also a station on the Hachikō Line, lying 92.0 km from the starting point of the unelectrified northern section of the line at Komagawa. Trains of the Shōnan–Shinjuku Line also stop at this station using the same tracks and platforms as the Takasaki Line.

== Layout ==
The station consists of two island platforms connected to the station building by a footbridge. The station has a Midori no Madoguchi ticket office.

=== Platforms ===
1	■ Takasaki Line	for Takasaki and Maebashi
2	■ Takasaki Line	for Takasaki and Maebashi
3	■ Takasaki Line (Shōnan–Shinjuku Line)	for Ōmiya, Shinjuku, Yokohama, Ōfuna, and Odawara (via Tōkaidō Line)
3	■ Takasaki Line (Ueno-Tōkyō Line)	for Ōmiya, Ueno, Tōkyō, Yokohama, Atami, Numazu and Itō (via Tōkaidō Line and Itō Line)
3	■ Hachikō Line	for Yorii and Komagawa
4	■ Takasaki Line (Shōnan-Shinjuku Line)	for Ōmiya, Shinjuku, Yokohama, Ōfuna, and Odawara (via Tōkaidō Line)
4	■ Takasaki Line (Ueno-Tōkyō Line)	for Ōmiya, Ueno, Tōkyō, Yokohama, Atami, Numazu and Itō (via Tōkaidō Line and Itō Line)
4	■ Hachikō Line	for Yorii and Komagawa

== History ==
The station opened on 1 May 1894. Upon the privatization of the Japanese National Railways (JNR) on 1 April 1987, it came under the control of JR East.

== Passenger statistics ==
In fiscal 2019, the station was used by an average of 1861 passengers daily (boarding passengers only).

== Surrounding area ==
- National Route 17
- Sengenyama Kofun, National Historic Site
- Kuragano Freight Terminal
- Kuragano Post Office

== See also ==
- List of railway stations in Japan
