= Takasaki Line =

Railway line in Japan

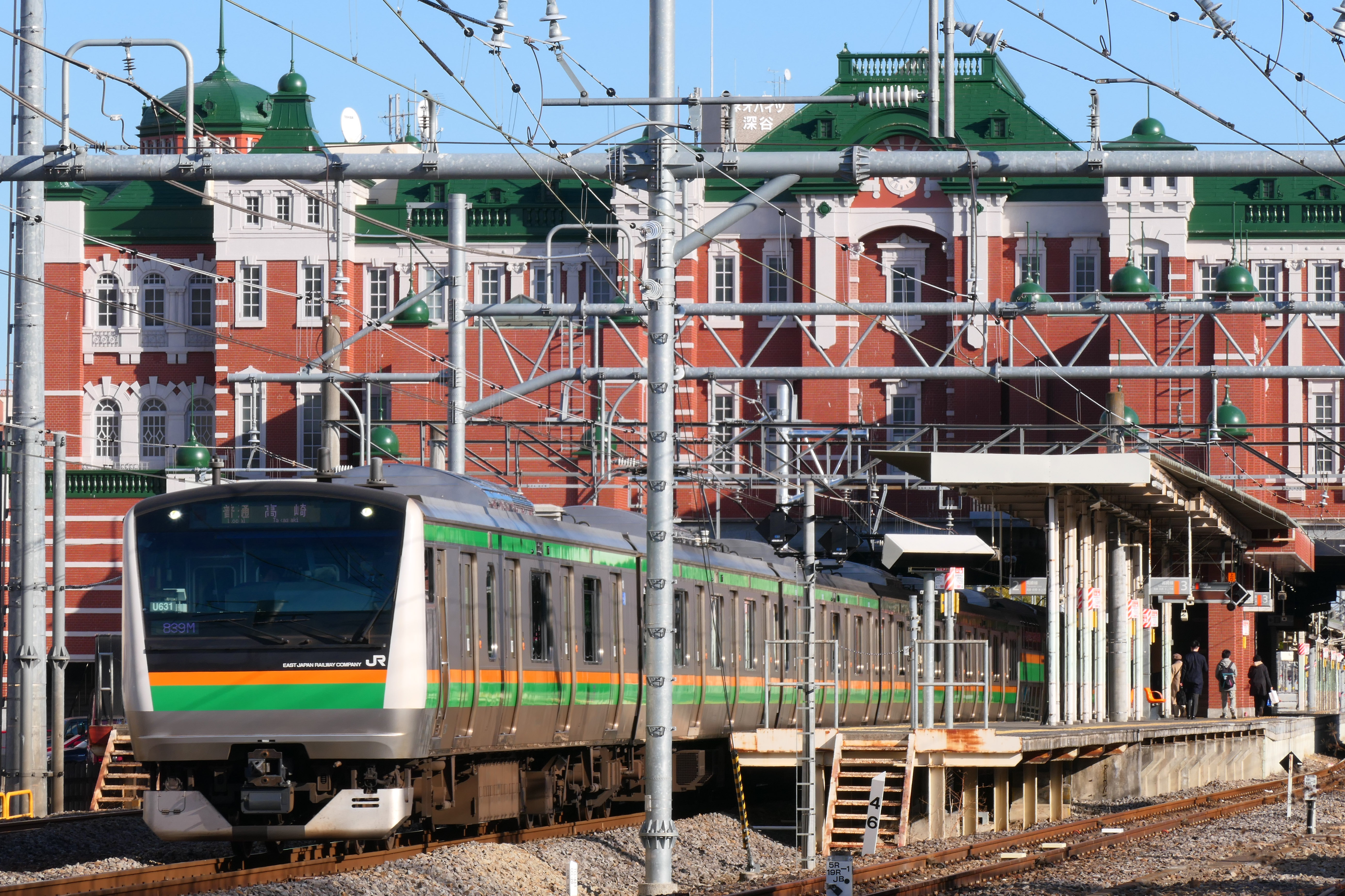
- E233 series EMU departing Fukaya Station on the Takasaki Line

Overview
- Locale: Tokyo, Saitama, Gunma prefectures
- Termini: Ōmiya; Takasaki
- Stations: 19

Service
- Operator(s): JR East

History
- Opened: 28 July 1883; 142 years ago

Technical
- Line length: 74.7 km (46.4 mi)
- Track gauge: 1,067 mm (3 ft 6 in)
- Electrification: 1,500 V DC (overhead catenary)
- Operating speed: 120 km/h (75 mph)
Route map

The Takasaki Line (Japanese: 高崎線, romanized: Takasaki-sen) is a Japanese railway line which connects Ōmiya Station in Saitama, Saitama Prefecture and Takasaki Station in Takasaki, Gunma Prefecture. It is owned and operated by the East Japan Railway Company (JR East).

All services on the line (excluding through Shonan-Shinjuku Line trains) run to/from Ueno Station in Tokyo via the Tōhoku Main Line. The line was extended to Tokyo Station via the Ueno-Tokyo Line that opened in March 2015.

As the Takasaki Line serves many major cities within Saitama Prefecture, it is a vital means of transport within the prefecture. National Route 17 and its historical predecessor, the Nakasendō, run parallel to the line.

== Services ==
Services on the Takasaki Line are typically divided into three categories: services to or from Ueno, Shōnan-Shinjuku Line services, and Ueno-Tokyo Line services. Between Ueno and Ōmiya, trains share the track with the Tōhoku Main Line (Utsunomiya Line), both of which serve as de facto express services compared to the parallel Keihin-Tōhoku Line. Northbound trains mostly terminate at Takasaki or Kagohara, with some at Maebashi or Shin-Maebashi. Southbound trains mostly travel through the Shōnan-Shinjuku Line to Odawara, or the Ueno-Tokyo Line to Atami, on the Tokaido Line, with very few terminating at Ueno. Service on the line is provided by 15-car E231 series and E233-3000 series four-door suburban commuter EMUs with two Green cars; north of Kagohara, this is reduced to 10-cars.

=== Limited express / express ===
Prior to the opening of the Joetsu Shinkansen in 1982 and the Nagano Shinkansen in 1997, many Niigata- and Nagano-bound limited express and express services used the line, including the Toki, Asama, and Hakutaka. However, the Shinkansen reduced the need for most of these limited express services, and only a few remain. These include:

- Akagi / Swallow Akagi (four Ueno-bound and six Maebashi-bound services daily)
- Kusatsu (three round-trips daily between Ueno and Manza-Kazawaguchi)
- Minakami (between Ueno and Minakami)

=== Local/rapid services ===
==== Rapid Urban ====
Since March 2015, Rapid Urban services now run from Odawara or Kōzu (weekends only) on the Tokaido Line, through the Ueno-Tokyo Line, to Takasaki. This service stops at every station on the Tokaido Line, and skips some stations on the Takasaki Line. From the start of March 2024 timetable revision, southbound Urban services to Ueno were ended, which now fully operates one-way. Following this, a through-service train to Maebashi was also discontinued, so all trains now terminate at Takasaki.

==== Local ====
Local trains run approximately four times hourly; one or two of those terminates at Kagohara, while the rest terminate at Takasaki, Shin-Maebashi, or Maebashi.

=== Shōnan-Shinjuku Line services ===
Within the Takasaki Line, Shōnan-Shinjuku Line special rapid and rapid trains are each operated once per hour. Unlike regular Ueno bound or originating trains, they bypass Saitama-Shintoshin as that station has no platform for the tracks used by the Shonan-Shinjuku Line. Urawa used to also be bypassed, but in March 2013, the station finished elevation work that allowed trains to stop at the station at a new dedicated platform.

All trains are 10- or 15-car E231 or E233 series EMUs.

==== Special rapid ====
Special rapid trains operate once hourly to Takasaki, making limited stops. They are unique in that they skip Ebisu in central Tokyo.

==== Rapid ====
Rapid trains operate once hourly to Kagohara, stopping at all stations while within the Takasaki line; this increases 2-3 times an hour during the mornings and evenings, when Takasaki-, Odawara-, and Kozu-bound trains also operate. North of Kagohara, all services are operated with 10-car trainsets.

=== Past services ===
==== Commuter rapid ====
Commuter rapid services operated on weekday evenings only. They operated between Ueno and Maebashi/Takasaki. This service ended on 12 March 2021.

==== Limited express ====
- Akebono (night train between Ueno and Aomori)
- Hokuriku, Noto (night trains between Ueno and Kanazawa)

==== Home Liner Kōnosu ====
Four trains bound for Kōnosu depart Ueno every weekday evening. Passengers can board only at Ueno; all other stations are for disembarking only. Service is provided by 7-car 185 series and 9-car 489 series EMU trainsets.

== Station list ==
- Local trains, excluding Shōnan-Shinjuku Line through trains, stop at all stations (except Nippori).
- For limited express, express, and seasonal rapid Moonlight Echigo services, please see their respective articles.

Legends:

- ● : All trains stop
- ｜: All trains pass (↓: Indicates the direction of Rapid Urban trains passing)
- ▼: Rapid Urban trains stop (Northbound only)
- ■: Shōnan–Shinjuku Line trains stop, but use dedicated platforms on the Tohoku Freight Line
- ∥ : Shōnan–Shinjuku Line trains do not travel within this section

Line name	Station	Japanese	Distance (km)			Local	Rapid Urban	Shōnan- Shinjuku Line		Transfers	Location	
Line name	Station	Japanese	Between stations	Total		Local	Rapid Urban	Shōnan- Shinjuku Line		Transfers	Location	
Line name	Station	Japanese	Between stations	From Tokyo	From Ōmiya	Local	Rapid Urban	Rapid	Special Rapid	Transfers	Location	
Through services from/to:						Ueno–Tokyo Line for Tōkaidō Main Line, and Itō Line		Shōnan-Shinjuku Line (for Tōkaidō Main Line)				
Tōhoku Main Line	Tokyo	東京	-	0.0	30.5	●	▼	∥	∥	Tōhoku Shinkansen; Hokkaido Shinkansen; Yamagata Shinkansen; Akita Shinkansen; Joetsu Shinkansen; Hokuriku Shinkansen; Tōkaidō Main Line (through service); Yamanote Line; Keihin–Tōhoku Line; Yokosuka Line, Sōbu Line (Rapid); Keiyō Line; Chūō Line (Rapid); Tokaido Shinkansen; Tokyo Metro Marunouchi Line	Chiyoda	Tokyo
Tōhoku Main Line	Ueno	上野	3.6	3.6	26.9	●	▼	∥	∥	Tohoku Shinkansen; Joetsu Shinkansen; Jōban Line; Keihin-Tōhoku Line; Utsunomiya Line; Yamanote Line; Tokyo Metro Ginza Line (G-16); Tokyo Metro Hibiya Line (H-18); Keisei Main Line (at Keisei Ueno Station)	Taitō	Tokyo
Tōhoku Main Line	Oku; JU03	尾久	2.6	8.4	22.1	●	↓	∥	∥		Kita	Tokyo
Tōhoku Main Line	Akabane	赤羽	5.0	13.4	17.1	●	▼	■	■	Shōnan-Shinjuku Line (through services for Odawara); Keihin-Tōhoku Line; Saikyō Line	Kita	Tokyo
Tōhoku Main Line	Urawa	浦和	11.0	24.4	6.1	●	▼	■	■	Keihin-Tōhoku Line	Urawa-ku, Saitama	Saitama
Tōhoku Main Line	Saitama-Shintoshin; JU06	さいたま新都心	4.5	28.9	1.6	●	↓	｜	｜	Keihin-Tōhoku Line	Ōmiya-ku, Saitama	Saitama
Tōhoku Main Line	Ōmiya	大宮	1.6	30.5	0.0	●	▼	●	●	Tōhoku Shinkansen; Jōetsu Shinkansen; Utsunomiya Line; Shōnan-Shinjuku Line; Keihin-Tōhoku Line; Saikyō Line; ■ Kawagoe Line; Tobu Urban Park Line; ■ New Shuttle	Ōmiya-ku, Saitama	Saitama
Takasaki Line	Ōmiya	大宮	1.6	30.5	0.0	●	▼	●	●	Tōhoku Shinkansen; Jōetsu Shinkansen; Utsunomiya Line; Shōnan-Shinjuku Line; Keihin-Tōhoku Line; Saikyō Line; ■ Kawagoe Line; Tobu Urban Park Line; ■ New Shuttle	Ōmiya-ku, Saitama	Saitama
Takasaki Line	Miyahara	宮原	4.0	34.5	4.0	●	↓	●	｜		Kita-ku, Saitama	Saitama
Takasaki Line	Ageo	上尾	4.2	38.7	8.2	●	▼	●	●		Ageo	Saitama
Takasaki Line	Kita-Ageo	北上尾	1.7	40.4	9.9	●	↓	●	｜		Ageo	Saitama
Takasaki Line	Okegawa	桶川	1.9	42.3	11.8	●	▼	●	●		Okegawa	Saitama
Takasaki Line	Kitamoto	北本	4.6	46.9	16.4	●	↓	●	●		Kitamoto	Saitama
Takasaki Line	Kōnosu	鴻巣	3.6	50.5	20.0	●	▼	●	●		Kōnosu	Saitama
Takasaki Line	Kita-Kōnosu	北鴻巣	4.3	54.8	24.3	●	↓	●	｜		Kōnosu	Saitama
Takasaki Line	Fukiage	吹上	3.0	57.8	27.3	●	↓	●	｜		Kōnosu	Saitama
Takasaki Line	Gyōda	行田	2.3	60.1	29.6	●	↓	●	｜		Gyōda	Saitama
Takasaki Line	Kumagaya	熊谷	4.8	64.9	34.4	●	▼	●	●	Jōetsu Shinkansen; ■ Chichibu Main Line	Kumagaya	Saitama
Takasaki Line	Kumagaya Freight Terminal	熊谷貨物ターミナル	4.9	69.8	39.3	｜	↓	｜	｜	Chichibu Railway Mikajiri Line (freight)	Kumagaya	Saitama
Takasaki Line	Kagohara	籠原	1.7	71.5	41.0	●	▼	●	●		Kumagaya	Saitama
Takasaki Line	Fukaya	深谷	4.8	76.3	45.8	●	▼	●	●		Fukaya	Saitama
Takasaki Line	Okabe	岡部	4.3	80.6	50.1	●	▼	●	●		Fukaya	Saitama
Takasaki Line	Honjō	本庄	5.6	86.2	55.7	●	▼	●	●		Honjō	Saitama
Takasaki Line	Jimbohara	神保原	4.0	90.2	59.7	●	▼	●	●		Kamisato, Kodama District	Saitama
Takasaki Line	Shinmachi	新町	4.5	94.7	64.2	●	▼	●	●		Takasaki	Gunma
Takasaki Line	Kuragano (Note: Between Kuragano and Takasaki stations lies the former Takasaki Classification Yard(Japanese: 高崎操車場). It is currently used by switching locomotives and freight trains waiting for passenger trains to pass.)	倉賀野	6.1	100.8	70.3	●	▼	●	●	■ Hachiko Line (Note: All Hachiko Line trains run through to Takasaki.)	Takasaki	Gunma
Takasaki Line	Takasaki	高崎	2.5	105.2	74.7	●	▼	●	●	Jōetsu Shinkansen; Hokuriku Shinkansen; ■ Joshin Electric Railway Line; ■ Agatsuma Line (Note: Although the official terminus of the Ryōmō Line is at Shin-Maebashi and that of the Agatsuma Line is at Shibukawa, trains on both lines run through to Takasaki.); ■ Hachiko Line; ■ Joetsu Line (some through service); ■ Ryomo Line; ■ Shinetsu Main Line	Takasaki	Gunma
Through services from/to:						■ Ryōmō Line and ■ Joetsu Line for Shin-Maebashi and Oyama		■ Ryōmō Line and ■ Joetsu Line for Shin-Maebashi and Oyama				

== Rolling stock ==
- E231 series EMUs
- E233-3000 series EMUs (since 1 September 2012)

== History ==
The Nippon Railway Co., the first private railway company in Japan, opened the Ueno - Omiya - Shinmachi section in 1883, and extended the line to Takasaki (and Shinmaebashi) the following year. The company was nationalised in 1906. The line was double-tracked between 1927 and 1930, and electrified in 1952.

=== Former connecting lines ===
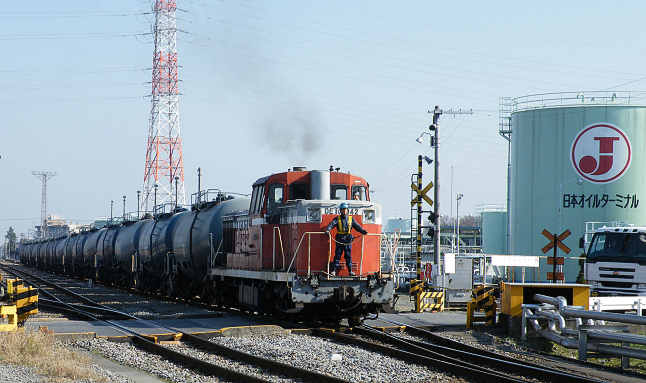
Freight train on the industrial siding built on the alignment of the Iwahana Light Railway in 2008

- Honjo Station: The Honjo Electric Railway operated a 7 km line to Kodama, electrified at 600 V DC, between 1915 and 1930.
- Kumagaya Station: The 10 km Tobu Kumagaya Line to Menuma operated from 1943 to 1983. The planned extension to the Tobu Koizumi Line was never constructed.
- Kuragano Station: The Iwahana Light Railway operated a 3 km line to Joshu Iwahana between 1917 and 1945. In 1967, an approximately 1 km siding was built on the alignment to serve an industrial area.

== See also ==
- Utsunomiya Line
- Tohoku Main Line
- Shonan-Shinjuku Line
- Ueno-Tokyo Line
