= Honjō Station (Saitama) =

Railway station in Honjō, Saitama Prefecture, Japan

Honjō Station 本庄駅
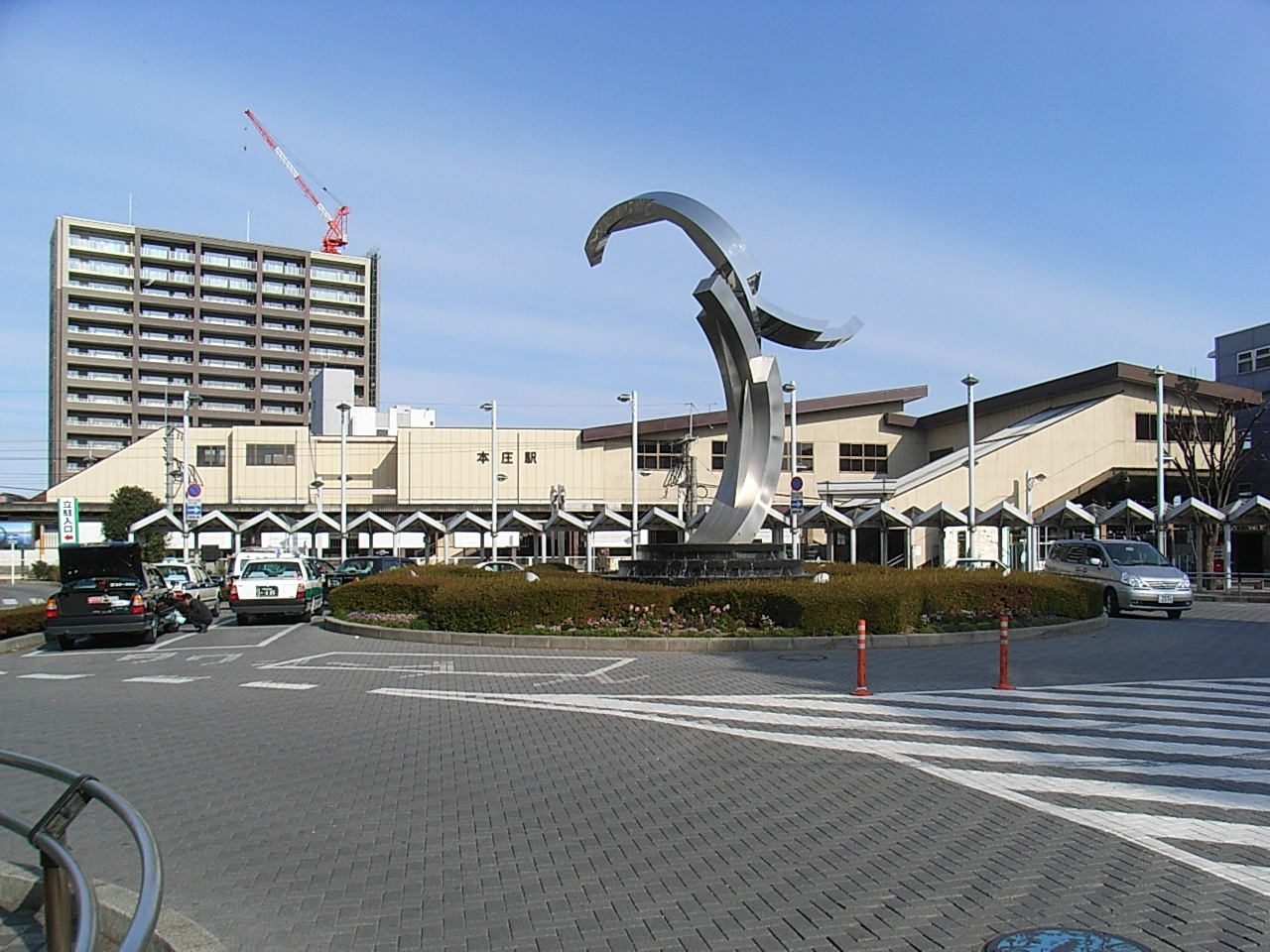
- South entrance of Honjō Station, December 2006

General information
- Location: 3-6-19 Ginza, Honjō-shi, Saitama-ken 367-0041; Japan
- Coordinates: 36.2364°N 139.1884°E
- Operator: JR East
- Line: ■ Takasaki Line
- Distance: 55.7 km from Ōmiya
- Platforms: 1 side + 1 island platform
- Tracks: 3

Other information
- Status: Staffed ("Midori no Madoguchi" )
- Website: Official website

History
- Opened: 21 October 1883

Passengers
- FY2019: 9853 (daily, boarding only)

Services
Preceding station	JR East	Following station
Shinmachi towards Takasaki	Akagi	Okabe towards Ueno or Shinjuku
Jimbohara towards Takasaki	Takasaki Line Rapid Urban	Okabe One-way operation
Jimbohara towards Maebashi	Takasaki Line Local	Okabe towards Tokyo
Jimbohara towards Takasaki	Shōnan–Shinjuku Line Special Rapid	Okabe towards Odawara
Jimbohara towards Maebashi	Shōnan–Shinjuku Line Rapid	Okabe towards Odawara
Location
- Location within Saitama Prefecture Location within Japan

Honjō Station (本庄駅, Honjō-eki) is a passenger railway station located in the city of Honjō, Saitama, Japan, operated by the East Japan Railway Company (JR East).

== Lines ==
Honjō Station is served by the Takasaki Line, with through Shōnan-Shinjuku Line and Ueno-Tokyo Line services to and from the Tōkaidō Main Line. and is located 31.1 kilometers from the terminus of the line at Ōmiya.

== Layout ==
The station has one side platform and one island platform serving three tracks, connected by a footbridge, with an elevated station building located above the platforms. The station has a "Midori no Madoguchi" staffed ticket office.

=== Platforms ===
1,2	■ Takasaki Line (Ueno-Tokyo Line)	for Ōmiya, Ueno, Tokyo, Yokohama, Atami, Numazu and Ito (via Tokaido Line and Ito Line)
1,2	■ Shōnan-Shinjuku Line	for Ōmiya, Shinjuku, Yokohama, Ōfuna, and Odawara (via Tokaido Line)
2,3	■ Takasaki Line	for Takasaki, and Maebashi

== History ==
Honjō Station was opened on 21 October 1883. The station became part of the JR East network after the privatization of the JNR on 1 April 1987.

== Passenger statistics ==
In fiscal 2019, the station was used by an average of 9853 passengers daily (boarding passengers only).

== Surrounding area ==
- Honjō City Hall
- Honjō Post Office

== See also ==
- List of railway stations in Japan
