= Minakami (train) =

Japanese limited express train service

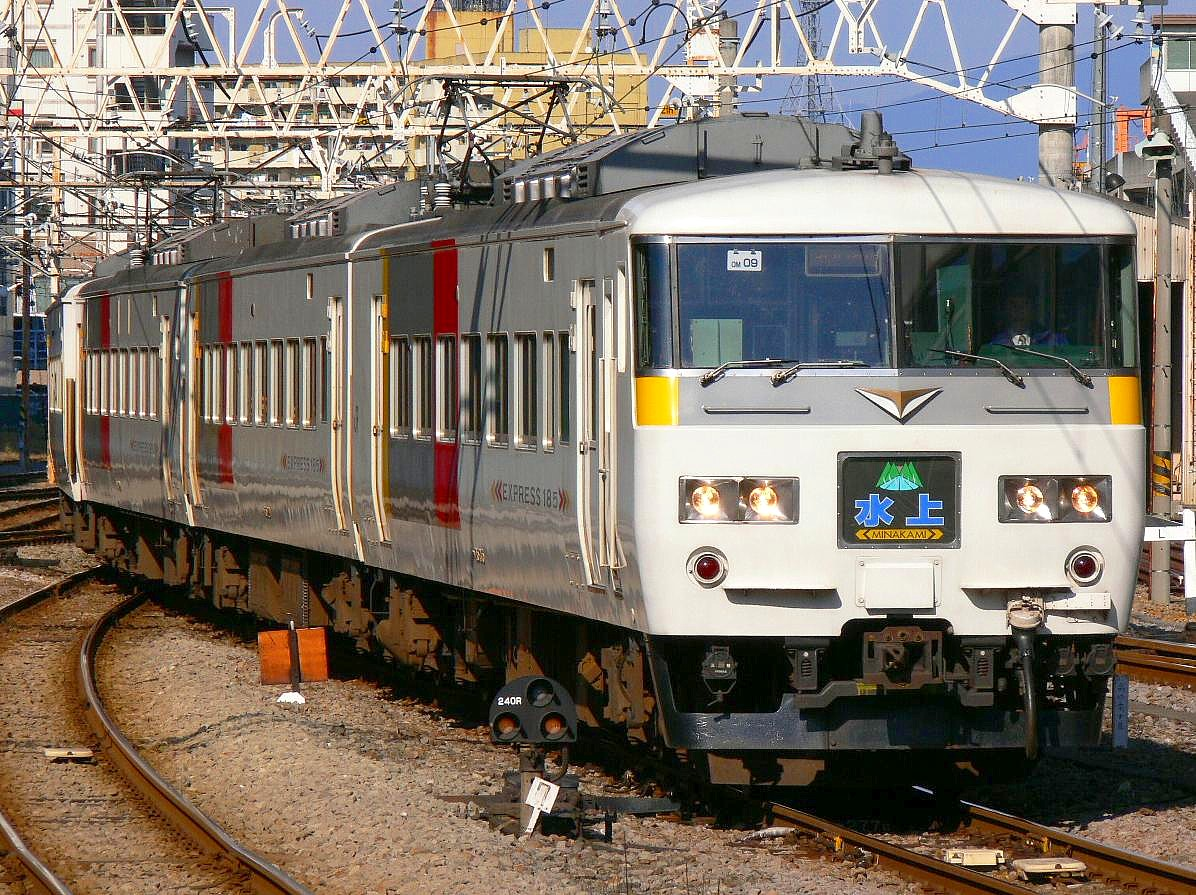
- 185-200 series EMU on a Minakami service, December 2006

Overview
- Service type: Limited express
- First service: 1964 (Semi express); 1997 (Limited express)
- Last service: 2010
- Current operator(s): JR East

Route
- Termini: Ueno; Minakami
- Stops: 14 Stations
- Line(s) used: Tōhoku Main Line, Takasaki Line, Joetsu Line

Technical
- Rolling stock: E653 series EMUs
- Operating speed: 110 km/h (70 mph)

The Minakami (水上) was a limited express train service in Japan operated by the East Japan Railway Company (JR East) between Ueno in Tokyo and Minakami in Gunma Prefecture.

== History ==
The Minakami service (written in hiragana as "みなかみ") began as a semi-express service between Ueno and Minakami from 1 October 1964. This operated until 30 September 1965, after which the train was renamed Okutone.

The name was revived from 1 October 1997 (this time written in kanji as "水上") following the renaming of the former Tanigawa limited express service.

From the start of the revised timetable on 4 December 2010, the Minakami will cease to be a regular service, operating only during busy seasons.

== Rolling stock ==
Services are formed of 7-car E653 series EMU formations.

== Former rolling stock ==
651 series (?-2023) These trains operated with 7 coaches

185 series (1985-2010)
