= Akagi (train) =

Limited express train service in Japan

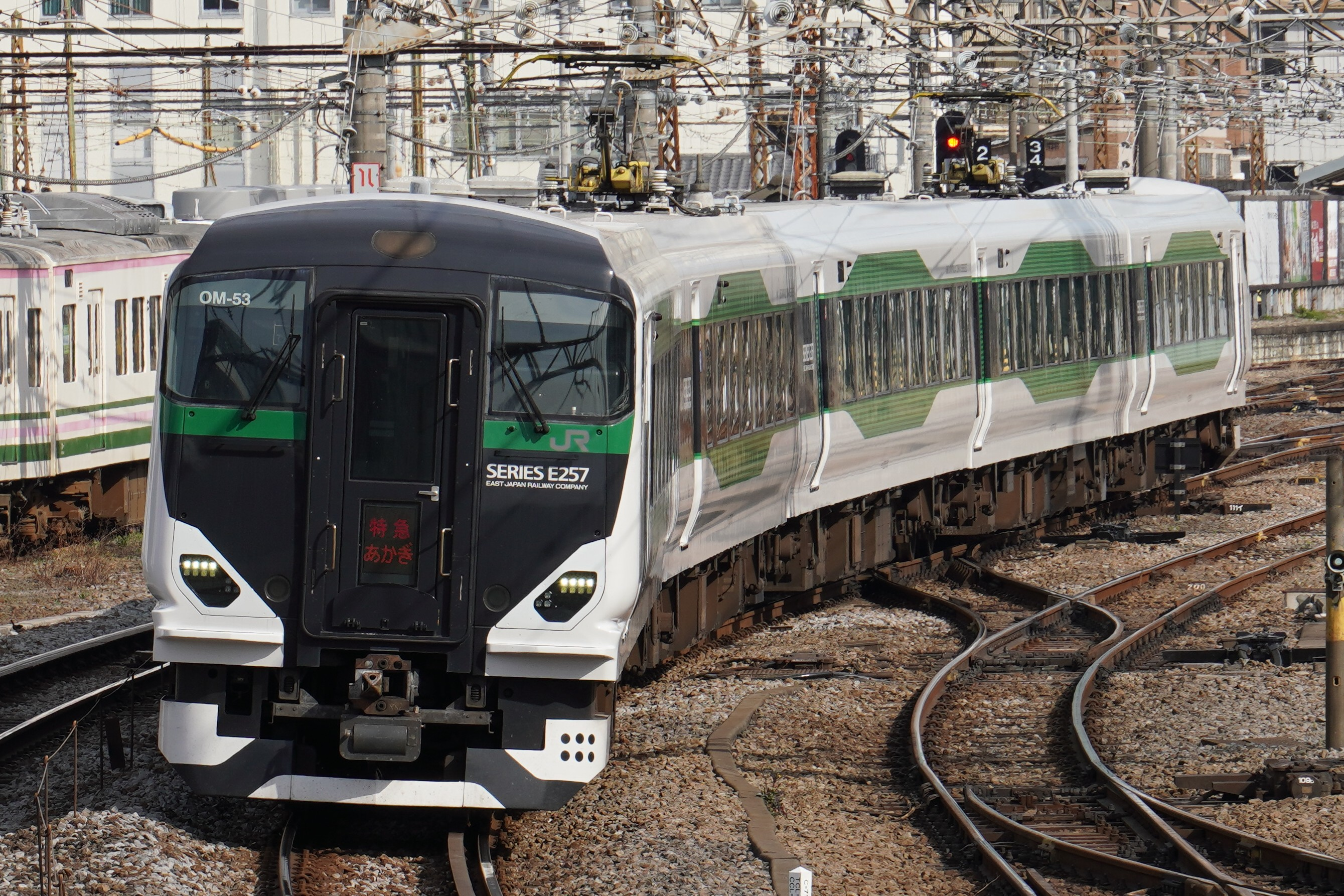
- An E257-5500 series EMU on an Akagi service, March 2023

Overview
- Service type: Limited express
- Status: Operational
- Locale: Tokyo / Gunma Prefecture
- First service: 10 March 1960 (Semi express); 14 March 1985 (Limited express)
- Current operator(s): JR East
- Former operator(s): JNR

Route
- Termini: Ueno or Shinjuku; Takasaki
- Distance travelled: 111.2 km (69.1 mi)
- Line(s) used: Tohoku Main Line, Takasaki Line

On-board services
- Class(es): Green + Standard
- Seating arrangements: 2+2 unidirectional

Technical
- Rolling stock: E257-5500 series EMUs
- Track gauge: 1,067 mm (3 ft 6 in)
- Electrification: 1,500 V DC overhead
- Operating speed: 110 km/h (70 mph)

The Akagi (あかぎ) is a limited express train service in Japan operated by the East Japan Railway Company (JR East). It runs between Tokyo (Ueno or Shinjuku stations) and Maebashi in Gunma Prefecture. Some trains run to or from Takasaki or Honjō.

== Rolling stock ==
- E257-5500 series EMUs

From the start of the revised timetable on 18 March 2023, modified E257-5500 series 5-car EMUs were introduced on Akagi services, replacing the aging 651-1000 series 7-car trains.

=== Former rolling stock ===
- 651-1000 series EMUs
- 185 series EMUs

From the start of the revised timetable on 15 March 2014, refurbished 651 series EMUs were introduced on Akagi services, replacing the aging 185 series trains. Until March 2016, one return service to and from Shinjuku continued to use 185 series rolling stock.

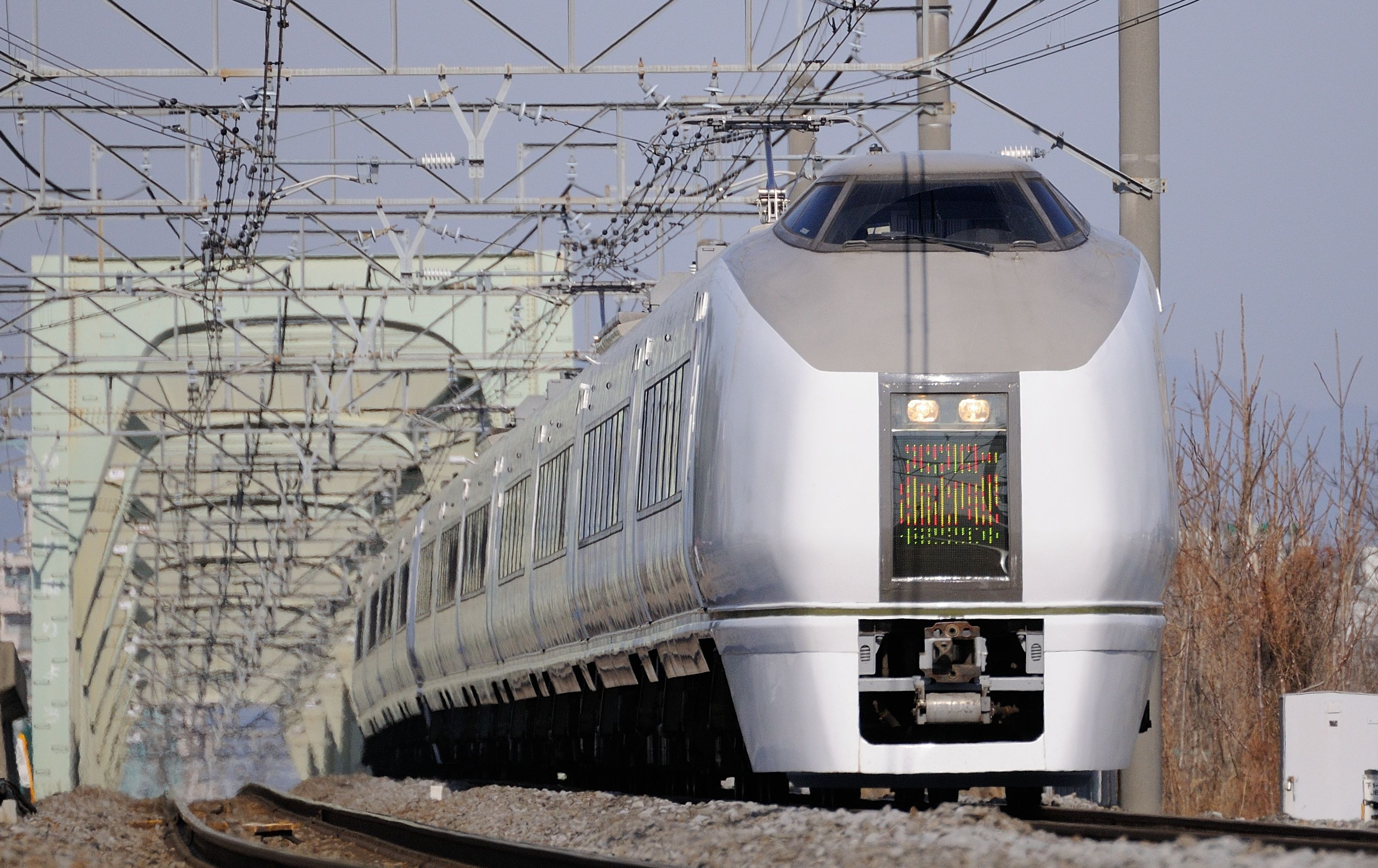
A 651-1000 series EMU on an Akagi service, March 2014

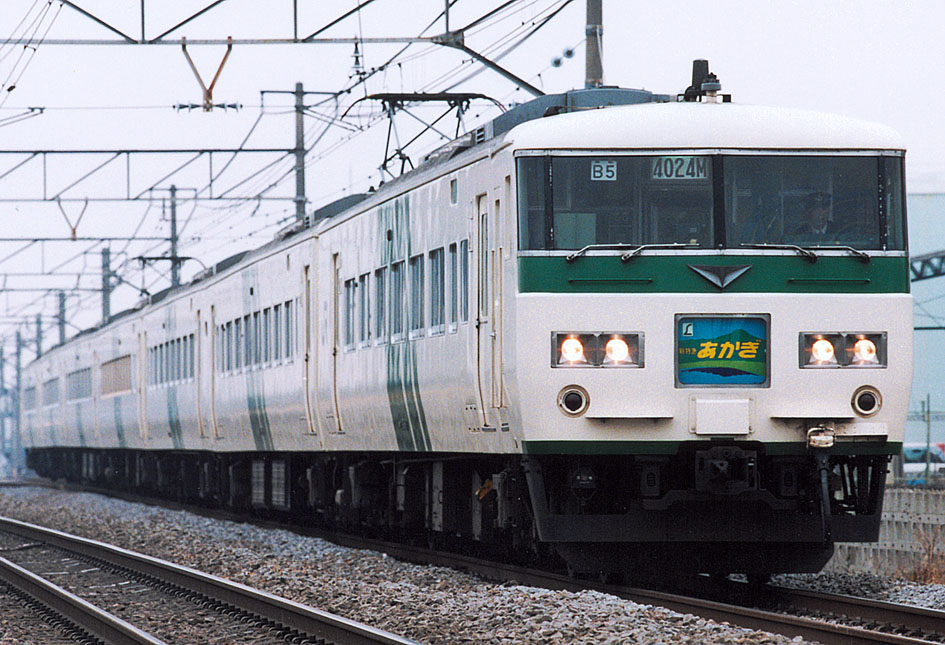
A 185 series EMU in original livery

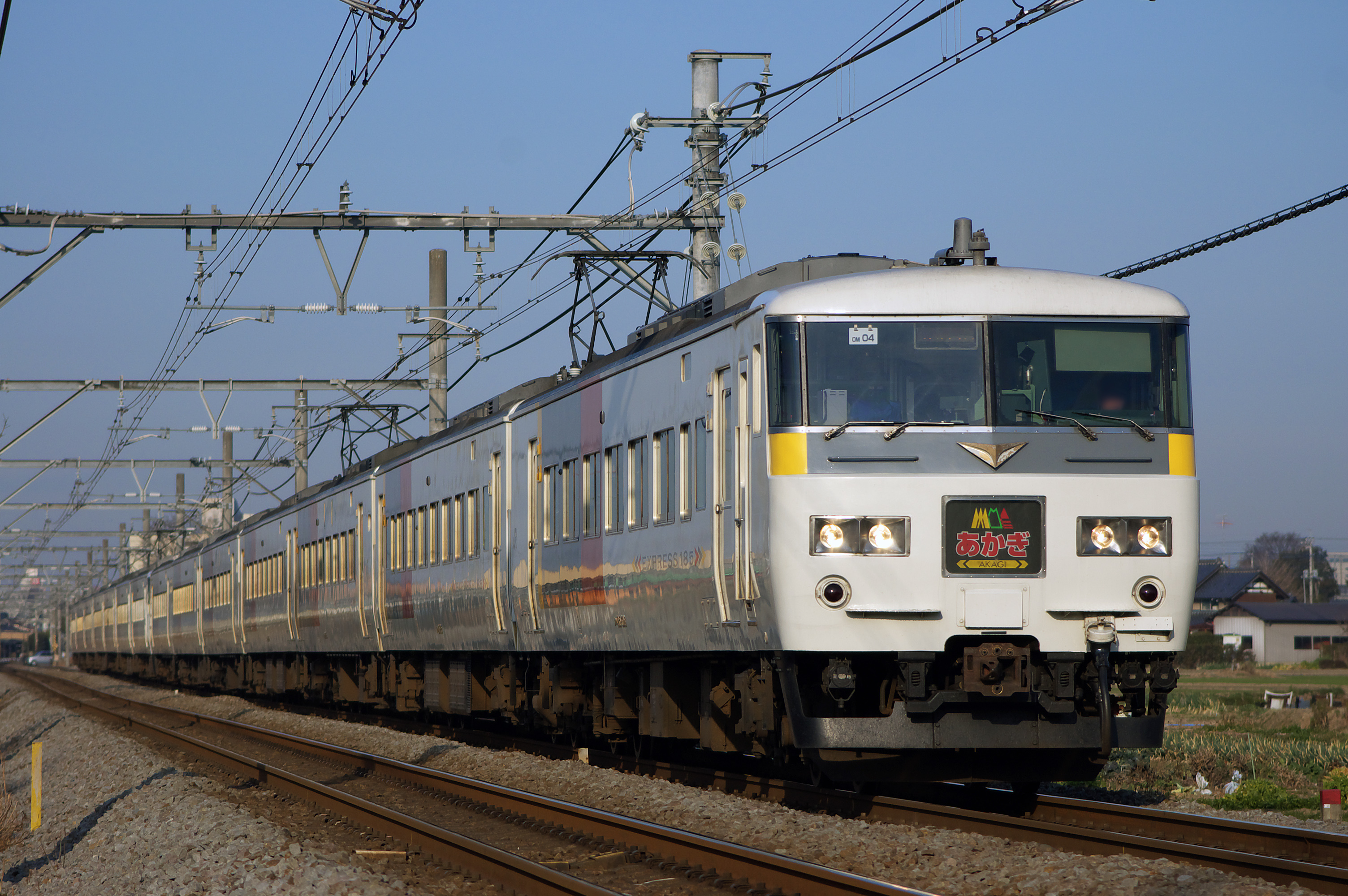
A 185-200 series EMU, January 2008

== History ==
The Akagi service first started on 10 March 1960 as a semi-express service operating between Ueno and Maebashi. From 14 March 1985, the service was upgraded to limited express status.

From 18 November 2013, one car (car 3 in 7- and 10-car formations, and cars 3 and 10 in 14-car formations) was designated as a reserved-seating car.

From the start of the revised timetable on 15 March 2014, eleven Akagi services running during weekday peak commuting hours were renamed Swallow Akagi (スワローあかぎ) with all ordinary-class seats reservable.

Since 13 March 2021, this limited express no longer runs on the Ryomo or Joetsu Lines. Northbound services terminate at Takasaki instead of continuing on to Shin-Maebashi or Maebashi.

Effective 18 March 2023, all Swallow Akagi services were converted back to ordinary Akagi services with all departures requiring a reservation.

== See also ==
- List of named passenger trains of Japan
