= Takasaki Station =

Major Junction Railway station in Takasaki, Gunma Prefecture, Japan

Takasaki Station 高崎駅
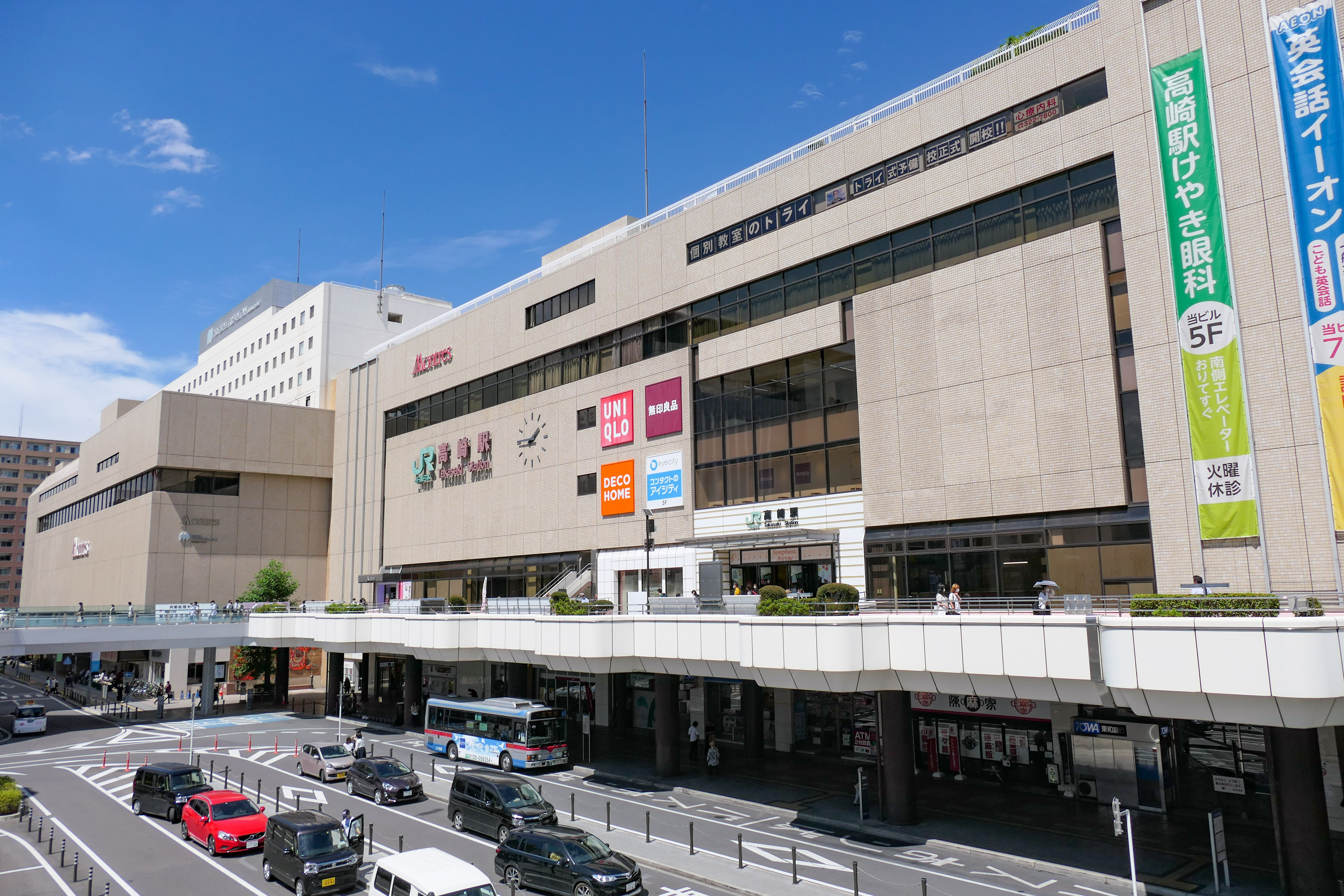
- West entrance of Takasaki station

General information
- Location: 222 Yashimachō, Takasaki City, Gunma Prefecture; Japan
- Coordinates: 36.322°N 139.013°E
- Operator: JR East; JR Freight; Jōshin Dentetsu
- Lines: JR East; Hokuriku Shinkansen; Takasaki Line; Shōnan–Shinjuku Line; Ueno–Tokyo Line; Hachikō Line; Jōetsu Line; Ryōmō Line; Agatsuma Line; Shin'etsu Main Line; Jōshin Line
- Distance: 105.0 kilometers from Tokyo
- Platforms: 6 island platforms + 1 bay platform
- Connections: Bus terminal

Other information
- Status: Staffed (Midori no Madoguchi)
- Website: Official website

History
- Opened: 1 May 1884; 142 years ago

Passengers
- FY2021: 22,940 daily (JR East); 8,757 daily (Shinkansen)

Services
Preceding station	JR East	Following station
Jōmō-Kōgen towards Niigata	Jōetsu Shinkansen Toki	Honjō-Waseda towards Tokyo
Jōmō-Kōgen towards Gala-Yuzawa	Jōetsu Shinkansen Tanigawa	Honjō-Waseda towards Tokyo
Annaka-Haruna towards Jōetsumyōkō	Hokuriku Shinkansen Hakutaka	Ōmiya towards Tokyo
Annaka-Haruna towards Nagano	Hokuriku Shinkansen Asama	Honjō-Waseda towards Tokyo
Shin-Maebashi towards Manza-Kazawaguchi	Kusatsu	Kumagaya towards Ueno
Terminus	Akagi	Shinmachi towards Ueno or Shinjuku
Terminus	Takasaki Line Rapid Urban	Kuragano One-way operation
Takasakitonyamachi (through service via Ryōmō Line) towards Maebashi	Takasaki Line Local	Kuragano towards Tokyo
Terminus	Shōnan–Shinjuku Line Special Rapid	Kuragano towards Odawara
Takasakitonyamachi towards Maebashi	Shōnan–Shinjuku Line Rapid	Kuragano towards Odawara
Terminus	Hachikō Line	Kuragano towards Komagawa
Takasakitonyamachi towards Nagaoka	Jōetsu Line	Terminus
Takasakitonyamachi towards Ōmae	Agatsuma Line	Terminus
Takasakitonyamachi towards Oyama	Ryōmō Line	Terminus
Kita-Takasaki towards Yokokawa	Shin'etsu Main Line Takasaki – Yokokawa	Terminus
Preceding station	Joshin Electric Railway	Following station
Minami-Takasaki towards Shimonita	Jōshin Line	Terminus
Location
- Location within Gunma Prefecture Location within Japan

Takasaki Station (高崎駅, Takasaki-eki) is a major junction railway station located in the city of Takasaki, Gunma, Japan, operated by the East Japan Railway Company (JR East) and the private railway operator Jōshin Dentetsu. It is also a freight depot for the Japan Freight Railway Company (JR Freight).

== Lines ==
=== Shinkansen ===
- Jōetsu Shinkansen
- Hokuriku Shinkansen

=== JR East ===
- Takasaki Line
- Shōnan–Shinjuku Line
- Ueno–Tokyo Line
- Hachikō Line
- Jōetsu Line
- Ryōmō Line
- Agatsuma Line
- Shin'etsu Main Line
- SL Gunma Minakami
- Akagi

=== Jōshin Dentetsu ===
- Jōshin Line

=== Previous services ===
- Minakami

== Station layout ==
The Shinkansen portion of the station has two elevated island platforms, with the station building underneath. The JR East local portion of the station has three ground-level island platforms, with one platform forming a half-bay platform, so that a total of seven tracks can be served, and the Jōshin Dentetsu portion of the station has a single bay platform.

=== JR East ===
1	■	(Not in use)
2; 4	■ Takasaki Line (Ueno-Tokyo Line)	for Ōmiya, Ueno, Tokyo, Yokohama, Atami, Numazu and Ito (via Tokaido Line and Ito Line)
2; 4	■ Shōnan-Shinjuku Line	for Ōmiya, Shinjuku, Yokohama, Ōfuna, and Odawara (via Tokaido Line)
2; 4	■ Jōetsu Line	for Shin-Maebashi, Shibukawa, Minakami, Echigo-Yuzawa, Nagaoka
2; 4	■ Agatsuma Line	for Shin-Maebashi, Shibukawa, Naganohara-Kusatsuguchi, Manza-Kazawaguchi
2; 4	■ Ryōmō Line	for Shin-Maebashi, Maebashi, Kiryū, Sano, Oyama (Through trains from the Takasaki Line, Shōnan-Shinjuku Line)
2; 4	■ Shin'etsu Main Line	for Annaka, Yokokawa
2; 4	■ Limited Express Kusatsu	for Naganohara-Kusatsuguchi
2; 4	■ Limited Express Akagi; Swallow Akagi	for Maebashi
3	■ Hachikō Line	for Gunma-Fujioka, Yorii, Komagawa
5; 6	■ Joetsu Line	for Shin-Maebashi, Shibukawa, Minakami, Echigo-Yuzawa, Nagaoka
5; 6	■ Agatsuma Line	for Shin-Maebashi, Shibukawa, Naganohara-Kusatsuguchi, Manza-Kazawaguchi
5; 6	■ Ryōmō Line	for Shin-Maebashi, Maebashi, Kiryū, Sano, Oyama
5; 6	■ Shin'etsu Main Line	for Annaka, Yokokawa
7; 8	■ Takasaki Line (Ueno-Tokyo Line)	for Ōmiya, Ueno, Tokyo, Yokohama, Atami, Numazu and Ito (via Tōkaidō Line and Itō Line) (Through trains from the Ryōmō Line)
7; 8	■ Shōnan-Shinjuku Line	for Ōmiya, Shinjuku, Yokohama, Ōfuna and Odawara (via Tokaido Line) (Through trains from the Ryōmō Line)
7; 8	■ Limited Express Kusatsu	for Ueno
7; 8	■ Limited Express Akagi; Swallow Akagi	for Ōmiya, Ueno, Shinjuku
11; 12	■ Joetsu Shinkansen	for Echigo-Yuzawa, Nagaoka, Niigata
11; 12	■ Hokuriku Shinkansen	for Nagano, Toyama, Kanazawa
11; 12	■ Jōetsu Shinkansen, Hokuriku Shinkansen	for Ōmiya, Ueno, Tokyo
13; 14	■ Jōetsu Shinkansen, Hokuriku Shinkansen	for Ōmiya, Ueno, Tokyo

=== Jōshin Dentetsu ===
0	■ Jōshin Line	for Shimonita

== History ==
The JR East station opened on May 1, 1884, as the then-terminus of the Nippon Railway. The Jōshin Line opened on May 10, 1897. Upon the privatization of the Japanese National Railways (JNR) on 1 April 1987, it came under the control of JR East. The Jōetsu Shinkansen was extended to Takasaki Station on November 15, 1982.

== Bus terminals ==
Buses serving the station are operated by the following operators.

- Gunma Bus
- Gunma Chuo Bus
- Kan-etsu Kotsu
- Joshin Railway
- Nippon Chuo Bus

=== Highway buses ===
- Sendai Liner; For Sendai Station (Nippon Chuo Bus)
- Azalea; For Narita International Airport (Kan-etsu kotsu, Chiba Kotsu)
- Airport Limousine; For Haneda Airport (Nippon Chuo Bus, Airport Transport Service)
- For Nerima Station, Ikebukuro Station, Shinjuku, and Akihabara Station (Nippon Chuo Bus)
- For Niigata Station, Bandai City Bus Center (Nippon Chuo Bus)
- For Fuji-Q Highland, Kawaguchiko Station (Kan-etsu Kotsu, Fujikyu Yamanashi Bus)
- For Toyama Station, Kanazawa Station and Kenroku-en (Nippon Chuo Bus)
- Silk Liner; For Kanayama Station, Nagoya Station, Nara, Kyōto Station, and Osaka City Air Terminal(Namba Station) (Nippon Chuo Bus)

== Passenger statistics ==
In fiscal 2019, the JR portion of the station was used by an average of 32,160 passengers daily (boarding passengers only). The Jōshin Dentetsu portion of the station was used by 2280 passengers daily in fiscal 2018.

== See also ==
- List of railway stations in Japan
