= Komagata Station =

Railway station in Maebashi, Gunma Prefecture, Japan

Komagata Station 駒形駅
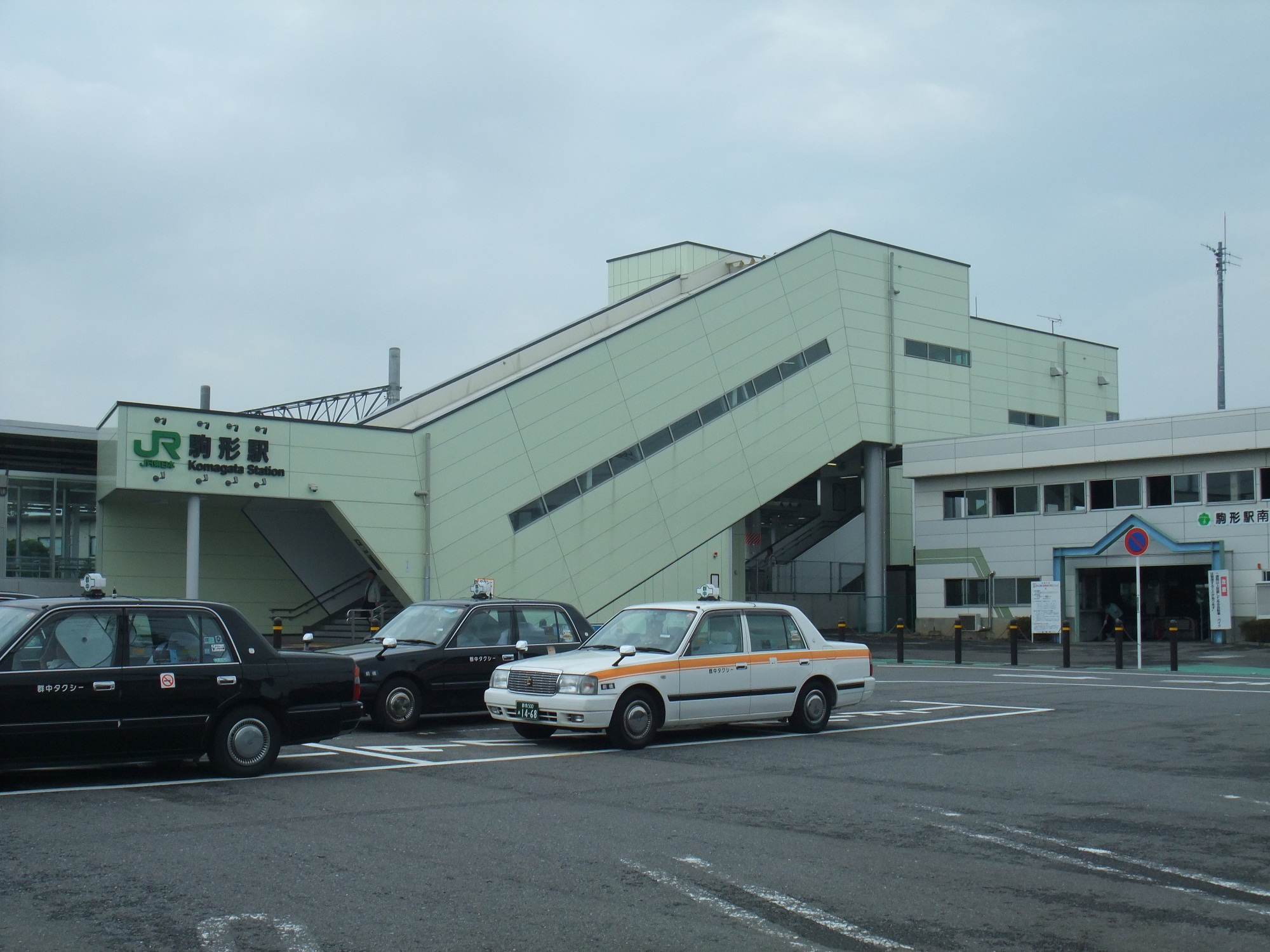
- Komagata Station, July 2012

General information
- Location: Koyaharamachi 852, Maebashi-shi, Gunma-ken 379-2121; Japan
- Coordinates: 36.3544°N 139.1396°E
- Operator: JR East
- Line: ■ Ryōmō Line
- Distance: 74.9 km from Oyama
- Platforms: 1 side + 1 island platform

Other information
- Status: Staffed
- Website: Official website

History
- Opened: 20 November 1889; 136 years ago

Passengers
- FY2021: 2,468 daily

Services
Preceding station	JR East	Following station
Maebashi-Ōshima towards Takasaki	Ryōmō Line	Isesaki towards Oyama
Location
- Location within Gunma Prefecture Location within Japan

Komagata Station (駒形駅, Komagata-eki) is a passenger railway station in the city of Maebashi, Gunma Prefecture, Japan, operated by East Japan Railway Company (JR East).

== Lines ==
Komagata Station is served by the Ryōmō Line, and is located 74.9 rail kilometers from the terminus of the line at Oyama Station, and 16.8 km from Takasaki Station. The preceding station of Isesaki is 5.8 km away and the following station of Maebashi-Ōshima is 3.2 km away.

== Station layout ==
The station consists of one side platform and one island platform connected by a footbridge. It is equipped with automated ticket vending machines, and has several accessibility features such as elevators, mobility scooter access, a wheelchair-accessible bathroom, and a Braille fare table.

=== Platforms ===
1	■ Ryōmō Line	for Maebashi, and Takasaki
2	■ Ryōmō Line	not in normal use
3	■ Ryōmō Line	for Isesaki, Kiryū and Oyama

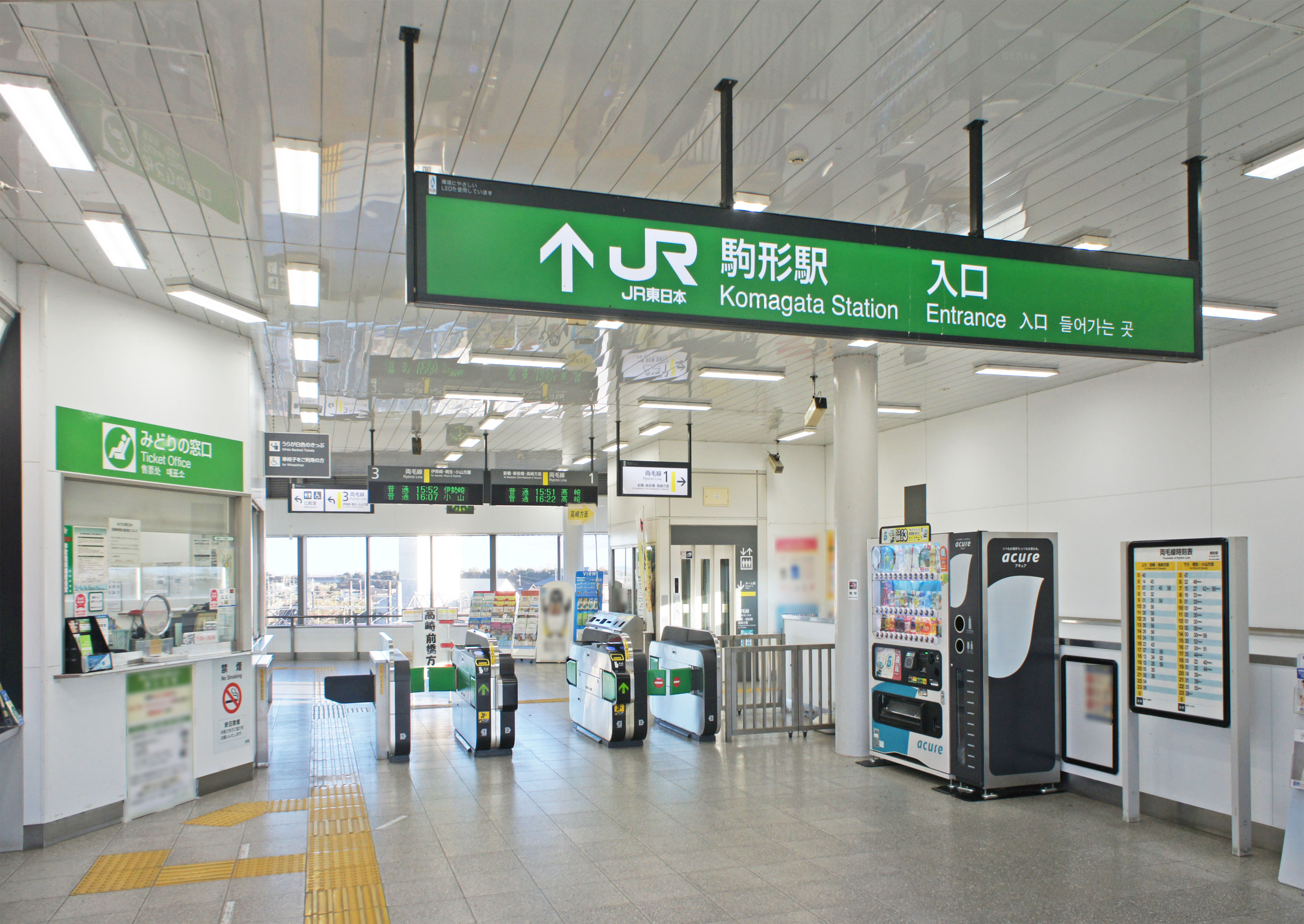
Ticket Gate November 2021

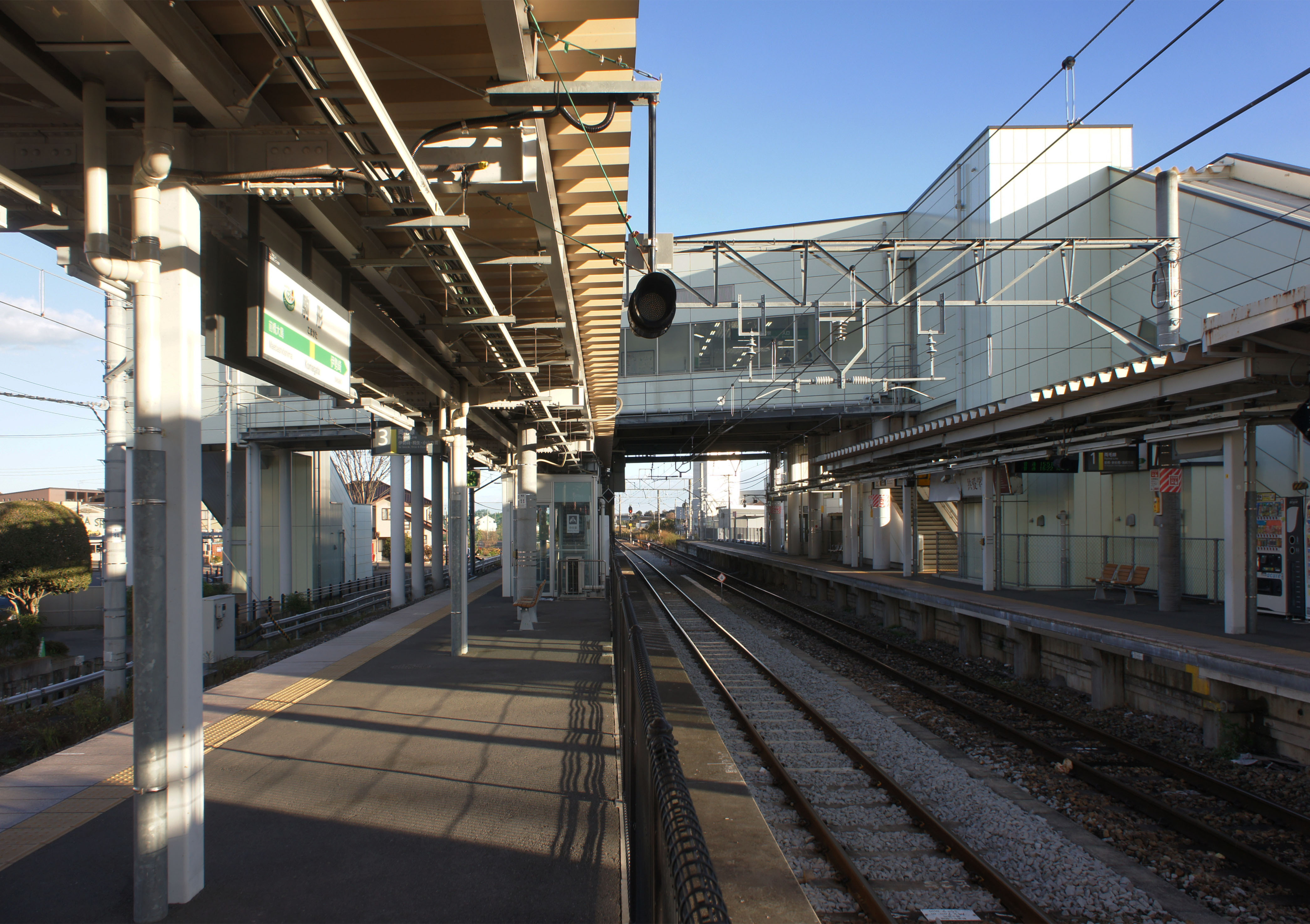
Platforms November 2021

== History ==
Komagata Station was opened on 20 November 1889. The station was absorbed into the JR East network upon the privatization of the Japanese National Railways (JNR) on 1 April 1987. Komagata station started accepting Suica cards on 18 November 2001. On 28 March 2011 a new elevated station building was completed.

The Midori no Madoguchi ticket office was closed on 30 November 2021.

== Passenger statistics ==
In fiscal 2021, the station was used by an average of 2,468 passengers daily (boarding passengers only).

Below is table containing the passenger statistics since the year 2000:

Passenger statistics
Year	Average Daily Boarding Passengers	Year	Average Daily Boarding Passengers	Year	Average Daily Boarding Passengers
2000	2,753	2010	2,614	2020	2,210
2001	2,729	2011	2,640	2021	2,468
2002	2,589	2012	2,723		
2003	2,661	2013	2,887		
2004	2,688	2014	2,771		
2005	2,682	2015	2,850		
2006	2,668	2016	2,862		
2007	2,622	2017	2,930		
2008	2,697	2018	2,998		
2009	2,645	2019	2,939		

== Surrounding area ==
- Kita-Kantō Expressway
- Kyoai Gakuen affiliated schools
  - Kindergarten
  - Elementary School
  - Middle/High School
  - Kyoai Gakuen University
- Garden Maebashi (Shopping mall)
- Maebashi-Higashi Post Office

== Bus routes ==
- Nippon Chuo Bus
  - Towards Ōgo Station
  - Towards Takasaki Station East Exit
  - Towards Maebashi Park
  - Towards Shikishima Park

== See also ==
- List of railway stations in Japan
