= Okegawa Station =

Railway station in Okegawa, Saitama Prefecture, Japan

Okegawa Station 桶川駅
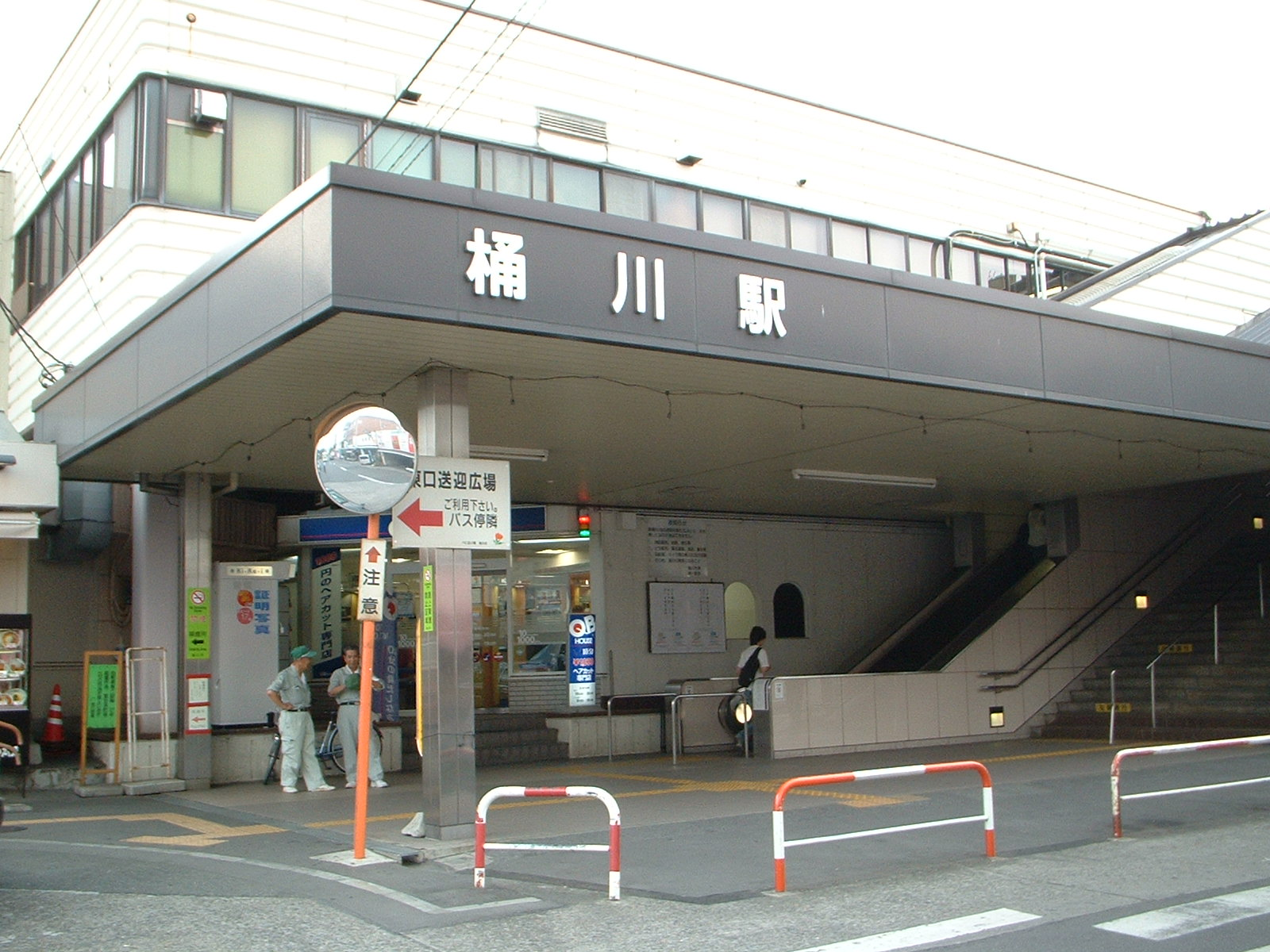
- Okegawa Station in 2008

General information
- Location: 1-1-1 Minami, Okegawa-shi, Saitama-ken 363-0015; Japan
- Coordinates: 35°59′54″N 139°33′51″E
- Operator: JR East
- Line: ■ Takasaki Line
- Distance: 11.8 km from Ōmiya
- Platforms: 1 island + 1 side platform

Other information
- Status: Staffed
- Website: Official website

History
- Opened: 1 March 1885

Passengers
- FY2019: 26,296 daily

Services
Preceding station	JR East	Following station
Kitamoto towards Takasaki	Akagi	Ageo towards Ueno or Shinjuku
Kōnosu towards Takasaki	Takasaki Line Rapid Urban	Ageo One-way operation
Kitamoto towards Maebashi	Takasaki Line Local	Kita-Ageo towards Tokyo
Kitamoto towards Takasaki	Shōnan–Shinjuku Line Special Rapid	Ageo towards Odawara
Kitamoto towards Maebashi	Shōnan–Shinjuku Line Rapid	Kita-Ageo towards Odawara
Location
- Location within Saitama Prefecture Location within Japan

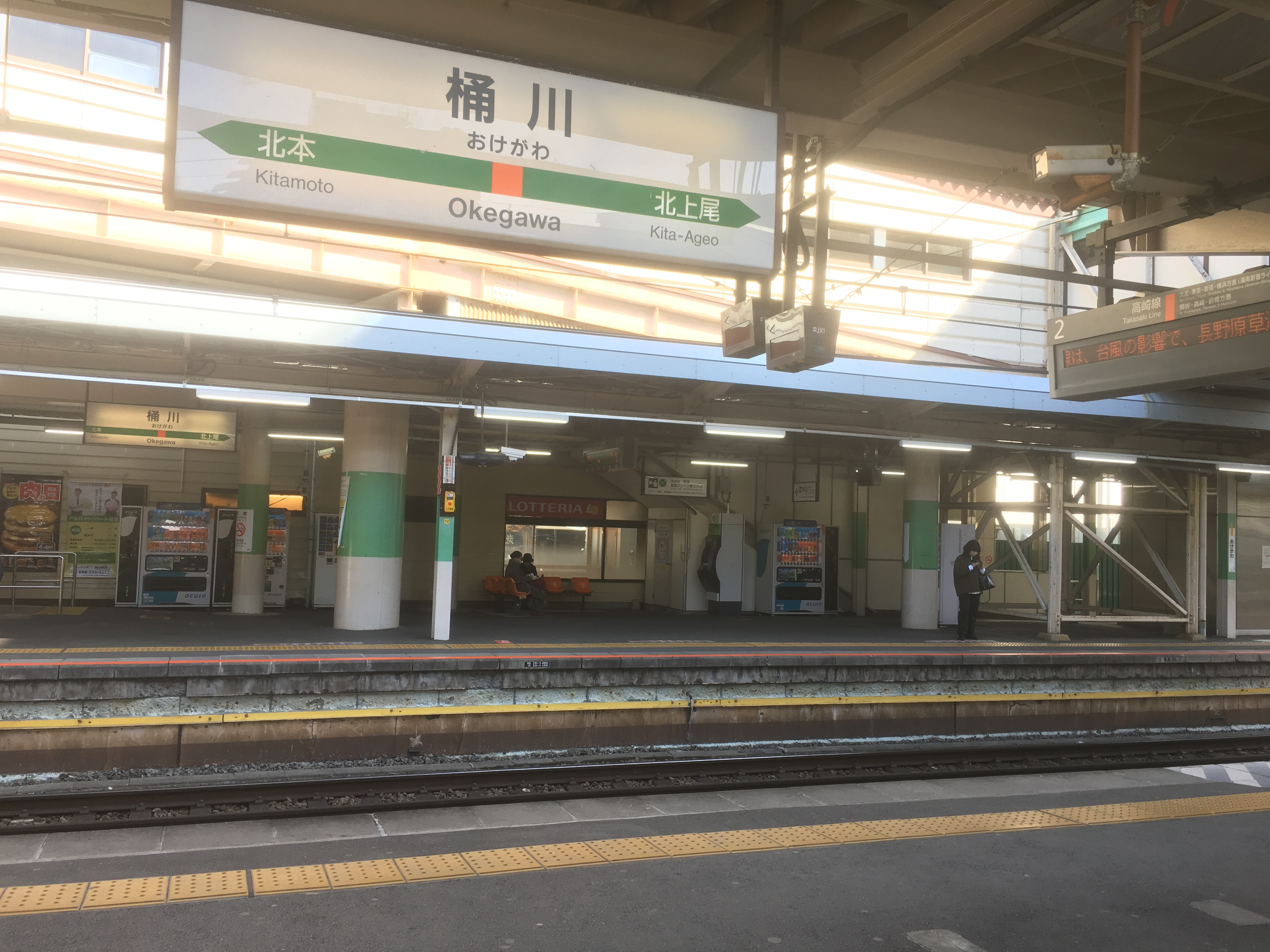
Platforms, 2020

Okegawa Station (桶川駅, Okegawa-eki) is a passenger railway station located in the city of Okegawa, Saitama, Japan, operated by East Japan Railway Company (JR East).

== Lines ==
Okegawa Station is served by the Takasaki Line, with through Shonan-Shinjuku Line and Ueno-Tokyo Line services to and from the Tokaido Line. It is 11.8 kilometers from the nominal starting point of the Takasaki Line at Ōmiya, and 42.3 kilometers from Tokyo.

== Layout ==
The station has one side platform and one island platform serving three tracks, connected by a footbridge, with an elevated station building located above the platforms. The station has a "Midori no Madoguchi" staffed ticket office.

=== Platforms ===
1	■ Takasaki Line (Ueno-Tokyo Line)	for Ōmiya, Ueno, Tokyo, Yokohama, Atami, Numazu and Ito (via Tokaido Line and Ito Line)
1	■ Shōnan-Shinjuku Line	for Ōmiya, Shinjuku, Yokohama, Ōfuna, and Odawara (via Tokaido Line)
2	■ Takasaki Line	(not normally used)
3	■ Takasaki Line	for Kumagaya, Kagohara, Takasaki, and Maebashi

== History ==
The station opened on 1 March 1885. The station became part of the JR East network after the privatization of the JNR on 1 April 1987.

== Passenger statistics ==
In fiscal 2019, the station was used by an average of 26,296 passengers daily (boarding passengers only).

== Surrounding area ==
- Okegawa City Hall
- site of Okegawa-shuku

== See also ==
- List of railway stations in Japan
