= Fukiage Station =

Fukiage Station (吹上駅) is the name of two train stations in Japan:

- Fukiage Station (Nagoya) in Nagoya, Aichi Prefecture.
- Fukiage Station (Saitama)
