= Kita-Kōnosu Station =

Railway station in Kōnosu, Saitama Prefecture, Japan

Kita-Kōnosu Station 北鴻巣駅
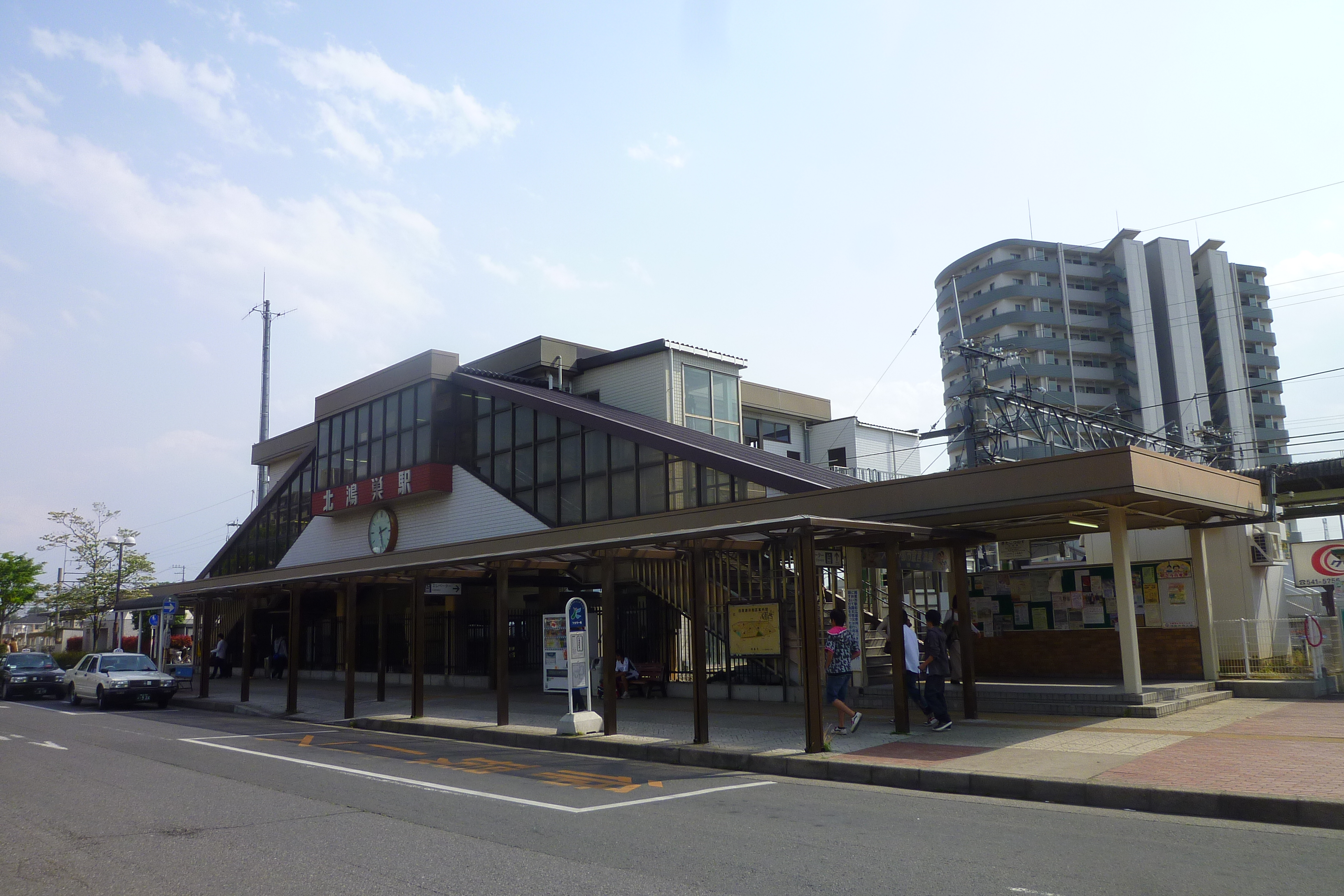
- Kita-Kōnosu Station in 2011

General information
- Location: 1-5-1 Akamidai, Kōnosu-shi, Saitama-ken 365-0064; Japan
- Coordinates: 36°05′08″N 139°28′37″E
- Operator: JR East
- Line: ■ Takasaki Line
- Distance: 24.3 km from Ōmiya
- Platforms: 1 island platform

Other information
- Status: Staffed
- Website: Official website

History
- Opened: 3 November 1984

Passengers
- FY2019: 7,224 daily

Services
Preceding station	JR East	Following station
Fukiage towards Maebashi	Takasaki Line Local	Kōnosu towards Tokyo
Fukiage towards Maebashi	Shōnan–Shinjuku Line Rapid	Kōnosu towards Odawara
Location
- Location within Saitama Prefecture Location within Japan

Kita-Kōnosu Station (北鴻巣駅, Kita-Kōnosu-eki) is a passenger railway station located in the city of Kōnosu, Saitama, Japan, operated by East Japan Railway Company (JR East) .

== Lines ==
Kita-Kōnosu Station is served by the Takasaki Line, with through Shōnan-Shinjuku Line and Ueno-Tokyo Line services to and from the Tōkaidō Line. It is 24.3 kilometers from the nominal starting point of the Takasaki Line at Ōmiya.

== Station layout ==
The station has a single island platform serving two tracks, with an elevated station building located above the platforms. The station is staffed.

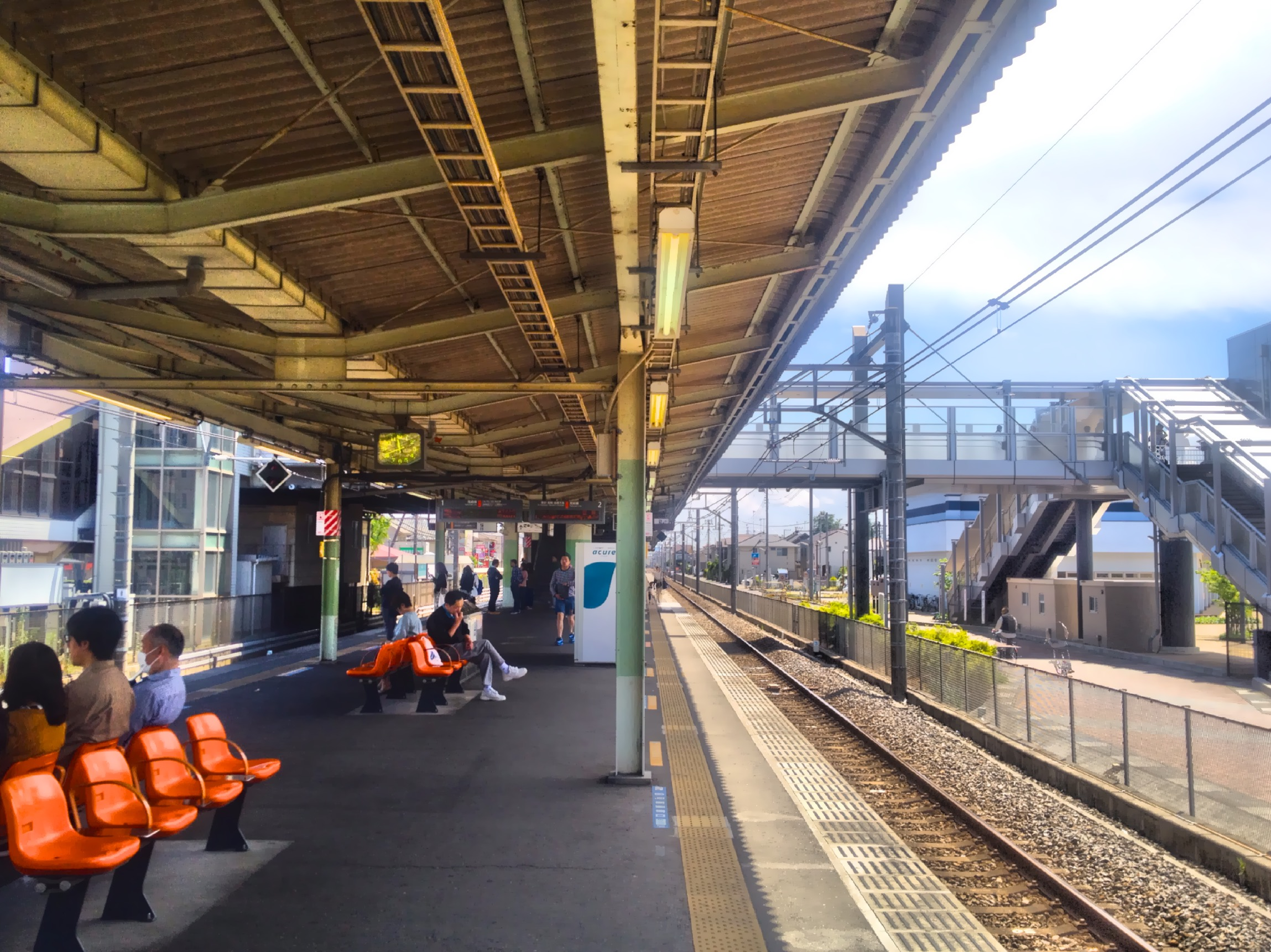
Platforms, 2018

=== Platforms ===
1	■ Takasaki Line (Ueno-Tokyo Line)	for Ōmiya, Ueno, Tokyo, Yokohama, Atami, Numazu and Itō (via Tōkaidō Line and Ito Line)
1	■ Shōnan-Shinjuku Line	for Ōmiya, Shinjuku, Yokohama, Ōfuna, and Odawara (via Tōkaidō Line)
2	■ Takasaki Line	for Kumagaya, Kagohara, Takasaki, and Maebashi

== History ==
The station opened on 3 November 1984. The station became part of the JR East network after the privatization of Japanese National Railways (JNR) on 1 April 1987.

== Passenger statistics ==
In fiscal 2019, the station was used by an average of 7,224 passengers daily (boarding passengers only).

== Surrounding area ==
- Kita-Kōnosu Post Office
- Akamidai Dai-Ichi Elementary School
- Akamidai Dai-Ni Elementary School

== See also ==
- List of railway stations in Japan
