= Kōnosu Station =

Railway station in Kōnosu, Saitama Prefecture, Japan

Kōnosu Station 鴻巣駅
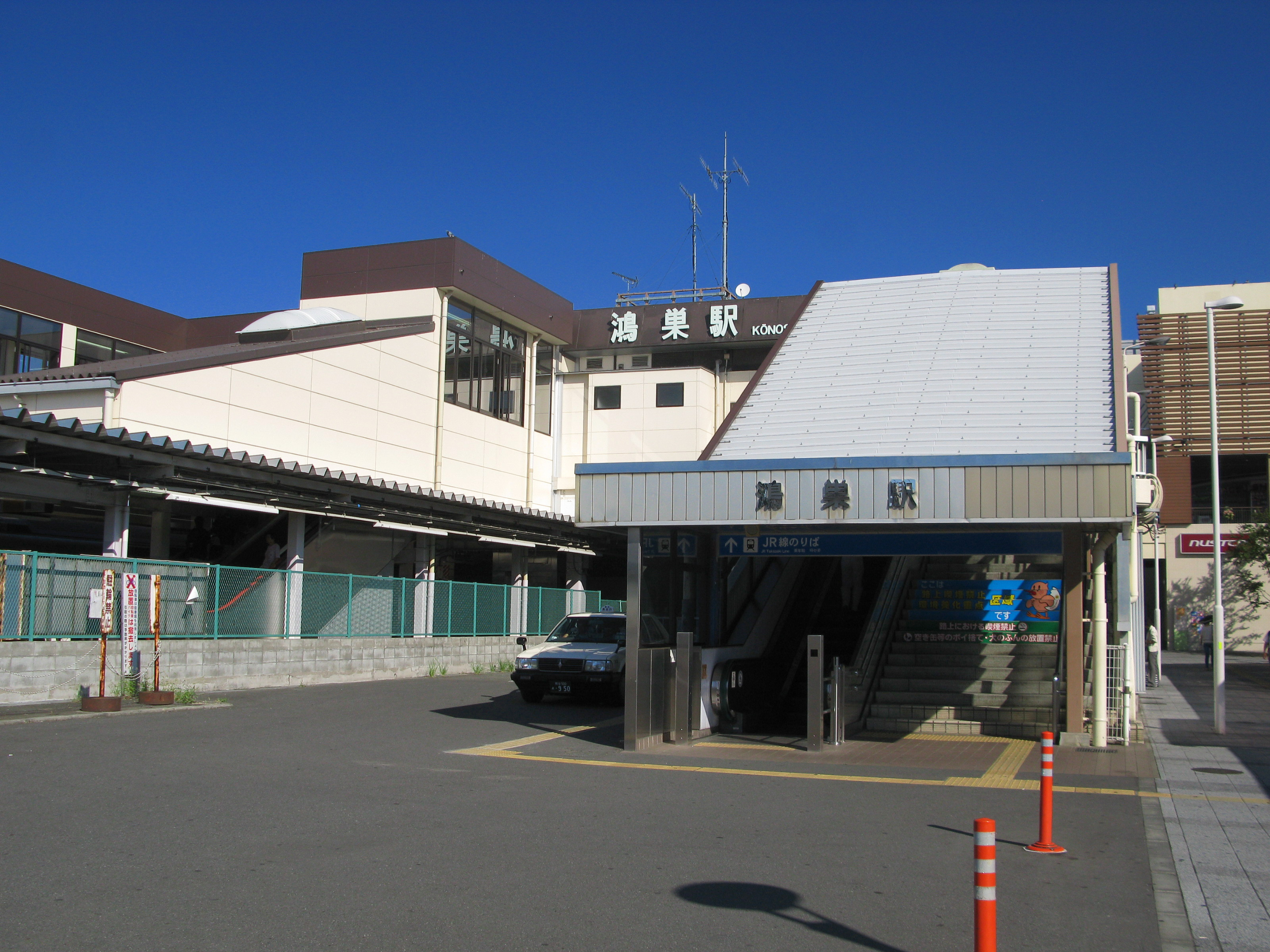
- The east entrance of Kōnosu Station in August 2012

General information
- Location: 1 Honchō, Kōnosu-shi, Saitama-ken 365-0038; Japan
- Coordinates: 36°03′33″N 139°30′35″E
- Operator: JR East
- Line: ■ Takasaki Line
- Distance: 46.9 km from Ueno
- Platforms: 1 side + 1 island platform
- Tracks: 3

Other information
- Status: Staffed (Midori no Madoguchi )
- Website: Official website

History
- Opened: 28 July 1883

Passengers
- FY2019: 19,345 daily

Services
Preceding station	JR East	Following station
Kumagaya towards Takasaki	Akagi	Kitamoto towards Ueno or Shinjuku
Kumagaya towards Takasaki	Takasaki Line Rapid Urban	Okegawa One-way operation
Kita-Kōnosu towards Maebashi	Takasaki Line Local	Kitamoto towards Tokyo
Kumagaya towards Takasaki	Shōnan–Shinjuku Line Special Rapid	Kitamoto towards Odawara
Kita-Kōnosu towards Maebashi	Shōnan–Shinjuku Line Rapid	Kitamoto towards Odawara
Location
- Location within Saitama Prefecture Location within Japan

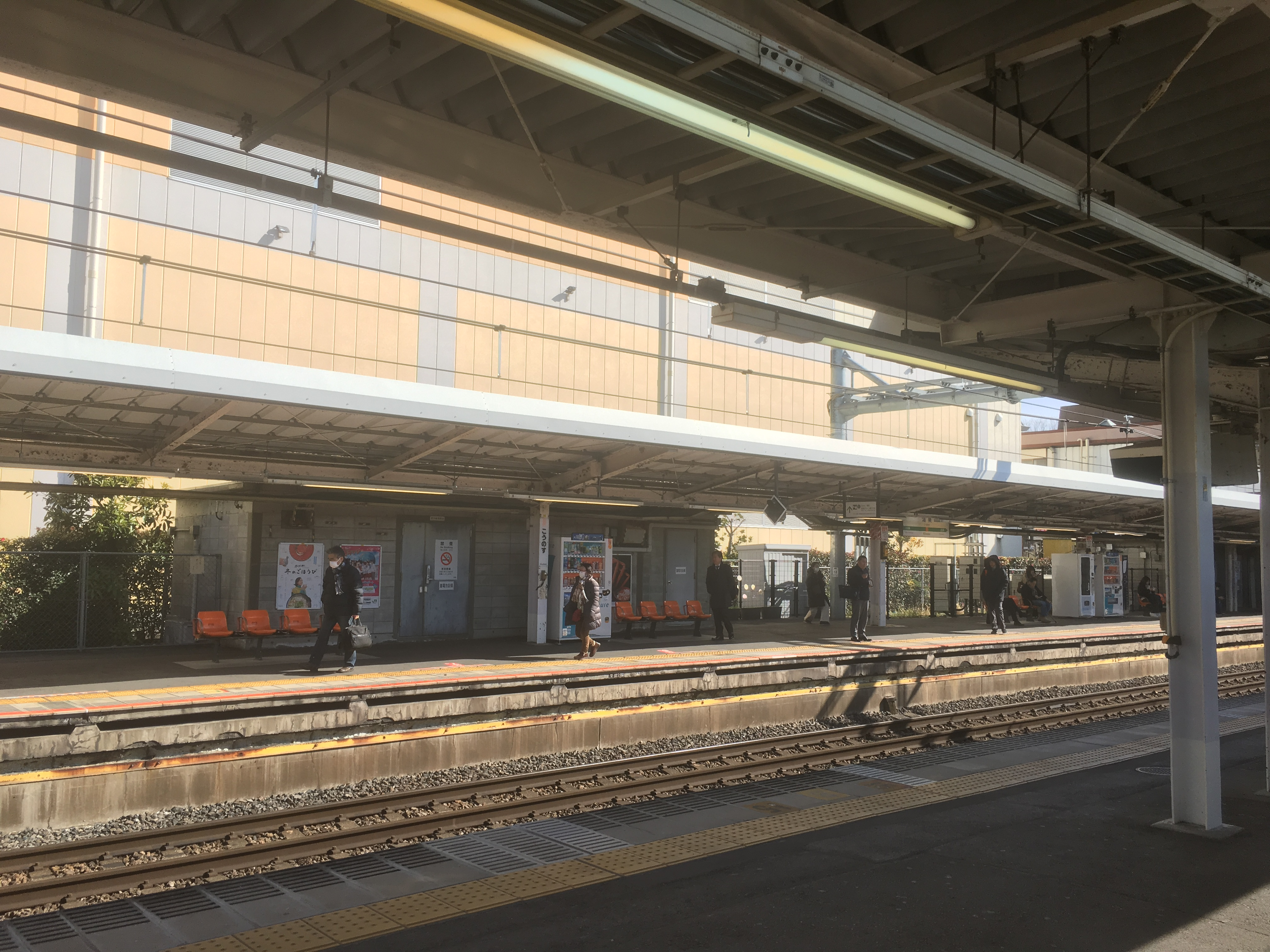
Station platforms, 2020

Kōnosu Station (鴻巣駅, Kōnosu-eki) is a passenger railway station located in the city of Kōnosu, Saitama, Japan, operated by East Japan Railway Company (JR East) .

== Lines ==
Kōnosu Station is served by the Takasaki Line, with through Shōnan-Shinjuku Line and Ueno-Tokyo Line services to and from the Tokaido Line. It is 20.0 kilometers from the nominal starting point of the Takasaki Line at Ōmiya.

== Station layout ==
The station has a side platform and an island platform serving three tracks, connected by a footbridge, with an elevated station building located above the platforms. The station has a "Midori no Madoguchi" staffed ticket office.

=== Platforms ===
1	■ Takasaki Line (Ueno-Tokyo Line)	for Ōmiya, Ueno, Tokyo, Yokohama, Atami, Numazu and Itō (via Tōkaidō Line and Ito Line)
1	■ Shōnan-Shinjuku Line	for Ōmiya, Shinjuku, Yokohama, Ōfuna, and Odawara (via Tōkaidō Line)
2	■ Takasaki Line	(not normally used)
3	■ Takasaki Line	for Kumagaya, Kagohara, Takasaki, and Maebashi

== History ==
The station opened on 28 July 1883. With the privatization of Japanese National Railways (JNR) on 1 April 1987, the station came under the control of JR East.

== Passenger statistics ==
In fiscal 2019, the station was used by an average of 19,345 passengers daily (boarding passengers only). The passenger figures for previous years are as shown below.

Fiscal year	Daily average
2000	19,290
2005	19,055
2010	19,908
2015	19,938

== Surrounding area ==
- Elumi Konosu shopping mall (adjoining station)
- Kōnosu City Hall
- Kōnosu Post Office

== See also ==
- List of railway stations in Japan
