= Maebashi-Ōshima Station =

Railway station in Maebashi, Gunma Prefecture, Japan

Maebashi-Ōshima Station 前橋大島駅
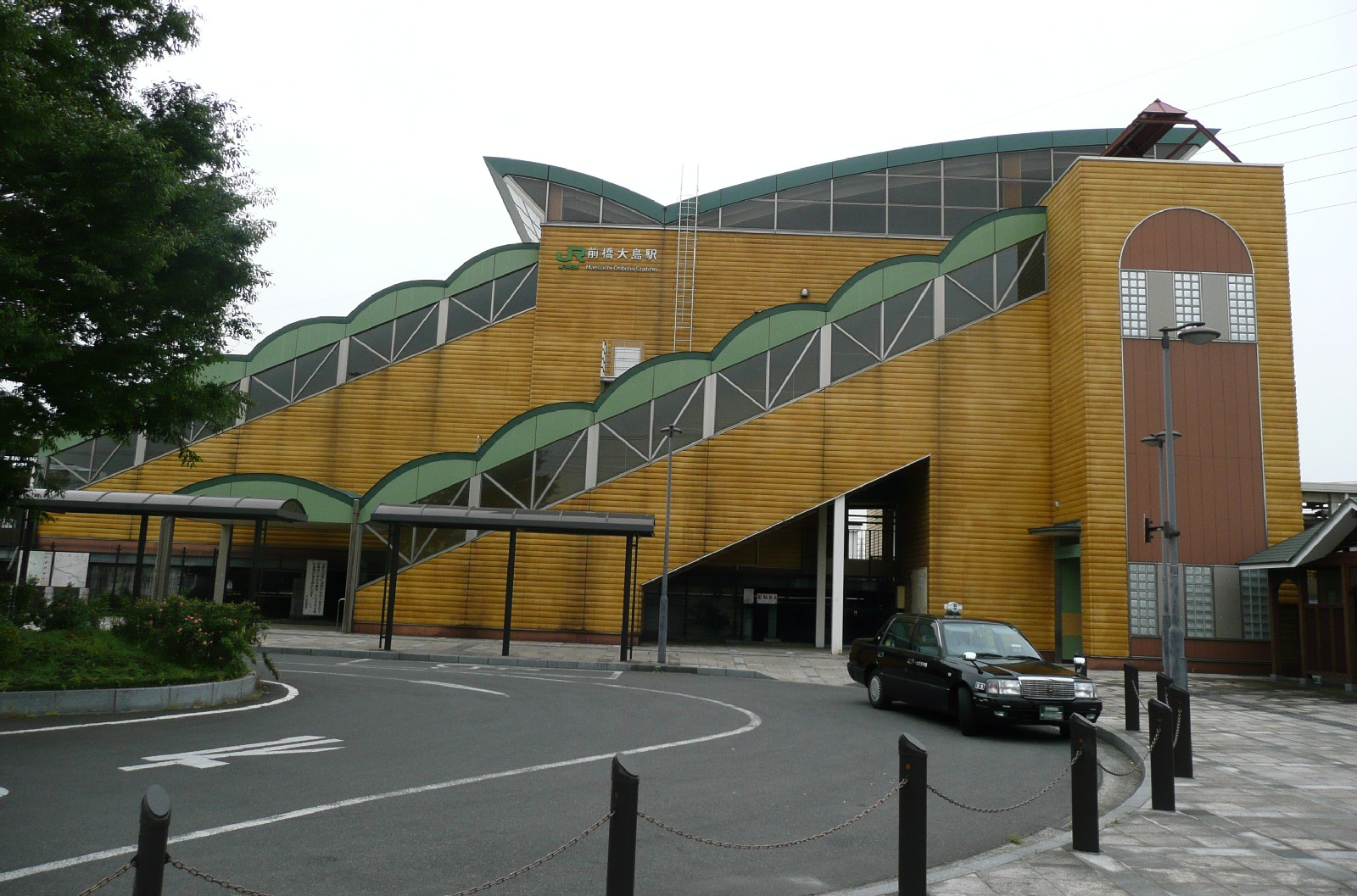
- Maebashi-Ōshima Station, May 2009

General information
- Location: Amagawa-Ōshima-machi 852, Maebashi-shi, Gunma-ken 379-2154; Japan
- Coordinates: 36.3706°N 139.1094°E
- Operator: JR East
- Line: Ryōmō Line
- Distance: 78.1 km (48.5 mi) from Oyama
- Platforms: 2 side platforms

Other information
- Status: Staffed
- Website: Official website

History
- Opened: 12 March 1999; 27 years ago

Passengers
- FY2021: 1,314 daily

Services
Preceding station	JR East	Following station
Maebashi towards Takasaki	Ryōmō Line	Komagata towards Oyama
Location
- Location within Gunma Prefecture Location within Japan

Maebashi-Ōshima Station (前橋大島駅, Maebashi-Ōshima-eki) is a passenger railway station in the city of Maebashi, Gunma Prefecture, Japan, operated by East Japan Railway Company (JR East).

== Lines ==
Maebashi-Ōshima Station is served by the Ryōmō Line and is located 78.1 km (48.5 mi) from the terminus of the line at Oyama Station, and 13.6 km (8.5 mi) from Takasaki Station. The preceding station of Komagata is 3.2 km (2.0 mi) away and the following station of Maebashi is 3.8 km (2.4 mi) away.

== Station layout ==
The station consists of two opposed side platforms connected by a footbridge. It is equipped with automatic ticket vending machines, and has several accessibility features such as escalators, elevators, mobility scooter access, a wheelchair-accessible bathroom, and a Braille fare table.

=== Platforms ===
1	■ Ryōmō Line	for Isesaki, Kiryū and Oyama
2	■ Ryōmō Line	for Maebashi, and Takasaki

== History ==
Before Maebashi-Ōshima Station was opened, another station by the name of Higashi-Maebashi was situated near current day Maebashi-Ōshima from the year 1955 to 1987.

Maebashi-Ōshima Station was opened on 12 March 1999. The Midori no Madoguchi ticket office was closed on 30 November 2021.

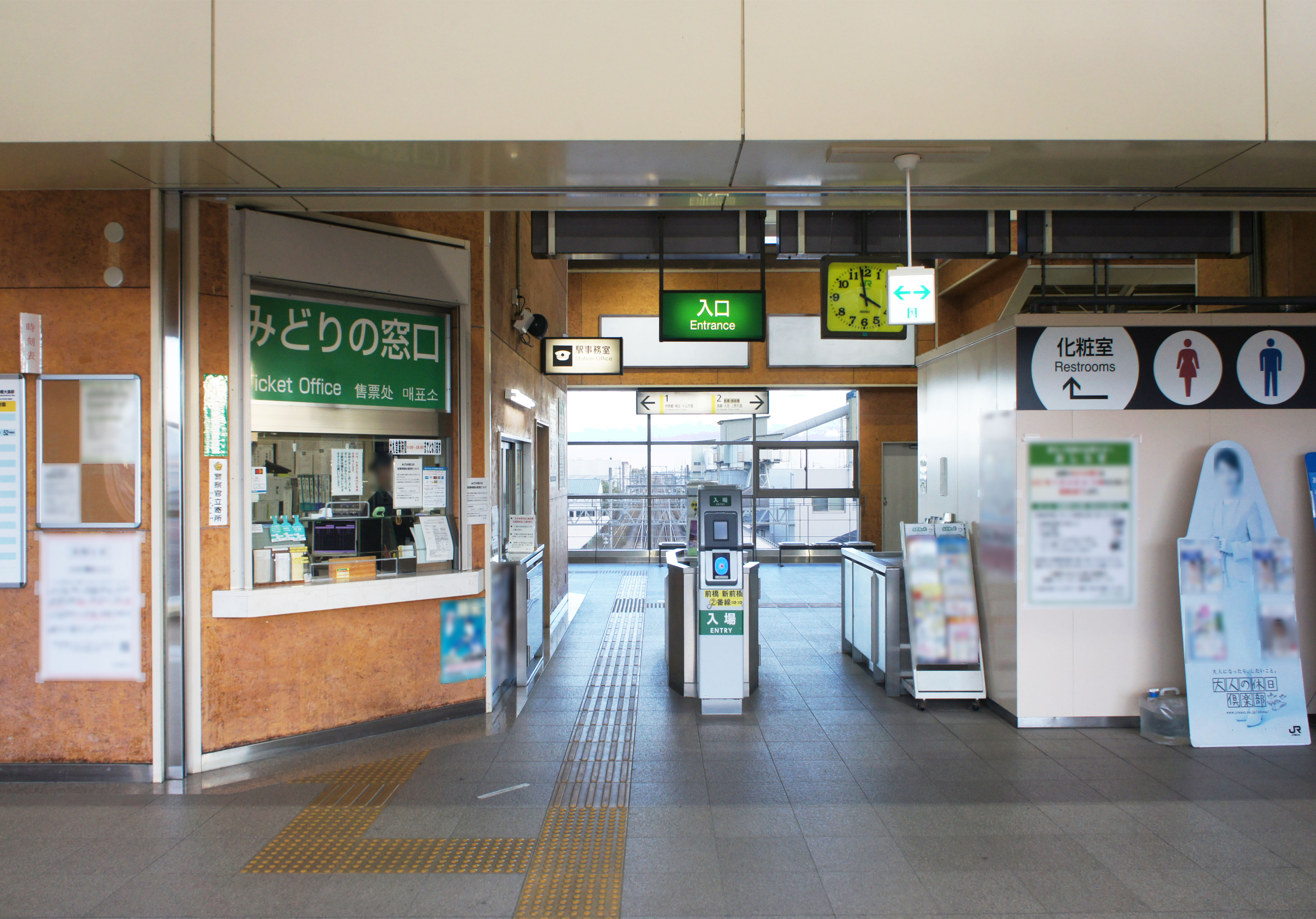
Ticket Gate November 2021

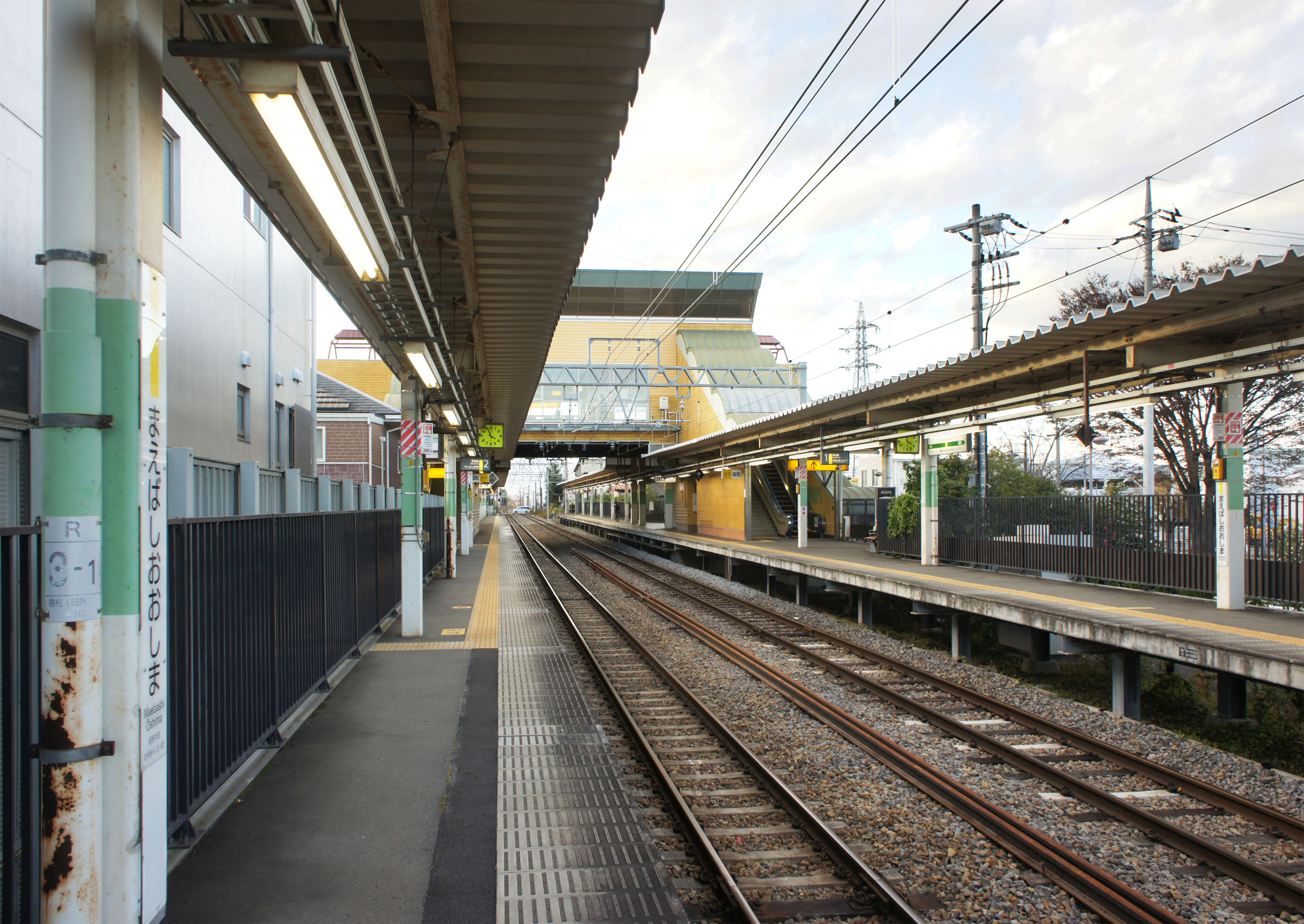
Platforms November 2021

== Passenger statistics ==
In fiscal 2021, the station was used by an average of 1,314 passengers daily (boarding passengers only).

Below is table containing the passenger statistics since the year 2000:

Passenger statistics
Year	Average Daily Boarding Passengers	Year	Average Daily Boarding Passengers	Year	Average Daily Boarding Passengers
2000	858	2010	1,513	2020	1,234
2001	1,102	2011	1,484	2021	1,314
2002	1,207	2012	1,638		
2003	1,289	2013	1,718		
2004	1,393	2014	1,604		
2005	1,502	2015	1,632		
2006	1,534	2016	1,685		
2007	1,556	2017	1,651		
2008	1,669	2018	1,661		
2009	1,593	2019	1,627		

== Surrounding area ==
- East Maebashi Industrial Park
- Amagawa-Ōshima Post Office
- Round One Maebashi
- Hachimanyama Kofun
- Hello Work Maebashi

== See also ==
- List of railway stations in Japan
