= Kitamoto Station =

Railway station in Kitamono, Saitama Prefecture, Japan

Kitamoto Station 北本駅
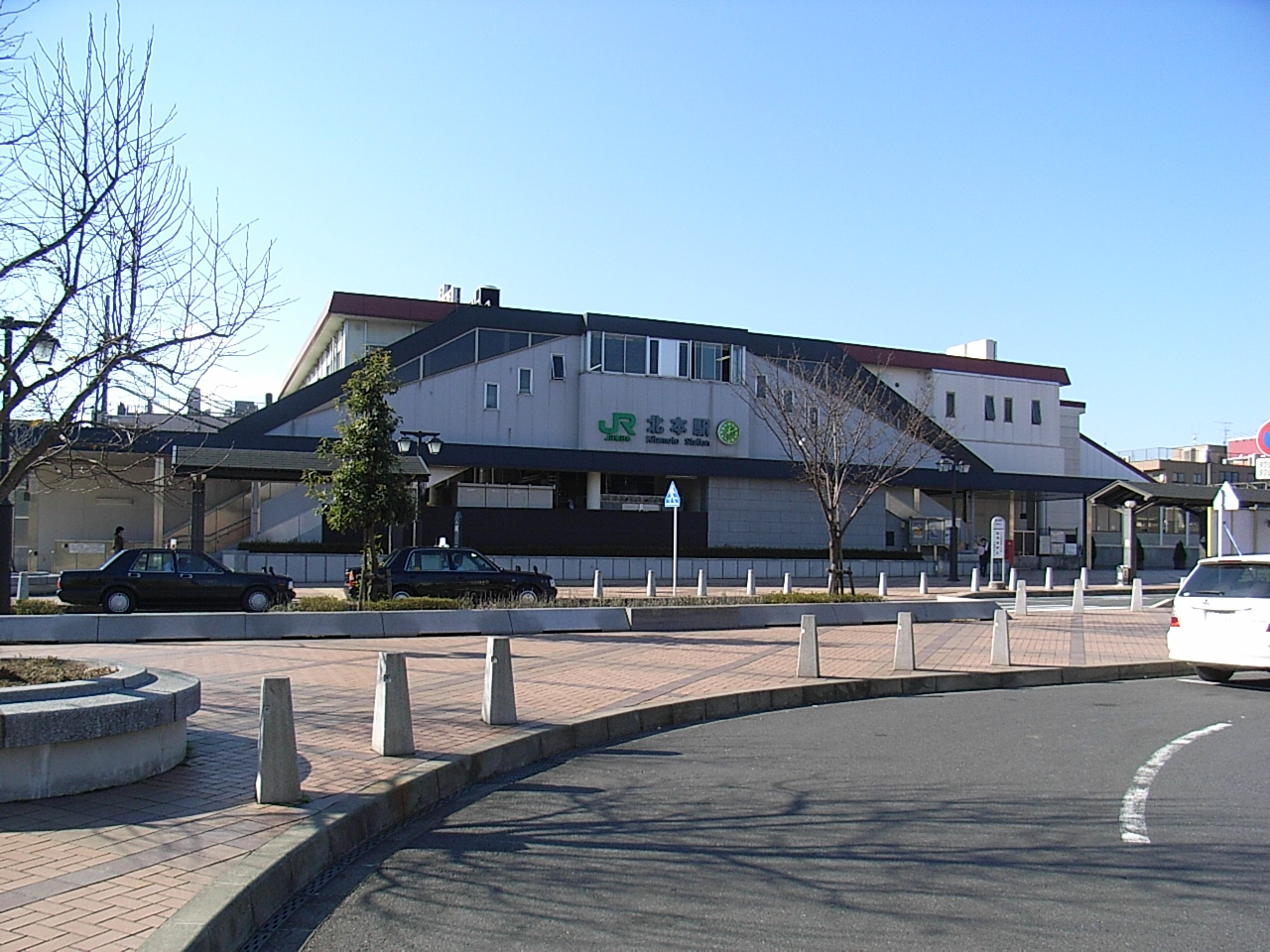
- East entrance of Kitamoto Station, 2007

General information
- Location: Kitamoto 1-12, Kitamoto-shi, Saitama-ken 364-0006; Japan
- Coordinates: 36°01′55″N 139°32′01″E
- Operator: JR East
- Line: ■ Takasaki Line
- Distance: 16.4 km from Ōmiya
- Platforms: 1 side + 2 island platforms

Other information
- Status: Staffed (Midori no Madoguchi )
- Website: Official website

History
- Opened: 1 August 1928
- Former names: Kitamurajuku (to 1961)

Passengers
- FY2019: 18,491 daily

Services
Preceding station	JR East	Following station
Kōnosu towards Takasaki	Akagi	Okegawa towards Ueno or Shinjuku
Kōnosu towards Maebashi	Takasaki Line Local	Okegawa towards Tokyo
Kōnosu towards Takasaki	Shōnan–Shinjuku Line Special Rapid	Okegawa towards Odawara
Kōnosu towards Maebashi	Shōnan–Shinjuku Line Rapid	Okegawa towards Odawara
Location
- Location within Saitama Prefecture Location within Japan

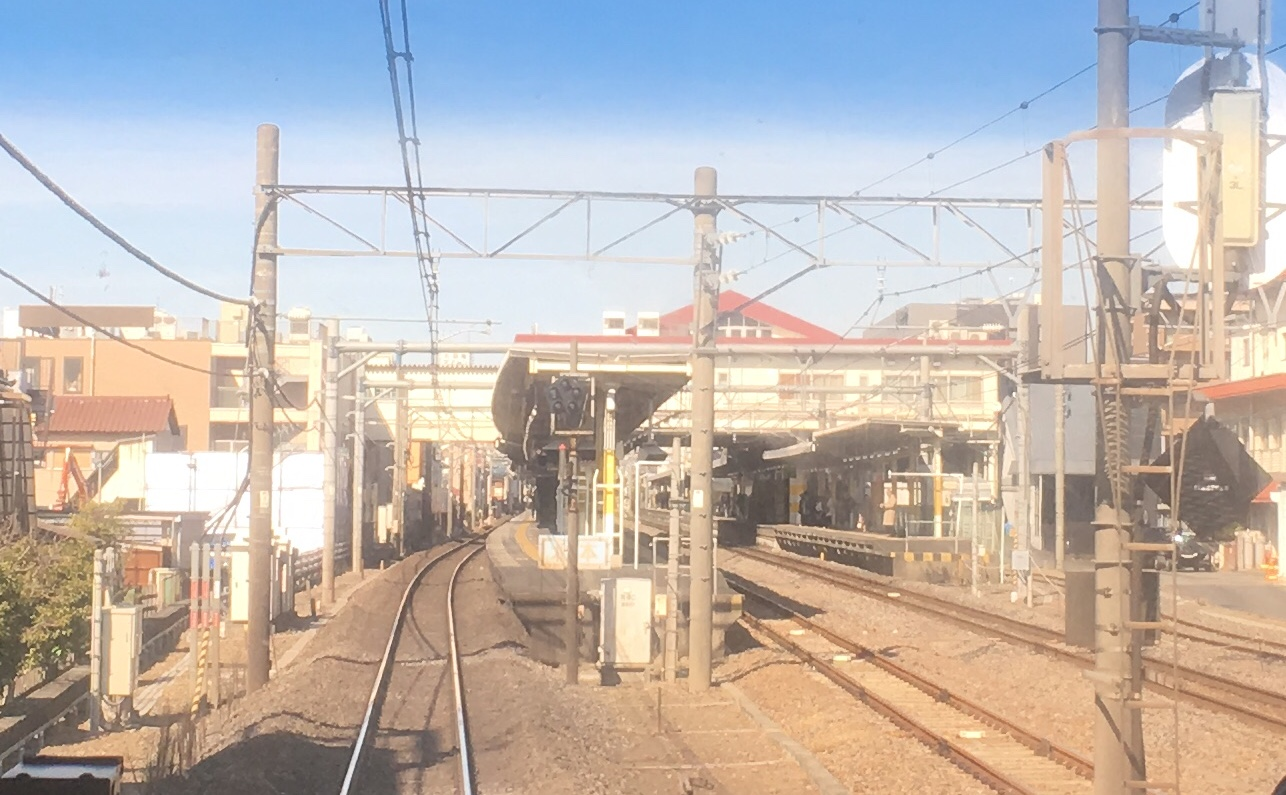
Station platforms, 2020

Kitamoto Station (北本駅, Kitamoto-eki) is a passenger railway station located in the city of Kitamoto, Saitama Prefecture, Japan, operated by East Japan Railway Company (JR East) .

== Lines ==
Kitamoto Station is served by the Takasaki Line, with through Shōnan-Shinjuku Line and Ueno-Tokyo Line services to and from the Tōkaidō Line. It is 16.4 kilometers from the nominal starting point of the Takasaki Line at Ōmiya.

== Station layout ==
The station has one side platform and one island platform serving three tracks, connected by a footbridge, with an elevated station building located above the platforms. The station has a "Midori no Madoguchi" staffed ticket office.

=== Platforms ===
1,2	■ Takasaki Line (Ueno-Tokyo Line)	for Ōmiya, Ueno, Tokyo, Yokohama, Atami, Numazu and Ito (via Tokaido Line and Ito Line)
1,2	■ Shōnan-Shinjuku Line	for Ōmiya, Shinjuku, Yokohama, Ōfuna, and Odawara (via Tokaido Line)
2,3	■ Takasaki Line	for Kumagaya, Kagohara, Takasaki, and Maebashi

== History ==
Kitamoto Station was opened on 1 August 1928 as Kitamotojuku Station (北本宿駅, Kitamotojuku eki). It was renamed to its present name on 21 March 1961. The station became part of the JR East network after the privatization of the JNR on 1 April 1987.

== Passenger statistics ==
In fiscal 2019, the station was used by an average of 18,491 passengers daily (boarding passengers only).

== Surrounding area ==
- Kitammoto City Hall
- Kitamoto Post Office
- National Route 17

== See also ==
- List of railway stations in Japan
