= Gyōda Station =

Railway station in Gyōda, Saitama Prefecture, Japan

Gyōda Station 行田駅
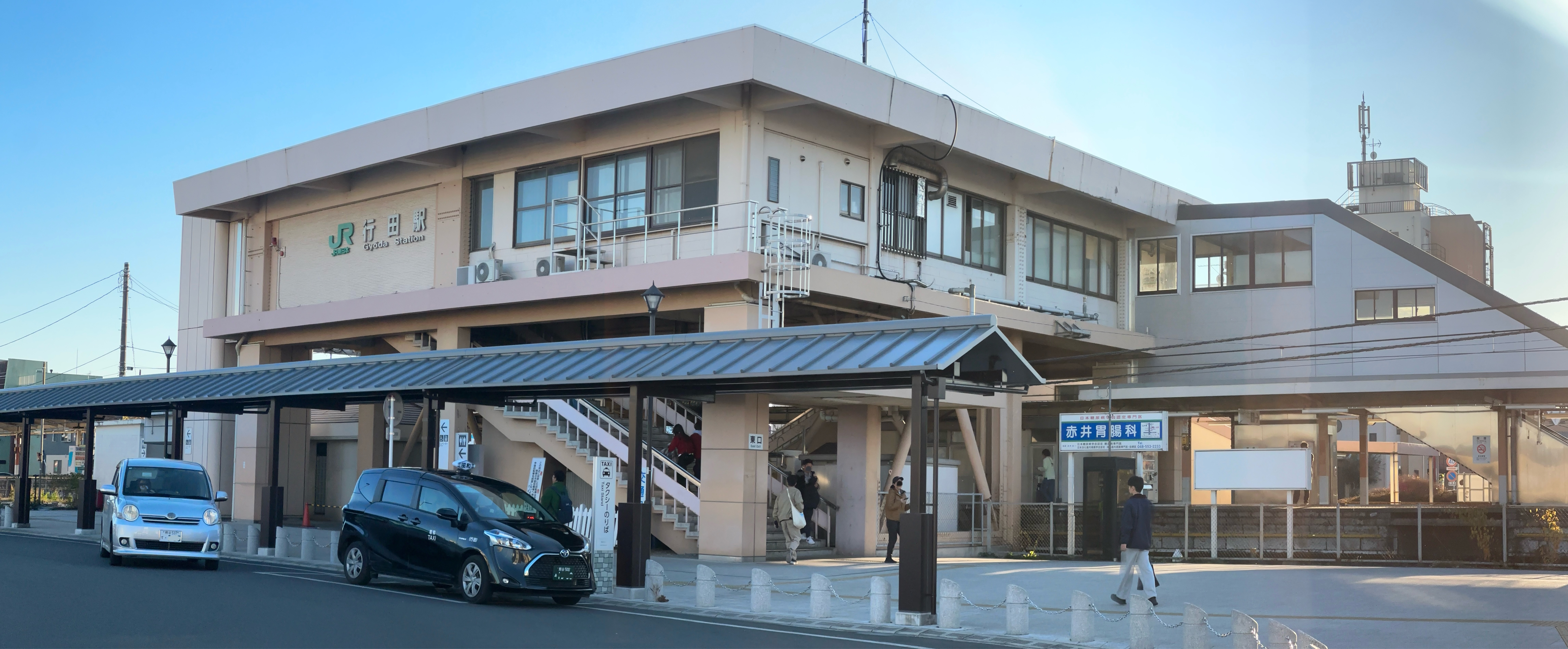
- East entrance of Gyōda Station, December 2025

General information
- Location: 12-1 Ichiriyama-cho, Gyōda-shi, Saitama-ken 361-0047; Japan
- Coordinates: 36°06′49″N 139°25′55″E
- Operator: JR East
- Line: ■ Takasaki Line Shonan-Shinjuku Line
- Platforms: 1 island platform

Other information
- Status: Staffed
- Website: Official website

History
- Opened: 1 July 1966

Passengers
- FY2019: 6569 daily

Services
Preceding station	JR East	Following station
Kumagaya towards Maebashi	Takasaki Line Local	Fukiage towards Tokyo
Kumagaya towards Maebashi	Shōnan–Shinjuku Line Rapid	Fukiage towards Odawara
Location
- Location within Saitama Prefecture Location within Japan

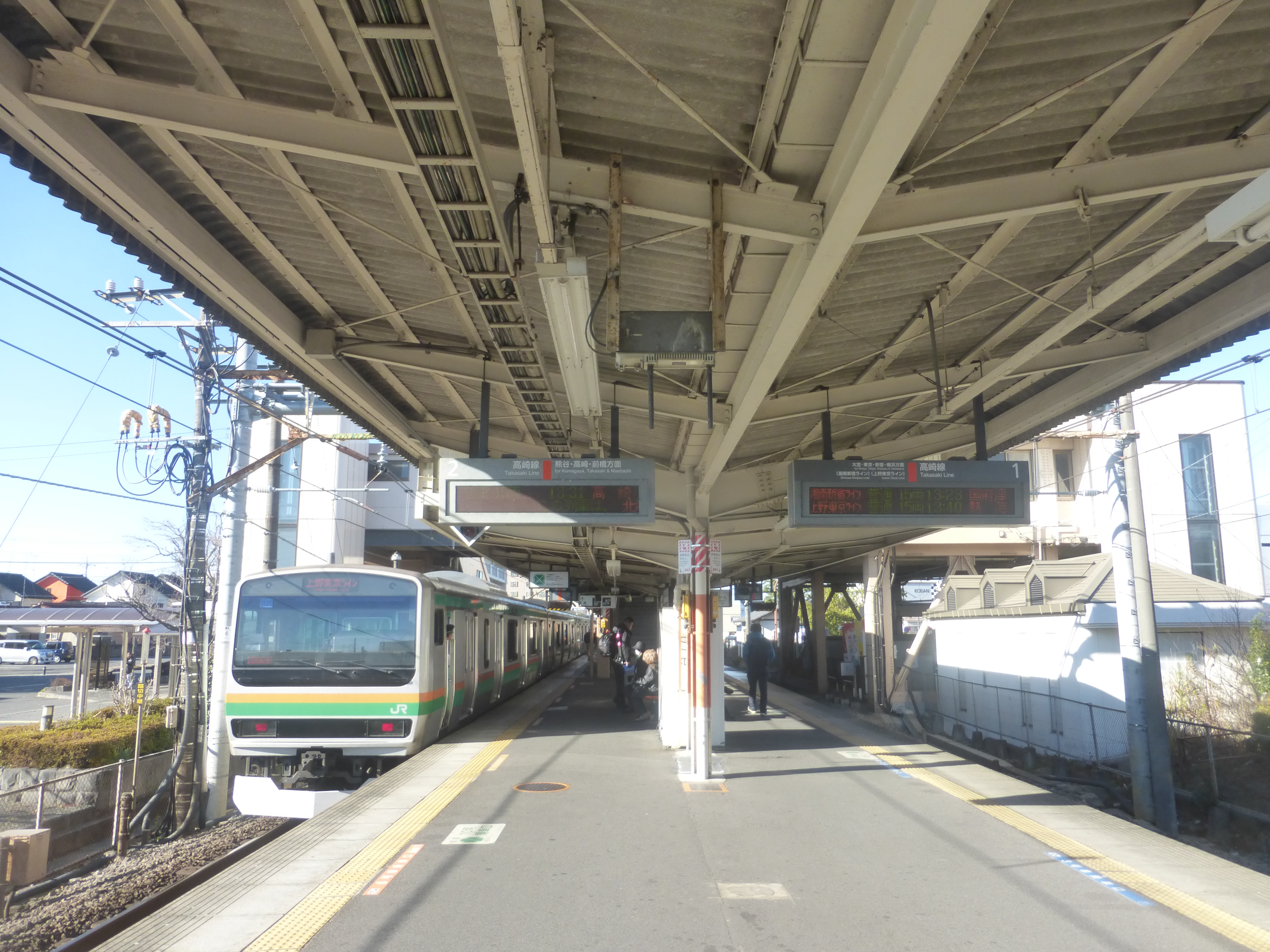
Station platforms, 2017

Gyōda Station (行田駅, Gyōda-eki) is a passenger railway station located in the city of Gyōda, Saitama, Japan, operated by East Japan Railway Company (JR East).

== Lines ==
Gyōda Station is served by the Takasaki Line, with through Shonan-Shinjuku Line and Ueno-Tokyo Line services to and from the Tokaido Line. It is 29.6 kilometers from the nominal starting point of the Takasaki Line at Ōmiya.

== Station layout ==
The station has one island platform serving two tracks, with an elevated station building located above and at a right angle to the platforms. The station is staffed.

=== Platforms ===
1	■ Takasaki Line (Ueno-Tokyo Line)	for Ōmiya, Ueno, Tokyo, Yokohama, Atami, Numazu and Ito (via Tokaido Line and Ito Line)
1	■ Shōnan-Shinjuku Line	for Ōmiya, Shinjuku, Yokohama, Ōfuna, and Odawara (via Tokaido Line)
2	■ Takasaki Line	for Kumagaya, Kagohara, Takasaki, and Maebashi

== History ==
The station opened on 1 July 1966. The station became part of the JR East network after the privatization of the JNR on 1 April 1987.

== Passenger statistics ==
In fiscal 2019, the station was used by an average of 6569 passengers daily (boarding passengers only).

== Surrounding area ==
- Gyōda City Tourist Information Center
- National Route 17

== See also ==
- List of railway stations in Japan
