= Fukiage Station (Saitama) =

Railway station in Kōnosu, Saitama Prefecture, Japan

Fukiage Station 吹上駅
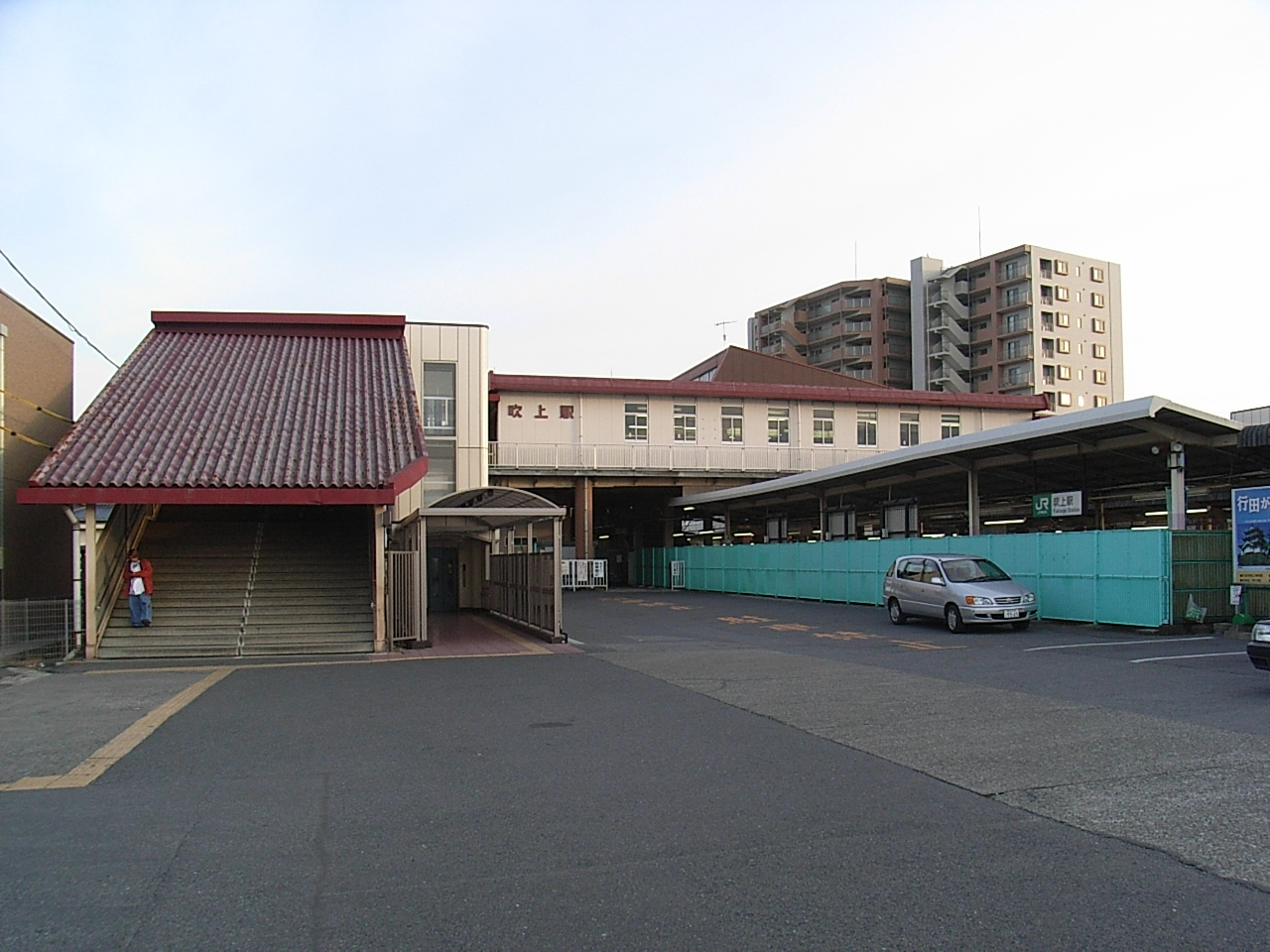
- North entrance of Fukiage Station

General information
- Location: 1-1-1 Fukiage-Honchō, Kōnosu-shi, Saitama-ken 369-0122; Japan
- Coordinates: 36°06′12″N 139°27′11″E
- Operator: JR East
- Line: ■ Takasaki Line
- Distance: 27.3 km from Ōmiya
- Platforms: 1 island + 1 side platform
- Tracks: 3

Other information
- Status: Staffed (Midori no Madoguchi )
- Website: Official website

History
- Opened: 1 March 1885

Passengers
- FY2019: 8,899 daily

Services
Preceding station	JR East	Following station
Gyōda towards Maebashi	Takasaki Line Local	Kita-Kōnosu towards Tokyo
Gyōda towards Maebashi	Shōnan–Shinjuku Line Rapid	Kita-Kōnosu towards Odawara
Location
- Location within Saitama Prefecture Location within Japan

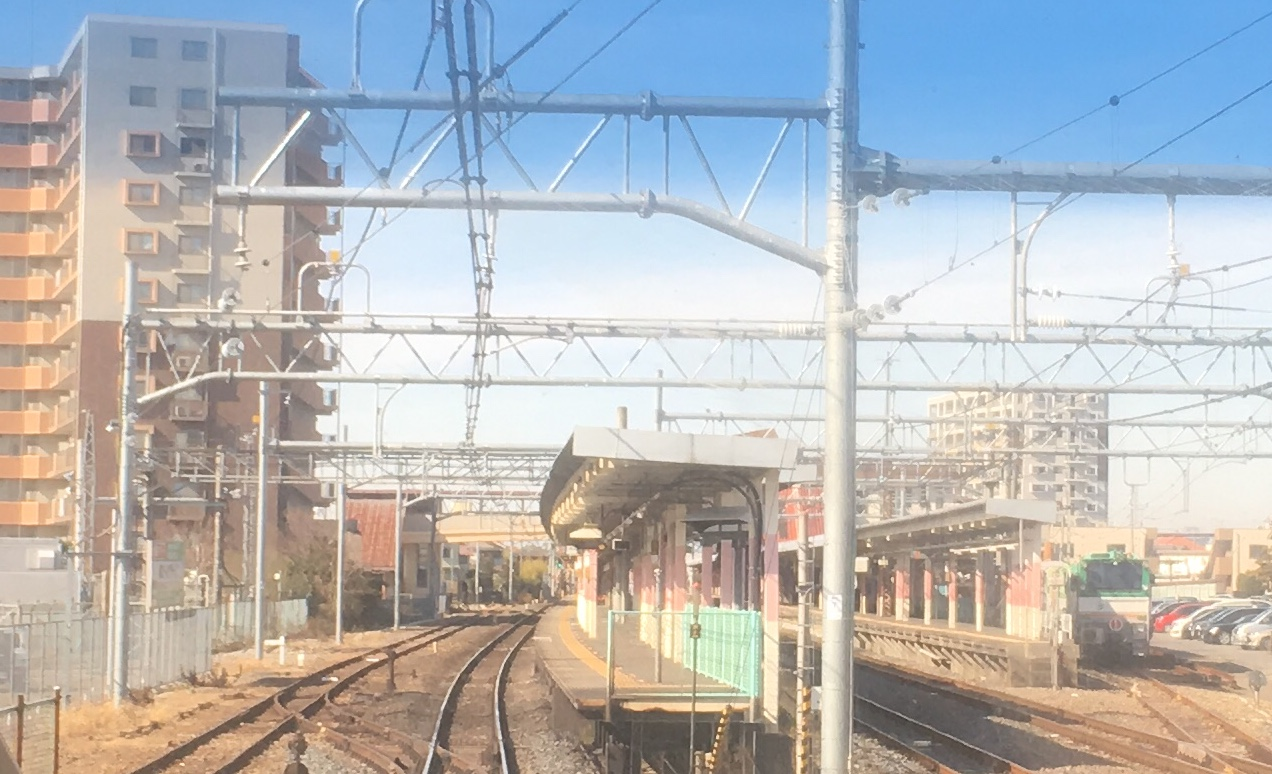
Station platforms, 2020

Fukiage Station (吹上駅, Fukiage-eki) is a passenger railway station located in the city of Kōnosu, Saitama, Japan, operated by East Japan Railway Company (JR East) .

== Lines ==
Fukiage Station is served by the Takasaki Line, with through Shōnan-Shinjuku Line and Ueno-Tokyo Line services to and from the Tōkaidō Line. It is 27.3 kilometers from the nominal starting point of the Takasaki Line at Ōmiya.

== Station layout ==
The station has a side platform and an island platform serving three tracks, connected by a footbridge, with an elevated station building located above the platforms. The station has a "Midori no Madoguchi" staffed ticket office.

=== Platforms ===
1,2	■ Takasaki Line (Ueno-Tokyo Line)	for Ōmiya, Ueno, Tokyo, Yokohama, Atami, Numazu and Itō (via Tokaido Line and Ito Line)
1,2	■ Shōnan-Shinjuku Line	for Ōmiya, Shinjuku, Yokohama, Ōfuna, and Odawara (via Tokaido Line)
2,3	■ Takasaki Line	for Kumagaya, Kagohara, Takasaki, and Maebashi

== History ==
The station opened on 1 March 1885. The station became part of the JR East network after the privatization of the JNR on 1 April 1987.

== Passenger statistics ==
In fiscal 2019, the station was used by an average of 8,899 passengers daily (boarding passengers only).

== Surrounding area ==
- Fukiage Post Office
- former Fukiage Town Hall

== See also ==
- List of railway stations in Japan
