= Hachimanyama Kofun (Maebashi) =

Kofun period burial mount in Maebashi, Kantō, Japan

- 八幡山古墳 (Japanese)
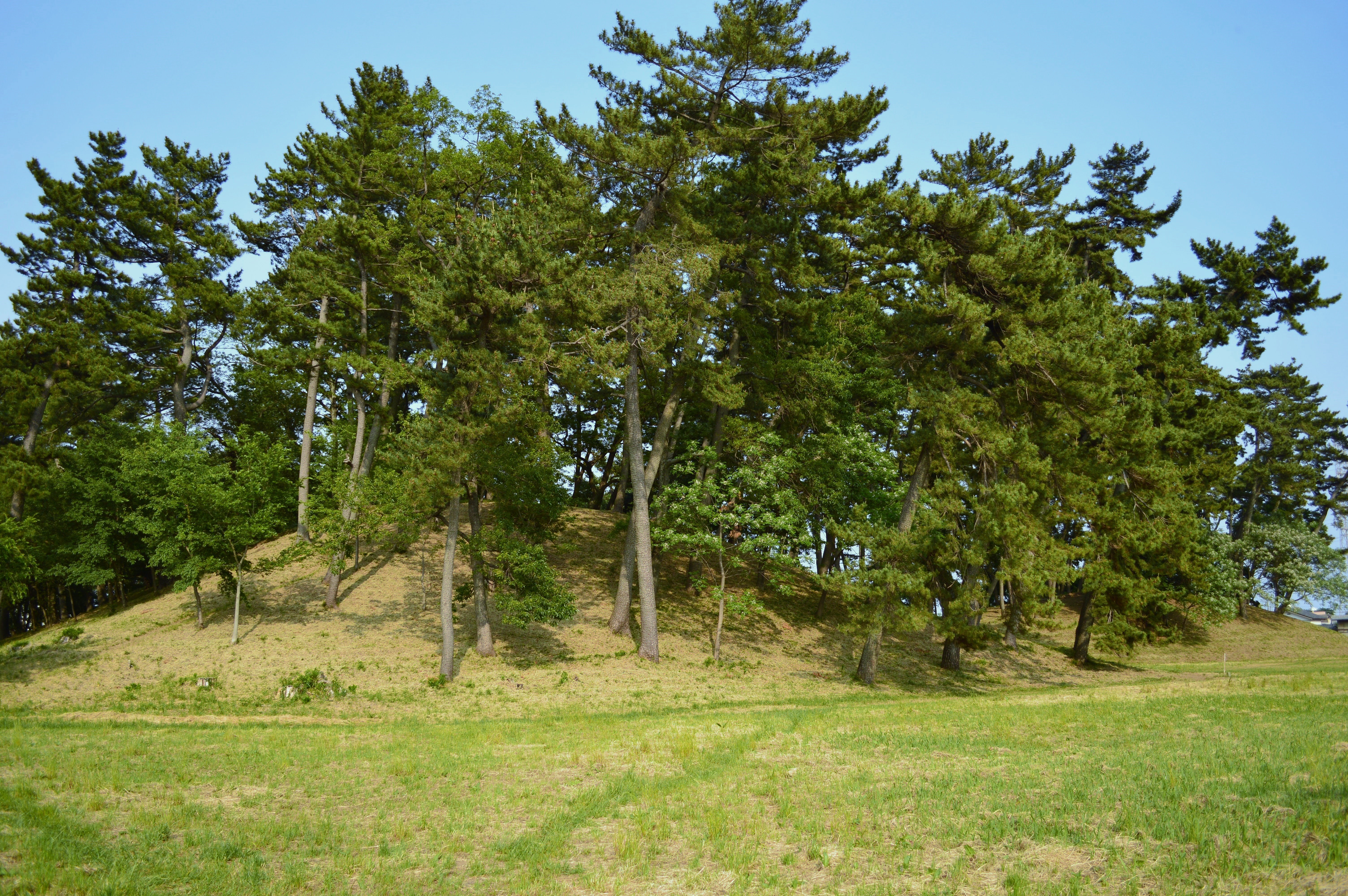
- Hachimanyama Kofun

- Hachimanyama Kofun Hachimanyama Kofun (Maebashi) (Japan)
- 36°22′01″N 139°06′04″E
- Type: kofun
- Periods: Kofun period
- Location: Maebashi, Gunma, Japan
- Region: Kantō region

History
- Built: late 4th century

Site notes
- Public access: Yes (Park)

The Hachimanyama Kofun (八幡山古墳) is a Kofun period burial mound located in what is now the Asakura neighborhood of the city of Maebashi, Gunma Prefecture in the northern Kantō region of Japan. It was designated a National Historic Site of Japan in 1949. It is one of the Asakura-Hirose Kofun Cluster of over 150 tumuli from the 4th to 6th century in the foothills of Mount Akagi, which also includes the Maebashi Futagoyama Kofun.

== Overview ==
The Hachimanyama Kofun is located almost parallel to the right bank of the Hirose River, and is orientated facing southeast. It is a zenpō-kōen-fun (前方後円墳), which is shaped like a keyhole, having one square end and one circular end, when viewed from above, with a total length of 130 meters, making it one of the largest in the Kantō region. It can be dated to the latter half of the 4th century AD due to a layer of pumice ash that was deposited by an eruption of Mount Asama found under the tumulus. The surface was originally covered in fukiishi, some of which towards the bottom of the mound are unusually large. No haniwa have been uncovered. The tumulus appears to have had a shallow moat with a width of 25 to 30 meters. Although the detailed structure of the mound has not been investigated yet, it is believed to have a gravel-lined burial chamber. Due to finds in ongoing investigations, the area covered by the National Historic Site designation was extended in 1980, again in 2003, and again in 2020.

Total length
130 meters
Anterior rectangular portion
59 meters wide, 8 meters high
Posterior circular portion
72 meter diameter x 12 meters high

== See also ==
- List of Historic Sites of Japan (Gunma)
