= Kyoai Gakuen University =

Private university in Maebashi, Gunma, Japan

Coordinates: 36°21′32.8″N 139°8′40″E

- 共愛学園前橋国際大学
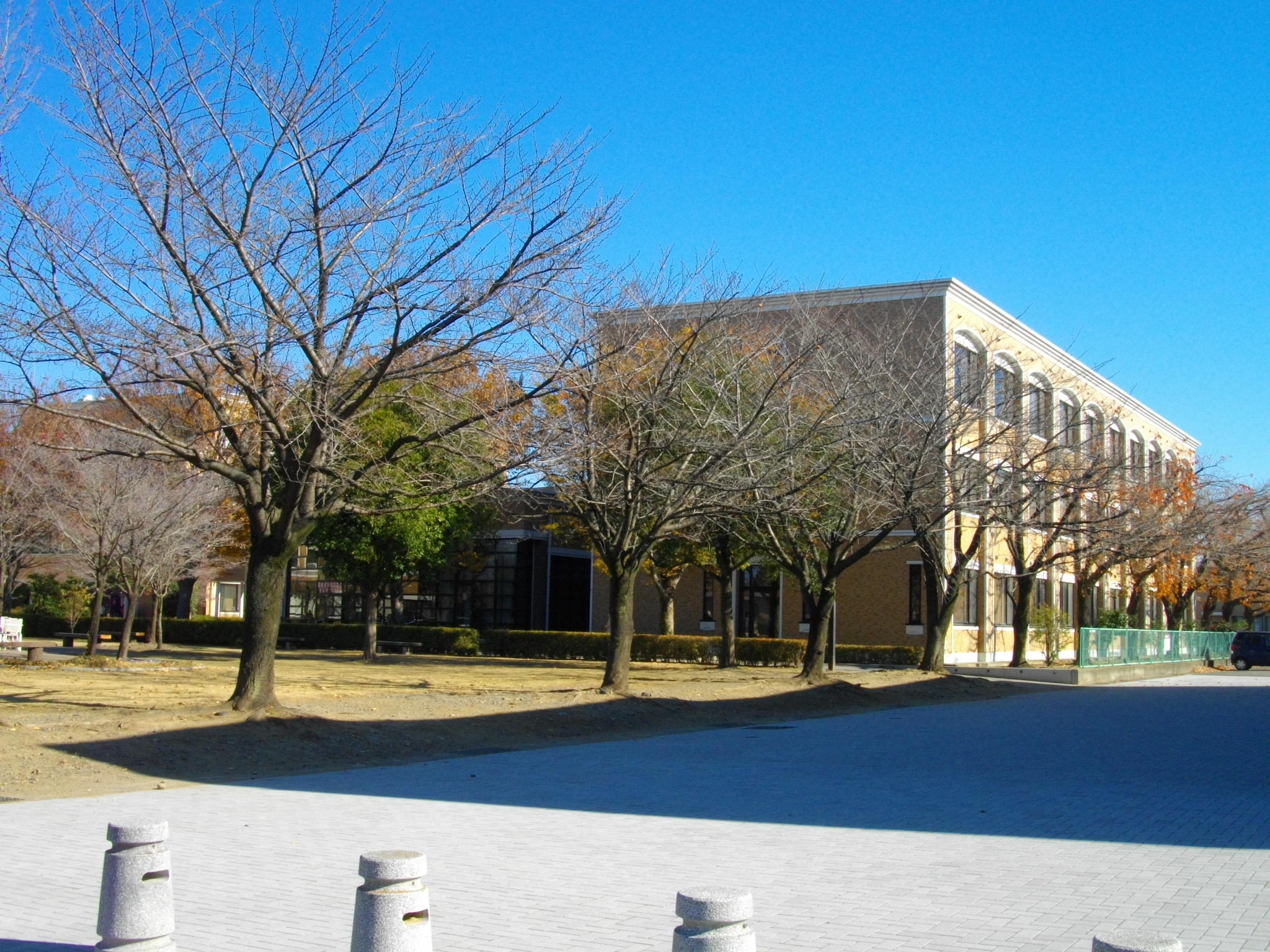
- Type: Private
- Established: Founded 1988; Chartered 1999
- Location: Maebashi, Gunma, Japan
- Website: Official website

Kyoai Gakuen University (共愛学園前橋国際大学, Kyōai gakuen maebashi kokusai daigaku), formerly Maebashi Kyoai Gakuen College, is a private university in Maebashi, Gunma, Japan. The predecessor of the school, a women's school, was founded in 1888, and it was chartered as a junior college in 1988. In 1999 the school became a co-educational four-year college. The college is associated with the United Church of Christ in Japan.
