= Daishi Hokuetsu Bank =

Japanese bank

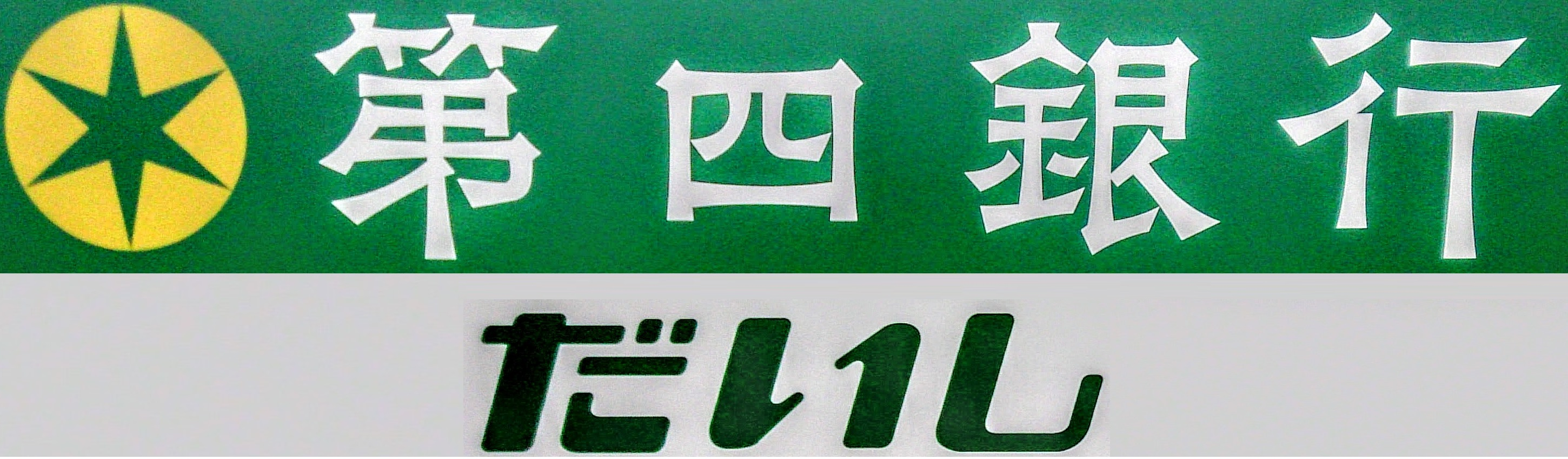

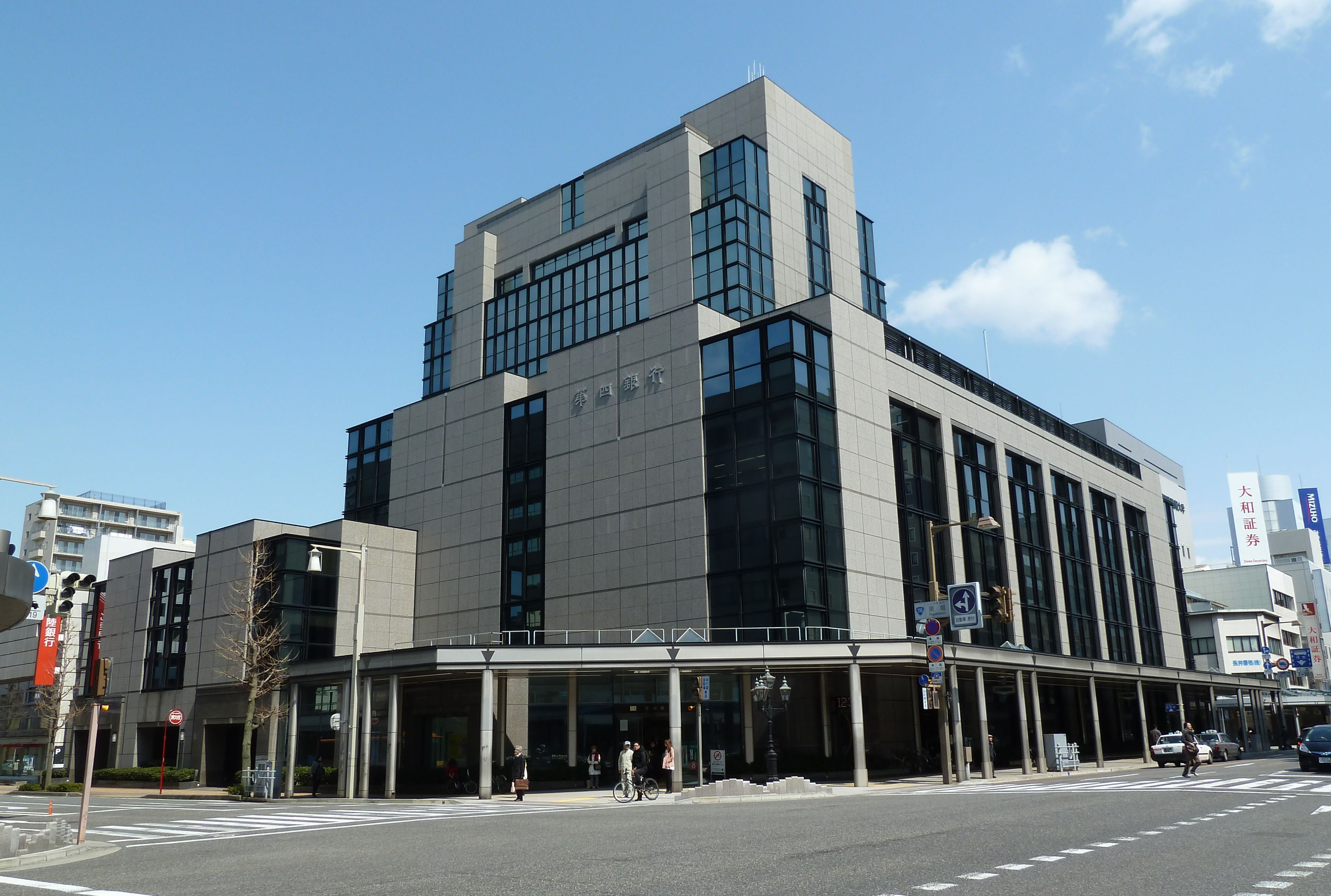
- Native name: 第四北越銀行
- Industry: Financial services
- Founded: 1873
- Headquarters: 1071-1 Shichiban-cho, Higashiborimae-dori, Niigata, Niigata Prefecture, Japan
- Key people: Takeshi Namiki Fujio
- Website: www.dhbk.co.jp/english/

Daishi Hokuetsu Bank (Japanese: 第四北越銀行) is a Niigata-based Japanese regional bank created by the 2021 merger of The Daishi Bank (Japanese: 第四銀行, lit. 'The Fourth Bank') and Hokuetsu Bank (Japanese: 北越銀行).

== History ==
The Daishi Bank was founded and established in Niigata.

In October 2008, The Daishi Bank, jointly with Chiba Bank and Hokkoku Bank, hired IBM to build a Call Center System common for the three banks.
