= Maebashi Station =

Railway station in Maebashi, Gunma Prefecture, Japan

Maebashi Station 前橋駅
- Maebashi Station, North exit, October 2026

General information
- Location: 2 Omotechō, Maebashi-shi, Gunma-ken 371-0024; Japan
- Coordinates: 36.3837°N 139.0735°E
- Operator: JR East
- Line: Ryōmō Line
- Distance: 81.9 kilometres (50.9 mi) from Oyama
- Platforms: 2 island platforms

Other information
- Status: Staffed (Midori no Madoguchi)
- Website: Official website

History
- Opened: 20 November 1889; 136 years ago

Passengers
- FY2021: 7,901 daily

Services
Preceding station	JR East	Following station
Shin-Maebashi towards Tokyo	Takasaki Line Local; Ryōmō Line through-service	Terminus
Shin-Maebashi towards Odawara	Shōnan–Shinjuku Line Rapid	Terminus
Shin-Maebashi towards Takasaki	Ryōmō Line	Maebashi-Ōshima towards Oyama
Location
- Location within Gunma Prefecture Location within Japan

Maebashi Station (前橋駅, Maebashi-eki) is a passenger railway station in the city of Maebashi, Gunma Prefecture, Japan, operated by East Japan Railway Company (JR East). It is one of two main railway stations of central Maebashi; the other is Chūō Maebashi Station of the private railway operator Jōmō Electric Railway. In 2020, the station was renovated into an "Ecoste" station, a station with a focus on environmental conservation.

== Synopsis ==
Maebashi Station is the main station for the city of Maebashi, which is the prefectural capital city of Gunma Prefecture. Even though it is the main station of the capital city of Gunma, its lack of important train lines (Such as Shinkansen, Takasaki Line, Joetsu Line) make Takasaki Station the most important station in Gunma Prefecture. In addition, despite being the main station of Maebashi, Chūō Maebashi Station is closer to the city center.

== Lines ==
Maebashi Station is served by the Ryōmō Line, and is located 81.9 km (50.9 mi) from the starting point of the line at Oyama Station, and 9.8 km (6.1 mi) from Takasaki Station. The preceding station of Maebashi-Ōshima is 5.8 km (3.6 mi) away and the following station of Shin-Maebashi is 3.2 km (2.0 mi) away. Some Shōnan–Shinjuku Line and Ueno–Tokyo Line services also originate at this station.

== Station layout ==
The station consists of two elevated island platforms serving three tracks, with the station building underneath. The station has coin lockers and a Midori no Madoguchi ticket office. It has many accessibility features such as escalators, elevators, mobility scooter access, wheelchair-accessible bathrooms, and a Braille fare table.

Ticket Gate October 2026

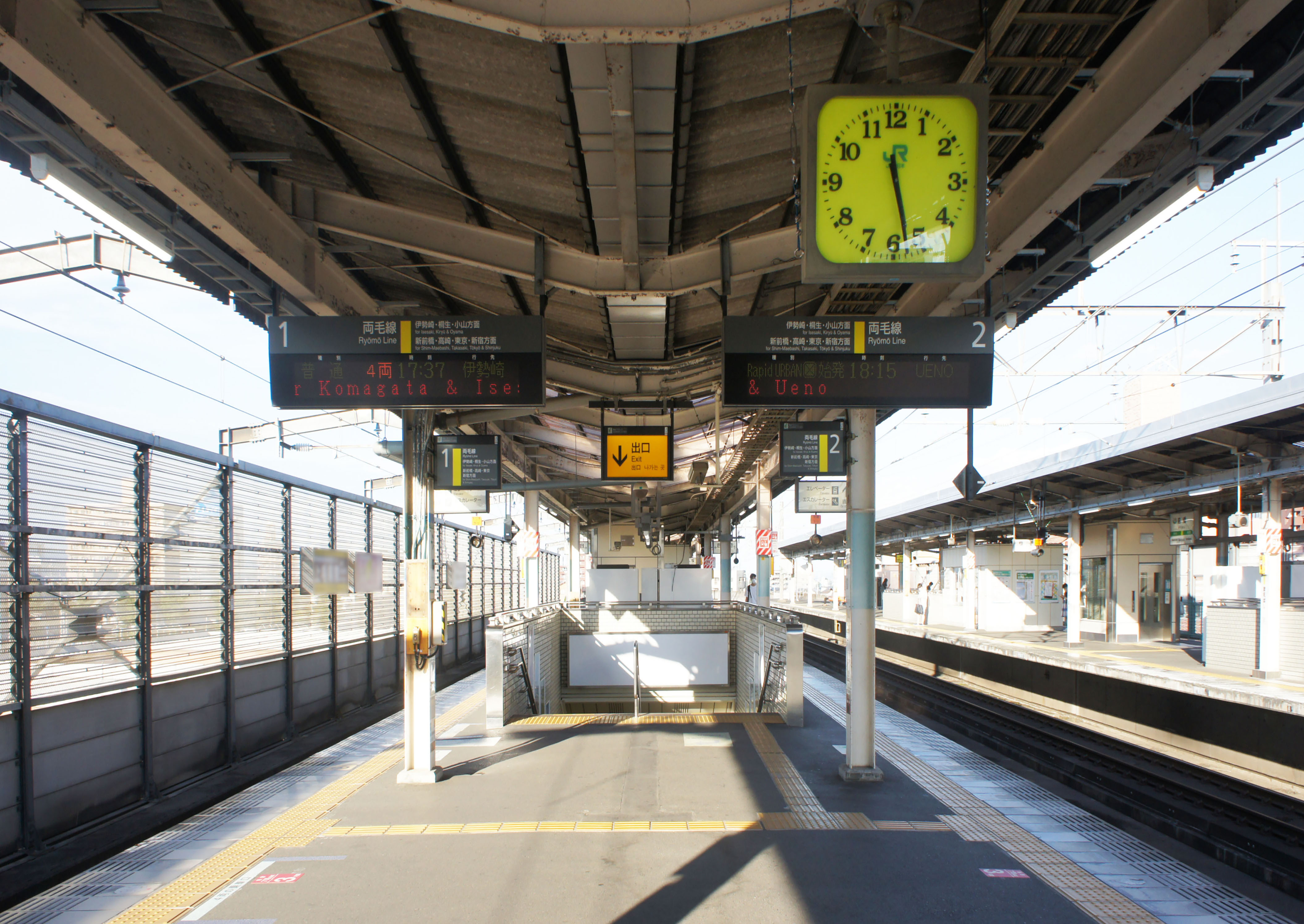
Platforms 1 and 2 July 2021

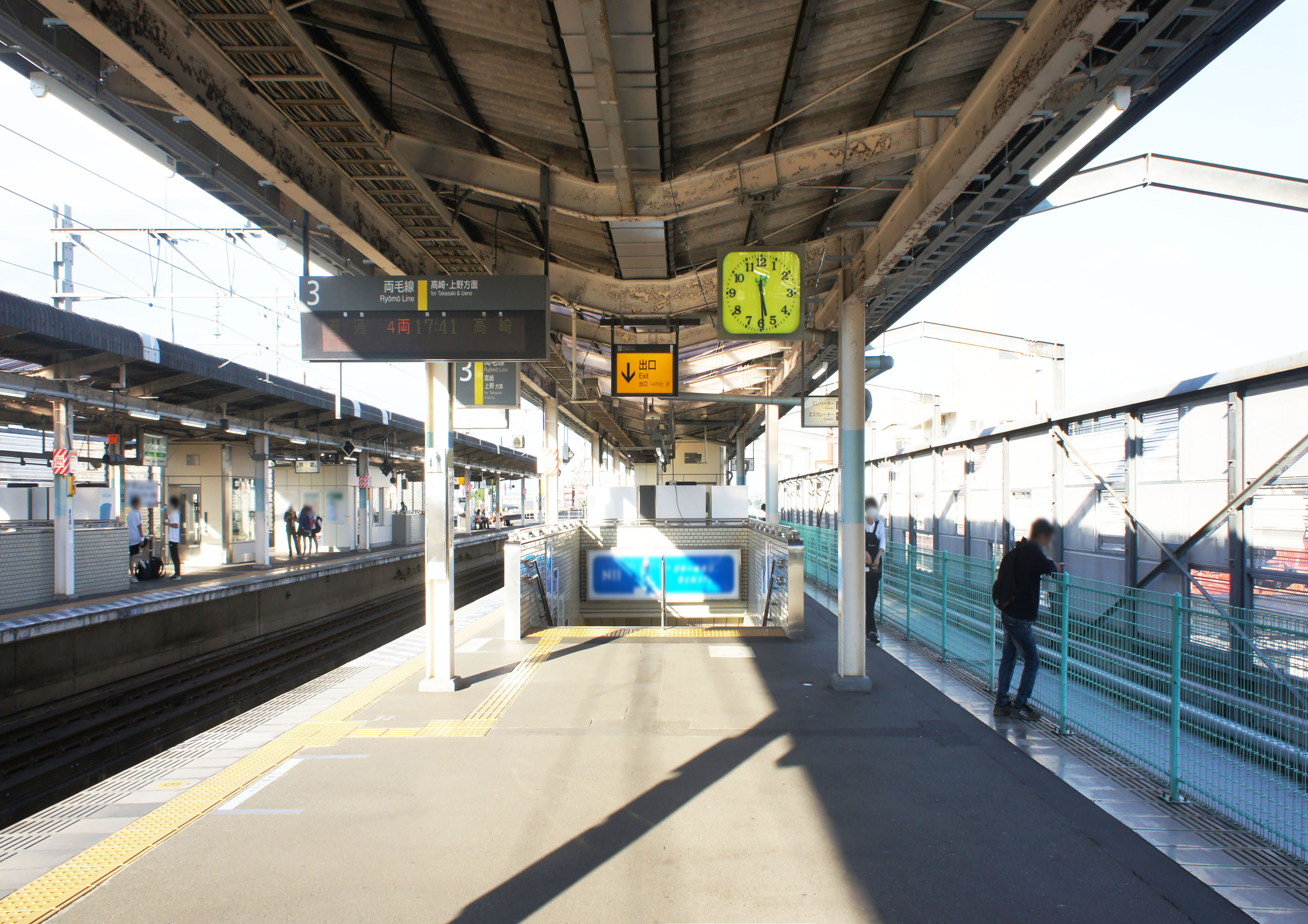
Platform 3 July 2021

=== Platforms ===
1; 2	■ Ryōmō Line	for Isesaki, Kiryū, and Oyama
1; 2	Shōnan–Shinjuku Line	for Takasaki and Shinjuku
1; 2	Takasaki Line via (Ueno–Tokyo Line)	for Takasaki and Tokyo
3	■ Ryōmō Line	for Takasaki

=== Station facilities ===
- VIEW ALTTE (JR East ATM)
- NewDays Maebashi
- Bakery
- E'site Maebashi
  - McDonald's JR Maebashi Station
  - VentoMaebashi
  - Maebashi Station Tourist Information Center
  - Maebashi Station Bus Information Center
  - Pizzeria Pesca JR Maebashi Station South Exit
  - Gunma Bank, Towa Bank ATM corner

== History ==
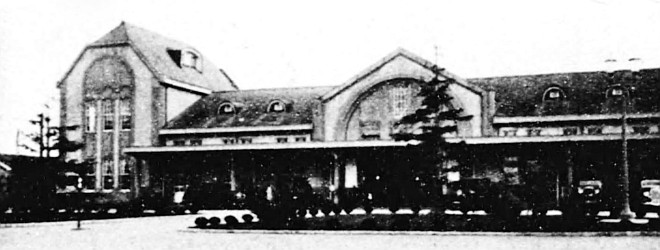
Maebashi Station in the early 20th century

Maebashi Station was opened by Ryōmō Railway on November 20, 1889. From August 20, 1884, Nippon Railway operated another Maebashi Station on the other side of the Tone River, but this station was closed on December 26, 1889, when a bridge across the river was completed and Nippon Railway trains began sharing the Ryōmō Railway station. Ryōmō Railway was merged into Nippon Railway on January 1, 1897, and Nippon Railway was nationalized on November 1, 1906.

The station started accepting Suica cards on November 18, 2001.

In 2020, the station was renovated under the "Ecoste" model. The goal was to reduce CO_{2} emissions by 69 tons (roughly 24% from 2016).

In the past, Maebashi was one of the origin stations for the Akagi limited express service to Tokyo's Ueno or Shinjuku stations. However, since 13 March 2021, all Akagi services stop at Takasaki instead of continuing on to Maebashi.

== Passenger statistics ==
In fiscal 2021, the station was used by an average of 7,901 passengers daily (boarding passengers only).

The table below shows passenger statistics since the year 2000:

Passenger statistics
Year	Average Daily Boarding Passengers	Year	Average Daily Boarding Passengers	Year	Average Daily Boarding Passengers
2000	10,593	2010	9,422	2020	7,304
2001	10,334	2011	9,294	2021	7,901
2002	10,011	2012	9,693		
2003	9,961	2013	10,107		
2004	9,742	2014	10,035		
2005	9,571	2015	10,188		
2006	9,511	2016	10,353		
2007	9,607	2017	10,490		
2008	9,853	2018	10,682		
2009	9,567	2019	10,511		

== Surrounding area ==
=== North exit ===
- Taxi stand
- Aquel Maebashi
- ORIX car rental
- Mitsubishi UFJ Securities Maebashi Branch
- Towa Bank Head Office Sales Department
- Sumitomo Mitsui Bank Maebashi Branch
- Mizuho Bank Maebashi Branch
- Resona Bank Maebashi Branch
- Ashikaga bank Maebashi Branch
- Tochigi Bank Maebashi Branch
- Yokohama Bank Maebashi Branch
- Taiko Bank Maebashi Branch
- Mizuho Trust & Banking Maebashi Branch
- Sumitomo Mitsui Trust Bank Maebashi Branch
- Maebashi Omotemachi Post Office
- Maebashi Police Station Ekimae Koban
- La Fontaine (Wedding Hall)
- Daishi Hokuetsu Bank Maebashi Higashi Branch

=== South Exit ===
- Taxi stand
- Toyoko Inn Maebashi Ekimae
- Chuo Sogo Gakuin Vocational Education Center
- Maebashi Civic Cultural Center
- Maebashi Bunka Fashion College
- TEPCO Maebashi branch office
- Gunma Bank Maebashi Station South Branch
- Maebashi Minamimachi Post Office
- Gunma Red Cross Blood Center Blood Donation Room Maebashi Heartland (Daido Seimei Building 1F)
- Gunma Nikken Technical College
- Keyaki Walk Maebashi

== Bus Terminal ==
=== North Exit Bus Rotary ===
Bus stand	Direction	Operating Companies	Destination
1	Towards Gunma Prefectural Office and Maebashi Park	Kanetsu Transportation	Maebashi Park, Shikishima Park Bus Terminal
1	Towards Gunma Prefectural Office and Maebashi Park	Nippon Chuo Bus	Maebashi Park, Shikishima Park Bus Terminal
1	Towards Gunma Prefectural Office and Maebashi Park	Nagai Transport	Maebashi Park
2	Towards Shibukawa and Gundai Hospital	Kanetsu Transportation	Shibukawa Station, Pediatric Medical Center, Gunma University Aramaki Campus, Gundai Hospital
3	Towards Shikishima park, Gumma-Sōja Station and Central Maebashi	Kanetsu Transportation	Kawaramachi, Gunma Sport Complex Center
3	Towards Shikishima park, Gumma-Sōja Station and Central Maebashi	Nippon Chuo Bus	Gumma-Sōja Station, Chūō-Maebashi Station
3	Towards Shikishima park, Gumma-Sōja Station and Central Maebashi	Mai Bus	Shin-Maebashi Station
4	Towards Isesaki, Tamamura, southern and eastern Maebashi	Kanetsu Transportation	Keyaki Walk
4	Towards Isesaki, Tamamura, southern and eastern Maebashi	Nippon Chuo Bus	Ishiseki Town, Jonan Sports Park, Komagata Statio North exit, Keyaki Walk
4	Towards Isesaki, Tamamura, southern and eastern Maebashi	Gunma-bus	Red Cross Hospital
4	Towards Isesaki, Tamamura, southern and eastern Maebashi	Nagai Transport	Tamamura Town Hall, Gokan Town Entrance
5	Towards Takasaki, Yoshioka and western Maebashi	Kanetsu Transportation	Gunma Onsen, Gunma Prefectural Museum of Literature
5	Towards Takasaki, Yoshioka and western Maebashi	Gunma Chuo Bus	Takasaki Station West Exit
5	Towards Takasaki, Yoshioka and western Maebashi	Nippon Chuo Bus	Momoisen, Shintou Onsen
5	Towards Takasaki, Yoshioka and western Maebashi	Gunma-bus	Misato, Aeon Mall Takasaki
5	Towards Takasaki, Yoshioka and western Maebashi	Joshin Kanko Bus	Takasaki Station West Exit
6	Towards Shin-Maebashi Station, Mount Akagi and northern Maebashi	Kanetsu Transportation	Fujimi Onsen, Akagi National Youth Exchange House, Mt. Akagi Visitor Center
6	Towards Shin-Maebashi Station, Mount Akagi and northern Maebashi	Gunma Chuo Bus	Shin-Maebashi West Exit
6	Towards Shin-Maebashi Station, Mount Akagi and northern Maebashi	Nippon Chuo Bus	Fujimi Onsen, Fujimi Community Center
6	Towards Shin-Maebashi Station, Mount Akagi and northern Maebashi	Nagai Transport	Mine Park, Osakako, Ogikubo Park

=== South Exit Bus Rotary (Highway Busses) ===
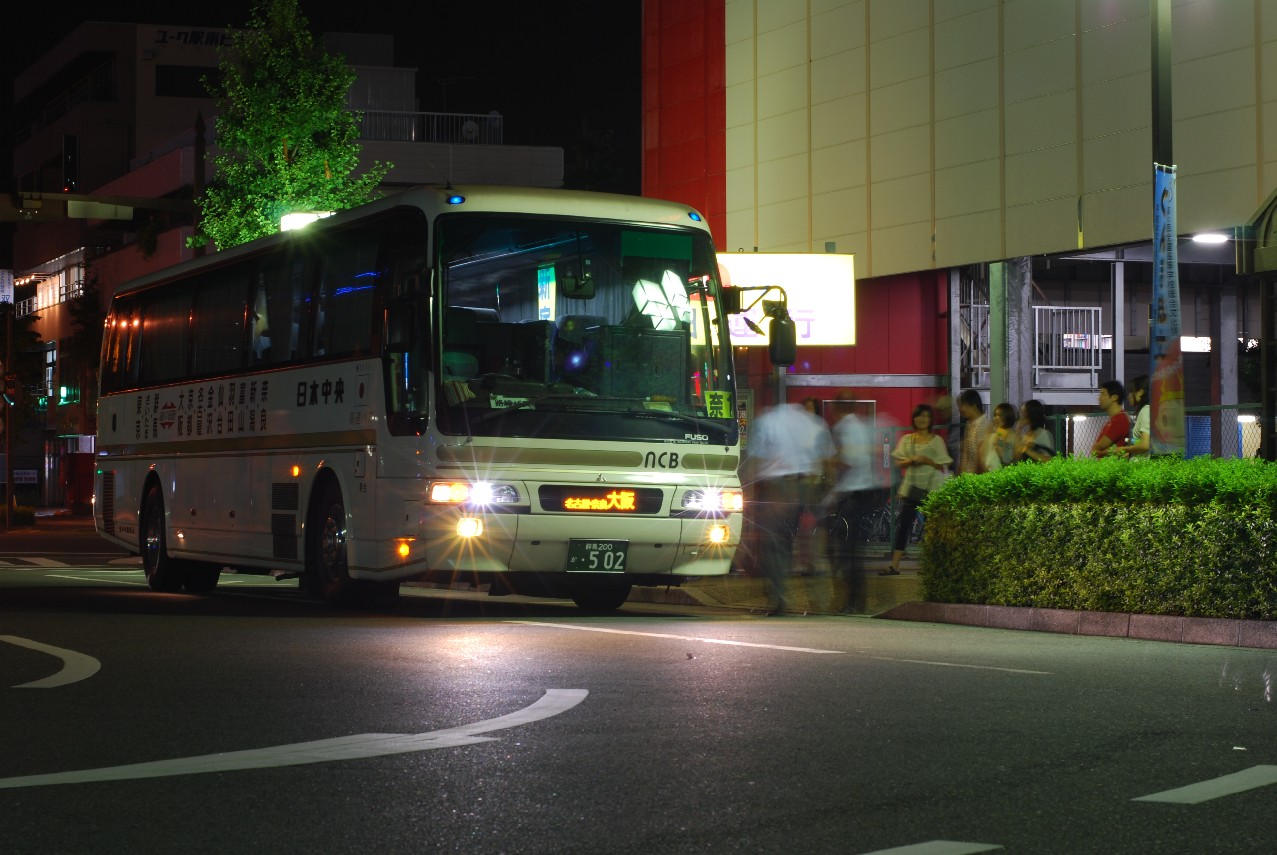
Highway Bus at Maebashi Station

Operating Companies	Destination
Kanetsu Transportation / Chiba Kōtsū	Narita Airport
Airport Transport Service / Nippon Chuo Bus	Haneda Airport
Nippon Chuo Bus	Osaka; Toyama Station/Kanazawa Station; Sendai Station; Shinjuku Station/Akihabara Station/Tokyo Station
Kanetsu Transportation / FUJIKYU BUS	Fuji-Q Highland

== See also ==
- List of railway stations in Japan
