= Sasamori Kofun =

Kofun period burial mound in Gunma, Japan

- 笹森古墳 (Japanese)
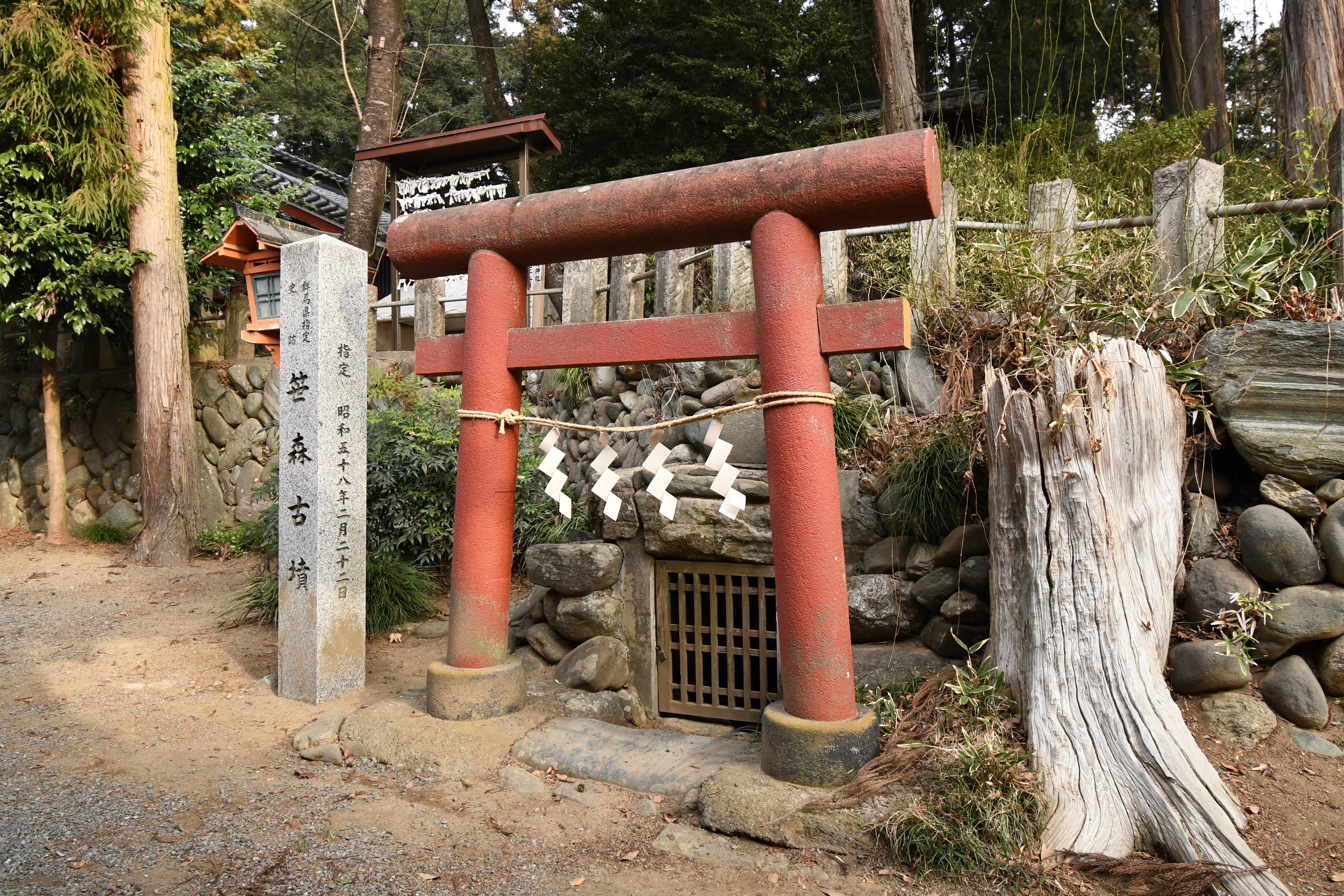
- Sasamori Kofun

- Sasamori Kofun Sasamori Kofun (Japan)
- 36°15′3.9″N 138°55′24.52″E
- Type: Kofun
- Periods: Kofun period
- Location: 1315-1 Fukushima, Mitsugi-cho, Kanra, Gunma
- Region: Kantō region

History
- Built: late 6th century

Site notes
- Public access: Yes (park)
- Gunma Prefecture Historic Site

The Sasamori Kofun (笹森古墳) is a Kofun period burial mound, located in the Fukushima neighborhood of the town of Kanra, Gunma in the Kantō region of Japan. The tumulus was designated a Gunma Prefecture Historic Site in 1983. It is also refrred to as the Sasamori Inari Kofun, after a Shinto shrine, the Sasamori Inari Jinja, which is located on the constricted part of the burial mound.

== Overview ==
The Sasamori Kofun is ais a zenpō-kōen-fun (前方後円墳), which is shaped like a keyhole, having one square end and one circular end, when viewed from above. It is constructed on the upper terrace edge of a fluvial terrace on the south bank of the Kaburagawa River in southern Gunma Prefecture. No archaeological excavations have been conducted.

The mound has a well-developed anterior section, orientated to the west. The mound is constructed in two tiers and has a total length of approximately 101 meters, making it one of the largest in the Kaburagawa River basin. Fukiishi revetment stones and haniwa clay figures are visible on the surface. The burial mound is surrounded by a shield-shaped moat.

The burial chamber is a double-chambered horizontal-entry stone chamber located in the posterior circular section, opening to the south. Measuring approximately 16 meters in length, it is the second largest in Gunma Prefecture. The chamber proper is seven by 2.3 meters with a height of 2.7 meters, and the entry passageway is nine meters long by 1.3 meters wide and 1.7 meters high. The material of the burial chamber is natural tuff boulders. While the grave goods inside the chamber are not fully known, the Sasamori Inari Shrine has preserved a five-bell bronze mirror (a mirror with five bells around its circumference), said to have come from the burial chamber. Currently, access to the interior of the burial chamber is restricted, and it is only open to the public during the annual Sasamori Inari Shrine festival on the second Sunday of March.

The construction period is estimated to be the late 6th century, during the late Kofun period.The identity of the person buried there is unknown, but according to local legend, it is the tomb of Prince Hikosashima. Per the Nihon Shoki, this prince was the great-grandson of Emperor Sujin. During the 55th year of the reign of Emperor Keikō, he was appointed appointed governor of the fifteen provinces of the Tōsandō region, but died en route to his territory. The people of eastern provinces mourned his death and stole his remains, burying them in Kōzuke. The Kojiki lists him as the kuni no miyatsuko of Kamitsukeno and the Nihon Shoki further states that his descendants continued to reside in Kōzuke.

The tumulus is approximately one kilometers southwest of Jōshin Dentetsu Jōshū-Fukushima Station.

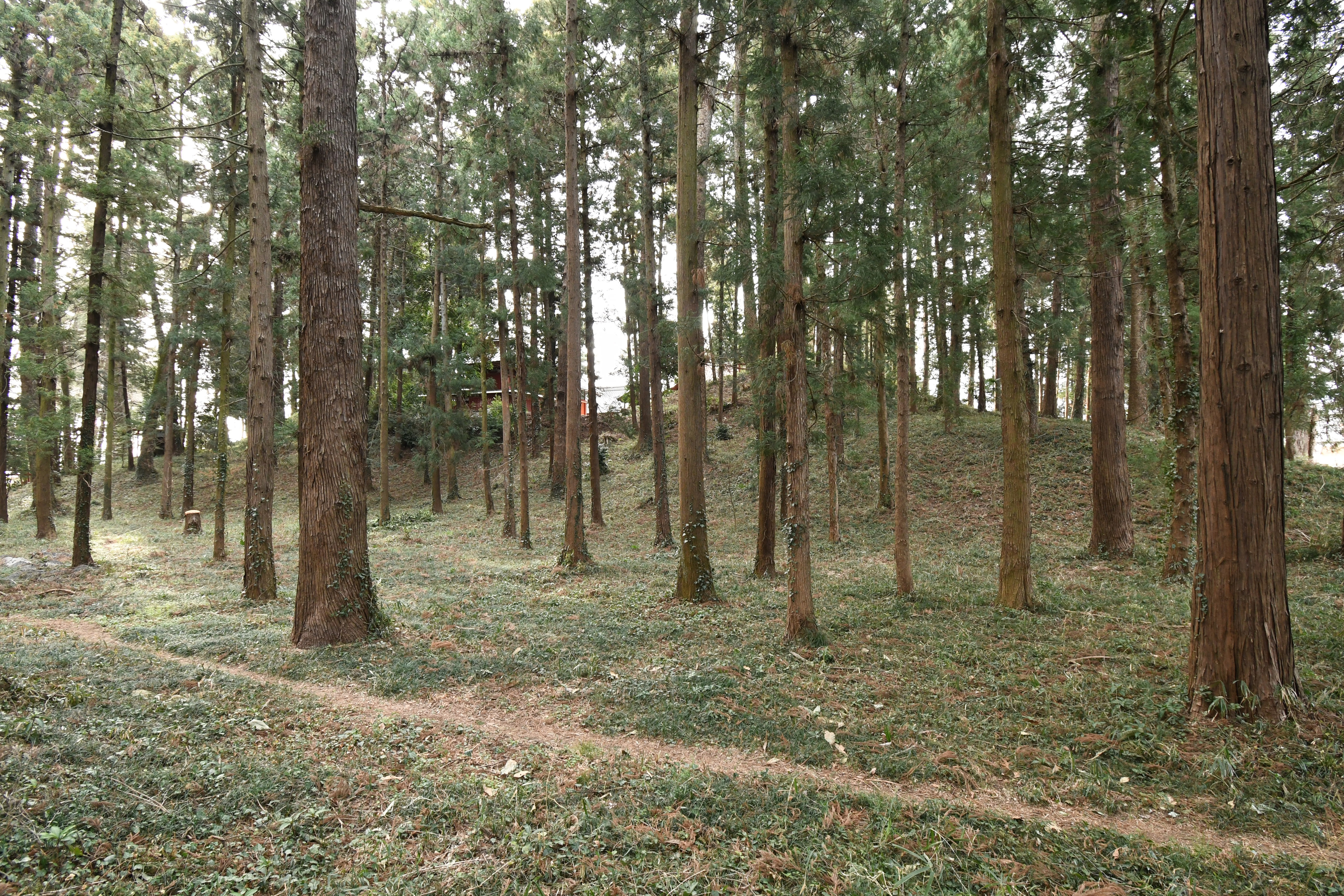
Front section on the right, rear circular section on the far left

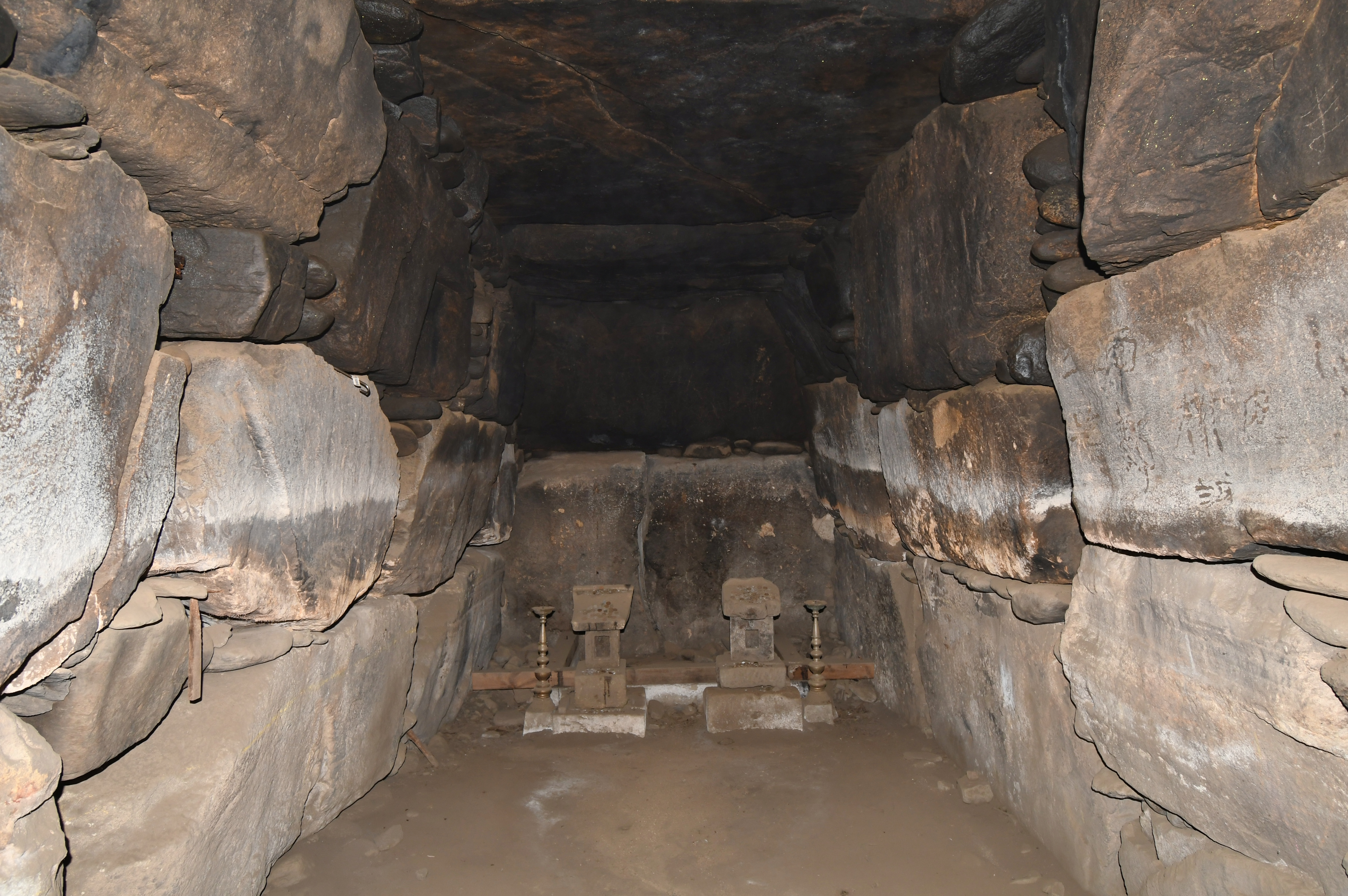
Burial chamber (towards the back wall)

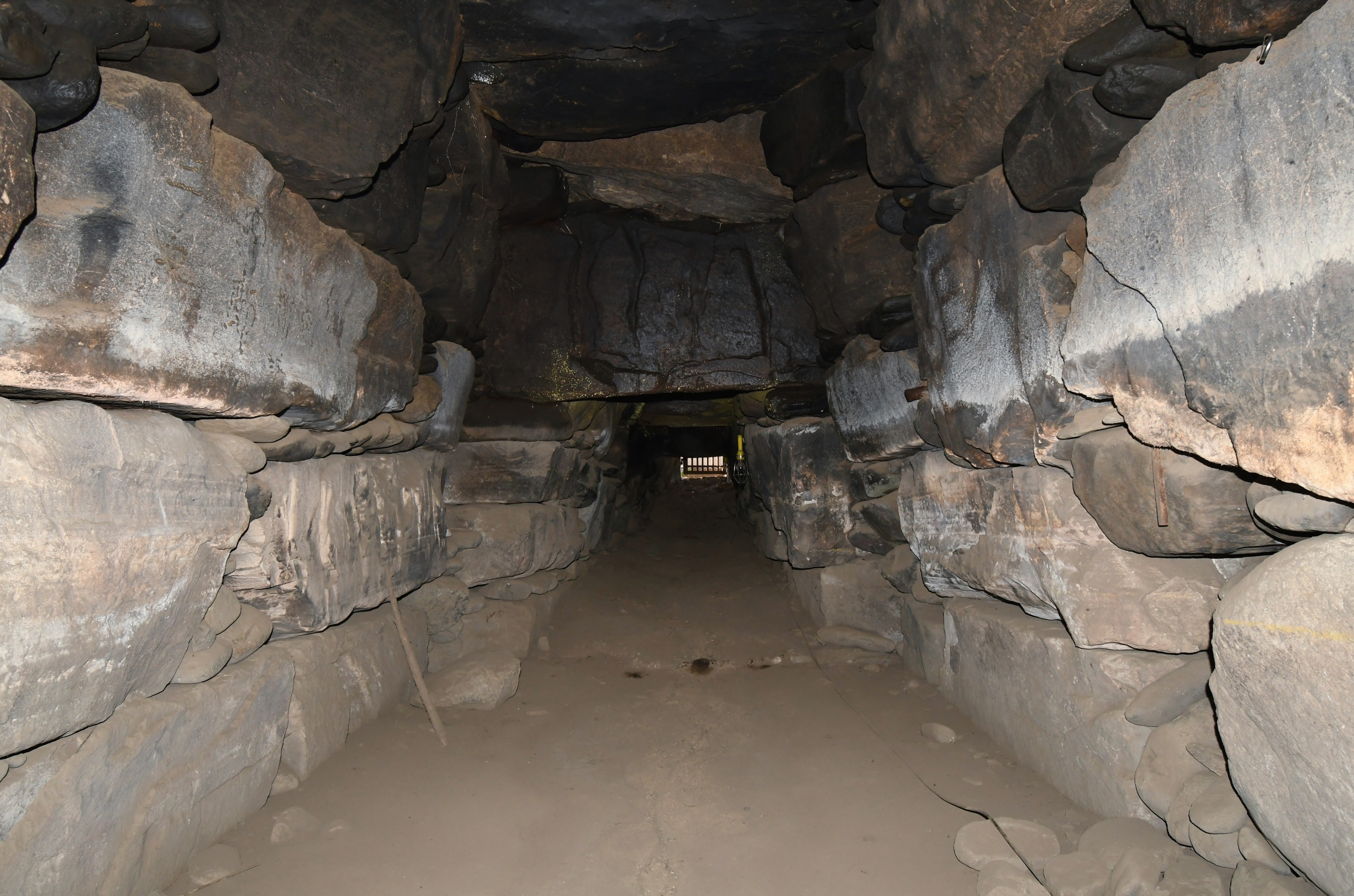
Burial chamber (towards the opening)

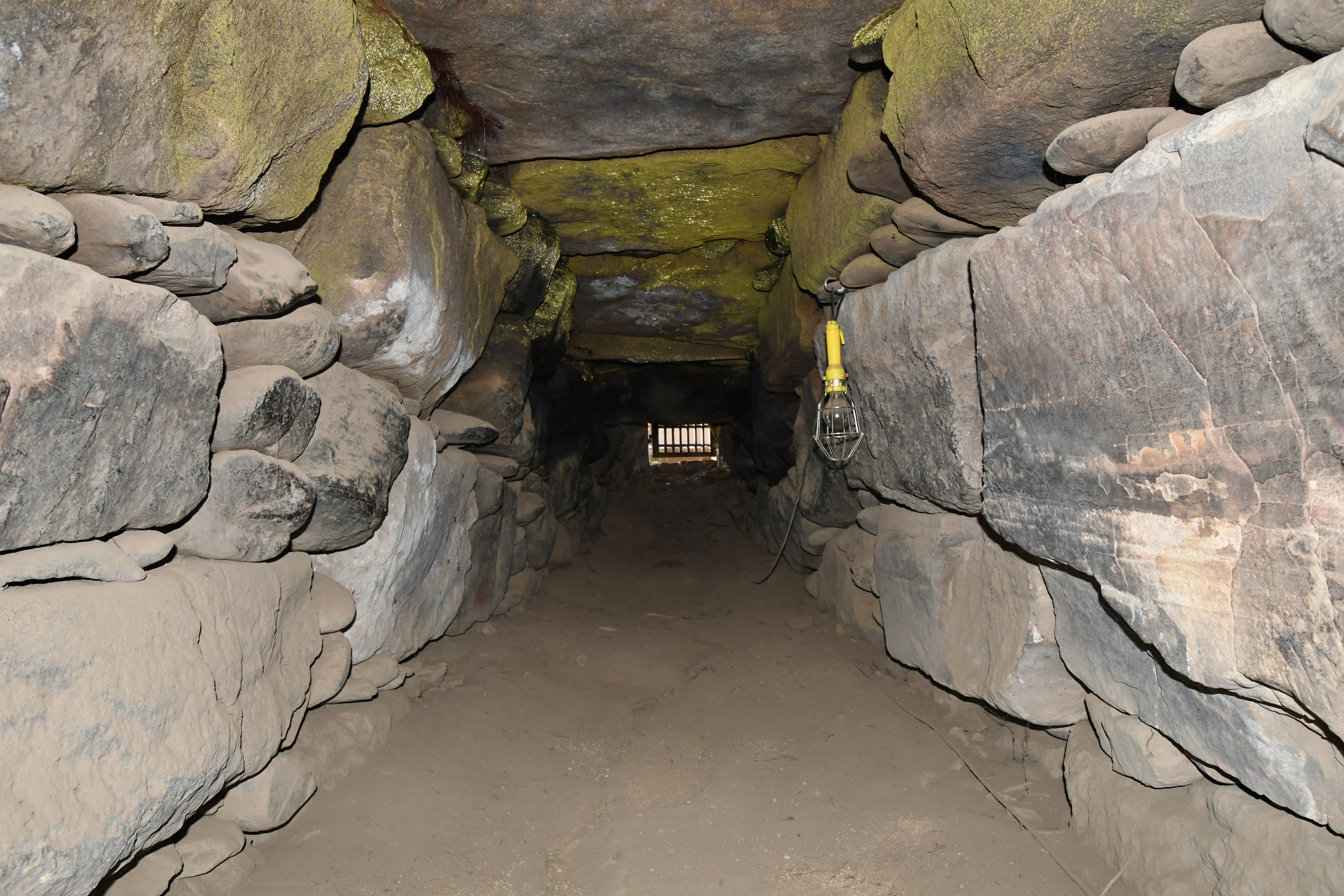
Entrance passage (towards the opening)

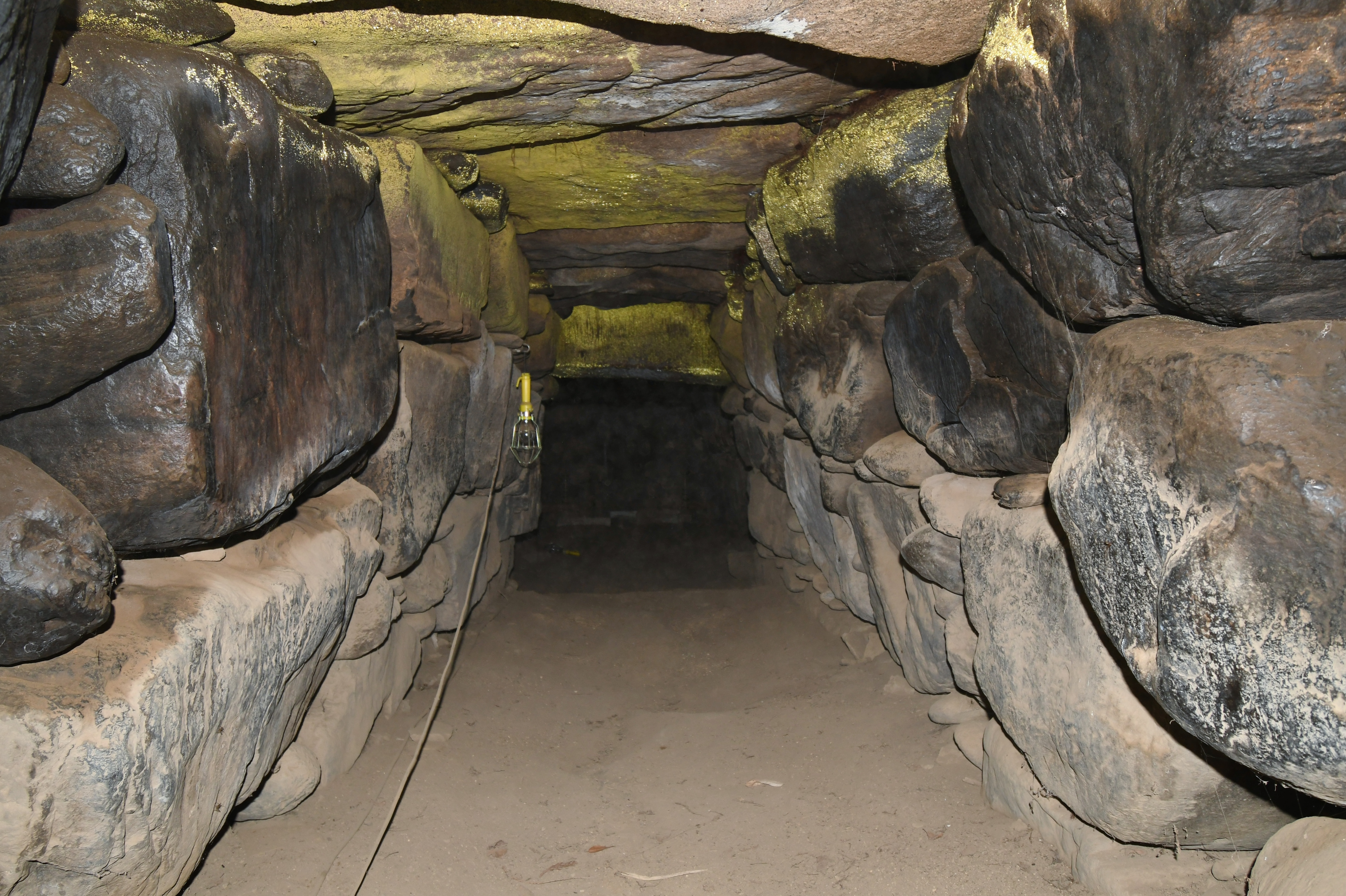
Entrance passage (towards the burial chamber)

Total length
101 meters
Anterior rectangular portion
61 meters wide, 10 meters high, two tiers
Posterior circular portion
60 meter diameter, 10 meters high, two tiers

== See also ==
- List of Historic Sites of Japan (Gunma)
