= Nanjai Station =

Railway station in Tomioka, Gunma Prefecture, Japan

Nanjai Station 南蛇井駅
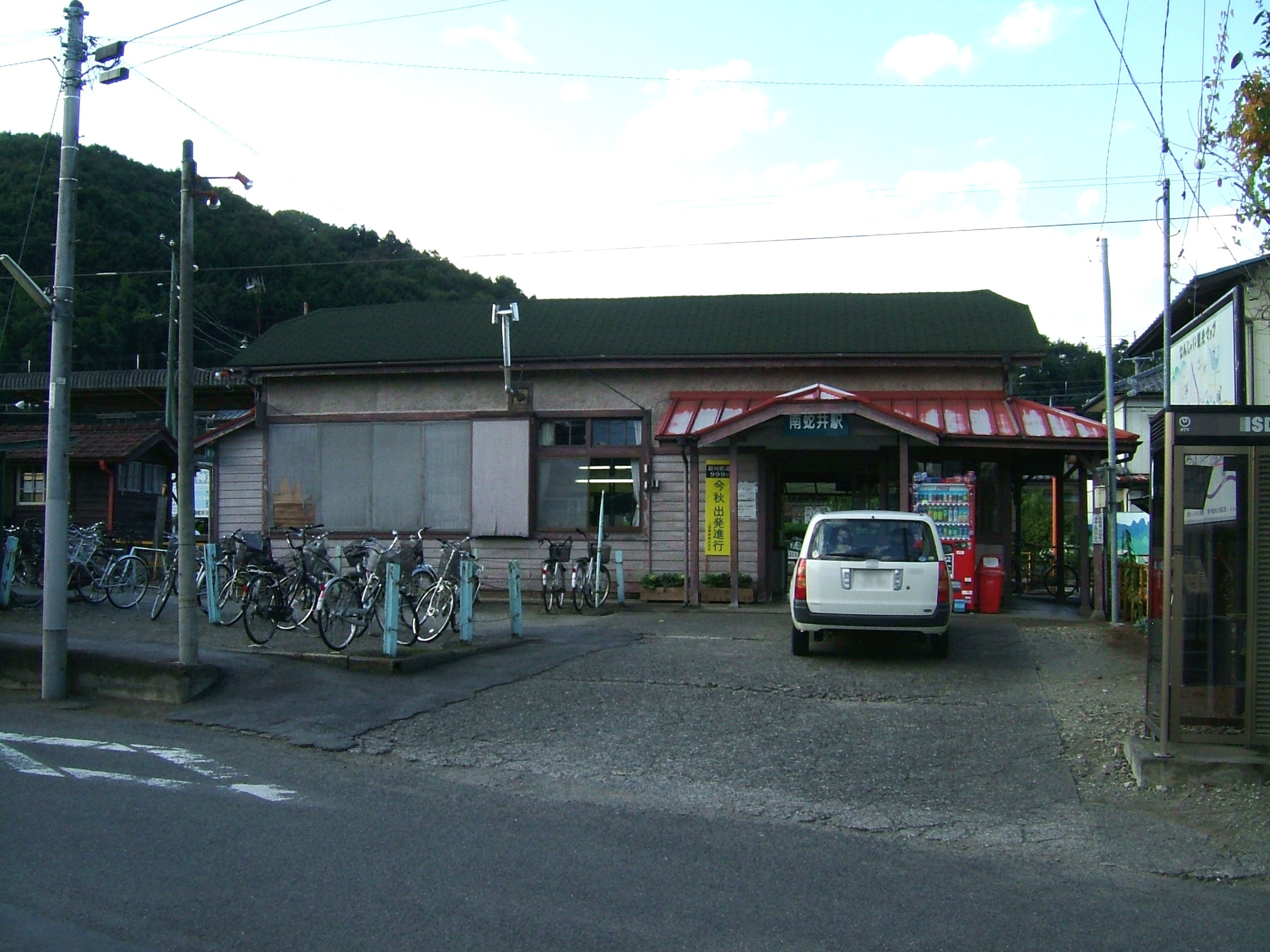
- Nanjai Station, October 2006

General information
- Location: Nanjai 496-2, Tomioka-shi, Gunma-ken 370-2464; Japan
- Coordinates: 36.238239°N 138.8141°E
- Operator: Jōshin Dentetsu
- Line: ■ Jōshin Line
- Distance: 28.2 km from Takasaki
- Platforms: 1 island platform

Other information
- Status: Unstaffed
- Website: Official website

History
- Opened: 2 July 1897

Passengers
- FY2019: 87

Services
Preceding station	Joshin Electric Railway	Following station
Sendaira towards Shimonita	Jōshin Line	Kanohara towards Takasaki
Location
- Location within Gunma Prefecture Location within Japan

Nanjai Station (南蛇井駅, Nanjai-eki) is a passenger railway station in the city of Tomioka, Gunma, Japan, operated by the private railway operator Jōshin Dentetsu.

== Lines ==
Nanjai Station is a station on the Jōshin Line, and is 28.2 kilometers from the terminus of the line at Takasaki.

== Station layout ==
The station consists of a single island platform connected to the station building by a level crossing.

=== Platforms ===
1	■ Jōshin Line	for Shimonita
2	■ Jōshin Line	for Takasaki

== History ==
Nanjai Station opened on 2 July 1897.

== Surrounding area ==
- Nanjai Post Office

== See also ==
- List of railway stations in Japan
