= Nishi-Yoshii Station =

Railway station in Takasaki, Gunma Prefecture, Japan

Nishi-Yoshii Station 西吉井駅
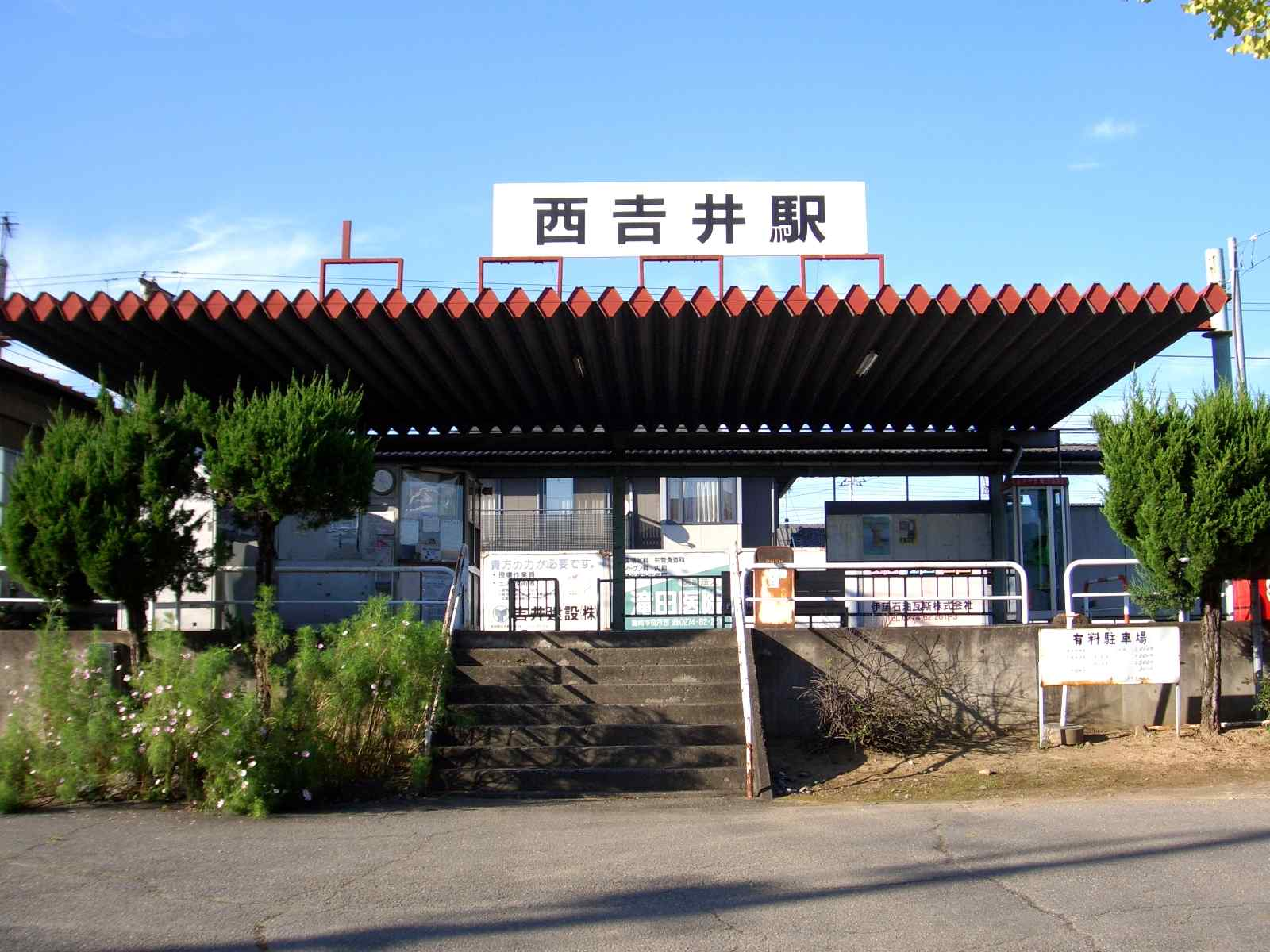
- Nishi-Yoshii Station, October 2006

General information
- Location: Yoshii-machi Nagane 1367-34, Takasaki-shi, Gunma-ken 370-2127; Japan
- Coordinates: 36°15′20.62″N 138°57′58.01″E
- Operator: Jōshin Dentetsu
- Line: ■ Jōshin Line
- Distance: 13.4 km from Takasaki
- Platforms: 1 side platform

Other information
- Status: Unstaffed
- Website: Official website

History
- Opened: 15 December 1971

Passengers
- FY2018: 139

Services
Preceding station	Joshin Electric Railway	Following station
Jōshū-Niiya towards Shimonita	Jōshin Line	Yoshii towards Takasaki
Location
- Location within Gunma Prefecture Location within Japan

Nishi-Yoshii Station (西吉井駅, Nishi-Yoshii-eki) is a passenger railway station in the city of Takasaki, Gunma, Japan.It is operated by the private railway operator Jōshin Dentetsu.

== Lines ==
Nishi-Yoshii Station is a station on the Jōshin Line and is 13.4 km from the terminus of the line at Takasaki.

== Station layout ==
The station consists of a single side platform serving traffic in both directions. It is unattended.

== History ==
Nishi-Yoshii Station opened on 15 December 1971.

== Surrounding area ==
- National Route 254
- Yoshii-Nagane Post Office

== See also ==
- List of railway stations in Japan
