= Kanohara Station =

Railway station in Tomioka, Gunma Prefecture, Japan

Kanohara Station 神農原駅
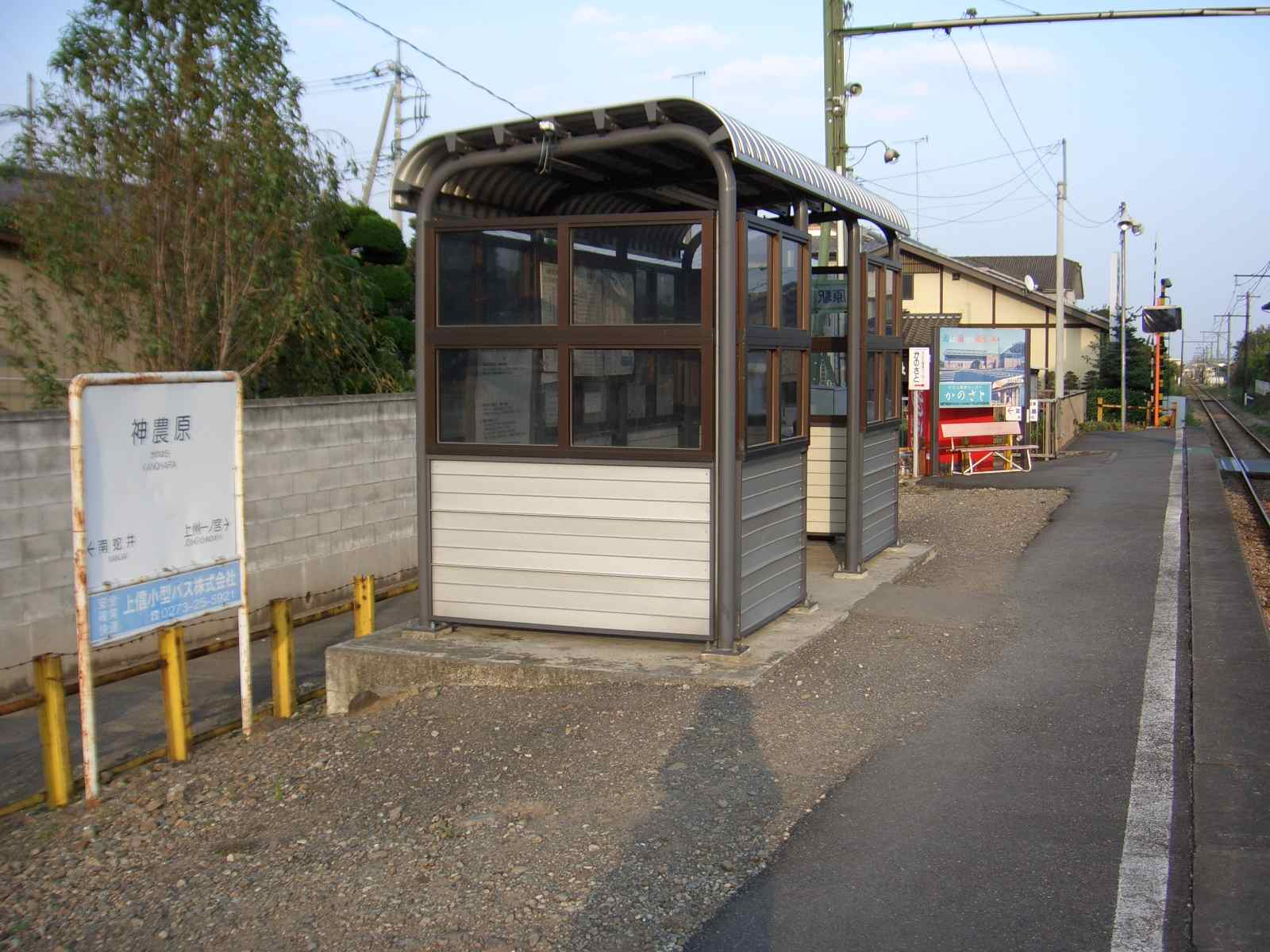
- Kanohara Station, October 2006

General information
- Location: Kanohara 647-2, Tomioka-shi, Gunma-ken 370-2455; Japan
- Coordinates: 36°14′33.84″N 138°50′38.02″E
- Operator: Jōshin Dentetsu
- Line: ■ Jōshin Line
- Distance: 28.2 km from Takasaki
- Platforms: 1 side platform

Other information
- Status: Unstaffed
- Website: Official website

History
- Opened: 2 July 1897

Passengers
- FY2019: 82

Services
Preceding station	Joshin Electric Railway	Following station
Nanjai towards Shimonita	Jōshin Line	Jōshū-Ichinomiya towards Takasaki
Location
- Location within Gunma Prefecture Location within Japan

Kanohara Station (神農原駅, Kanohara-eki) is a passenger railway station in the city of Tomioka, Gunma, Japan, operated by the private railway operator Jōshin Dentetsu.

== Lines ==
Nanjai Station is a station on the Jōshin Line and is 28.2 kilometers from the terminus of the line at Takasaki.

== Station layout ==
The station consists of a single side platform serving traffic in both directions. There is no station building, but only a shelter on the platform. The station is unattended.

== History ==
Kanohara Station opened on 2 July 1897.

== Surrounding area ==
- National Route 254

== See also ==
- List of railway stations in Japan
