= Jōshū-Niiya Station =

Railway station in Kanra, Gunma Prefecture, Japan

Jōshū-Niiya Station 上州新屋駅
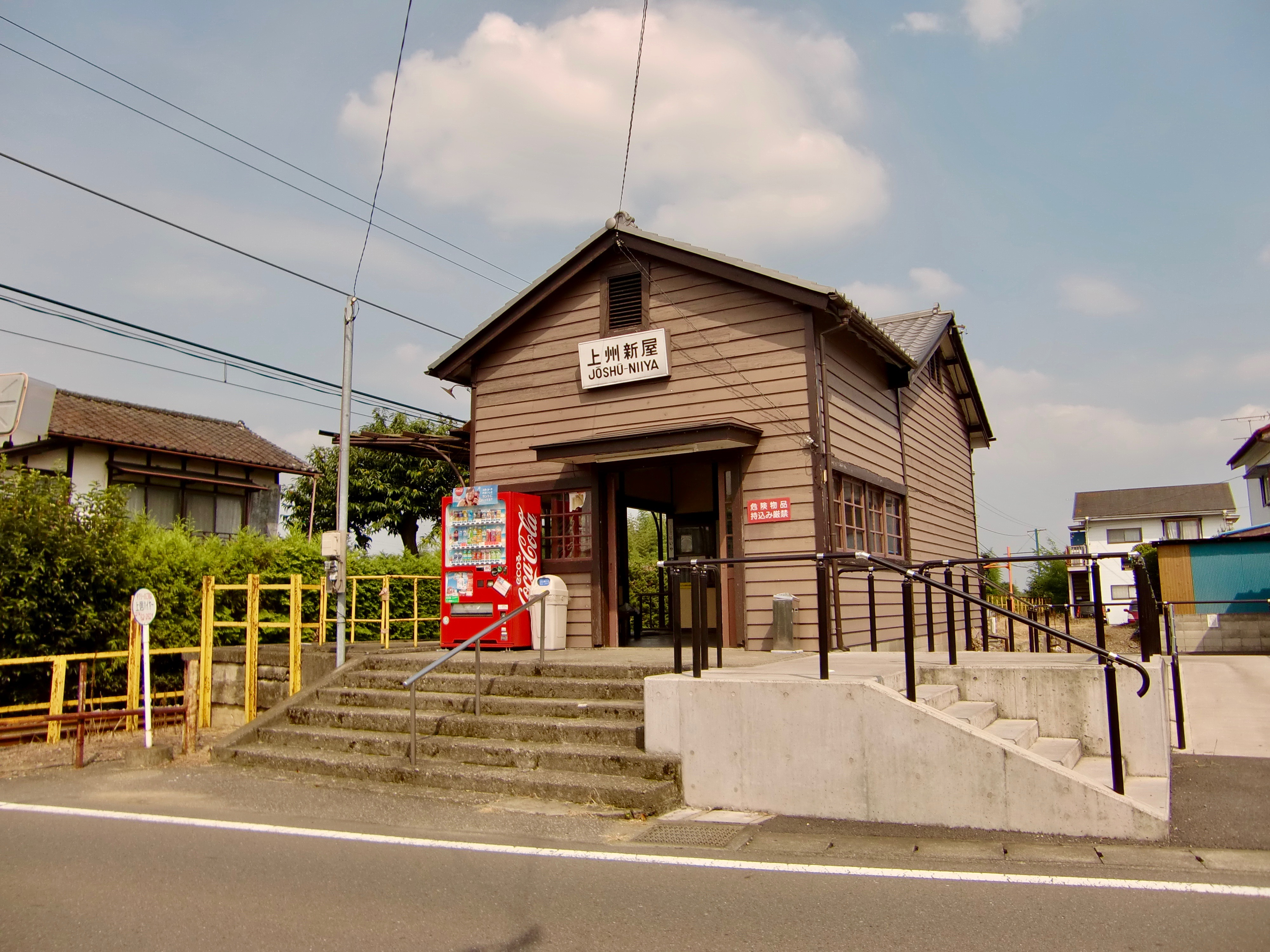
- Jōshū-Niiya Station in August 2013

General information
- Location: Kanei 343-4, Kanra-machi, Kanra-gun, Gunma-ken 370-2216; Japan
- Coordinates: 36°15′21.44″N 138°57′5.63″E
- Operator: Jōshin Dentetsu
- Line: ■ Jōshin Line
- Distance: 14.9 km from Takasaki
- Platforms: 1 side platform

Other information
- Status: Unstaffed
- Website: Official website

History
- Opened: 31 July 1915
- Former names: Niiya (until 1921)

Passengers
- FY2018: 136

Services
Preceding station	Joshin Electric Railway	Following station
Jōshū-Fukushima towards Shimonita	Jōshin Line	Nishi-Yoshii towards Takasaki
Location
- Location within Gunma Prefecture Location within Japan

Jōshū-Niiya Station (上州新屋駅, Jōshū-Niiya-eki) is a passenger railway station in the town of Kanra, Gunma, Japan, operated by the private railway operator Jōshin Dentetsu.

== Lines ==
Jōshū-Niiya Station is a station on the Jōshin Line and is 14.9 kilometers from the terminus of the line at Takasaki.

== Station layout ==
The station consists of a single side platform serving traffic in both directions. It is unattended.

== History ==
Jōshū-Niiya Station opened on 31 July 1915 as Niiya Station (新屋駅, Niiya-eki). It was renamed to its present name on 17 December 1921.

== Surrounding area ==
- Niiya Post Office

== See also ==
- List of railway stations in Japan
