= Sanonowatashi Station =

Railway station in Takasaki, Gunma Prefecture, Japan

Sanonowatashi Station 佐野のわたし駅
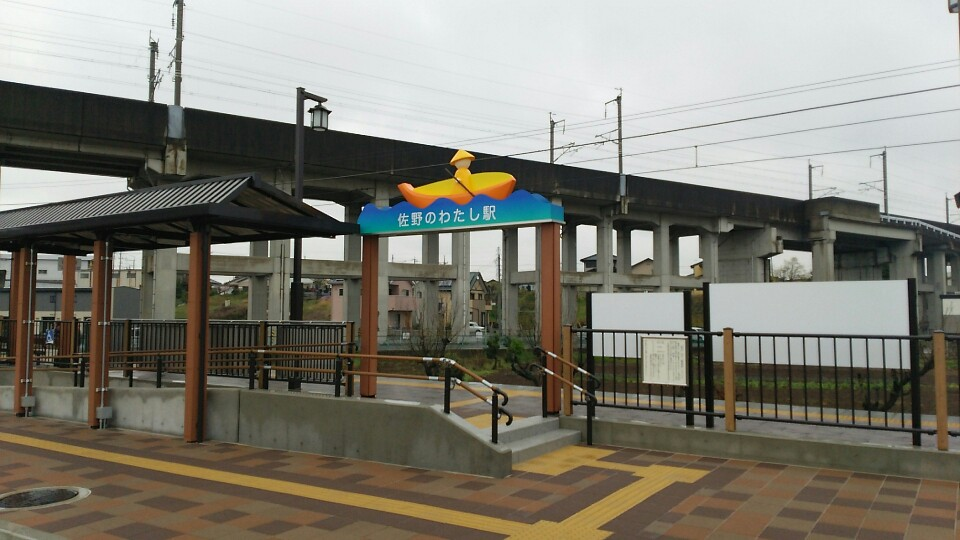
- Sanonowatashi Station, April 2015

General information
- Location: Kamisano-machi Funabashi 1670-3, Takasaki-shi, Gunma-ken 370-0857; Japan
- Coordinates: 36°18′8.6″N 139°1′5.3″E
- Operator: Jōshin Dentetsu
- Line: ■ Jōshin Line
- Distance: 2.2 km from Takasaki
- Platforms: 1 side platform

Other information
- Status: Unstaffed
- Website: Official website

History
- Opened: 22 December 2014

Passengers
- FY2018: 125

Services
Preceding station	Joshin Electric Railway	Following station
Negoya towards Shimonita	Jōshin Line	Minami-Takasaki towards Takasaki
Location
- Location within Gunma Prefecture Location within Japan

Sanonowatashi Station (佐野のわたし駅, Sanonowatashi-eki) is a passenger railway station in the city of Takasaki, Gunma, Japan, operated by the private railway operator Jōshin Dentetsu.

== Lines ==
Sanonowatashi Station is a station on the Jōshin Line and is 2.2 kilometres (1.4 miles) from the terminus of the line at Takasaki.

== Station layout ==
The station consists of a single side platform serving traffic in both directions. There is no station building.

== History ==
Sanonowatashi Station opened on 22 December 2014.

== Surrounding area ==
- Karasugawa River

== See also ==
- List of railway stations in Japan
