= Yoshii Station =

Yoshii Station (吉井駅) is the name of two train stations in Japan:

- Yoshii Station (Gunma)
- Yoshii Station (Nagasaki)
