= Minami-Takasaki Station =

Railway station in Takasaki, Gunma Prefecture, Japan

Minami-Takasaki Station 南高崎駅
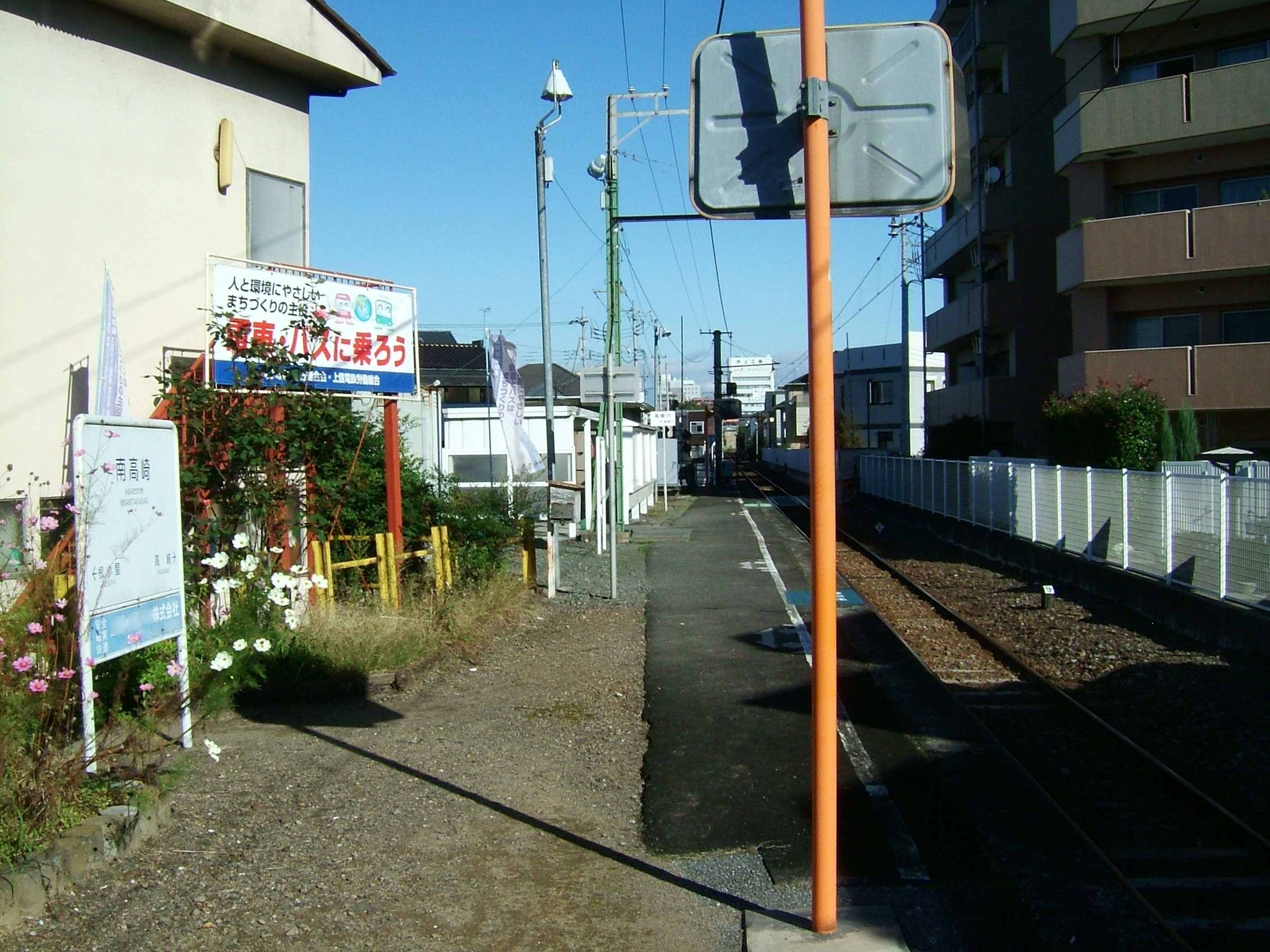
- Minami-Takasaki Station, October 2008

General information
- Location: Shimowada-machi 3-chome, Takasaki-shi, Gunma-ken 370-0846; Japan
- Coordinates: 36°18′44.67″N 139°0′44.29″E
- Operator: Jōshin Dentetsu
- Line: ■ Jōshin Line
- Distance: 0.9 km from Takasaki
- Platforms: 1 side platform

Other information
- Status: Unstaffed
- Website: Official website

History
- Opened: 9 September 1935
- Former names: Shimowada (until 1953)

Passengers
- FY2019: 63

Services
Preceding station	Joshin Electric Railway	Following station
Sanonowatashi towards Shimonita	Jōshin Line	Takasaki Terminus
Location
- Location within Gunma Prefecture Location within Japan

Minami-Takasaki Station (南高崎駅, Minami-Takasaki-eki) is a passenger railway station in the city of Takasaki, Gunma, Japan, operated by the private railway operator Jōshin Dentetsu.

== Lines ==
Minami-Takasaki Station is a station on the Jōshin Line and is 0.9 kilometers from the terminus of the line at Takasaki.

== Station layout ==
The station consists of a single side platform serving traffic in both directions. There is no station building.

== History ==
Minami-Takasaki Station opened on 9 September 1935 as Shimowada Station (下和田). It was renamed to its present name on 15 January 1953.

== Surrounding area ==
- National Route 254

== See also ==
- List of railway stations in Japan
