= Negoya Station =

Railway station in Takasaki, Gunma Prefecture, Japan

Negoya Station 根小屋駅
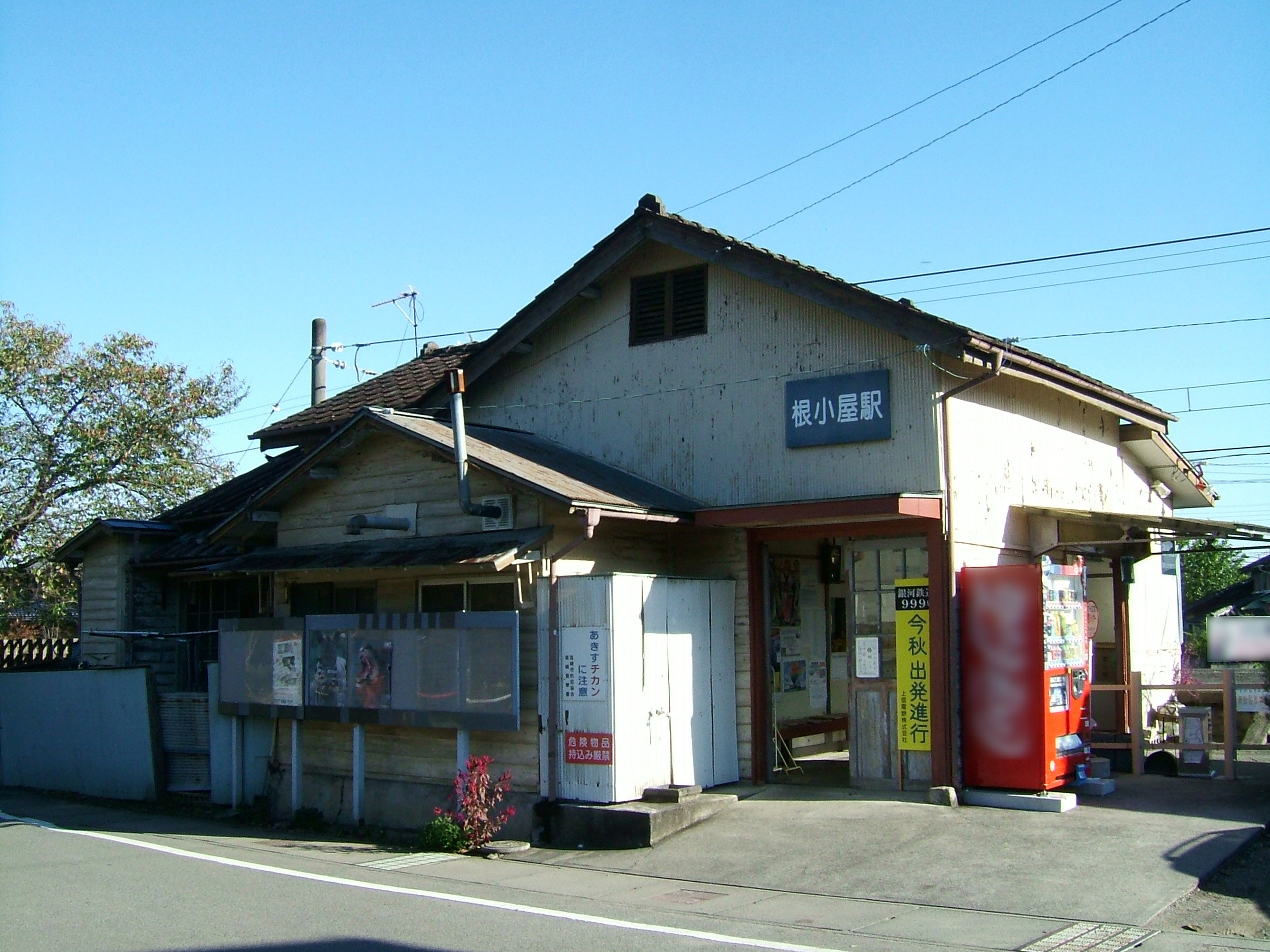
- Negoya Station, October 2008

General information
- Location: Negoya-machi, Takasaki-shi, Gunma-ken 370-1214; Japan
- Coordinates: 36°17′29.14″N 139°1′7.54″E
- Operator: Jōshin Dentetsu
- Line: ■ Jōshin Line
- Distance: 3.7 km from Takasaki
- Platforms: 1 side platform

Other information
- Status: Unstaffed
- Website: Official website

History
- Opened: 1 June 1926

Passengers
- FY2018: 156

Services
Preceding station	Joshin Electric Railway	Following station
Takasaki-Shōka-Daigakumae towards Shimonita	Jōshin Line	Sanonowatashi towards Takasaki
Location
- Location within Gunma Prefecture Location within Japan

Negoya Station (根小屋駅, Negoya-eki) is a passenger railway station in the city of Takasaki, Gunma, Japan, operated by the private railway operator Jōshin Dentetsu.

== Lines ==
Negoya Station is a station on the Jōshin Line and is 3.7 kilometers from the terminus of the line at Takasaki.

== Station layout ==
The station has a single side platform serving traffic in both directions.

== History ==
Negoya Station opened on 1 June 1926.

== Surrounding area ==
- site of Negoya Castle

== See also ==
- List of railway stations in Japan
