= Higashi-Tomioka Station =

Railway station in Tomioka, Gunma Prefecture, Japan

Higashi-Tomioka Station 東富岡駅
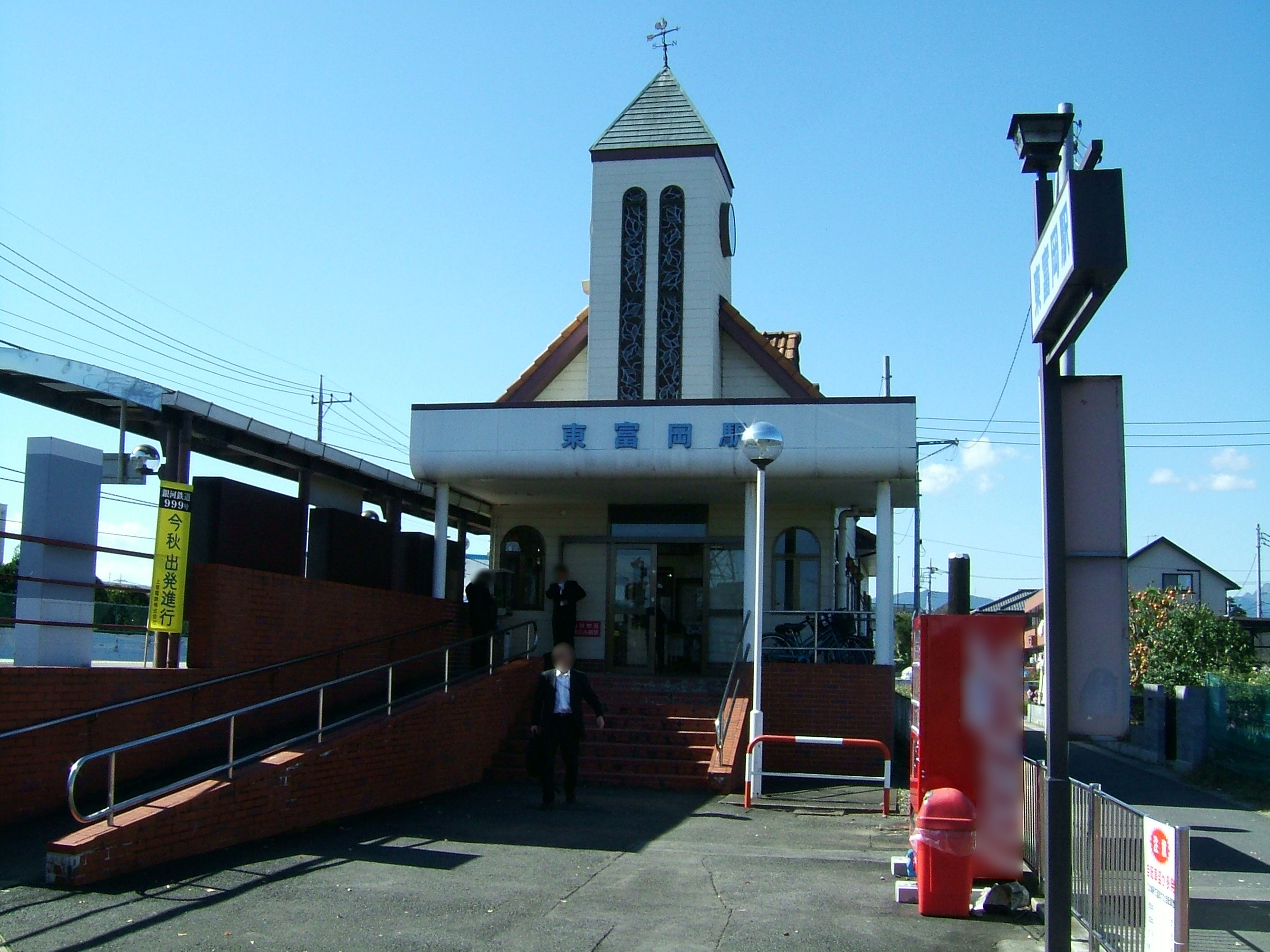
- Higashi-Tomioka Station, October 2008

General information
- Location: Tomioka 1955, Tomioka-shi, Gunma-ken 370-2316; Japan
- Coordinates: 36°15′39.07″N 138°54′6.67″E
- Operator: Jōshin Dentetsu
- Line: ■ Jōshin Line
- Distance: 19.3 km from Takasaki
- Platforms: 1 side platform

Other information
- Status: Unstaffed
- Website: Official website

History
- Opened: 1 April 1990

Passengers
- FY2019: 212

Services
Preceding station	Joshin Electric Railway	Following station
Jōshū-Tomioka towards Shimonita	Jōshin Line	Jōshū-Fukushima towards Takasaki
Location
- Location within Gunma Prefecture Location within Japan

Higashi-Tomioka Station (東富岡駅, Higashi-Tomioka-eki) is a passenger railway station in the city of Tomioka, Gunma, Japan, operated by the private railway operator Jōshin Dentetsu.

== Lines ==
Higashi-Tomioka Station is a station on the Jōshin Line and is 19.3 kilometers from the terminus of the line at Takasaki.

== Station layout ==
The station consists of a single side platform serving traffic in both directions.

== History ==
Higashi-Tomioka Station opened on 1 April 1990.

== Surrounding area ==
- National Route 254
- Tomioka General Hospital

== See also ==
- List of railway stations in Japan
