= Nishi-Yamana Station =

Railway station in Takasaki, Gunma Prefecture, Japan

Nishi-Yamana Station 西山名駅
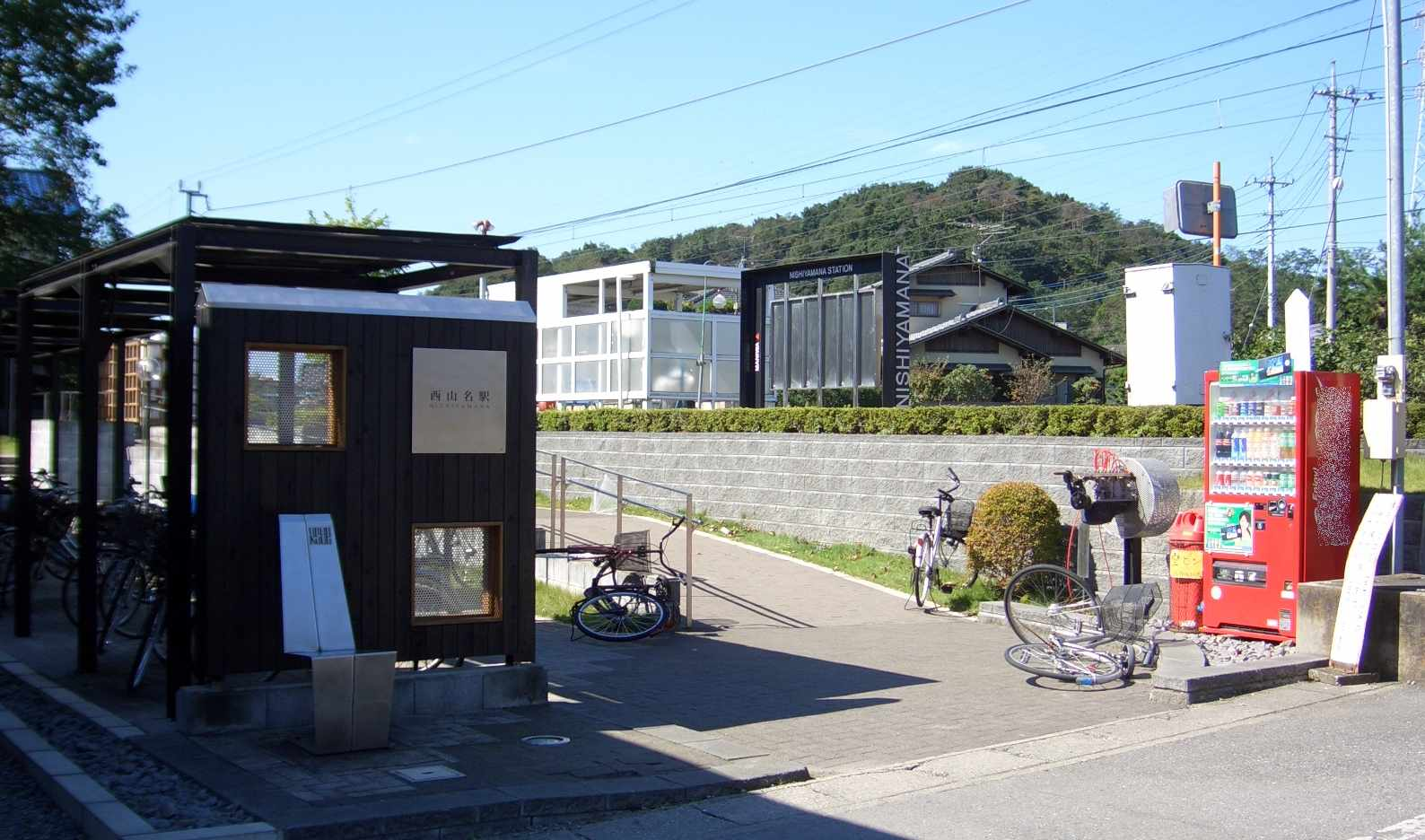
- Nishi-Yamana Station, October 2006

General information
- Location: Yamana-machi 1261-2, Takasaki-shi, Gunma-ken 370-1213; Japan
- Coordinates: 36°16′15.58″N 139°01′56.27″E
- Operator: Jōshin Dentetsu
- Line: ■ Jōshin Line
- Distance: 7.0 km from Takasaki
- Platforms: 1 side platform

Other information
- Status: Unstaffed
- Website: Official website

History
- Opened: 5 May 1897
- Former names: Suieijōmae (to 1938); Irino (until 1986)

Passengers
- FY2018: 165

Services
Preceding station	Joshin Electric Railway	Following station
Maniwa towards Shimonita	Jōshin Line	Yamana towards Takasaki
Location
- Location within Gunma Prefecture Location within Japan

Nishi-Yamana Station (西山名駅, Nishi-Yamana-eki) is a passenger railway station in the city of Takasaki, Gunma, Japan, operated by the private railway operator Jōshin Dentetsu.

== Lines ==
Nishi-Yamana Station is a station on the Jōshin Line and is 7.0 kilometres from the terminus of the line at Takasaki.

== Station layout ==
The station consists of a single side platform serving traffic in both directions. The station is unattended.

== History ==
Nishi-Yamana Station opened on 15 June 1930 as Suieijōmae Station (水泳場前駅). It was renamed to Irino (入野駅) on 27 December 1938, and to its present name on 20 December 1986.

== Surrounding area ==
- Takasaki Industrial training school

== See also ==
- List of railway stations in Japan
