= Maniwa Station =

Railway station in Takasaki, Gunma Prefecture, Japan

Maniwa Station 馬庭駅
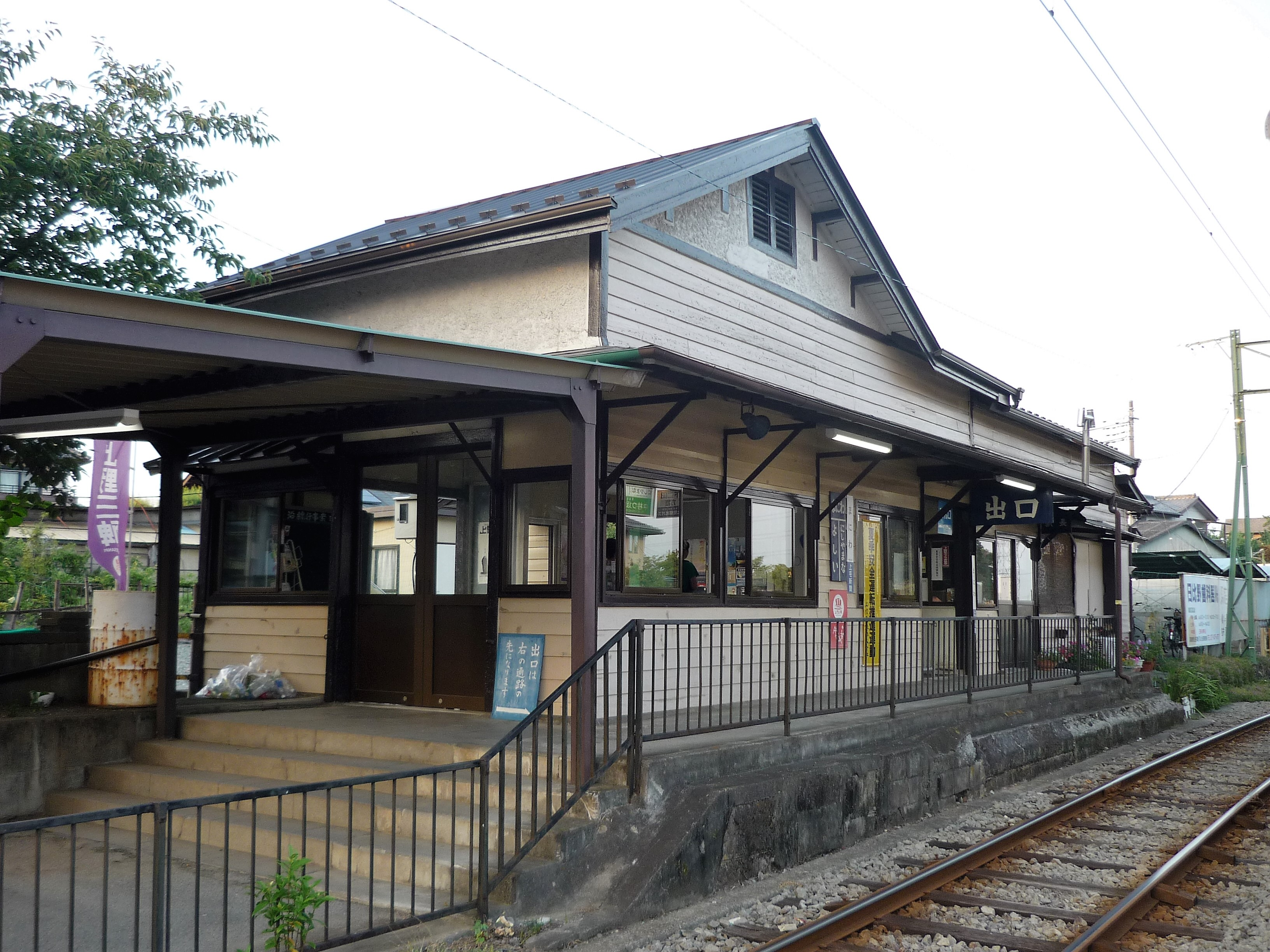
- Maniwa Station in August 2018

General information
- Location: Yoshii-machi Maniwa 191-1, Takasaki-shi, Gunma-ken 370-2104; Japan
- Coordinates: 36°15′43.37″N 139°0′32.9″E
- Operator: Jōshin Dentetsu
- Line: ■ Jōshin Line
- Distance: 9.4 km from Takasaki
- Platforms: 1 island platform

Other information
- Status: Unstaffed
- Website: Official website

History
- Opened: 5 May 1897

Passengers
- FY2018: 395

Services
Preceding station	Joshin Electric Railway	Following station
Yoshii towards Shimonita	Jōshin Line	Nishi-Yamana towards Takasaki
Location
- Location within Gunma Prefecture Location within Japan

Maniwa Station (馬庭駅, Maniwa-eki) is a passenger railway station in the city of Takasaki, Gunma, Japan, operated by the private railway operator Jōshin Dentetsu.

== Lines ==
Maniwa Station is a station on the Jōshin Line and is 9.4 kilometers from the terminus of the line at Takasaki.

== Station layout ==
The station consists of a single island platform connected to the station building by a level crossing.

=== Platforms ===
1	■ Jōshin Line	for Shimonita
2	■ Jōshin Line	for Takasaki

== History ==
Maniwa Station opened on 5 May 1897.

== Surrounding area ==
- Yoshii Maniwa Post Office
- Maniwa Nen-ryū training center

== See also ==
- List of railway stations in Japan
