= Yoshii Station (Gunma) =

Railway station in Takasaki, Gunma Prefecture, Japan

Yoshii Station 吉井駅
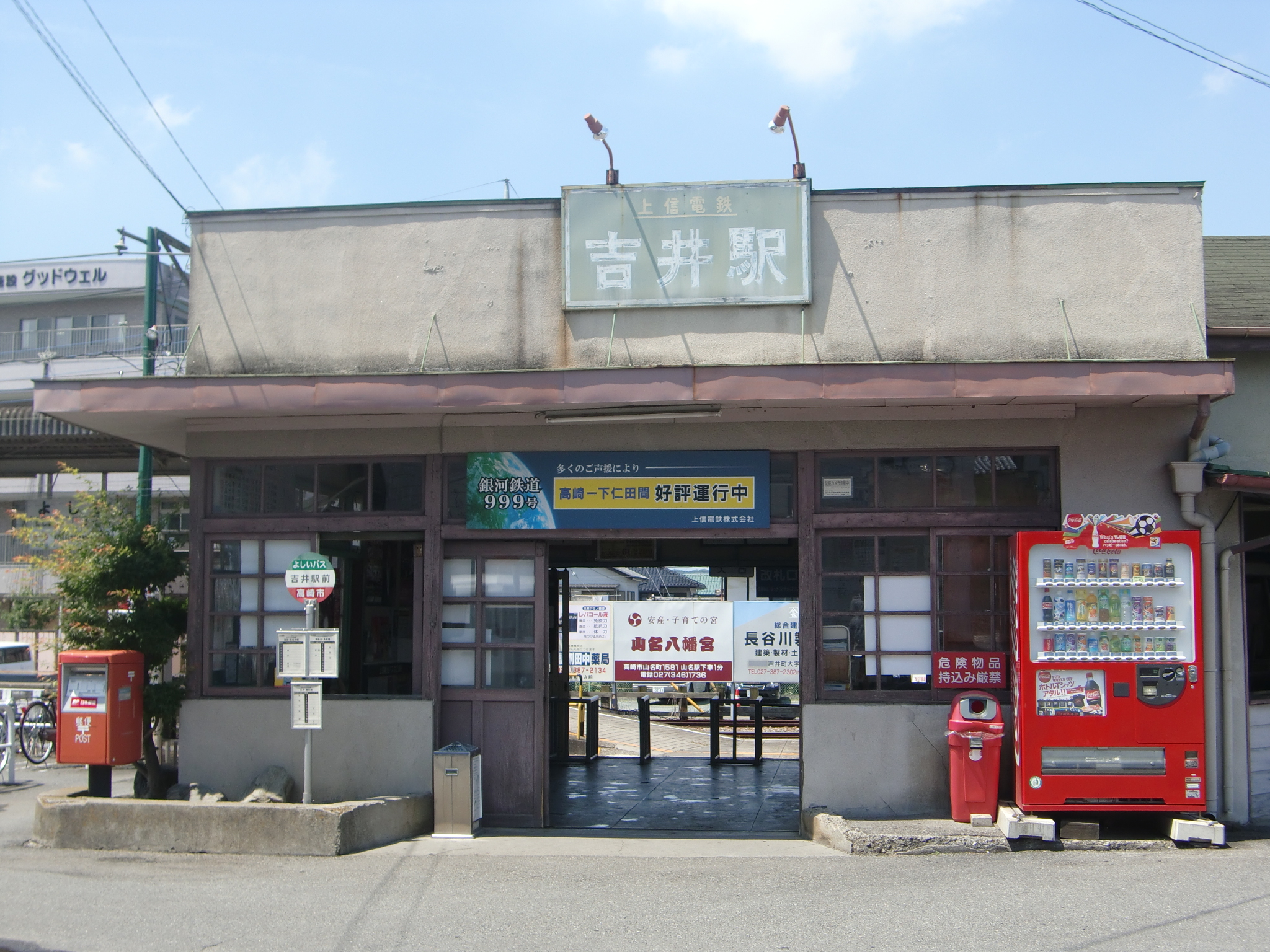
- Yoshii Station, October 2010

General information
- Location: Yoshii-machi Yoshii 219, Takasaki-shi, Gunma-ken 370-2132; Japan
- Coordinates: 36°15′21.48″N 138°59′4.57″E
- Operator: Jōshin Dentetsu
- Line: ■ Jōshin Line
- Distance: 11.7 km from Takasaki
- Platforms: 1 island platform

Other information
- Status: Unstaffed
- Website: Official website

History
- Opened: 5 May 1897

Passengers
- FY2019: 330

Services
Preceding station	Joshin Electric Railway	Following station
Nishi-Yoshii towards Shimonita	Jōshin Line	Maniwa towards Takasaki
Location
- Location within Gunma Prefecture Location within Japan

Yoshii Station (吉井駅, Yoshii-eki) is a passenger railway station in the city of Takasaki, Gunma, Japan, operated by the private railway operator Jōshin Dentetsu.

== Lines ==
Yoshii Station is a station on the Jōshin Line and is 11.7 kilometers from the terminus of the line at Takasaki.

== Station layout ==
The station consists of a single island platform connected to the station building by a level crossing.

=== Platforms ===
1	■ Jōshin Line	for Shimonita
2	■ Jōshin Line	for Takasaki

== History ==
Yoshii Station opened on 5 May 1897.

== Surrounding area ==
- National Route 254
- Yoshii Post Office
- Yoshii Onsen

== See also ==
- List of railway stations in Japan
