= Jōshū-Fukushima Station =

Railway station in Kanra, Gunma Prefecture, Japan

Jōshū-Fukushima Station 上州福島駅
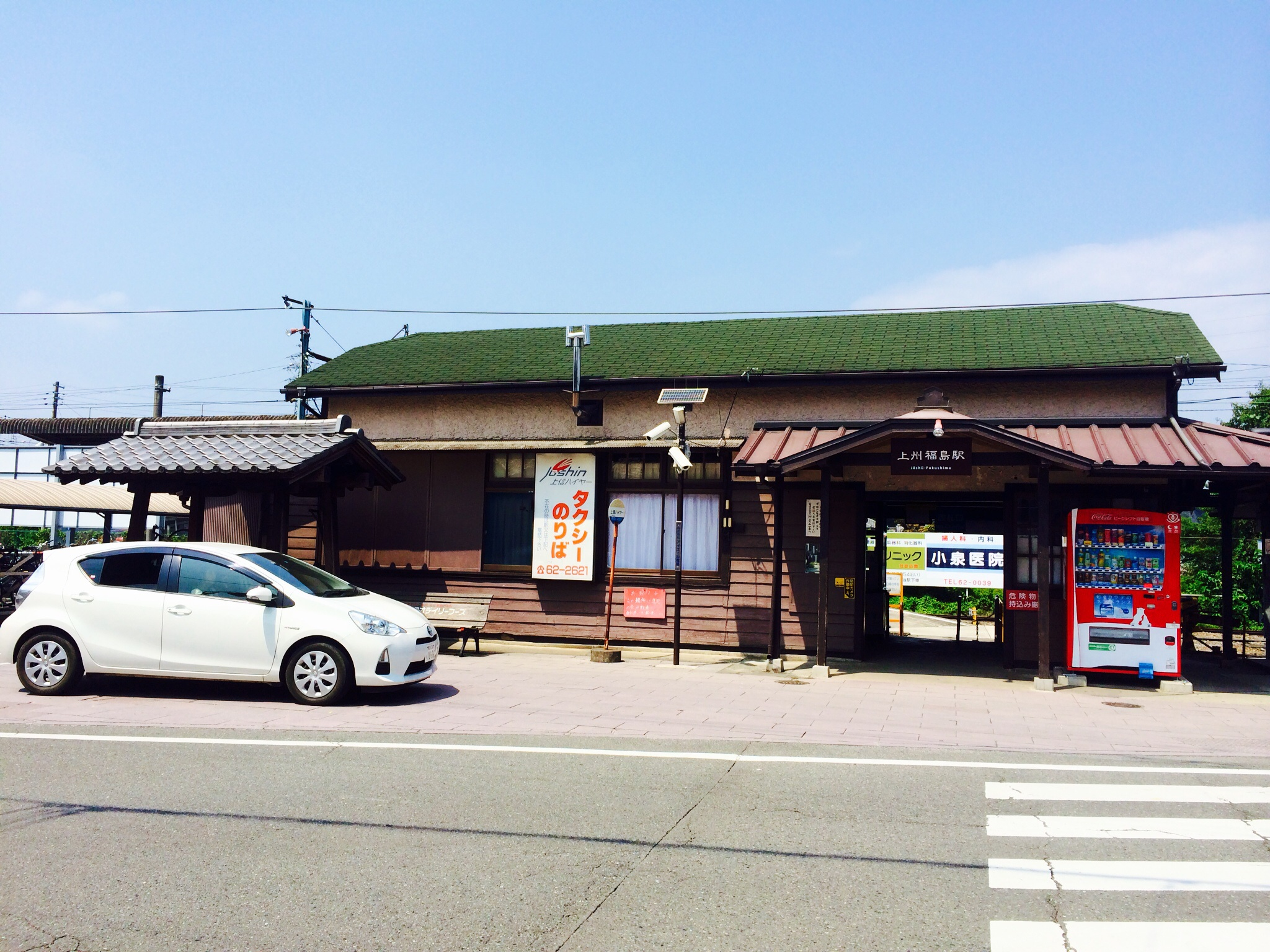
- Jōshū-Fukushima Station, 2016

General information
- Location: Fukushima 664-5, Kanra-machi, Kanra-gun, Gunmaken 370-2212; Japan
- Coordinates: 36°15′22.71″N 138°55′46.83″E
- Operator: Jōshin Dentetsu
- Line: ■ Jōshin Line
- Distance: 16.6 km from Takasaki
- Platforms: 1 island platform

Other information
- Status: Unstaffed
- Website: Official website

History
- Opened: 5 May 1897
- Former names: Fukushima (until 1921)

Passengers
- FY2018: 297

Services
Preceding station	Joshin Electric Railway	Following station
Higashi-Tomioka towards Shimonita	Jōshin Line	Jōshū-Niiya towards Takasaki
Location
- Location within Gunma Prefecture Location within Japan

Jōshū-Fukushima Station (上州福島駅, Jōshū-Fukushima-eki) is a passenger railway station in the town of Kanra, Gunma, Japan, operated by the private railway operator Jōshin Dentetsu.

== Lines ==
Jōshū-Fukushima Station is a station on the Jōshin Line and is 16.6 kilometers from the terminus of the line at Takasaki.

== Station layout ==
The station consists of a single island platform connected to the station building by a level crossing.

=== Platforms ===
1	■ Jōshin Line	for Shimonita
2	■ Jōshin Line	for Takasaki

== History ==
Jōshū-Fukushima Station opened on 10 May 1897 as Fukushima Station (福島駅, Fukushima-eki). It was renamed to its present name on 17 December 1921.

== Surrounding area ==
- Fukushima Post Office
- Kanra Town Hal
- former Obama Domain castle town

== See also ==
- List of railway stations in Japan
