= Joshin 7000 series =

Japanese train type

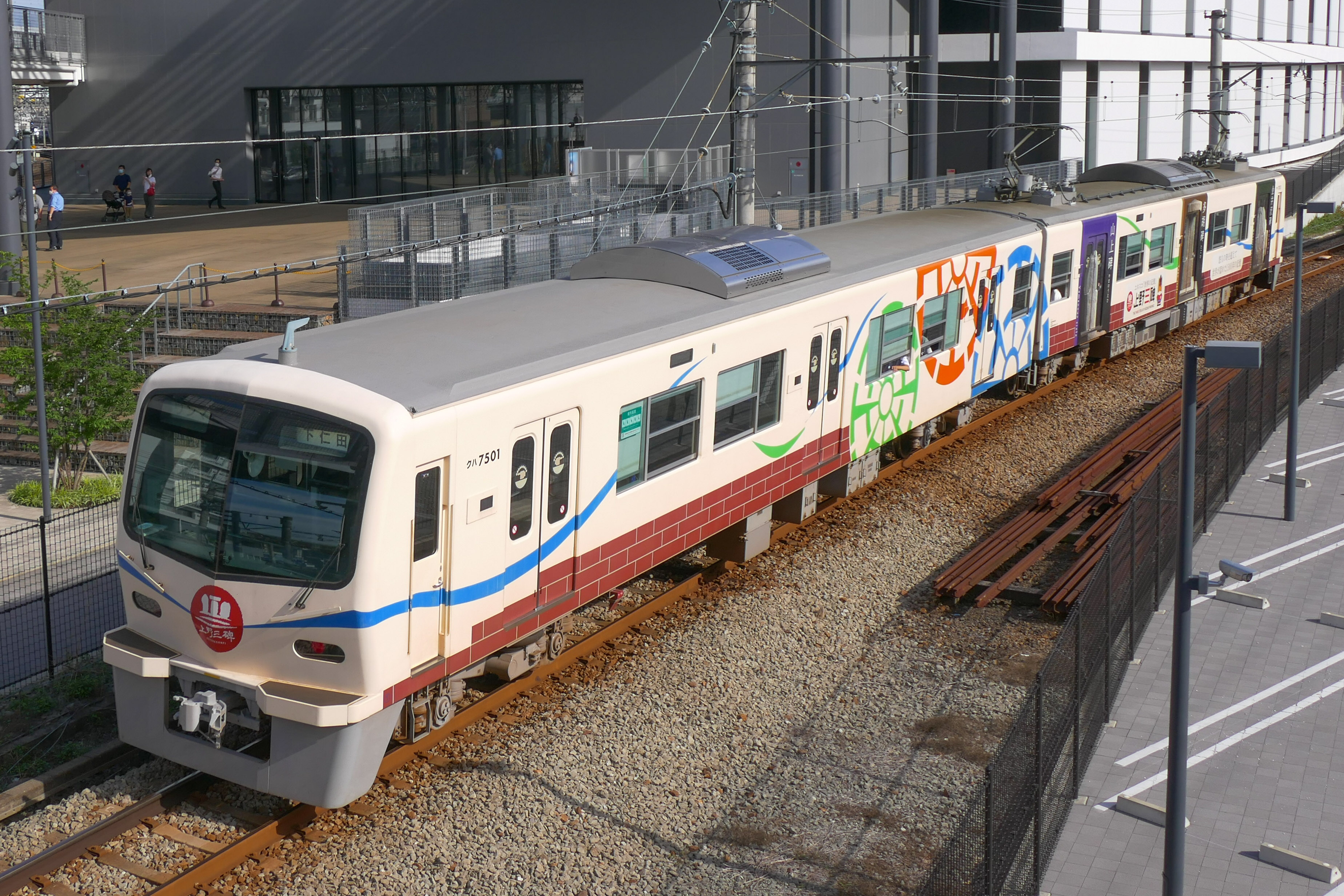
- Set 7001 in June 2021
- In service: December 2013 –
- Manufacturer: Niigata Transys
- Constructed: 2013
- Number built: 2 vehicles (1 set)
- Number in service: 2 vehicles (1 set)
- Formation: 2 cars per trainset
- Capacity: 282 per set
- Operator: Joshin Electric Railway
- Line served: Joshin Line

Specifications
- Car length: 20,500 mm (67 ft 3 in)
- Width: 2,800 mm (9 ft 2 in)
- Height: 4,140 mm (13 ft 7 in)
- Doors: 3 pairs per side
- Maximum speed: 90 km/h (56 mph)
- Acceleration: 3.3 km/(h⋅s) (2.1 mph/s)
- Deceleration: 3.5 km/(h⋅s) (2.2 mph/s) (service); 4.0 km/(h⋅s) (2.5 mph/s)(emergency)
- Electric system: 1,500 V DC
- Current collection: Overhead lines
- Bogies: NF05D (motored), NF05T (trailer)
- Safety system: ATS
- Track gauge: 1,067 mm (3 ft 6 in)

The Joshin 7000 series (上信電鉄7000形, Jōshin Dentetsu 7000-gata) is an electric multiple unit (EMU) train type operated by the private railway operator Joshin Electric Railway on the Joshin Line in Gunma Prefecture, Japan, since December 2013.

== Formation ==
As of 1 April 2015, the company operates one two-car set, consisting of one motored ("Mc") car and one unpowered trailer ("Tc") car, and is formed as shown below.

Designation	Mc	Tc
Numbering	KuMoHa 7001	KuHa 7501

The "Mc" car is fitted with two KP3274 single-arm pantographs.

== Interior ==
Passenger accommodation consists of a mixture of transverse 4-person seating bays and longitudinal bench seating. The train does not have toilets.

== History ==
The set entered service from December 2013.
