= Sendaira Station =

Railway station in Tomioka, Gunma Prefecture, Japan

Sendaira Station 千平駅
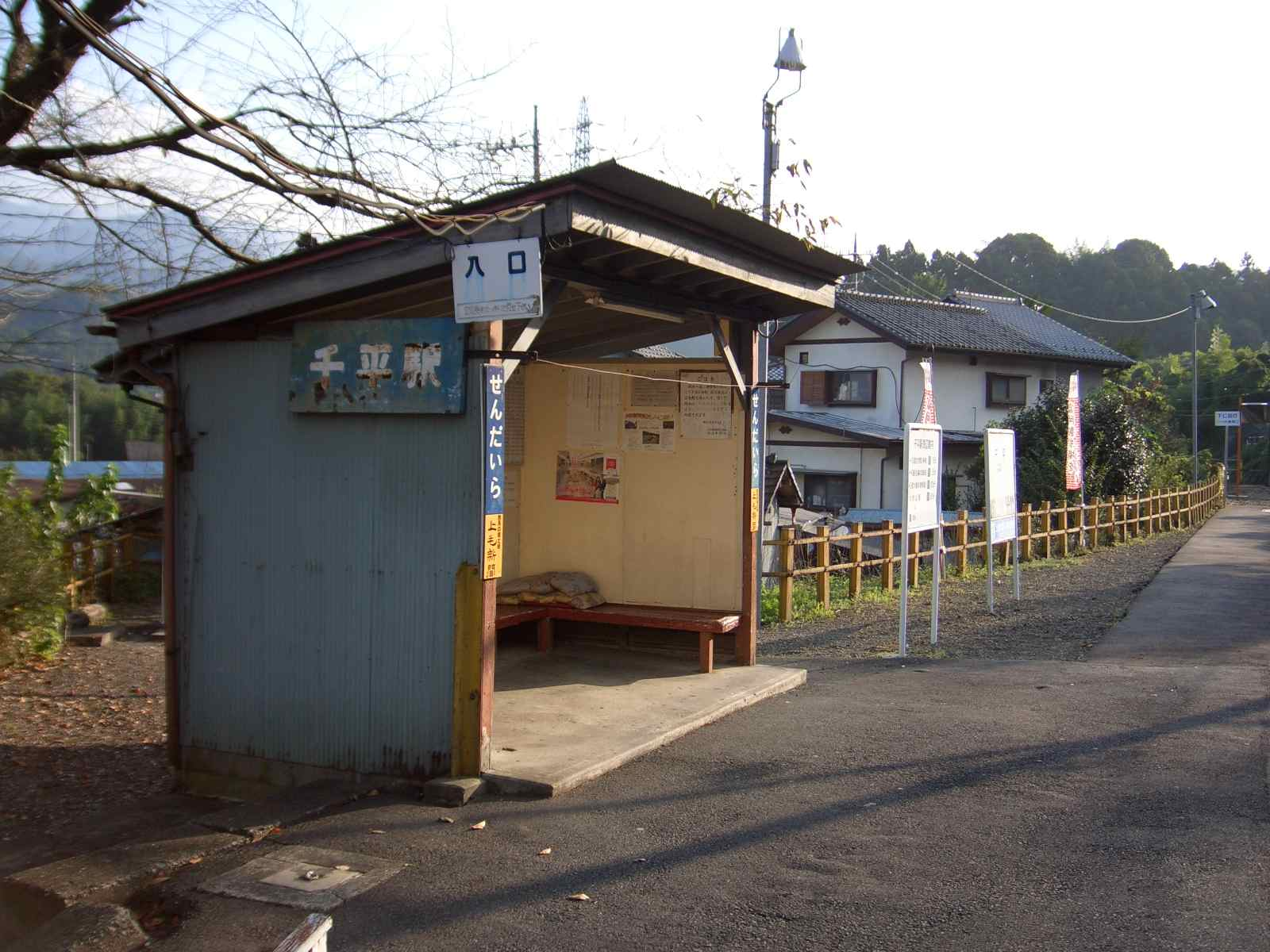
- Sendaira Station, October 2006

General information
- Location: Nanjai 2038, Tomioka-shi, Gunma-ken 370-2464; Japan
- Coordinates: 36.2299°N 138.7983°E
- Operator: Jōshin Dentetsu
- Line: ■ Jōshin Line
- Distance: 29.9 km from Takasaki
- Platforms: 1 side platform

Other information
- Status: Unstaffed
- Website: Official website

History
- Opened: 18 August 1911

Passengers
- FY2019: 13

Services
Preceding station	Joshin Electric Railway	Following station
Shimonita Terminus	Jōshin Line	Nanjai towards Takasaki
Location
- Location within Gunma Prefecture Location within Japan

Sendaira Station (千平駅, Sendaira-eki) is a passenger railway station in the city of Tomioka, Gunma, Japan, operated by the private railway operator Jōshin Dentetsu.

== Lines ==
Sendaira Station is a station on the Jōshin Line and is 29.9 kilometers from the terminus of the line at Takasaki.

== Station layout ==
The station consists of a single side platform serving traffic in both directions. There is no station building, but only a shelter on the platform. The station is unattended.

== History ==
Sendaira Station opened on 18 August 1911.

== Surrounding area ==
The station is located in an isolated rural area.

== See also ==
- List of railway stations in Japan
