= Jōshin Dentetsu Jōshin Line =

Railway line in Gunma prefecture, Japan

Joshin Dentetsu Joshin Line
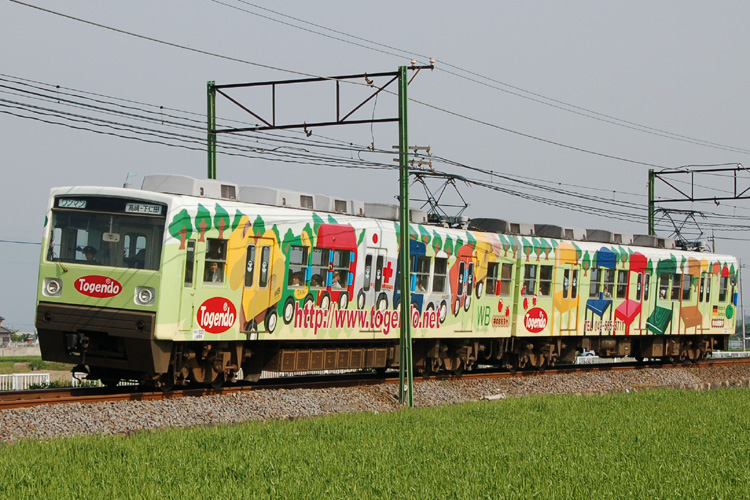
- A Joshin Electric Railway 1000 series EMU

Overview
- Owner: Joshin Electric Railway
- Locale: Gunma Prefecture
- Termini: Takasaki; Shimonita
- Stations: 21

History
- Opened: 10 May 1897

Technical
- Line length: 33.7 km (20.9 mi)
- Number of tracks: Single
- Track gauge: 1,067 mm (3 ft 6 in)
- Minimum radius: 160 m
- Electrification: 1,500 V DC, overhead catenary
- Operating speed: 85 km/h (55 mph)
Route map

The Joshin Line (上信線, Jōshin-sen) is a Japanese railway line in Gunma Prefecture, between Takasaki Station in Takasaki and Shimonita Station in Shimonita, operated by the private railway operator Joshin Electric Railway (上信電鉄, Joshin Dentetsu). This is the only rail line operated by the company, although it also operates a small number of bus lines. The first section of the Joshin Line opened in 1897.

== Rolling stock ==
As of 1 April 2017, the following rolling stock is used on the line.

- 150 series 2-car EMUs x3 (former Seibu Railway 101 series EMUs made in 1979)
- 200/250 series single-car and two-car EMUs(made in 1981)
- 500 series 2-car EMUs x2 (former Seibu Railway EMUs)
- 700 series 2-car EMUs (former JR East 107 series EMUs; since March 2019)
- 1000 series 2-car EMU x1(made in 1976)
- 6000 series 2-car EMU x1(made in 1981)
- 7000 series 2-car EMU x1 (since December 2013)
- Class DeKi 1 electric locomotives DeKi 1 and 3 (built by Siemens)
- Class ED31 electric locomotive ED31 6 (former JNR Class ED31)

The 1000 and 6000 series EMUs purchased new are unusual in having the driver's seat on the right-hand side facing the direction of travel.

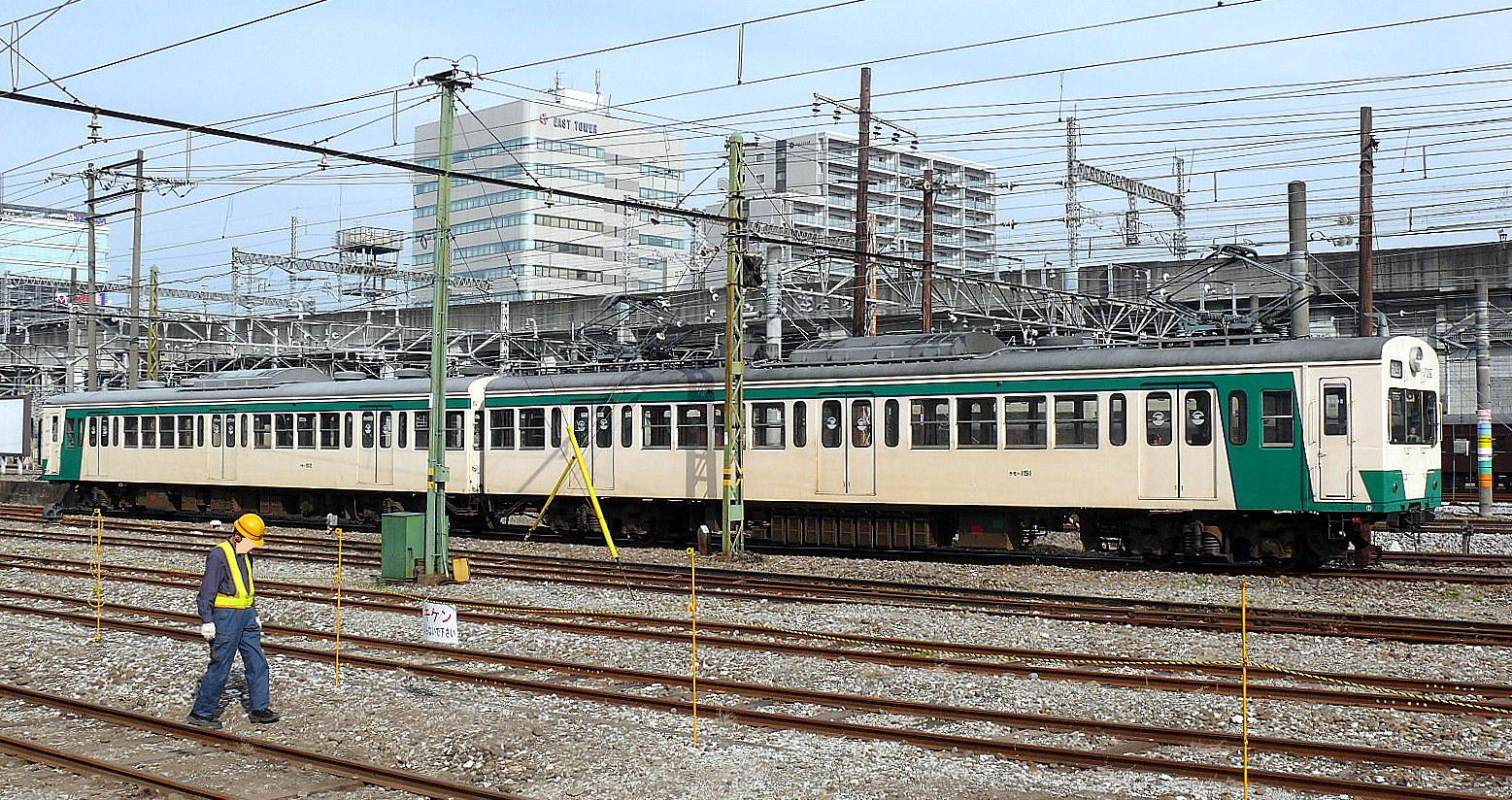
A 150 series EMU in November 2009

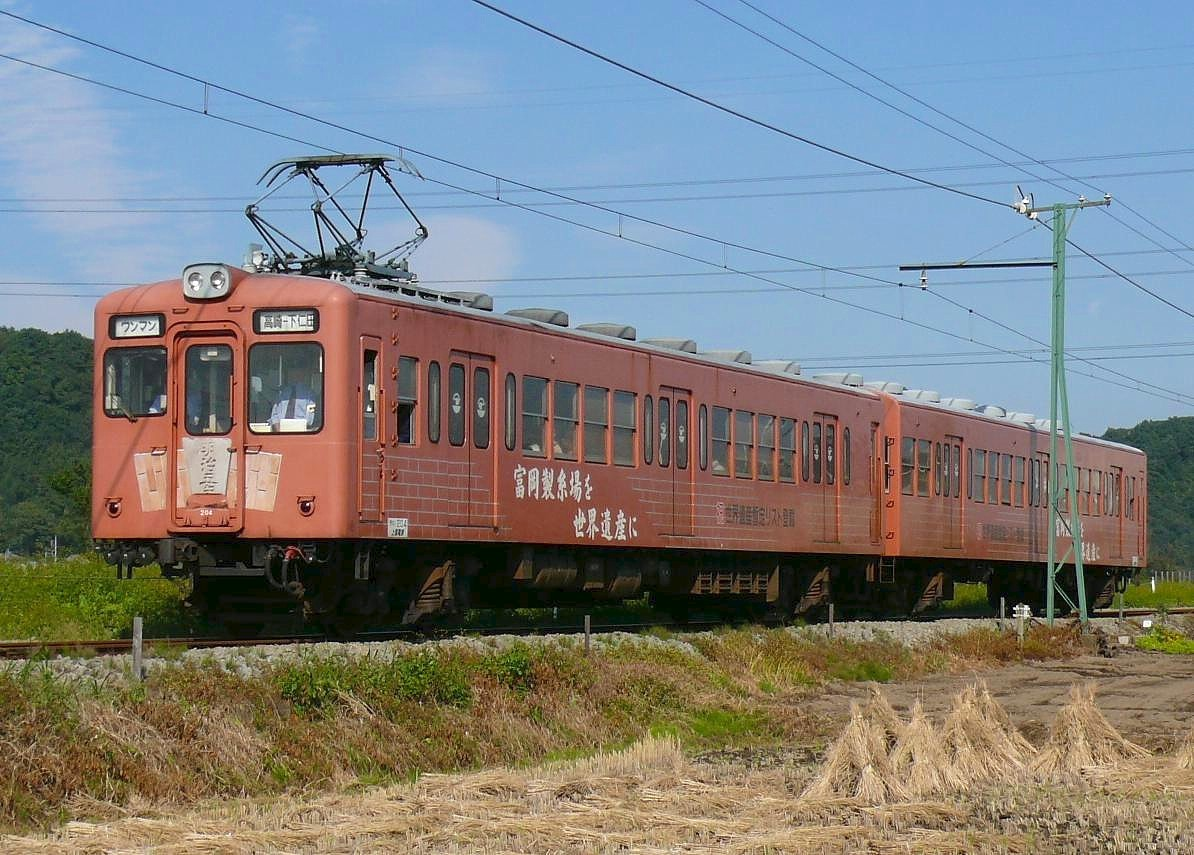
A 200 series 2-car EMU in October 2007

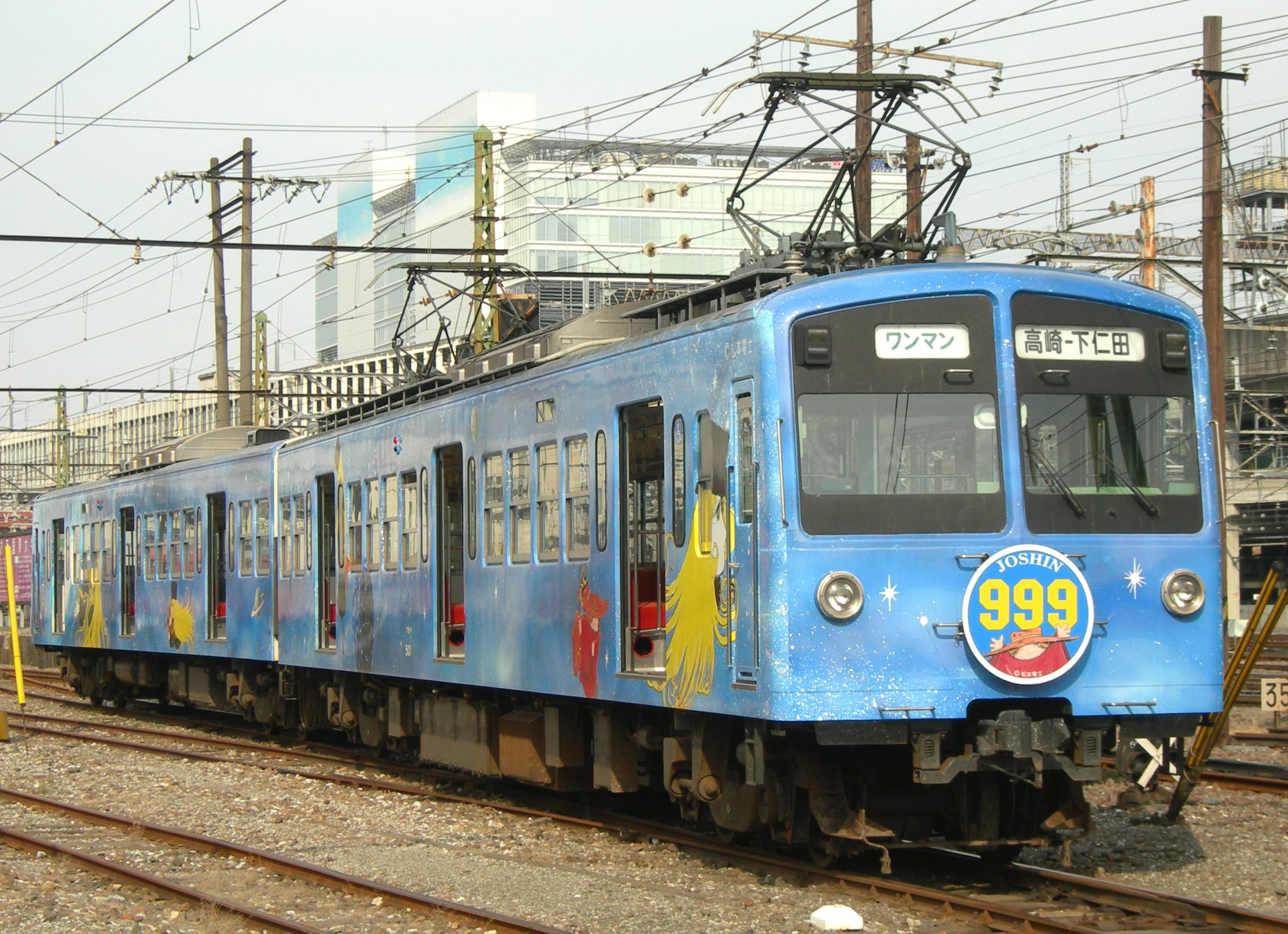
A 500 series EMU in November 2009

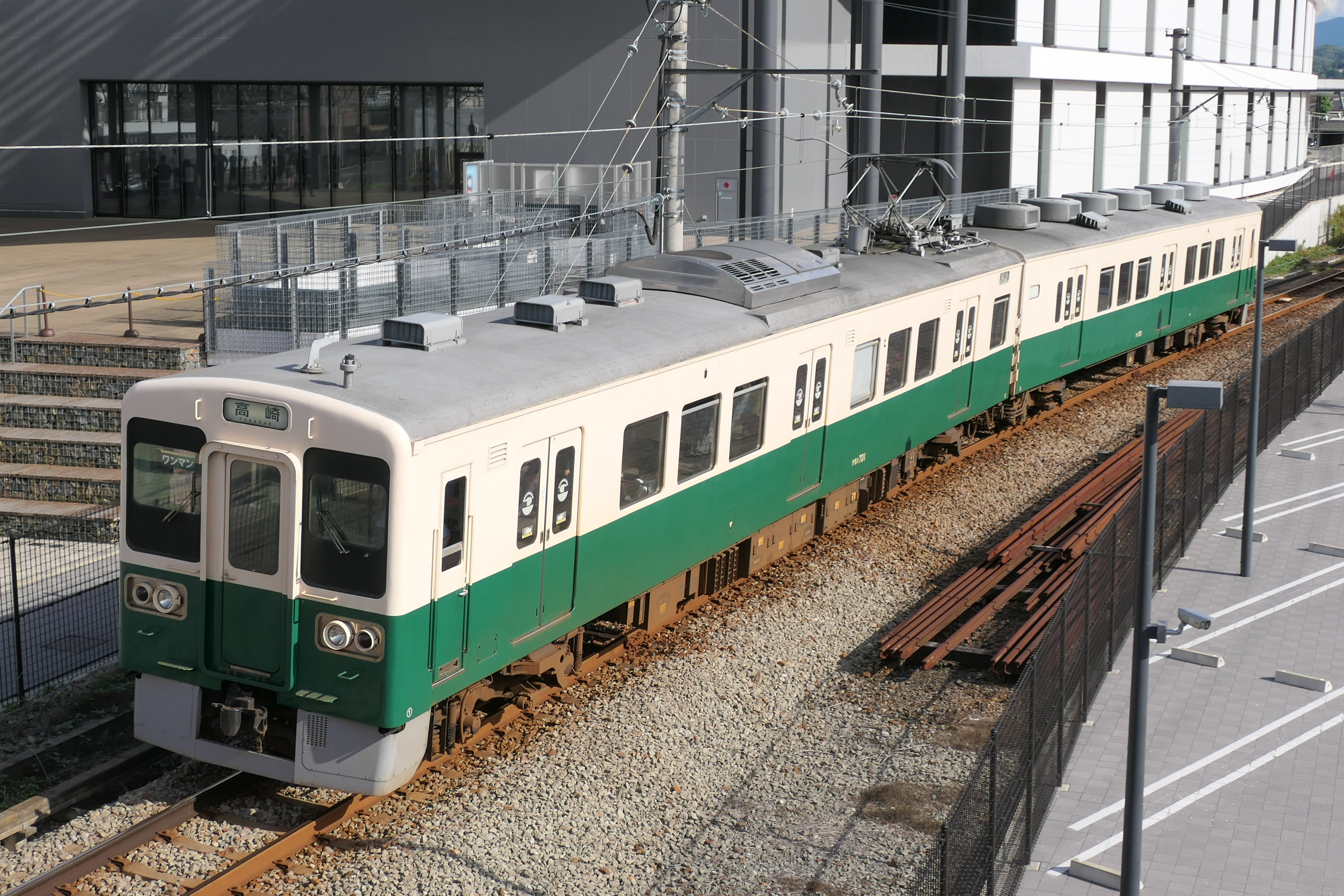
A 700 series EMU in June 2021

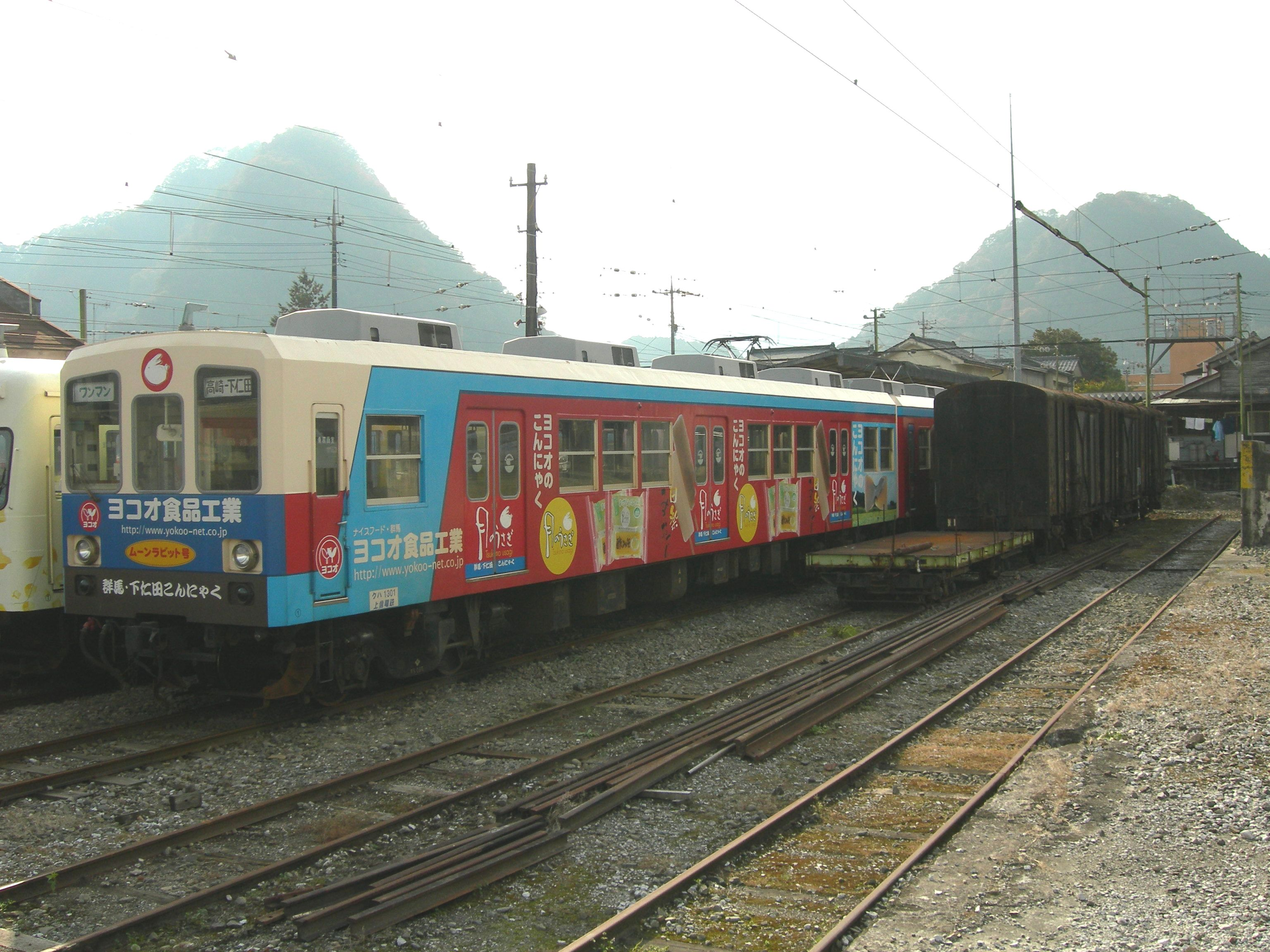
A 1000 series EMU in November 2009

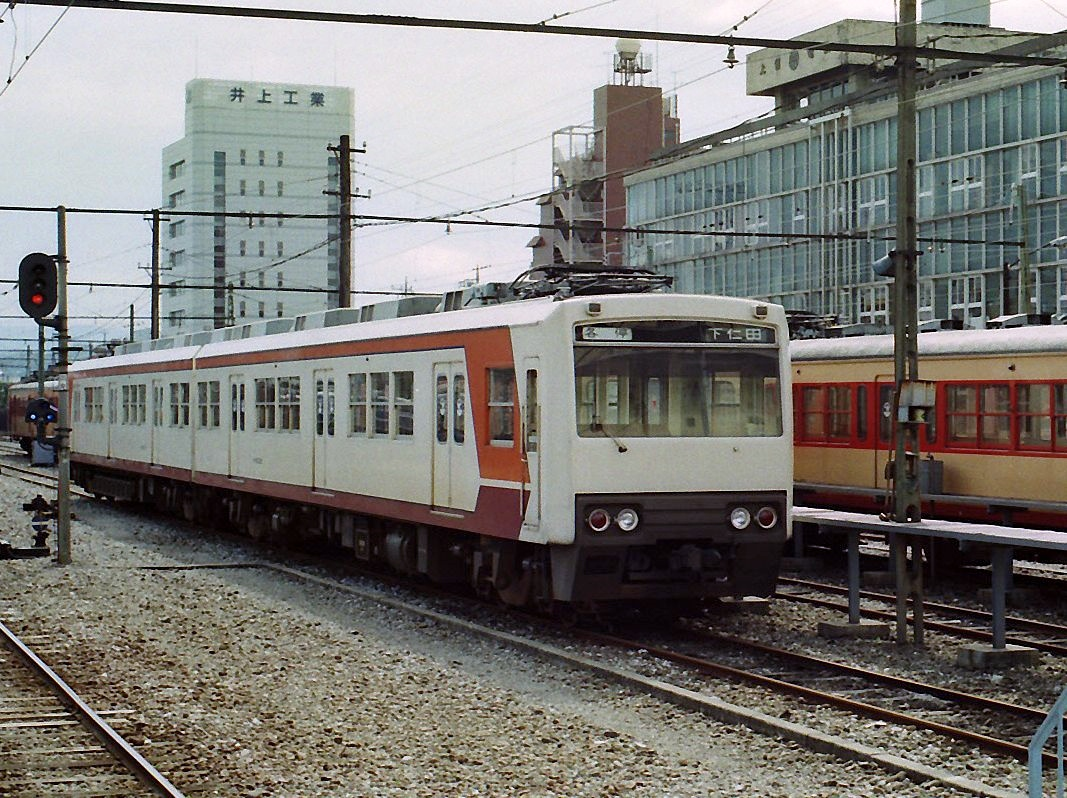
A 6000 series EMU in October 1989

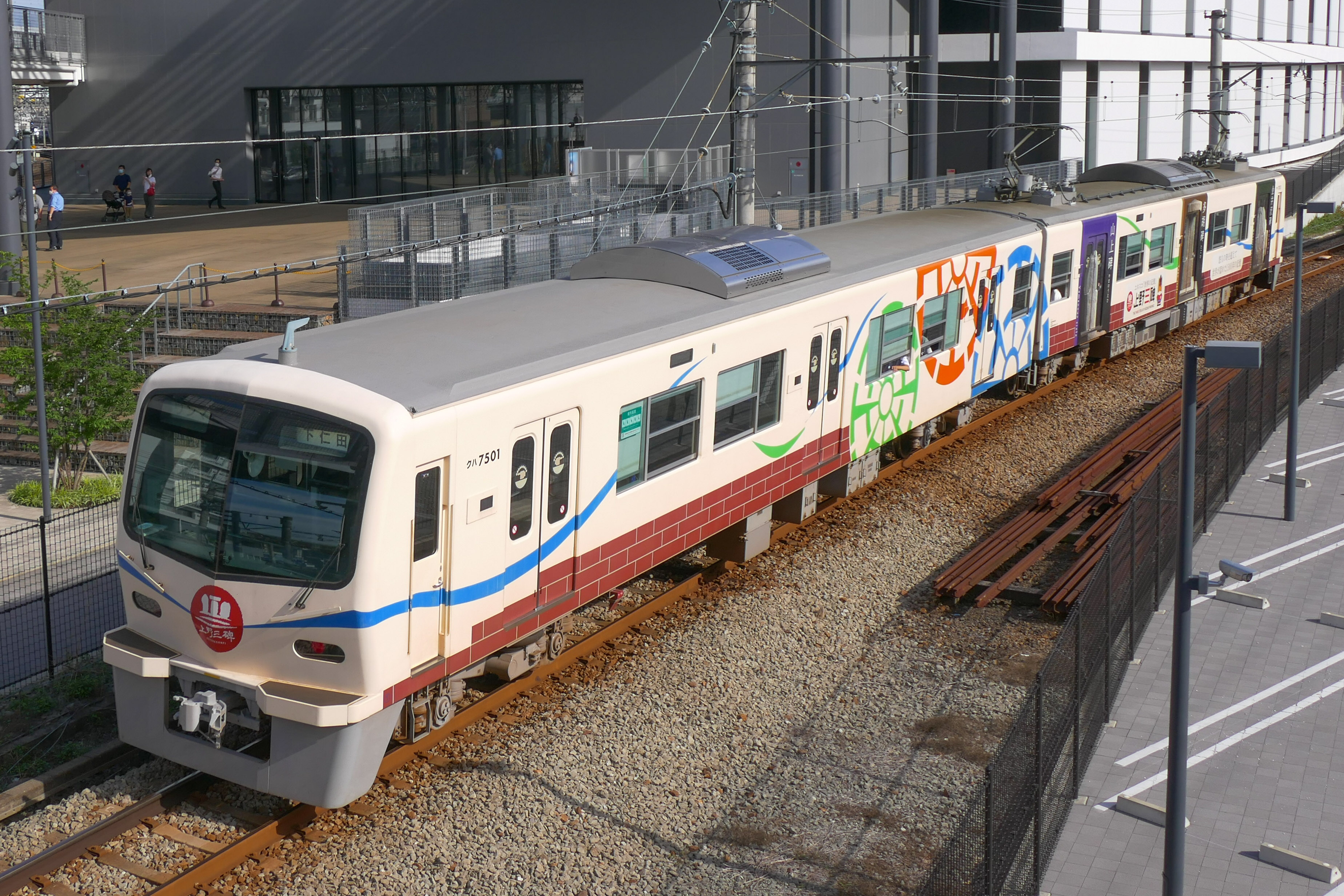
A 7000 series EMU in June 2021

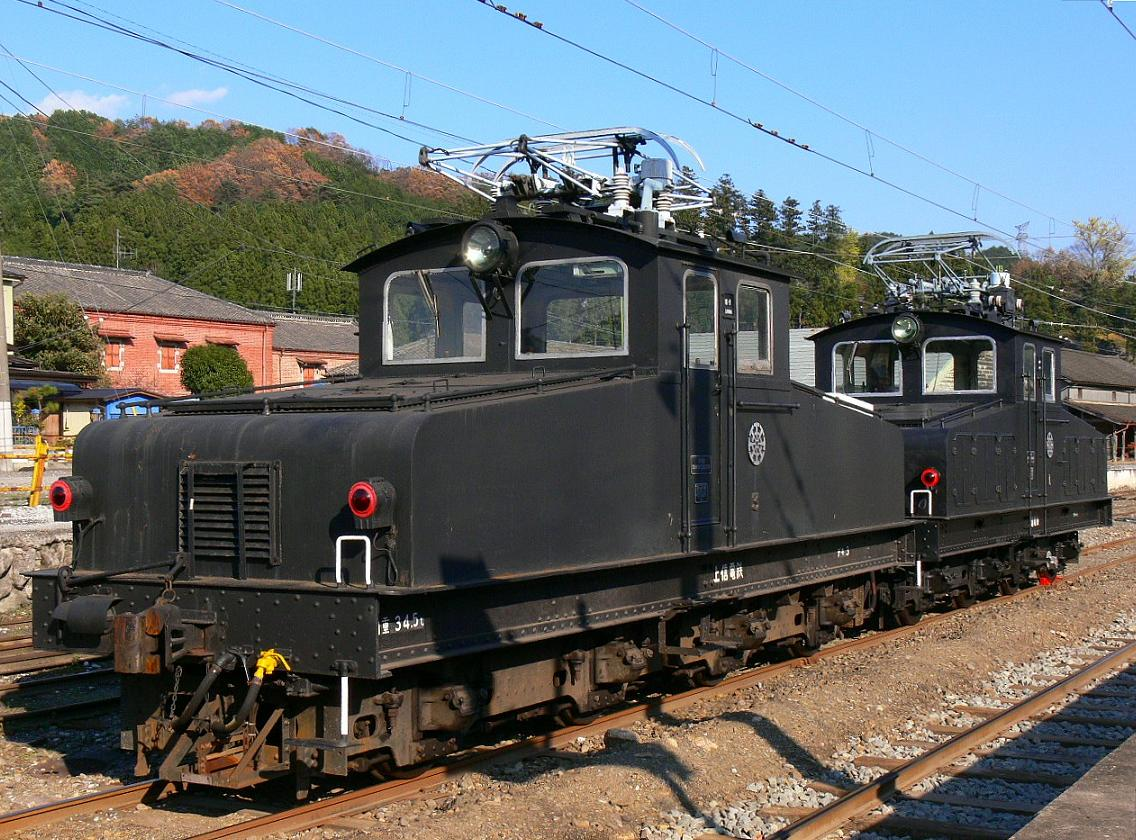
Electric locomotives DeKi 1 and 3 in October 2007

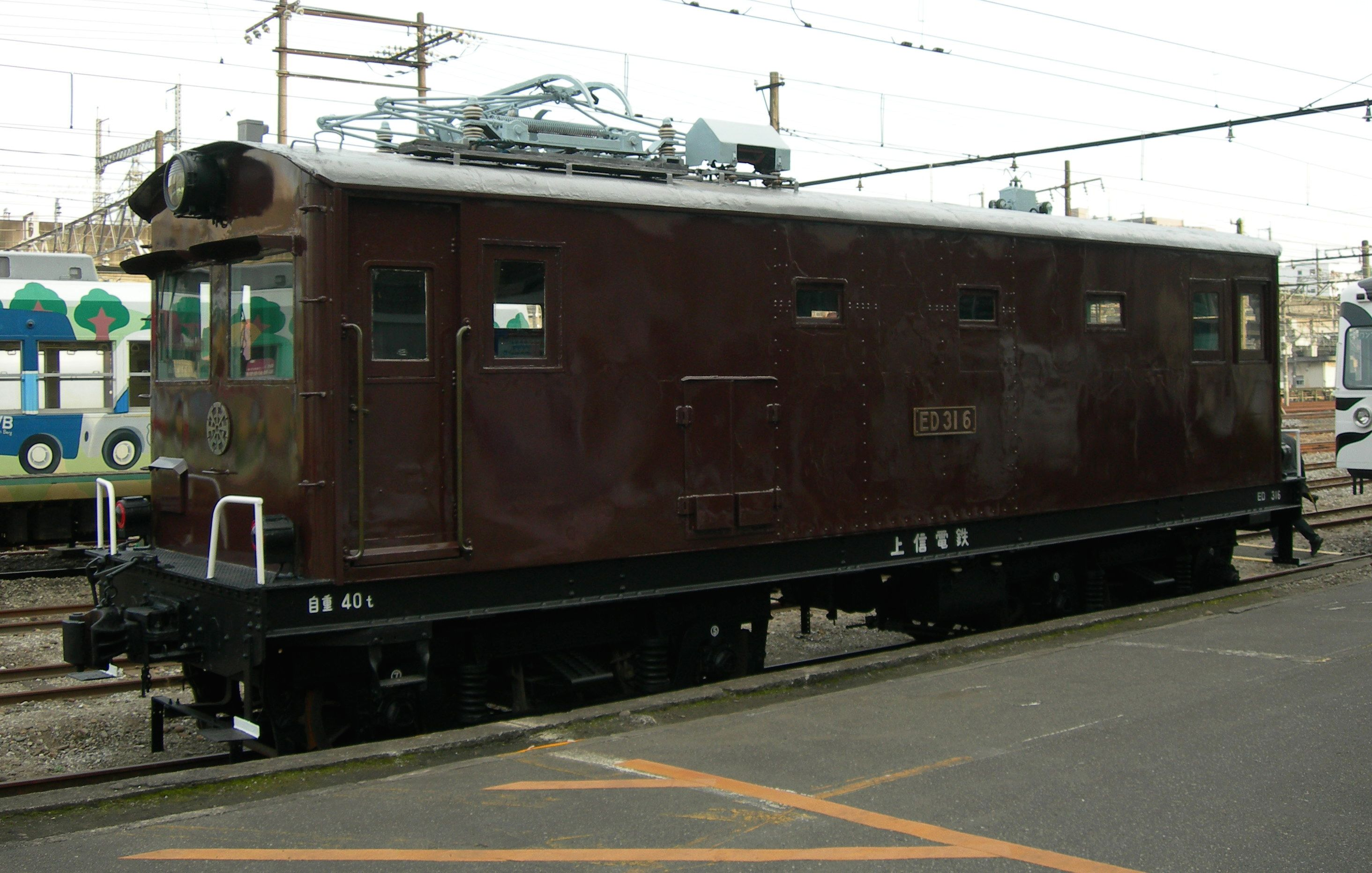
Electric locomotive ED31 6 in November 2009

== History ==
The line opened on 10 May 1897, as a 762 mm (2 ft 6 in) gauge steam-hauled railway line from Takasaki to Fukushima (present-day Jōshū-Fukushima), operated by the Kōzuke Railway (上野鉄道, Kōzuke Tetsudō). The entire line to Shimonita was opened on 25 September in the same year. The line was planned to be extended southward from Shimonita to connect with the Saku Railway (present-day Koumi Line) at Haguroshita, and the owning company was accordingly renamed Joshin Electric Railway (上信電鉄, Jōshin Denki Tetsudō) from 25 August 1921. The line was ultimately never extended, but the track was regauged to 1,067 mm (3 ft 6 in) and electrified with an overhead wire at 1,500 V DC.

Freight operations on the line were discontinued from 1 October 1994.

On 30 November 2003, Takasaki Fairy Land which was a leisure complex being established as "Kappa Pia" in 1961 was discontinued. In this leisure complex, "NAKASONE FESTIVAL" was held during summer because "Matsugoro Nakasone" who is a father of Yasuhiro Nakasone was a CEO of Joshi Electric Railway.

== Stations ==
Station	Japanese	Distance (km)		Transfers	Location
Station	Japanese	Between stations	Total	Transfers	Location
Takasaki	高崎駅	-	0.0	Joetsu Shinkansen; Hokuriku Shinkansen; Takasaki Line; Shōnan–Shinjuku Line; Ueno–Tokyo Line; Jōetsu Line; Agatsuma Line; Ryōmō Line and Shin'etsu Main Line	Takasaki, Gunma
Minami-Takasaki	南高崎駅	0.9	0.9		Takasaki, Gunma
Sanonowatashi	佐野のわたし駅	1.3	2.2		Takasaki, Gunma
Negoya	根小屋駅	1.5	3.7		Takasaki, Gunma
Takasaki-Shōka-Daigakumae	高崎商科大学前駅	1.3	5.0		Takasaki, Gunma
Yamana	山名駅	1.1	6.1		Takasaki, Gunma
Nishi-Yamana	西山名駅	0.9	7.0		Takasaki, Gunma
Maniwa	馬庭駅	2.4	9.4		Takasaki, Gunma
Yoshii	吉井駅	2.3	11.7		Takasaki, Gunma
Nishi-Yoshii	西吉井駅	1.7	13.4		Takasaki, Gunma
Jōshū-Niiya	上州新屋駅	1.2	14.6		Kanra, Gunma
Jōshū-Fukushima	上州福島駅	2.0	16.6		Kanra, Gunma
Higashi-Tomioka	東富岡駅	2.7	19.3		Tomioka, Gunma
Jōshū-Tomioka	上州富岡駅	0.9	20.2		Tomioka, Gunma
Nishi-Tomioka	西富岡駅	0.8	21.0		Tomioka, Gunma
Jōshū-Nanokaichi	上州七日市駅	0.8	21.8		Tomioka, Gunma
Jōshū-Ichinomiya	上州一ノ宮駅	1.3	23.1		Tomioka, Gunma
Kanohara	神農原駅	2.3	25.4		Tomioka, Gunma
Nanjai	南蛇井駅	2.8	28.2		Tomioka, Gunma
Sendaira	千平駅	1.7	29.9		Tomioka, Gunma
Shimonita	下仁田駅	2.7	33.7		Shimonita, Gunma

== See also ==
- List of railway companies in Japan
- List of railway lines in Japan
