= Kanra, Gunma =

Kanra 甘楽町
- Town
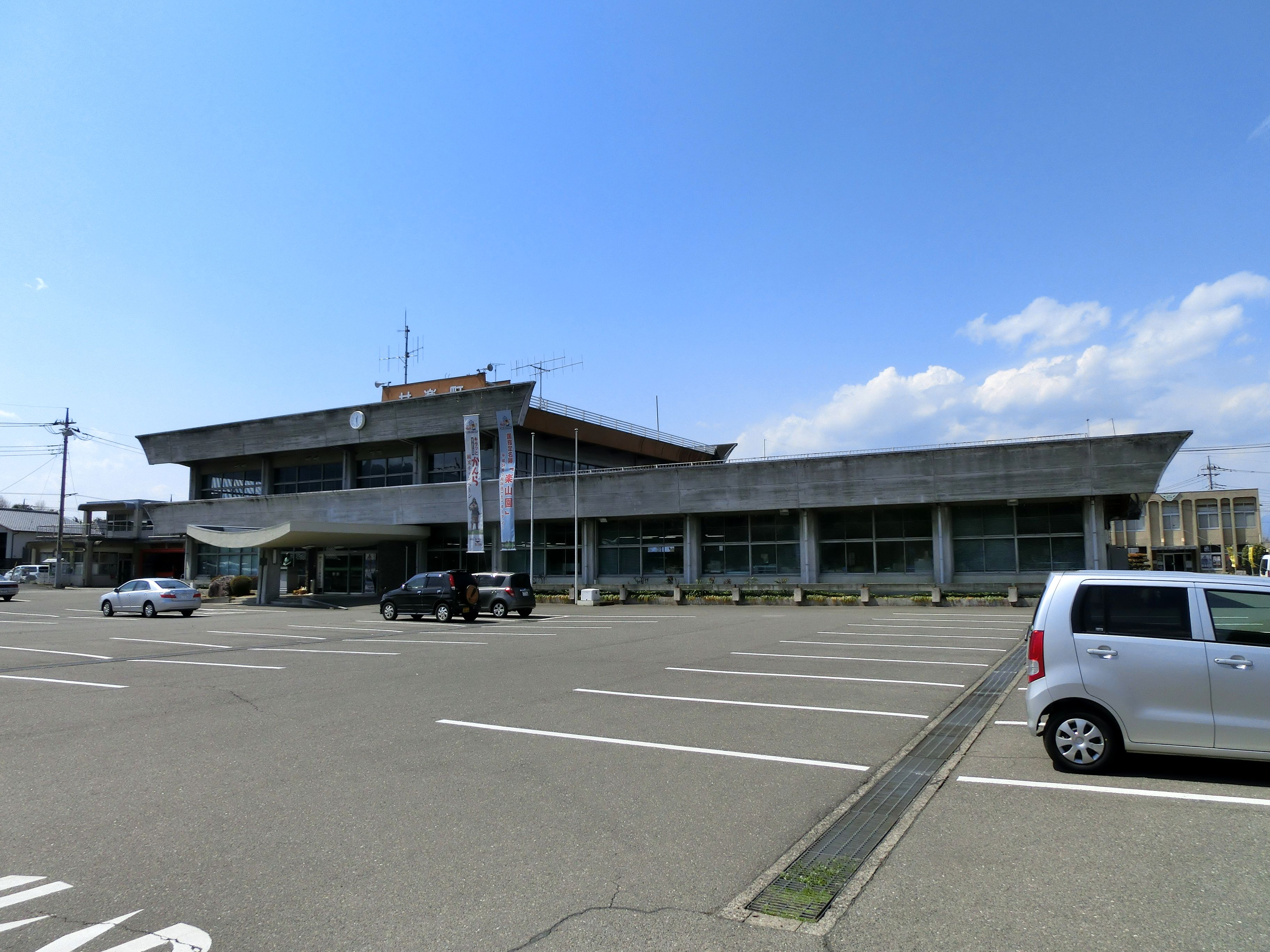
- Kanra town office

- Flag Seal

- Location of Kanra in Gunma Prefecture

- Coordinates: 36°14′34.8″N 138°55′18.3″E
- Country: Japan
- Region: Kantō
- Prefecture: Gunma
- District: Kanra

Area
  - Total: 58.61 km^{2} (22.63 sq mi)

Population (August 2020)
  - Total: 12,981
  - Density: 221.5/km^{2} (573.6/sq mi)
- Time zone: UTC+9 (Japan Standard Time)
- Tree: Japanese Red Pine
- Flower: Somei Yoshino cherry
- Bird: Green pheasant
- Phone number: 0274-74-3131
- Address: 161-1 Obata, Kanra-machi, Kanra-gun, Gunma-ken 370-2292
- Website: Official website

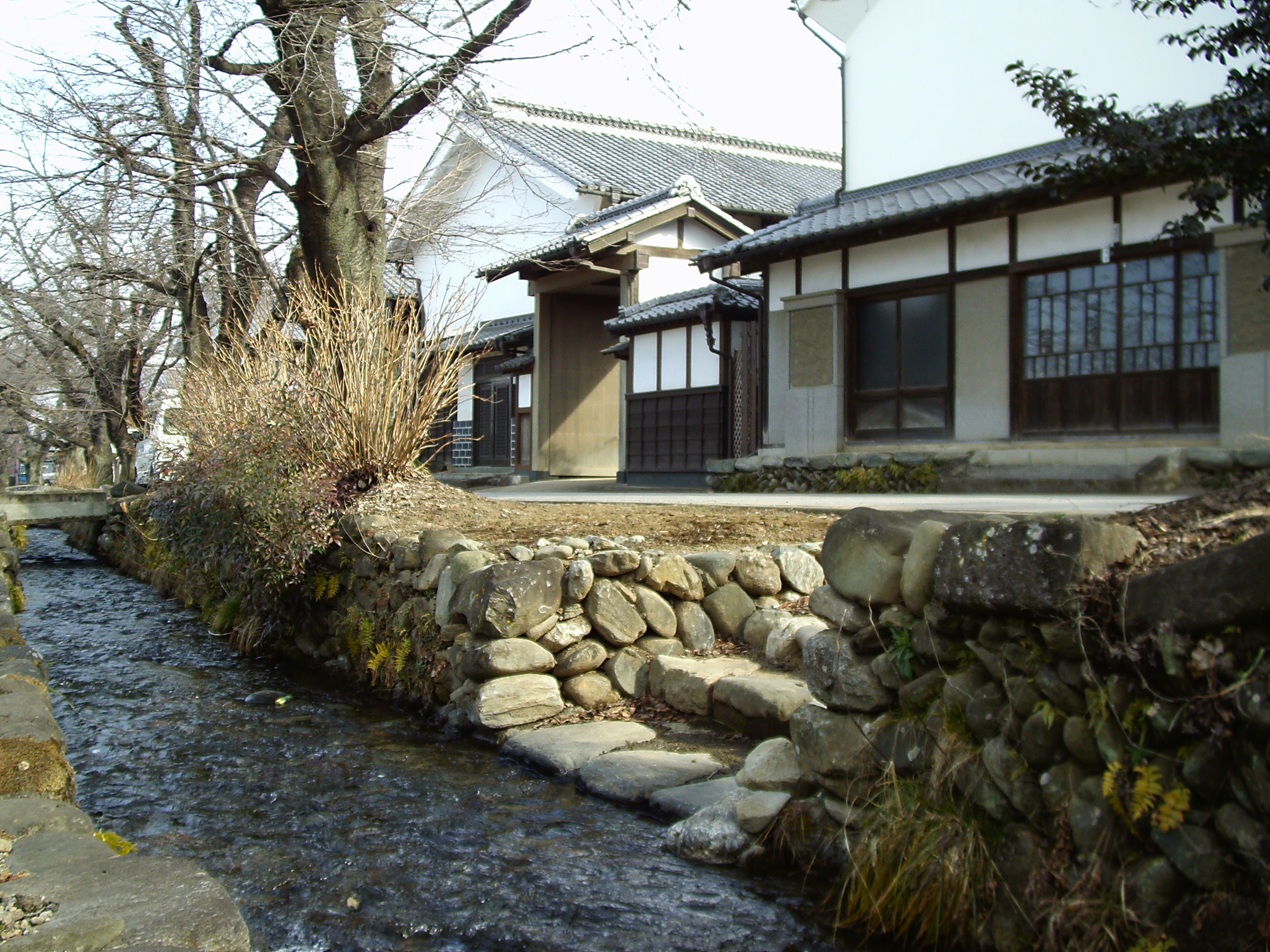
Old town of Obata in Kanra

Kanra (甘楽町, Kanra-machi) is a town located in Gunma Prefecture, Japan. As of 31 August 2020, the town had an estimated population of 21,749 in 8311 households, and a population density of 220 persons per km^{2}. The total area of the town is 58.61 square kilometres (22.63 sq mi).

== Geography ==
Kanra is located in the southwestern portion of Gunma Prefecture on the south bank of the Kabura River.

=== Surrounding municipalities ===
Gunma Prefecture

- Fujioka
- Shimonita
- Takasaki
- Tomioka

=== Climate ===
Kanra has a humid subtropical climate (Köppen Cfa) characterized by warm summers and cold winters with occasional snowfall. The average annual temperature in Kanra is 12.8 °C. The average annual rainfall is 1166 mm with September as the wettest month. The temperatures are highest on average in August, at around 25.4 °C, and lowest in January, at around 1.1 °C.

== Demographics ==
Per Japanese census data, the population of Kanra has remained relatively steady over the past 60 years.

Historical population
Year	Pop.	±%
1960	14,847	—
1970	13,615	−8.3%
1980	13,737	+0.9%
1990	14,343	+4.4%
2000	14,660	+2.2%
2010	13,609	−7.2%
2020	12,491	−8.2%

== History ==
During the Edo period, the center of present-day Kanra was the jōkamachi of Obata Domain, a feudal domain under the Tokugawa shogunate in Kōzuke Province. Obata village, Akihata village, Fukushima town, and Niiya village were created within Kitakanra District of Gunma Prefecture on April 1, 1889, with the creation of the modern municipalities system after the Meiji Restoration. In 1925 Obata village was elevated in status into Obata town. In 1950 Kitakanra District was renamed Kanra District. Akihata village merged with Obata in 1955, and Fukushima and Niiya villages were into Obata on February 1, 1959, creating Kanra town.

== Government ==
Kanra has a mayor-council form of government with a directly elected mayor and a unicameral town council of 12 members. Kanra, together with the other municipalities in Kanra District contributes one member to the Gunma Prefectural Assembly. In terms of national politics, the town is part of Gunma 5th district of the lower house of the Diet of Japan.

== Economy ==
The economy of Kanra is heavily dependent on agriculture.

== Education ==
Kanra has three public elementary schools and one public middle school operated by the town government. The town does not have a high school.

== Transportation ==
=== Railway ===
Jōshin Dentetsu - Jōshin Line

- Jōshū-Niiya - Jōshū-Fukushima

=== Highway ===
- Jōshin-etsu Expressway – Kanra PA
- National Route 254

== Sister cities ==
- Certaldo, Italy, friendship city since 1984

== Local attractions ==
- Rakusan-en gardens, National Place of Scenic Beauty.
