= Shimonita Station =

Railway station in Shimonita, Gunma Prefecture, Japan

Shimonita Station 下仁田駅
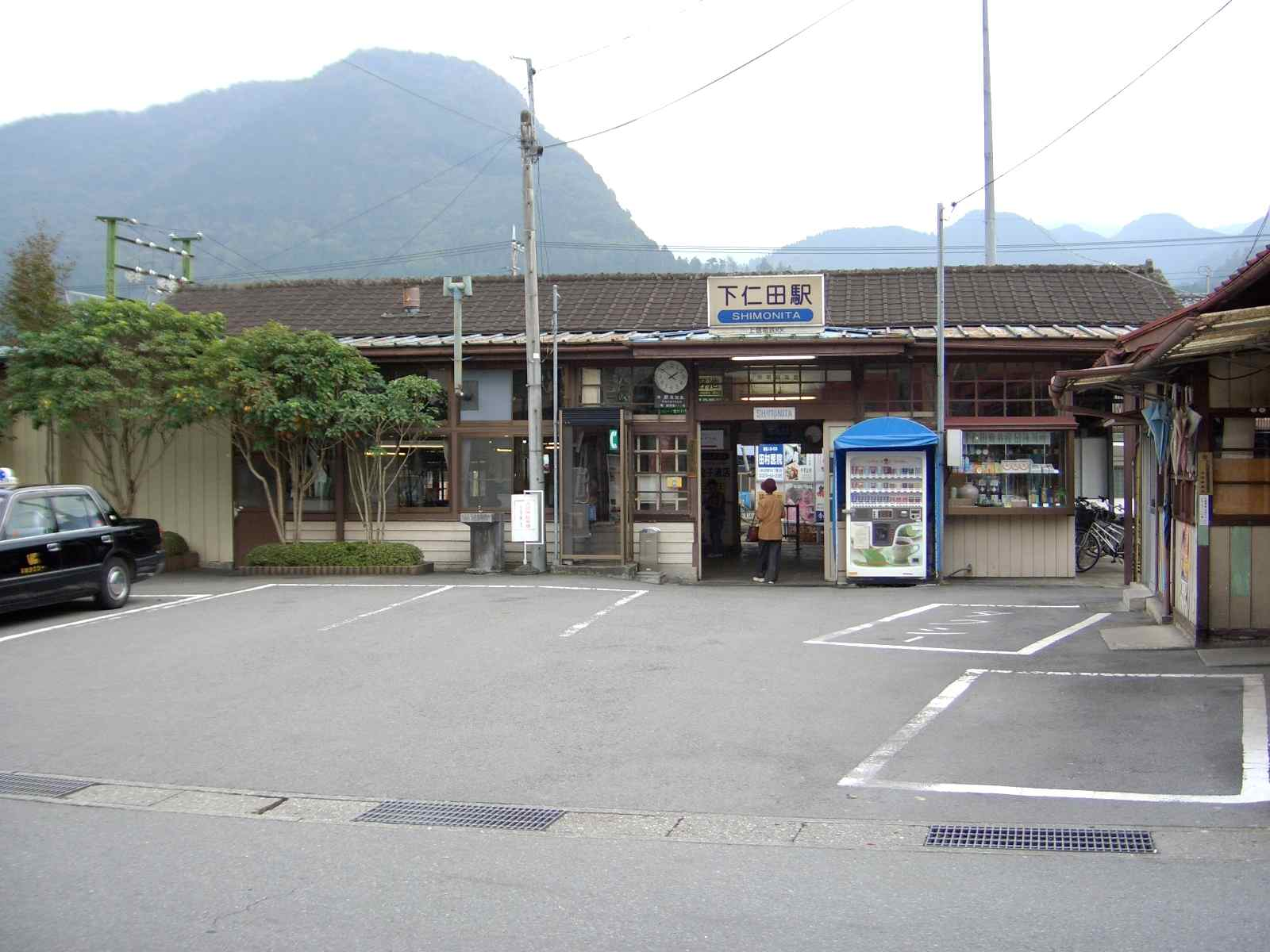
- Shimonita Station, October 2006

General information
- Location: 374 Shimonita, Shimonita-machi, Kanra-gun, Gunma-ken 370-2601; Japan
- Coordinates: 36.2106°N 138.7869°E
- Operator: Jōshin Dentetsu
- Line: ■ Jōshin Line
- Distance: 33.7 km (20.9 mi) from Takasaki
- Platforms: 2 bay platforms

Other information
- Website: Official website

History
- Opened: 8 September 1897; 128 years ago

Passengers
- FY2018: 240

Services
Preceding station	Joshin Electric Railway	Following station
Terminus	Jōshin Line	Sendaira towards Takasaki
Location
- Location within Gunma Prefecture Location within Japan

Shimonita Station (下仁田駅, Shimonita-eki) is a passenger railway station in the town of Shimonita, Gunma, Japan, operated by the private railway operator Jōshin Dentetsu.

== Lines ==
Shimonita Station is a terminal station of the Jōshin Line and is 33.7 kilometers from the opposing terminus of the line at Takasaki.

== Station layout ==
The station consists of a single bay platform serving four tracks, connected to the station building by a level crossing.

== History ==
Shimonita Station opened on 8 September 1897.

== Surrounding area ==
- Shimonita Town Hall
- Shimonita Post Office

== See also ==
- List of railway stations in Japan
