= Isezuka Kofun (Fujioka) =

Kofun period burial mound in Gunma, Japan

- 伊勢塚古墳 (Japanese)
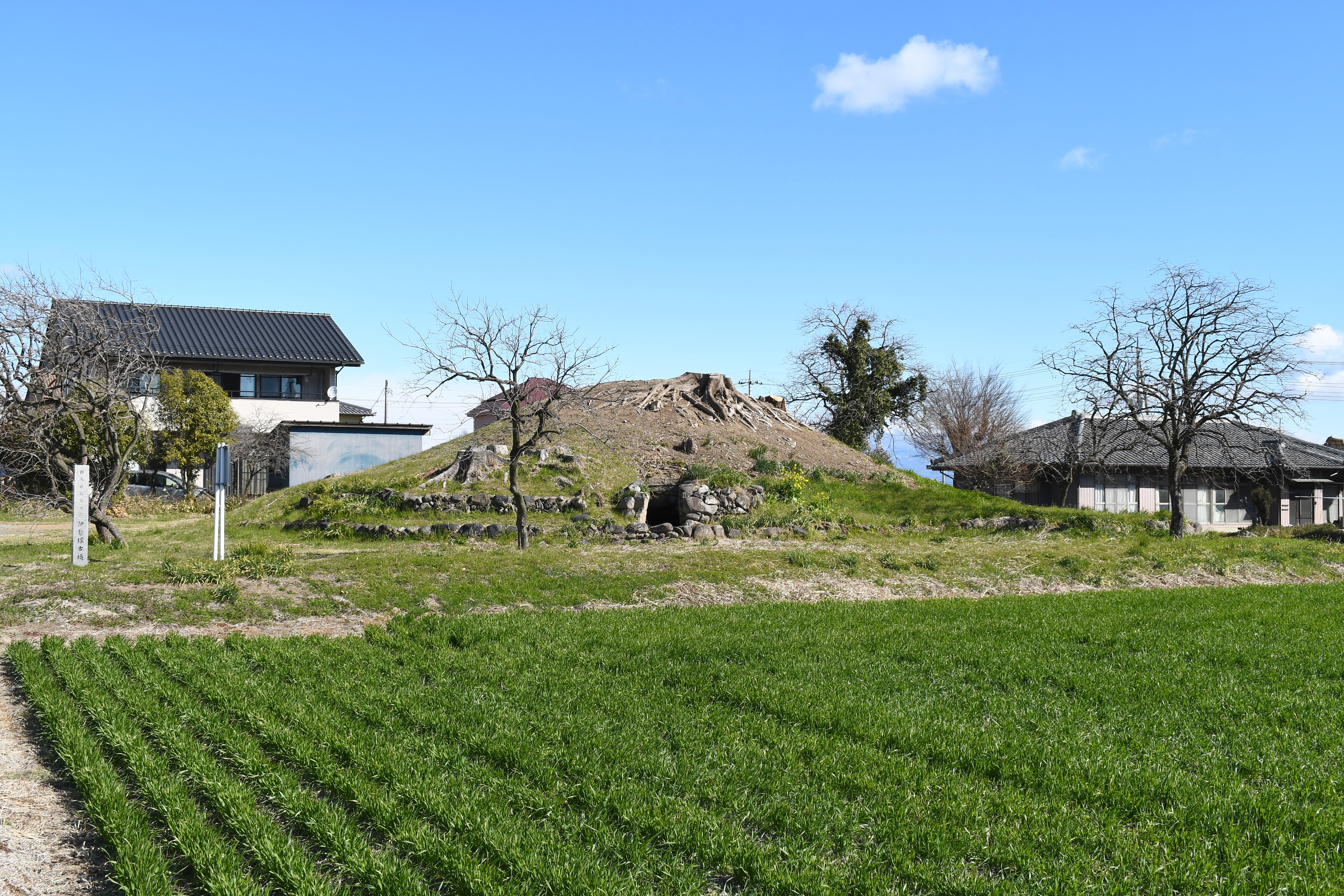
- Isezuka Kofun

- Isezuka Kofun Isezuka Kofun (Fujioka) (Japan)
- 36°15′55.85″N 139°2′24.20″E
- Type: Kofun
- Periods: Kofun period
- Location: 318 Kamiochiai-cho, Fujioka, Gunma, Japan
- Region: Kantō region

History
- Built: late 6th century

Site notes
- Public access: Yes (no facilities)
- Gunma Prefecture Historic Site

Isezuka Kofun (伊勢塚古墳) is a Kofun period burial mound, located in the Kamiochiai neighborhood of the city of Fujioka, Gunma in the Kantō region of Japan. The tumulus was designated a Gunma Prefecture Historic Site in 1973.. It is one of the burial mounds that make up the Shiroishi Kofun cluster, which also includes the Shiroishi Inariyama Kofun, a National Historic Site.

== Overview ==
The Isezuka Kofun is located on the lowest of three fluvial terraces formed by the right bank of the Kaburagawa River in southern Gunma Prefecture. It built on a flat area 400 meters north of the Nanakoshiyama Kofun. The mound was originally thought to be an enpun (円墳)-style circular tumulus, but during the course of several archaeological excavations starting in 1987, it was found to be a very rare Octagonal Kofun (八角墳, hakkaku-fun). It measures 27.2 meters in diameter and six meters in height. The mound is constructed in four tiers, with only the lowest tier being octagonal, while the tiers from the second tier upwards are circular. Fukiishi revetment stones are visible on the surface of the mound, and cylindrical haniwa, human-shaped haniwa, and shield-shaped haniwa have been unearthed from the second tier.

The burial chamber is a double-chambered horizontal-entry stone chamber opening to the south. With a total length of 8.9 meters, it is the largest horizontal-chambered stone tomb in Fujioka City and is known as a unique stone tomb characterized by its stonework technique called "pattern stacking," primarily using quartzite boulders and schist rod-shaped stones stacked on the ends. By corbelling the side walls, the ceiling takes on a dome shape, and the plan of the burial chamber has a barrel-shaped form with a bulge in the center. The ceiling consists of two rounded sandstone stones, and the back wall is also made of sandstone. The entrance is supported by a pseudo-lintel made of chlorite schist slabs.The burial chamber proper has a length 4.7 meters, back wall width 1.84 meters, central width 2.41 meters, and front width 1.54 meters, with a 4.24 meter entry passage.

While the grave goods are not fully known, excavations have yielded Sue ware pottery and other artifacts, from which the construction period is estimated to be the latter half of the 6th century.

The Isezuka Kofun is located approximately two kilometers southeast of the Jōshin Dentetsu Nishi-Yamana Station

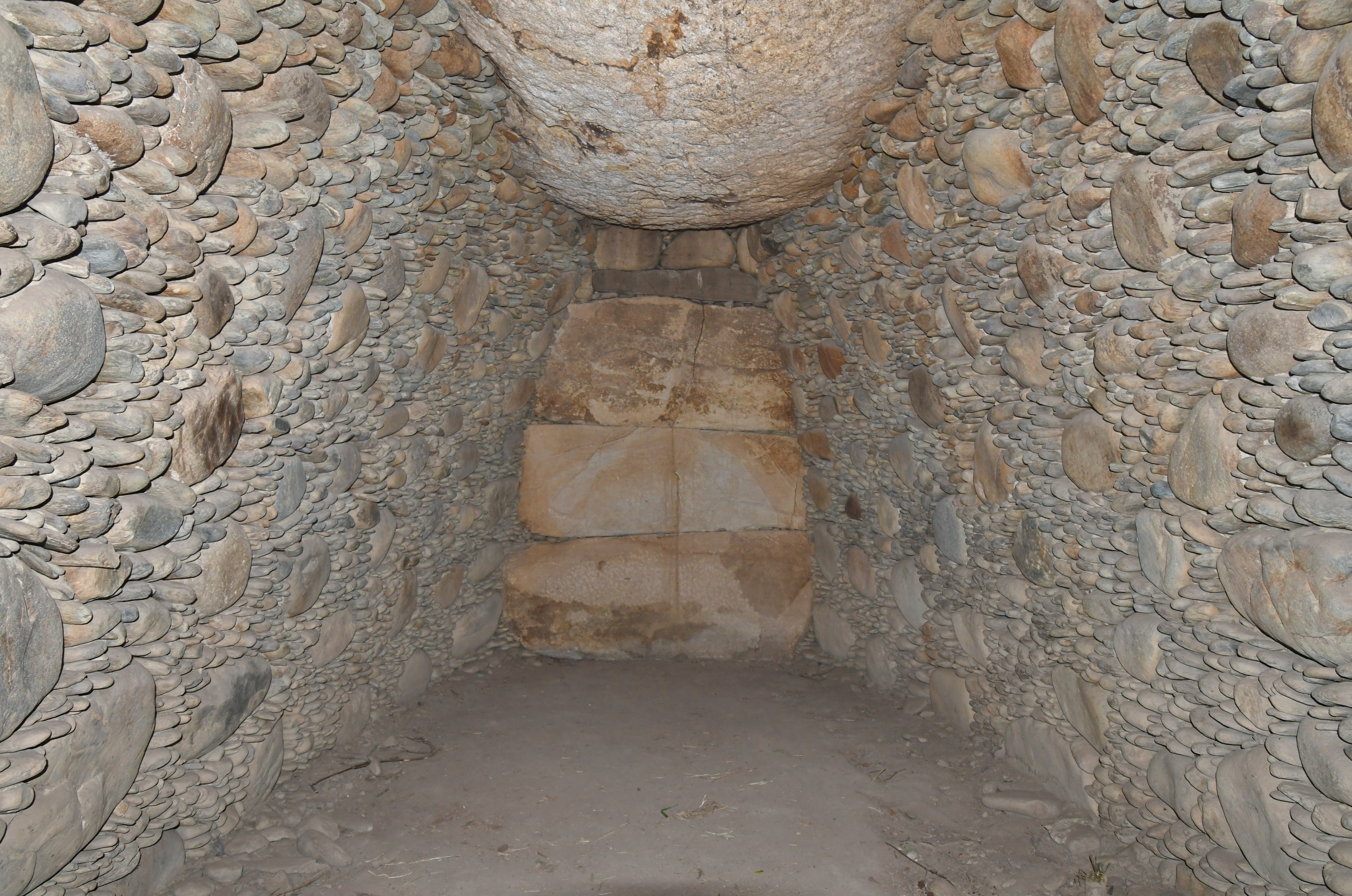
Burial Chamber (towards the back wall)

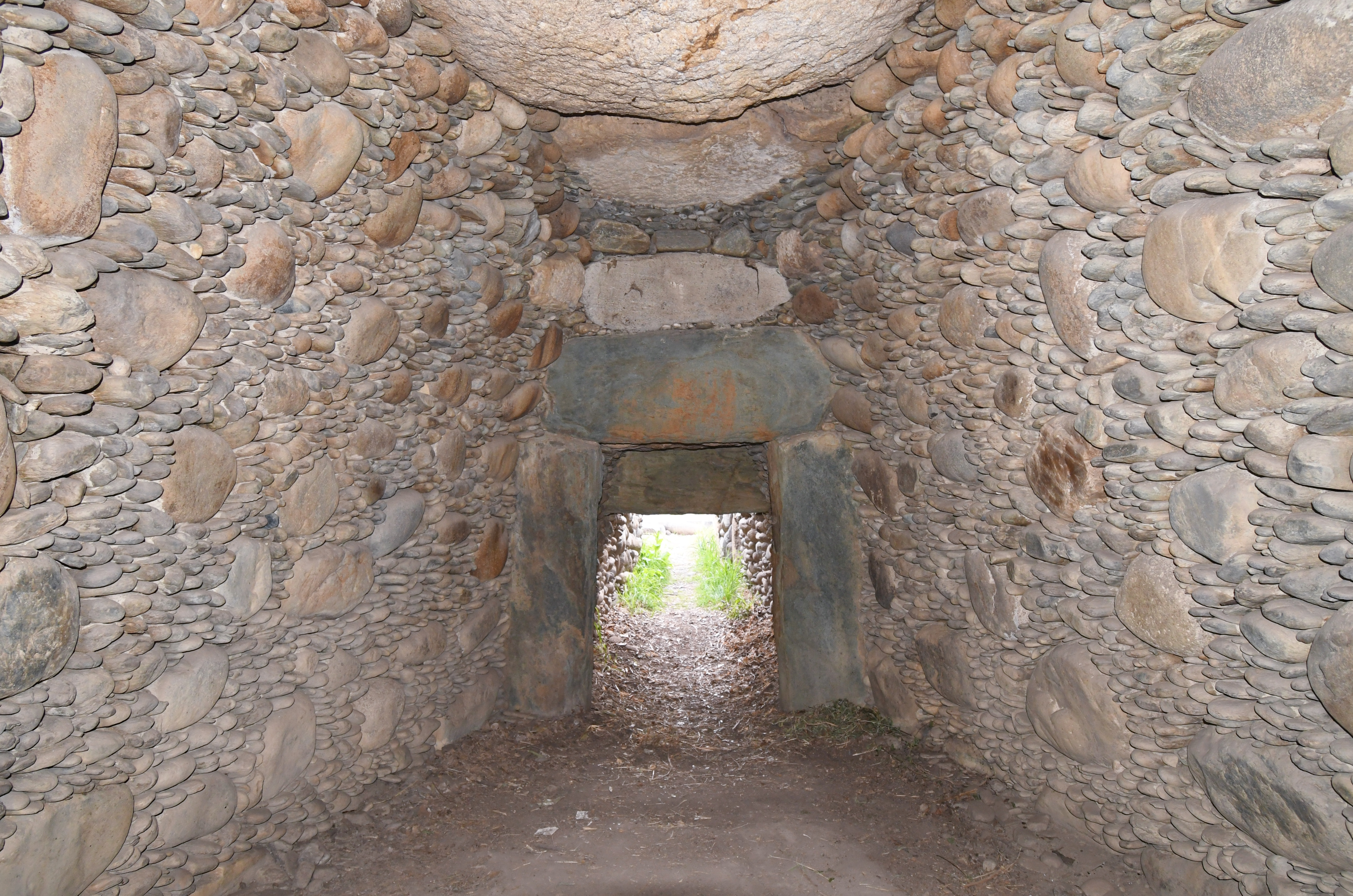
Burial Chamber (towards the opening)

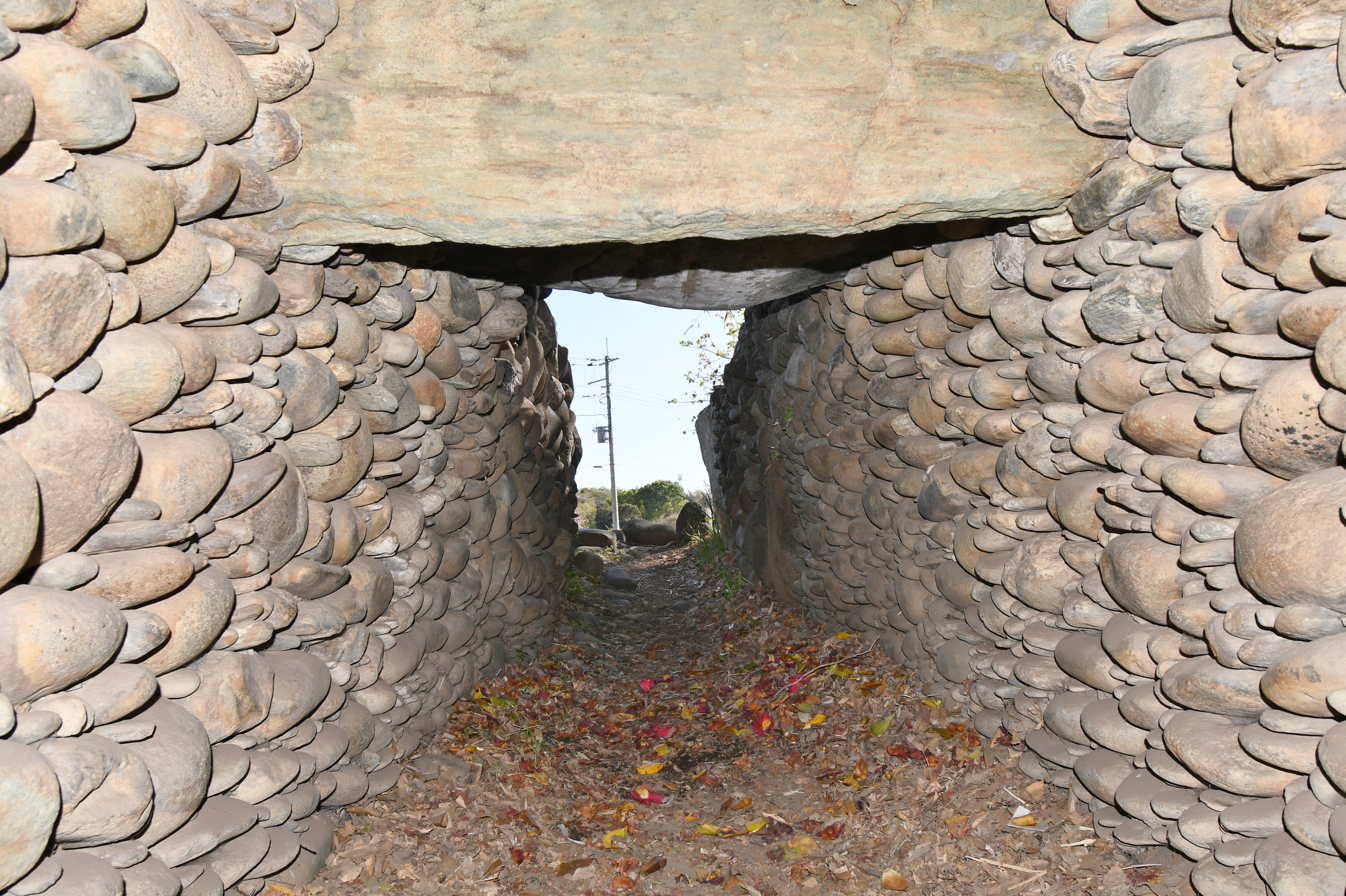
Entrance Passage (towards the entry)

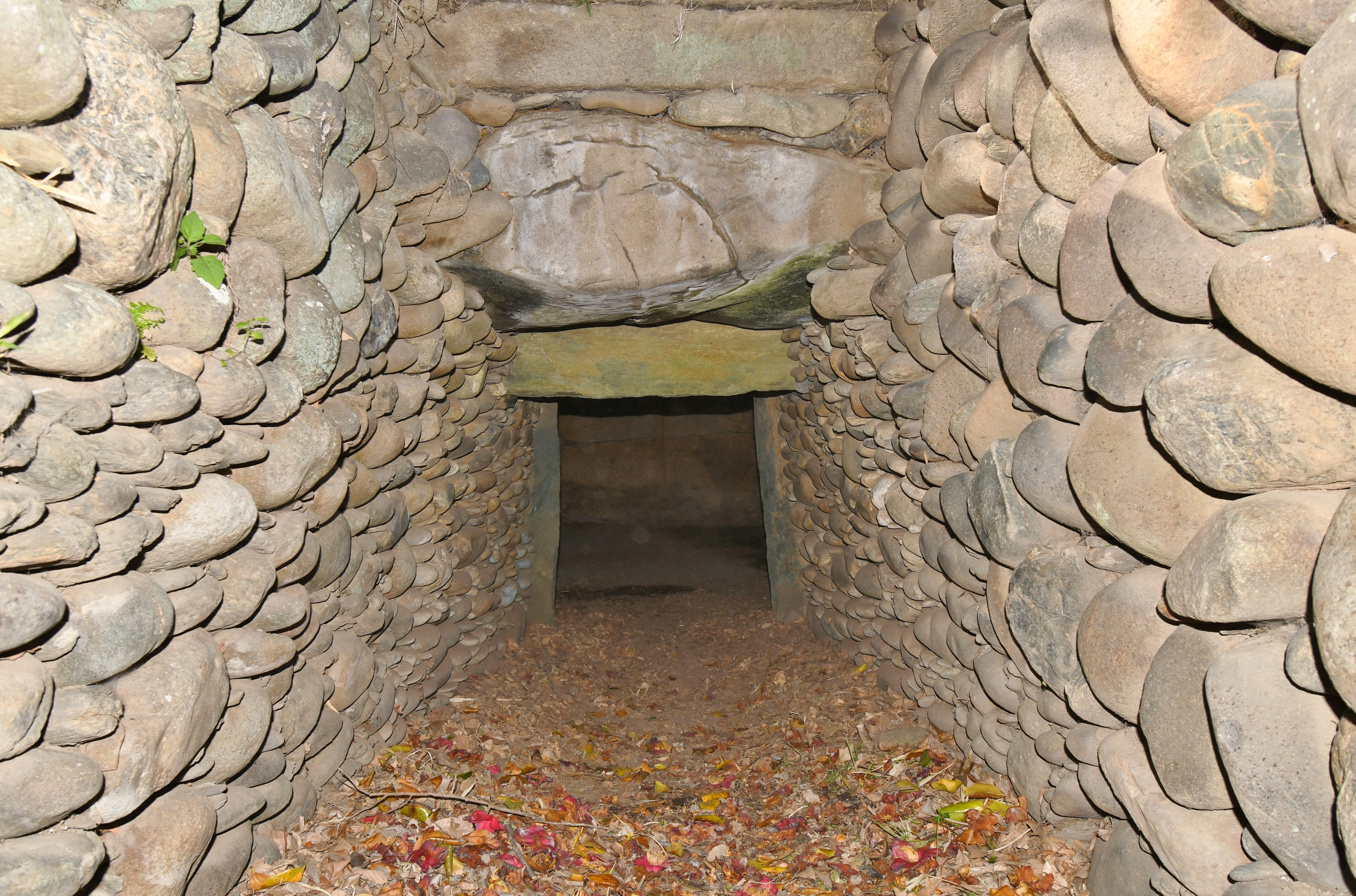
Entrance Passage (towards the burial chamber)

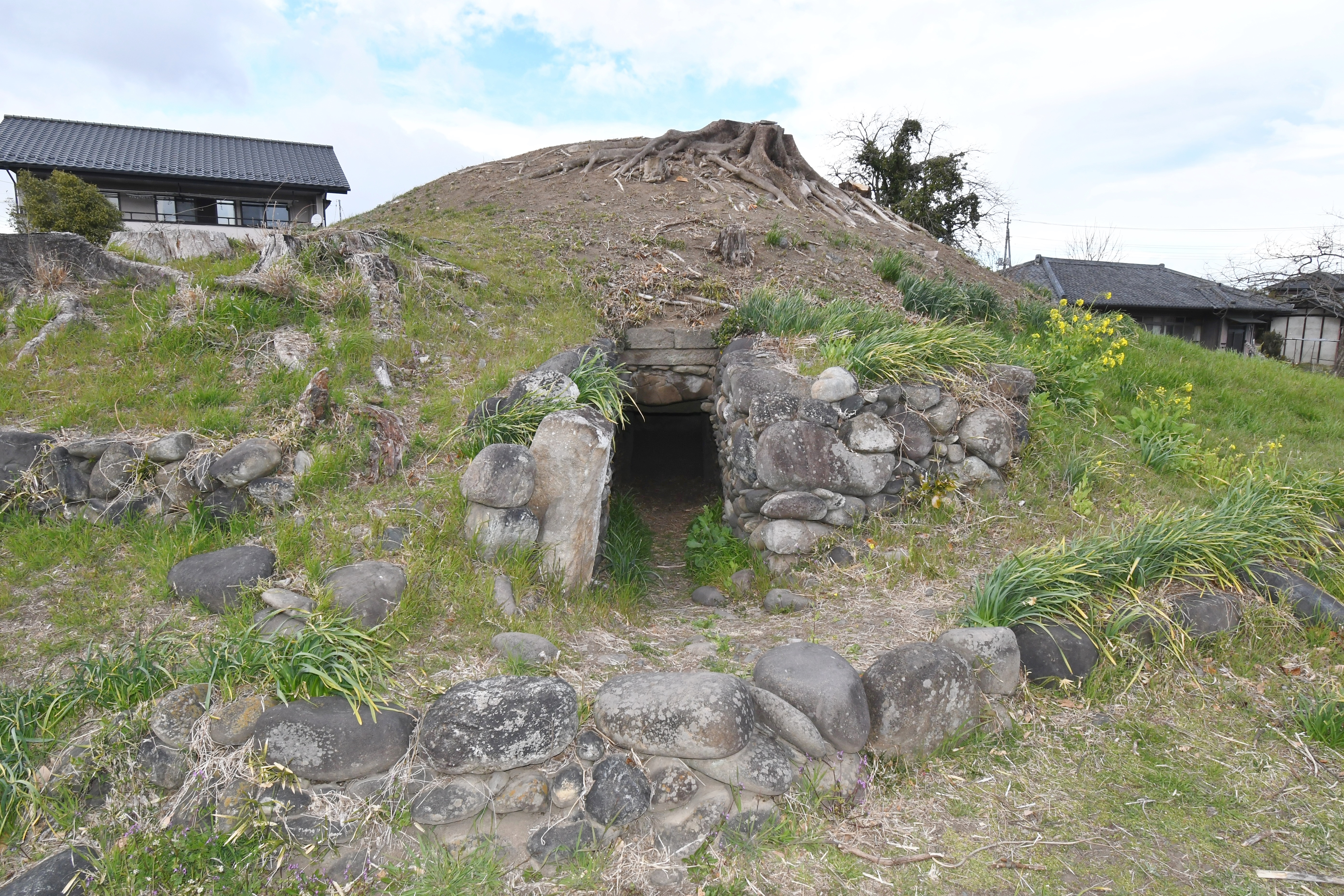
Entry

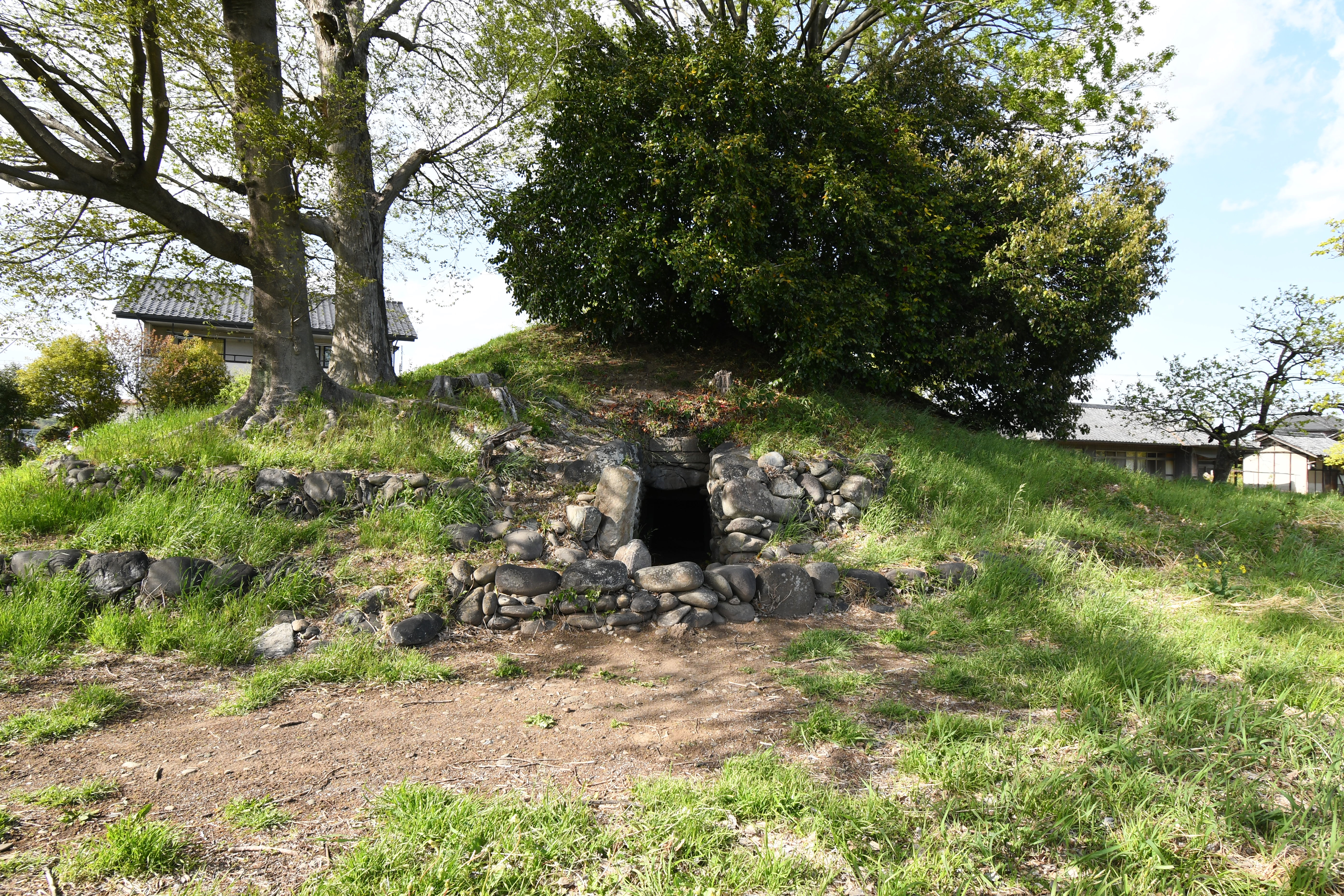
Overview

== See also ==
- List of Historic Sites of Japan (Gunma)
