= Hirai District No.1 Kofun =

Kofun period burial mound in Gunma, Japan

- 平井地区1号墳 (Japanese)
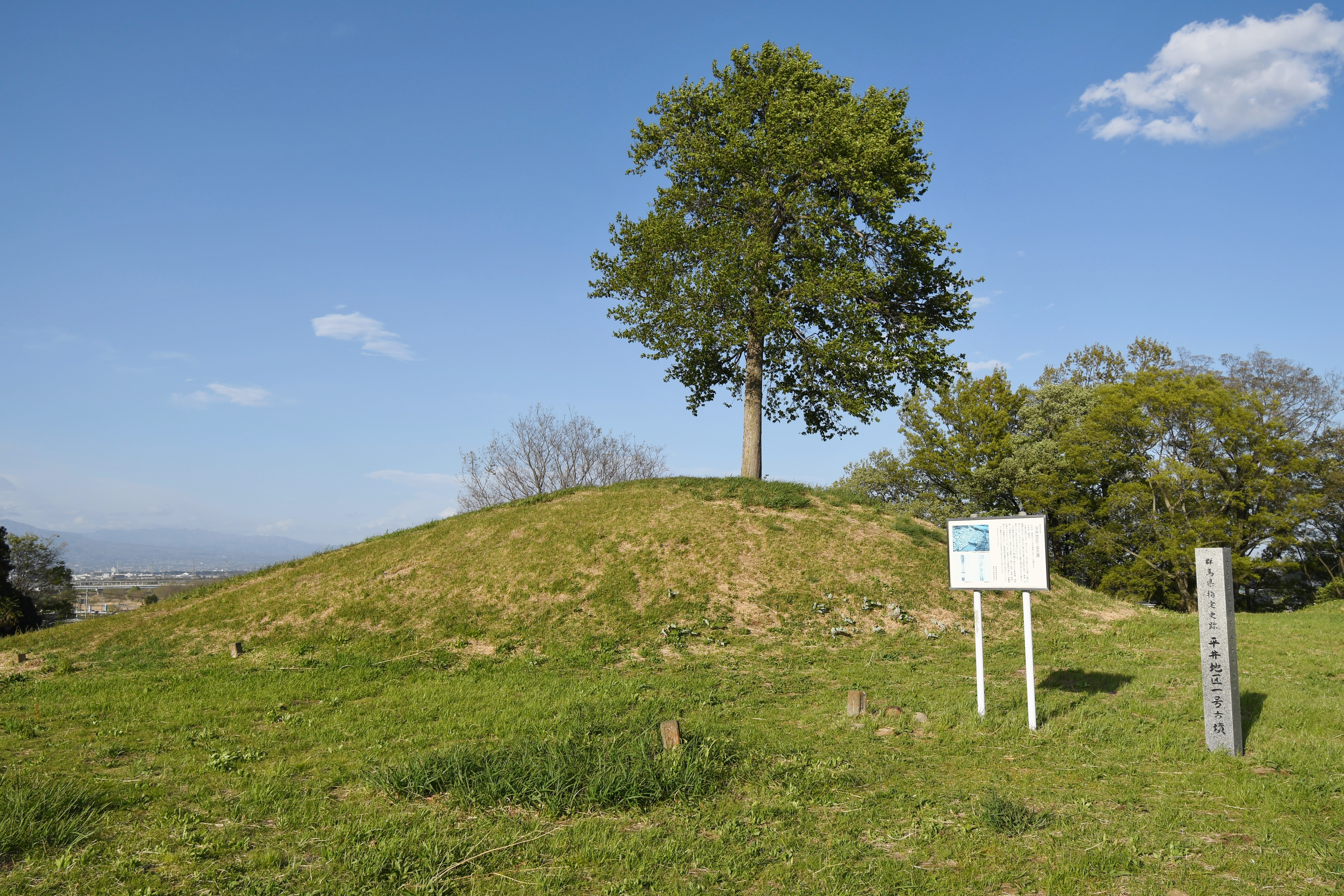
- Hirai District No.1 Kofun

- Hirai District No.1 Kofun Hirai District No.1 Kofun (Japan)
- 36°15′35.15″N 139°2′30.35″E
- Type: Kofun
- Periods: Kofun period
- Location: Mitsugi-cho, Fujioka, Gunma
- Region: Kantō region

History
- Built: late 6th century

Site notes
- Public access: Yes (park)
- National Important Cultural Property Gunma Prefecture Historic Site

The Hirai District No.1 Kofun (平井地区1号墳) is a Kofun period burial mound, located in the Mitsugi neighborhood of the city of Fujioka, Gunma in the Kantō region of Japan. The tumulus was designated a Gunma Prefecture Historic Site in 1992.. It is one of the burial mounds that make up the Shiraishi Kofun cluster. The artifacts recovered from the site are collectively designated as a National Important Cultural Property.

== Overview ==
The Hirai District No.1 Kofun is an enpun (円墳)-style circular tumulus, constructed on the northern end of a tongue-shaped river terrace on the left bank of the Ayukawa River in southern Gunma Prefecture. The Ōjizuka Kofun is adjacent to the south. The mound is 30 meters in diameter and 3.5 meters high. It was constructed in two tiers with a base platform, with its surface protected by fukiishi revetment stones. Cylindrical and figurative haniwa (including house, quiver, sword, hat, and arm guard shaped haniwa) have been unearthed in archaeological excavations conducted in 1991 and 2013-2014. Furthermore, ritual structures with pebbles laid on the ground have been found in two locations: in front of the stone chamber and on the summit of the mound. Sue ware and Haji ware were placed in front of the burial chamber, and crushed large Sue ware jars were stacked on top of each other on the summit.

The burial facility is a double-chambered horizontal-entry stone chamber opening to the north. It has a total length of 6.8 meters, with the chamber proper trapezoidal, measuring 3.65 by 2.1 meters at the back wall and 1.25 meter at the entrance. The passageway is 3.15 meters long and 0.85 meters wide. The burial chamber is made of cut tuff blocks. Numerous grave goods have been unearthed from inside the chamber, with the gold and silver-decorated single-phoenix ring-pommel sword and the silver-inlaid round-pommel sword being particularly noteworthy. Other items included gold rings, an iron knife, and horse fittings. The construction period is estimated to be around the latter half of the 6th century, during the late Kofun period (roughly the same period as the Ōjizuka Kofun).

The burial mound area was designated a Gunma Prefecture Historic Site in 1993 and the site is open to the public within the Kenokuni Shiraishi Hill Park. Artifacts from the kofun are stored and displayed at the Fujioka Historical Museum.

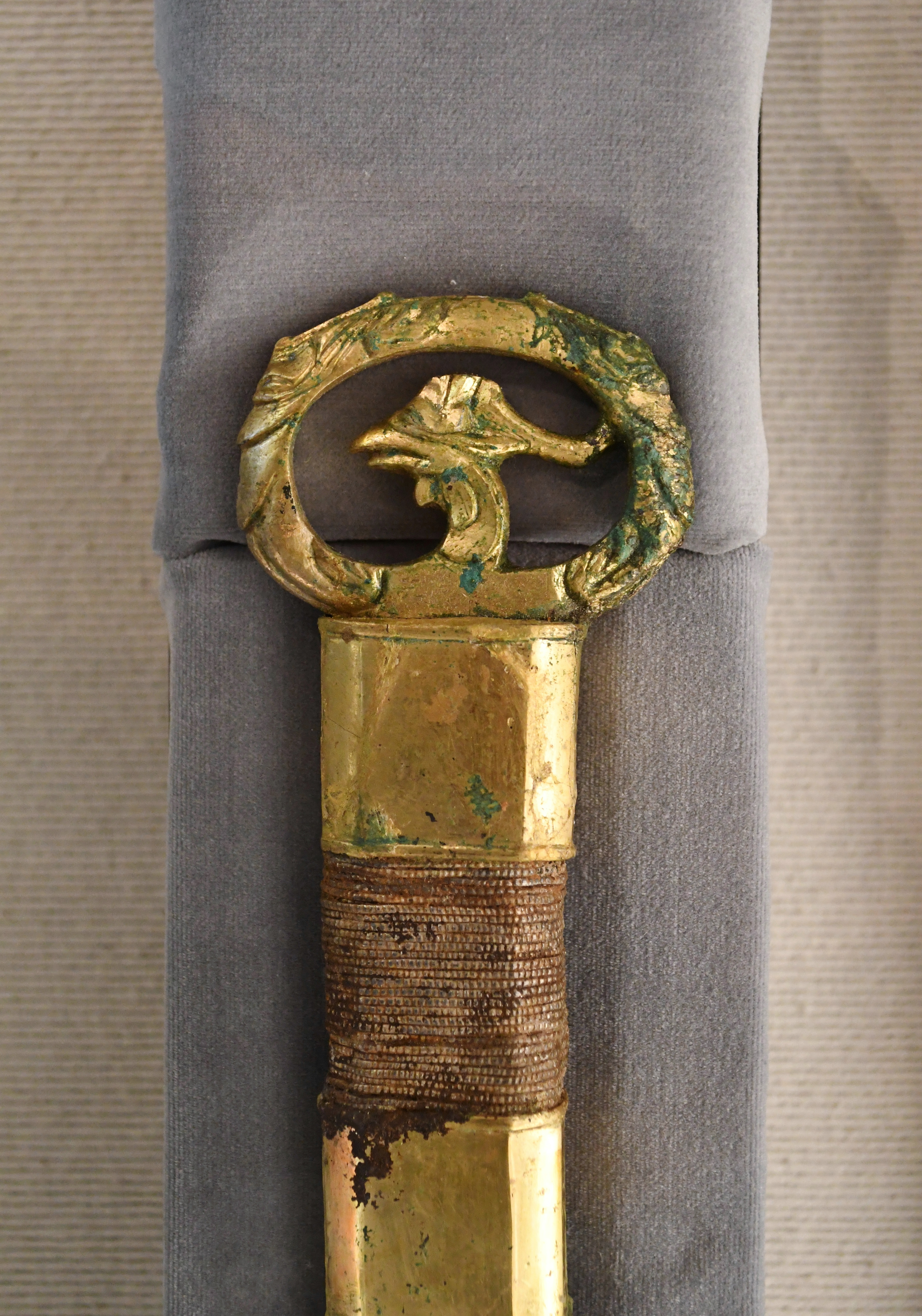
Gold and Silver Ornamented Single Phoenix Ring-Pommel Sword (Ring-Pommel)

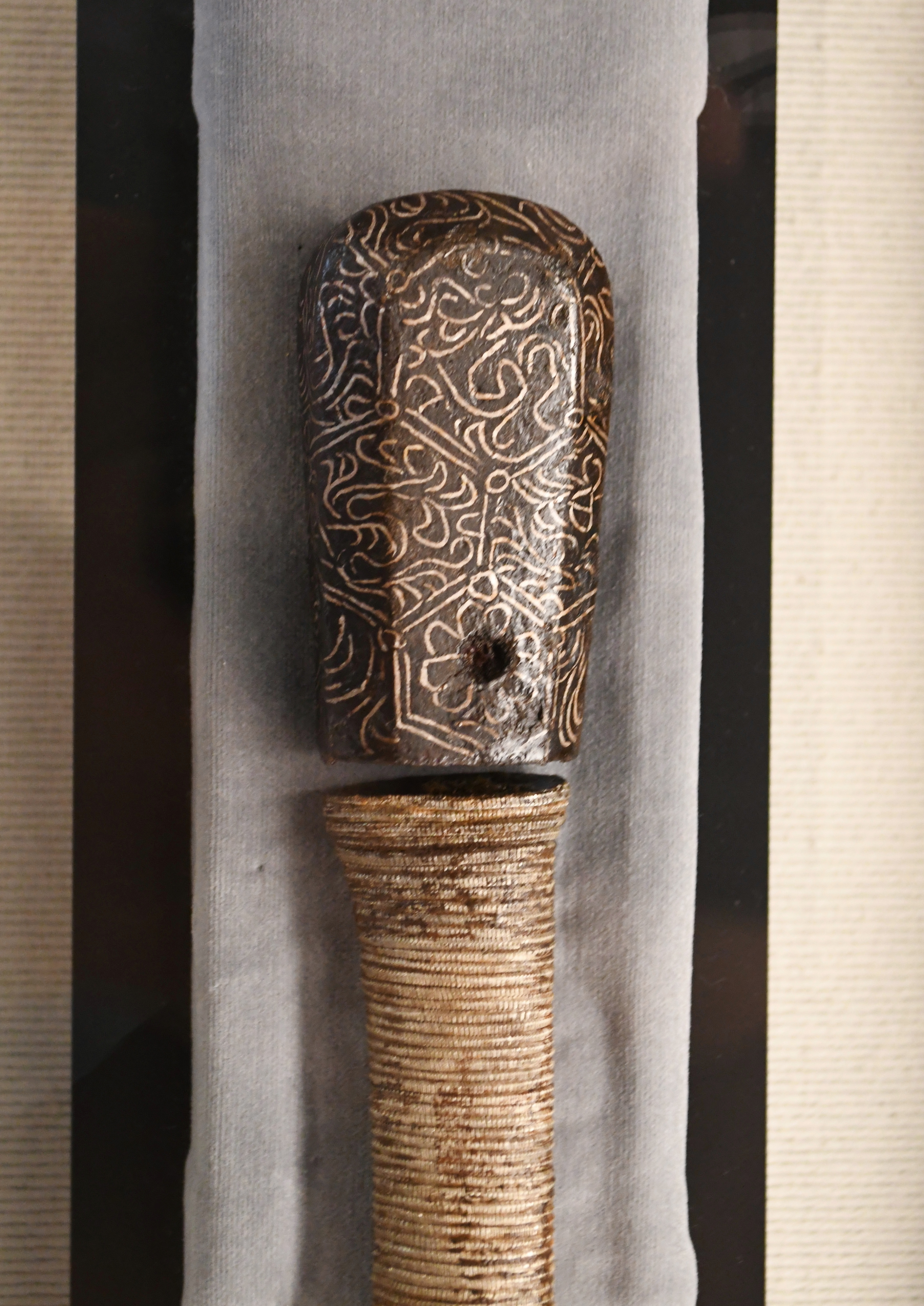
Silver Inlaid Round-Pommel Sword (Round-Pommel)

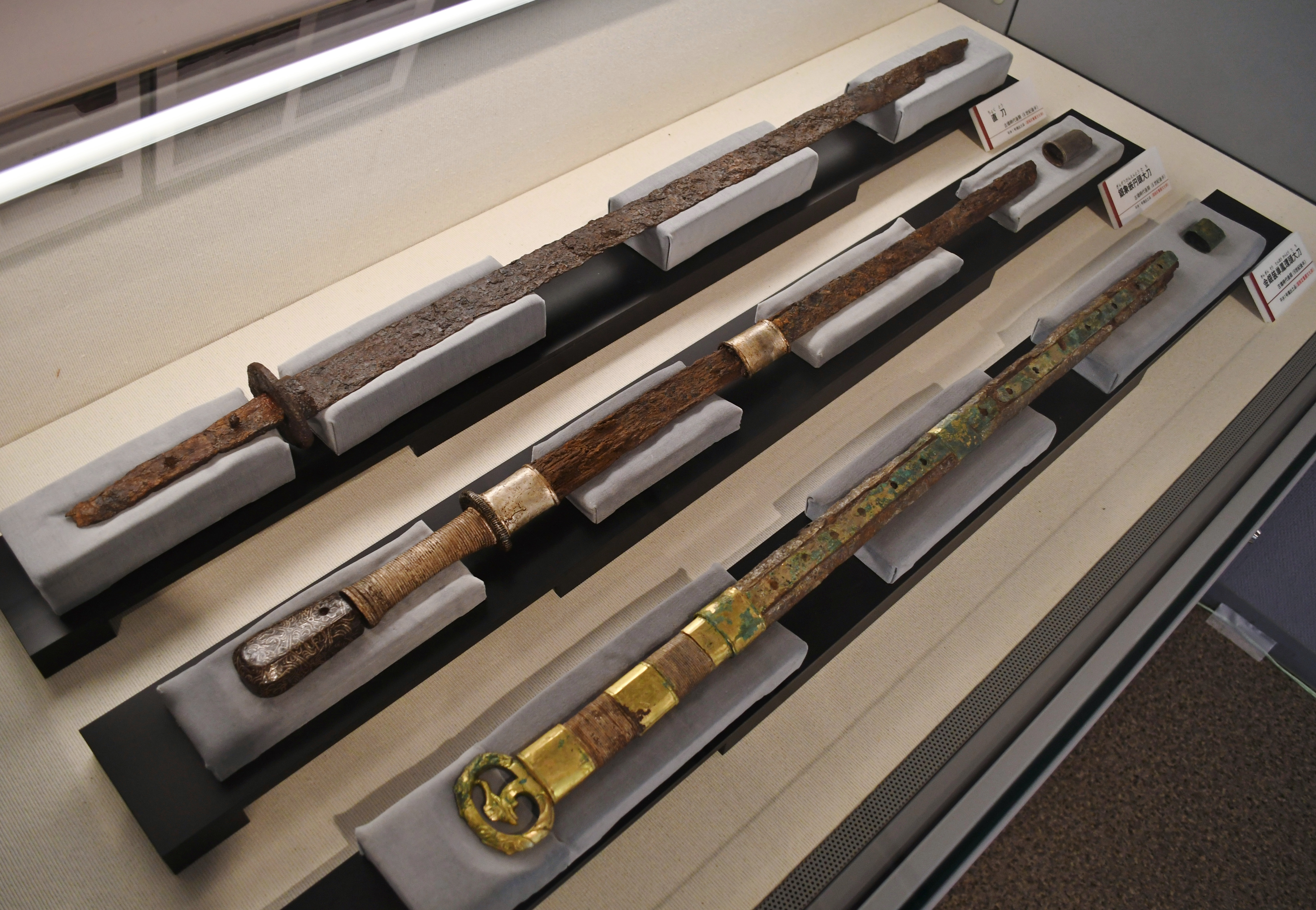
Swords recovered from the Hirai District

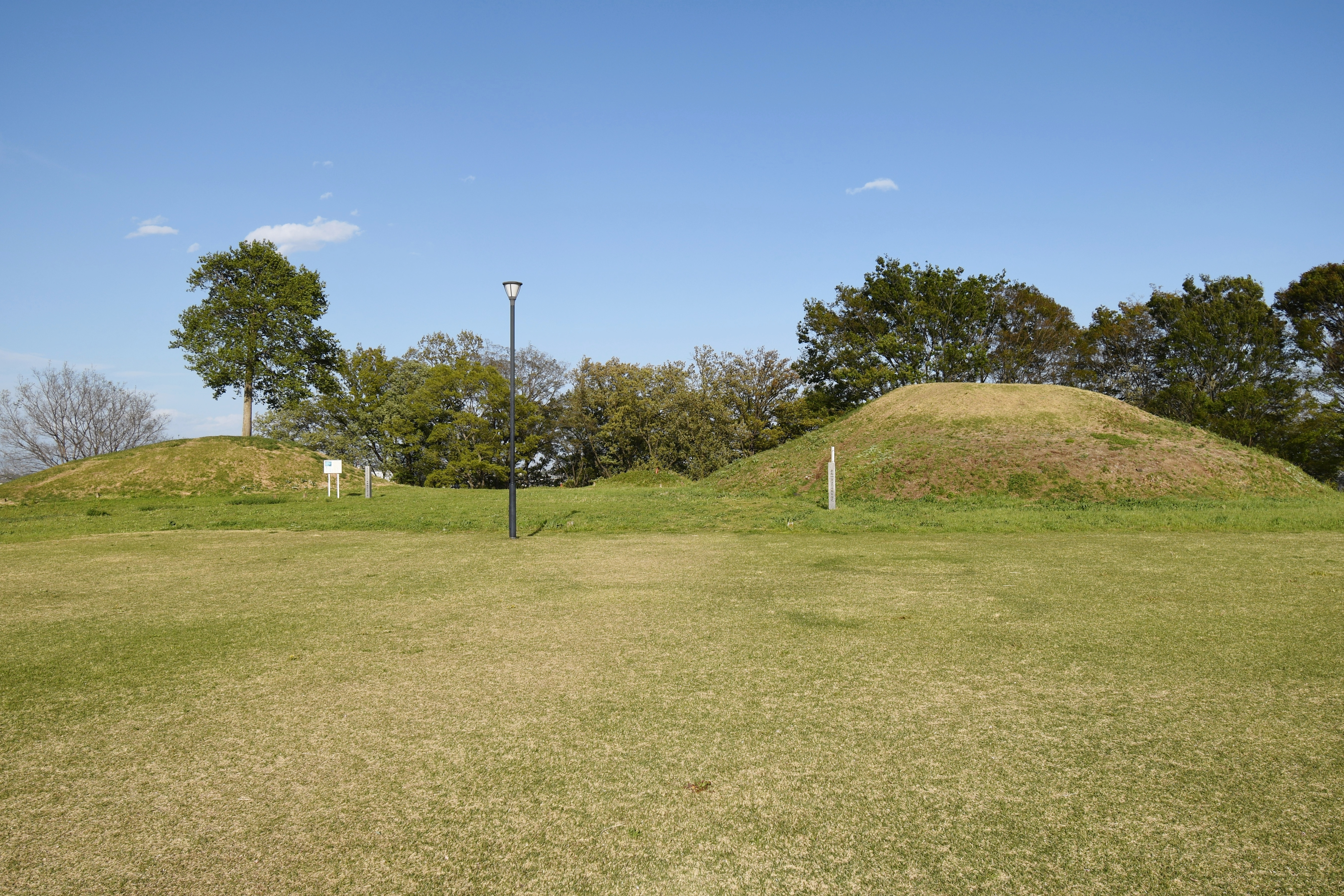
To the left is Hirai District No.1 Tumulus No. 1, and to the right is Ōjizuka Tumulus.

== See also ==
- List of Historic Sites of Japan (Gunma)
