= Ōjizuka Kofun (Fujioka) =

Kofun period burial mound in Gunma, Japan

- 皇子塚古墳 (Japanese)
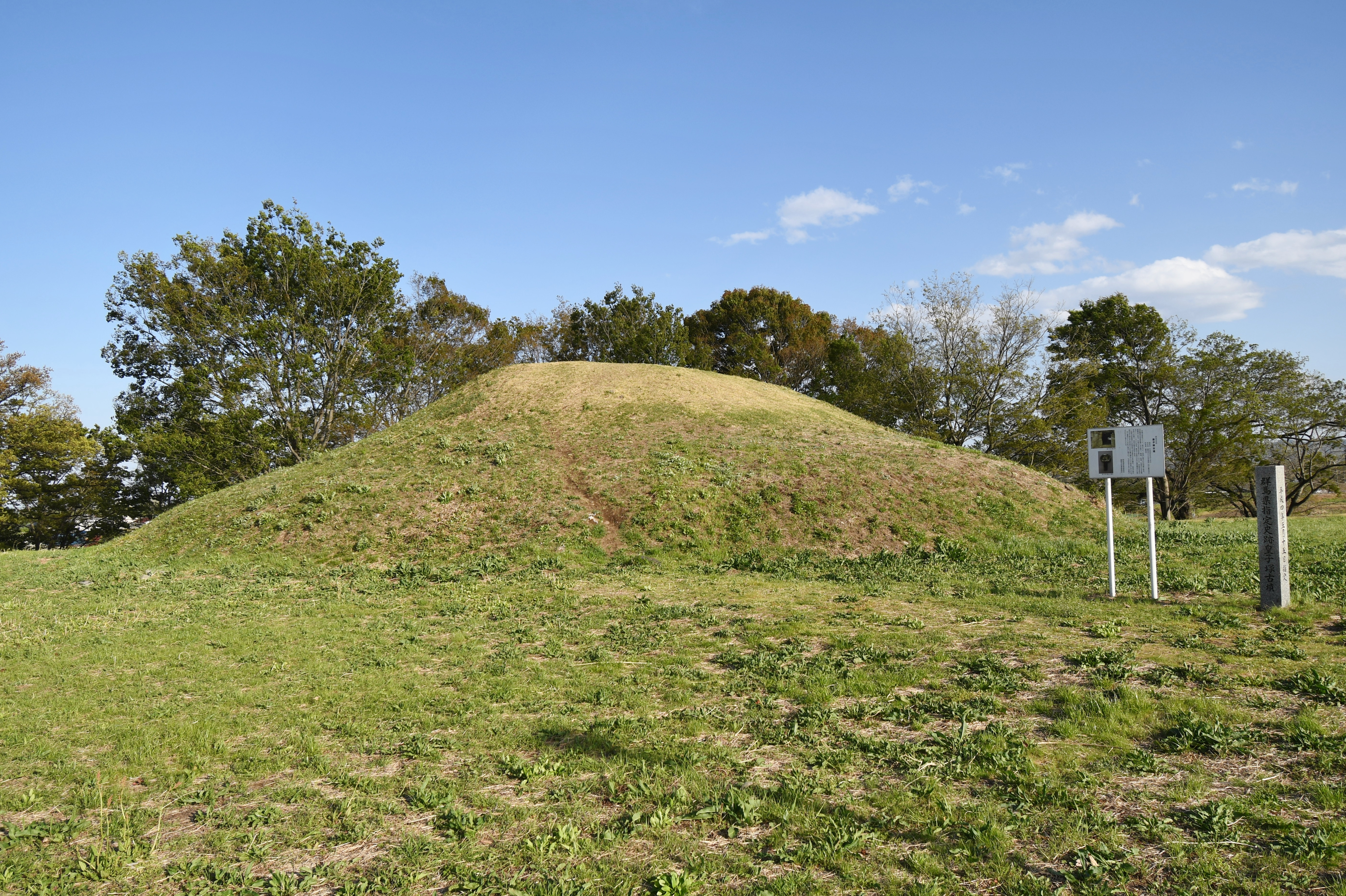
- Ōjizuka Kofun

- Ōjizuka Kofun Ōjizuka Kofun (Fujioka) (Japan)
- 36°15′33.72″N 139°2′30.10″E
- Type: Kofun
- Periods: Kofun period
- Location: Mitsuki-cho, Fujioka, Gunma
- Region: Kantō region

History
- Built: late 6th century

Site notes
- Public access: Yes (park, entry possible)
- Gunma Prefecture Historic Site

The Ōjizuka Kofun (皇子塚古墳) is a Kofun period burial mound, located in the Mitsuki neighborhood of the city of Fujioka, Gunma in the Kantō region of Japan. The tumulus was designated a Gunma Prefecture Historic Site in 1992.. It is one of the burial mounds that make up the Shiraishi Kofun cluster.

== Overview ==
The Ōjizuka Kofun an enpun (円墳)-style circular tumulus, constructed on the eastern end of a tongue-shaped river terrace on the left bank of the Ayukawa River in southern Gunma Prefecture. The Hirai District No.1 Kofun is adjacent to the north. The mound is 30 to 31 meters in diameter and six meters high. It was constructed in four tiers, with its surface protected by fukiishi revetment stones. Cylindrical and figurative haniwa (including human, horse, shield, quiver, sword, shadow, and arm guard shaped haniwa) have been unearthed in archaeological excavations conducted in 1988 and 2013-2014.

The burial facility is a double-chambered horizontal-entry stone burial chamber opening to the southeast. It consists of a main chamber and an antechamber with a total length of 8.33 meters. The main chamber is 3.52 by 2.1 meters with a height of 1.6 meters and the antechamber has a length of 1.85 meters. These are connected with the entrance by a 2.64 meter passage.The main chamber was constructed using a cut tuff blocks, while the antechamber and entrance passage were constructed using irregularly shaped river stones.Three tuff partition stones are located in the center of the burial chamber to divide the front and back, and tuff blocks are placed between the entrance and the chamber.

Grave goods found in the forecourt included Sue ware pottery (storage bottles and flat bottles) and shield-shaped haniwa. From inside the burial chamber, a gilded bronze single-dragon ring-pommel sword hilt, two bow fittings, iron arrowheads, earrings, three small beads, and horse trappings have been found. These artifacts date the construction to around the latter half of the 6th century, during the late Kofun period. Secondary burials up to the first half of the 7th century have been confirmed .

Currently, the tumulus is within the Kenokuni Shiraishi Hill Park. Artifacts from the kofun are stored and displayed at the Fujioka Historical Museum.

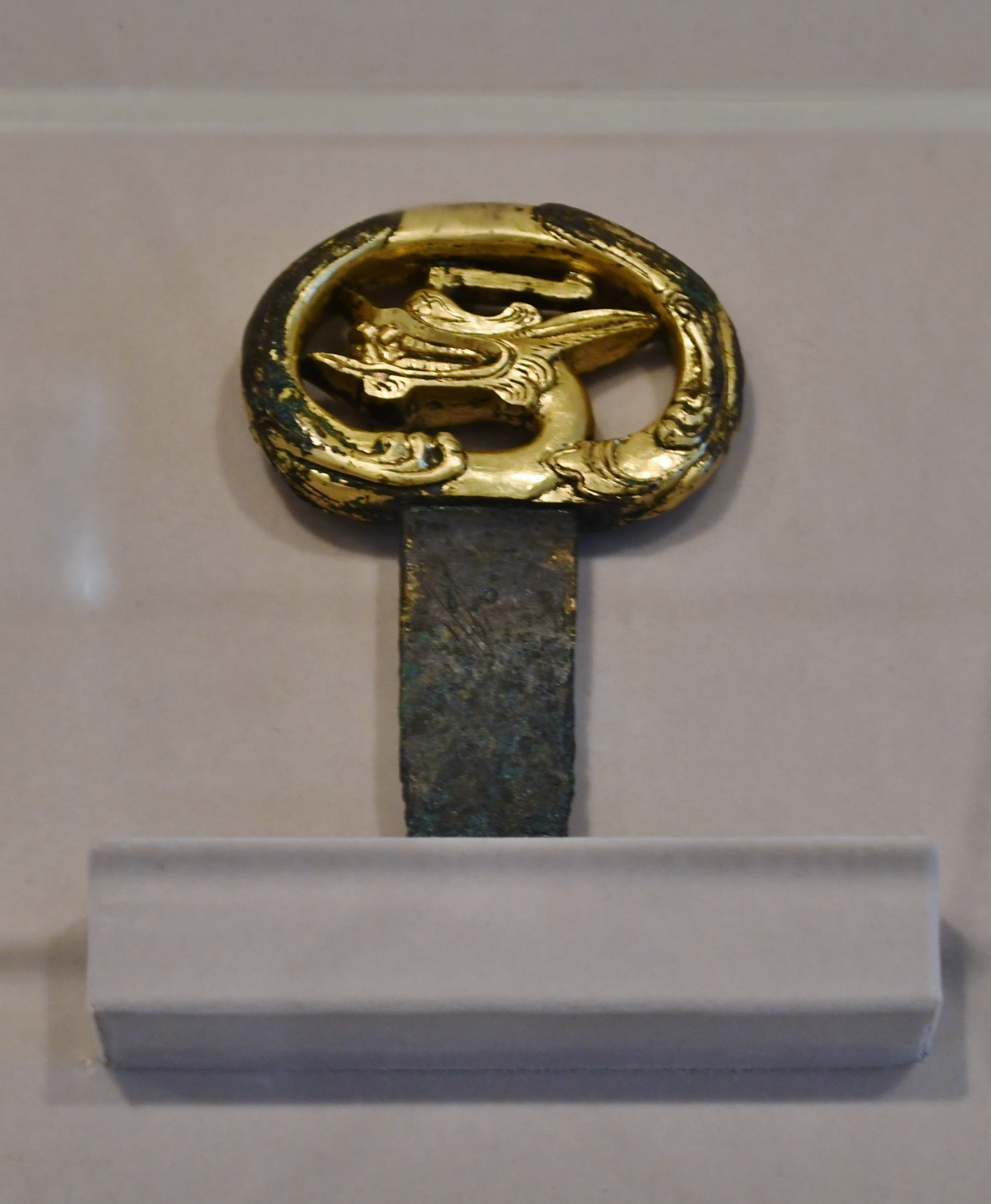
単Single-dragon ring-headed sword hilt
On display at Fujioka History Museum.

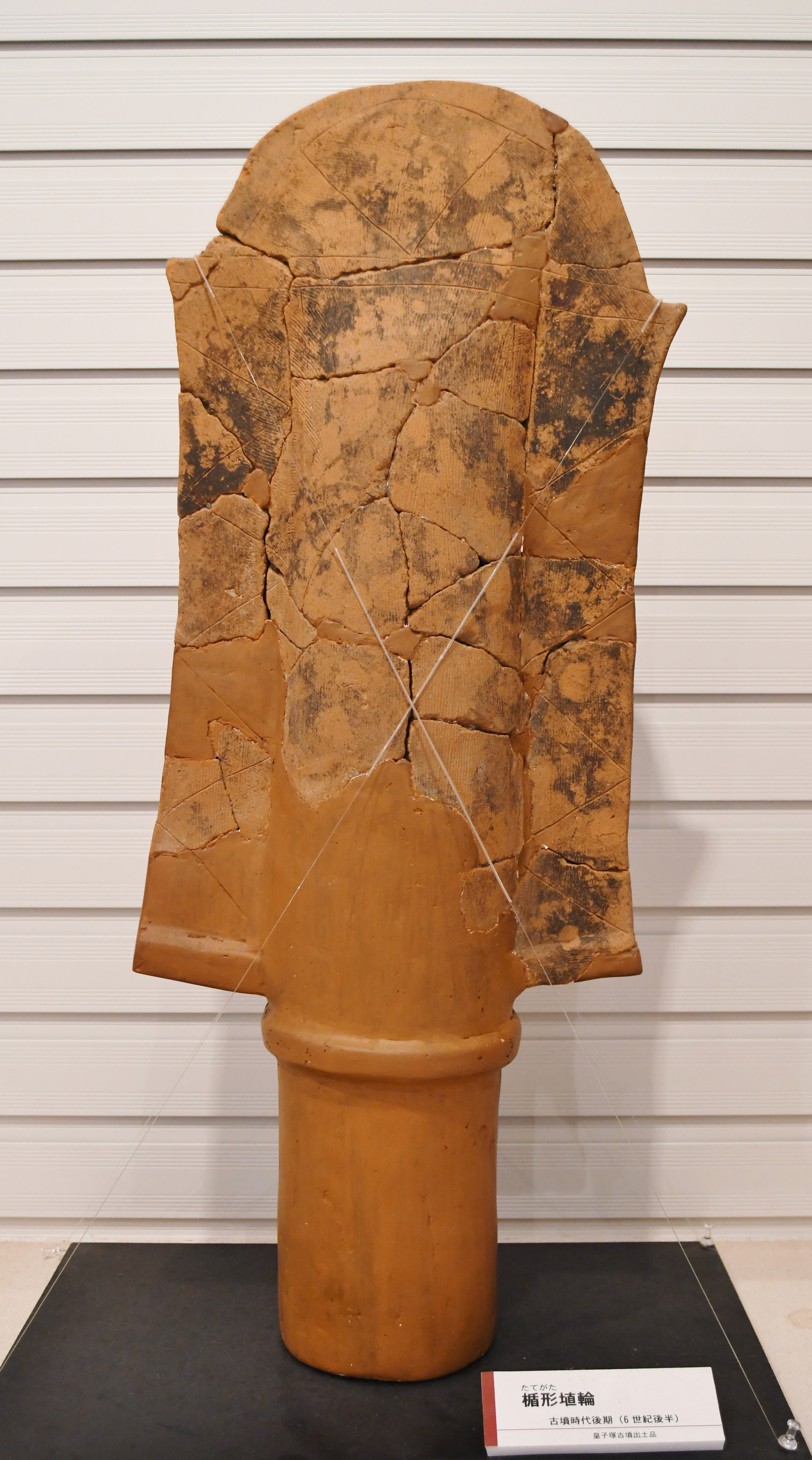
Shield-shaped Haniwa
On display at Fujioka History Museum.

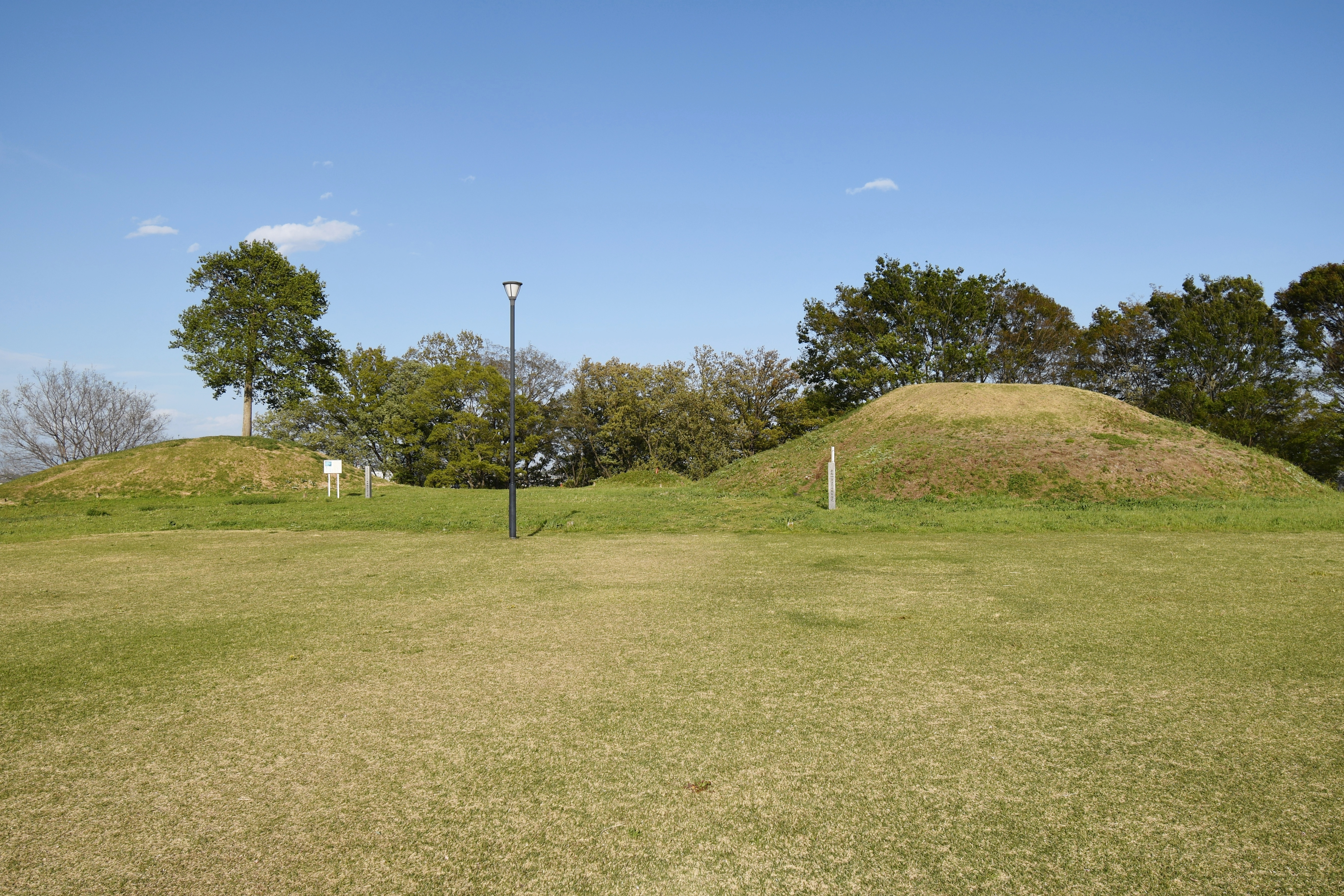
To the left is Hirai District Tumulus No. 1, and to the right is Ōjizuka Tumulus.

== See also ==
- List of Historic Sites of Japan (Gunma)
