= Yuzurihara Stone Age Residence Site =

Archaeological site in Fujioka, Japan

- 譲原石器時代住居跡 (Japanese)
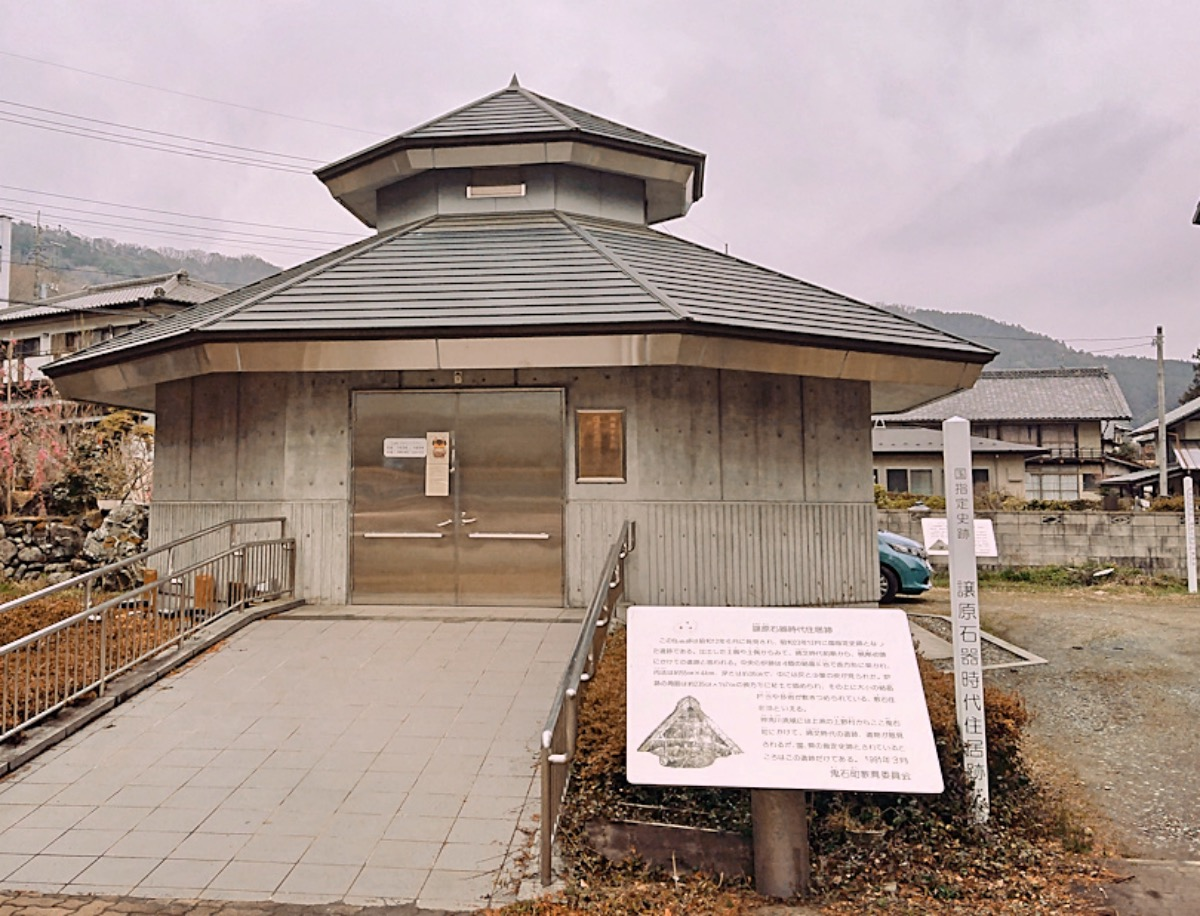
- Yuzurihara Stone Age Residence Site

- Yuzurihara Stone Age Residence Site ruins Yuzurihara Stone Age Residence Site (Japan)
- 36°08′28″N 139°02′25″E
- Type: settlement
- Periods: Jōmon period
- Location: Fujioka, Gunma, Japan
- Region: Kantō region

Site notes
- Public access: Yes

The Yuzurihara Stone Age Residence Site (譲原石器時代住居跡, Yuzurihara sekki-jidai jūkyo ato) is an archaeological site with the ruins of a Jōmon period settlement, located in what is now part of the city of Fujioka, Gunma Prefecture in the northern Kantō region of Japan. The site was designated a National Historic Site of Japan in 1948.

== Overview ==
The site is located near the border of Gunma Prefecture with Saitama Prefecture on a river terrace of the Kanna River where the river makes a bend from east to north. It is within the grounds of the Mihara Elementary School Yuzurihara Branch School.

Some artifacts were discovered in the vicinity in 1933 and the actual site in 1937, with excavation taking place in 1946. The ruins were found to be a rectangular residence foundation consisting of flagstones, with approximate dimensions of 4.3 by 3.6 meters. In the center was a stone-lined rectangular hearth made from schist. Various stone tools, stone axes and stone jewelry along with clay figurines and Jōmon pottery were also found. These artifacts date the site to the early through late Jōmon period. Although a relatively small dwelling trace, when discovered it was considered a rare example of a building with a stone floor from this period and received National Historic Site designation. The site is now protected by a small museum.

== See also ==
- List of Historic Sites of Japan (Gunma)
