= Fuku Amagawa =

Japanese ramen chef (born 1923)

- 天川ふく
- Born: 1923 (age 102–103); Fujioka City
- Occupation: Ramen chef

Fuku Amagawa (born 1923) is a Japanese ramen chef. She has run her family restaurant, Ginkatei, since 1965. She gained widespread media attention for continuing to cook at the restaurant herself, which she is still doing as of 2026 at the age of 103. She is one of the world's oldest ramen chefs.

== Biography ==
Amagawa was born in 1923 in what is now Fujioka City, and had three younger siblings, who she grew up caring for. She attended a girls' school and planned to become a housewife, but most young men were at war, so she instead became an office worker at a bus company.

She was passionate about movies and would travel to watch them, and so in 1949, she had an arranged marriage to a man whose family ran the local movie theater. She helped run the theater through the 1950s and early 1960s. However, soon color television reduced the popularity of movie theaters.

In 1964 she trained in cooking at Takasaki, where she learned how to make ramen and fried rice. She and her husband, a talented cook, then opened a restaurant, Ginkatei, in the movie theater. They also catered events at the town hall. A few years later, a fire destroyed the theater section, and they focused on the restaurant.

Her husband died in 2003, and she considered closing the restaurant, but she ultimately decided to keep the restaurant open, supported by her children. She began gaining attention at the age of 100 for continuing to work at her restaurant, furthered by Takuya Kimura, who she was a longtime fan of, bringing his television show to her restaurant. She soon had to restrict entry due to crowds. She also placed a life-sized cutout of herself in front of her restaurant, which many people come to see and take photos in front of. Lines form before the restaurant opens.

As of 2025, she worked at her restaurant six days a week, one hour a day, cooking ramen. By 2026, she had reduced that to five days a week. She is one of the world's oldest active ramen chefs. Her signature dish is a ramen with chicken broth and soy sauce. She is known to do squats while boiling ramen noodles, and began strength training at 101.
