= Nanakoshiyama Kofun =

Japanese historical site

Nanakoshiyama kofun
- 七輿山古墳 (Japanese)
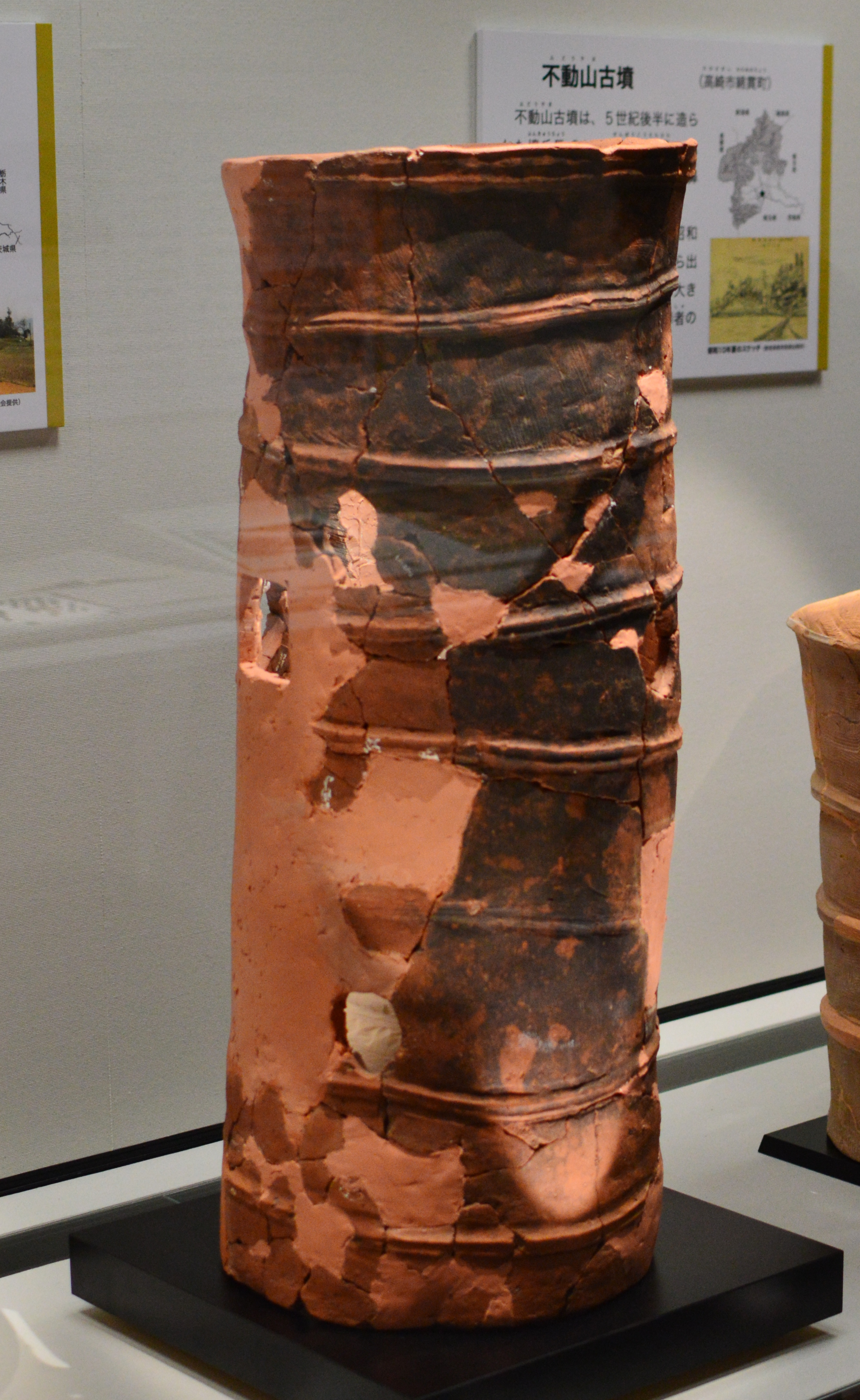
- Haniwa found at the Nanakoshiyama Kofun now at the Gunma Prefectural Museum of History

- Nanakoshiyama kofun Nanakoshiyama Kofun (Japan)
- 36°15′42″N 139°02′22″E
- Type: kofun
- Periods: Kofun period
- Location: Fujioka, Gunma, Japan
- Region: Kantō region

Site notes
- Public access: Yes (no public facilities)

Nanakoshiyama Kofun (七輿山古墳) is a keyhole-shaped (zempō-kōen fun (前方後円墳)) Kofun period burial mound located in what is now the Kamiochiai neighborhood of the city of Fujioka, Gunma Prefecture in the northern Kantō region of Japan. The site was designated a National Historic Site of Japan in 1927, an expanded in 1996.

== Overview ==
The Nanakoshiyama Kofun is located on the southwest side of the confluence of the Kabura River and the Ayu River, and is the largest in Gunma Prefecture.

- Overall length: 145 meters
- Posterior circle: 87 meter diameter by 16 meter high
- Anterior width: 106 meters by 16 meters high

The tumulus is built in three tiers and is surrounded by three concentric moats. It was once covered in fukiishi and numerous fragments of haniwa have been found. These haniwa are in many varieties, including cylindrical, cone-shaped, and in the form of people, horses, houses and shields. The largest of the cylindrical haniwa has a diameter of 50 cm and a height of 1.1 meters. From the style of these haniwa, it is estimated that the tomb dates from the middle of the 6th century.

The tumulus has not been excavated, and the burial chamber has not been found. A survey using Ground-penetrating radar conducted in 2017 revealed a stone-lined chamber. The tumulus has been planted with sakura trees and is a popular flower-viewing destination in spring.

The tumulus is located approximately a 20-minute walk from Nishi-Yamana Station on the Jōshin Railway.

== See also ==
- List of Historic Sites of Japan (Gunma)
