= Shinsui Dam =

Dam in Gunma Prefecture, Japan

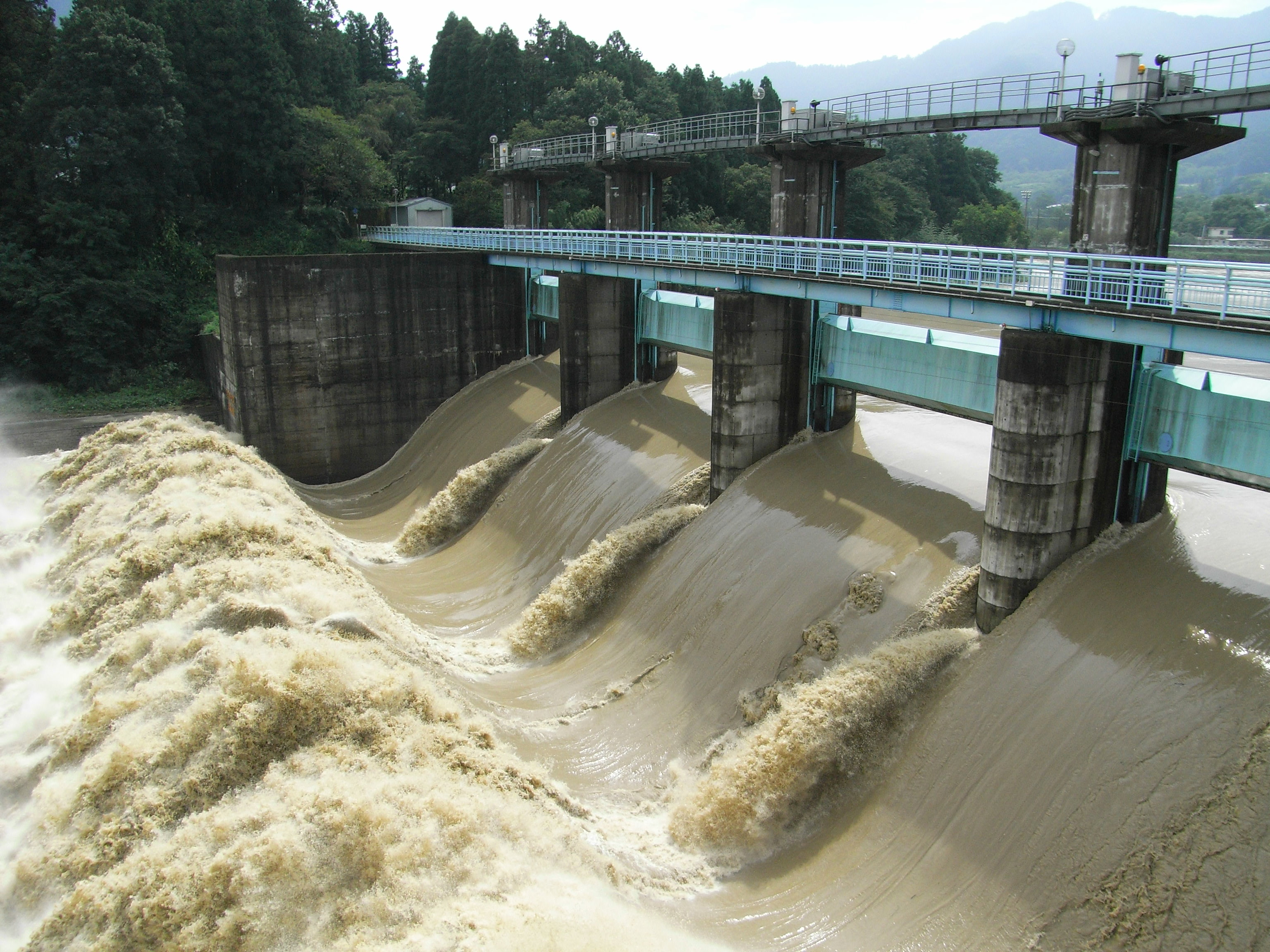
- Interactive map of Shinsui Dam
- Location: Gunma Prefecture, Japan.
- Coordinates: 36.152326°N 139.04902°E
- Construction began: 1965
- Opening date: 1968

Dam and spillways
- Type of dam: Gravity
- Impounds: Kanna River
- Height: 20.5 m (67 ft)
- Length: 130.5 m (428 ft)

Reservoir
- Total capacity: 502,000 m^{3} (17,700,000 cu ft)
- Catchment area: 338.7 km^{2} (130.8 sq mi)
- Surface area: 8 hectares

Shinsui Dam is a dam in the Gunma Prefecture of Japan, completed in 1968.
