= Shimokubo Dam =

Dam in Gunma Prefecture, Japan

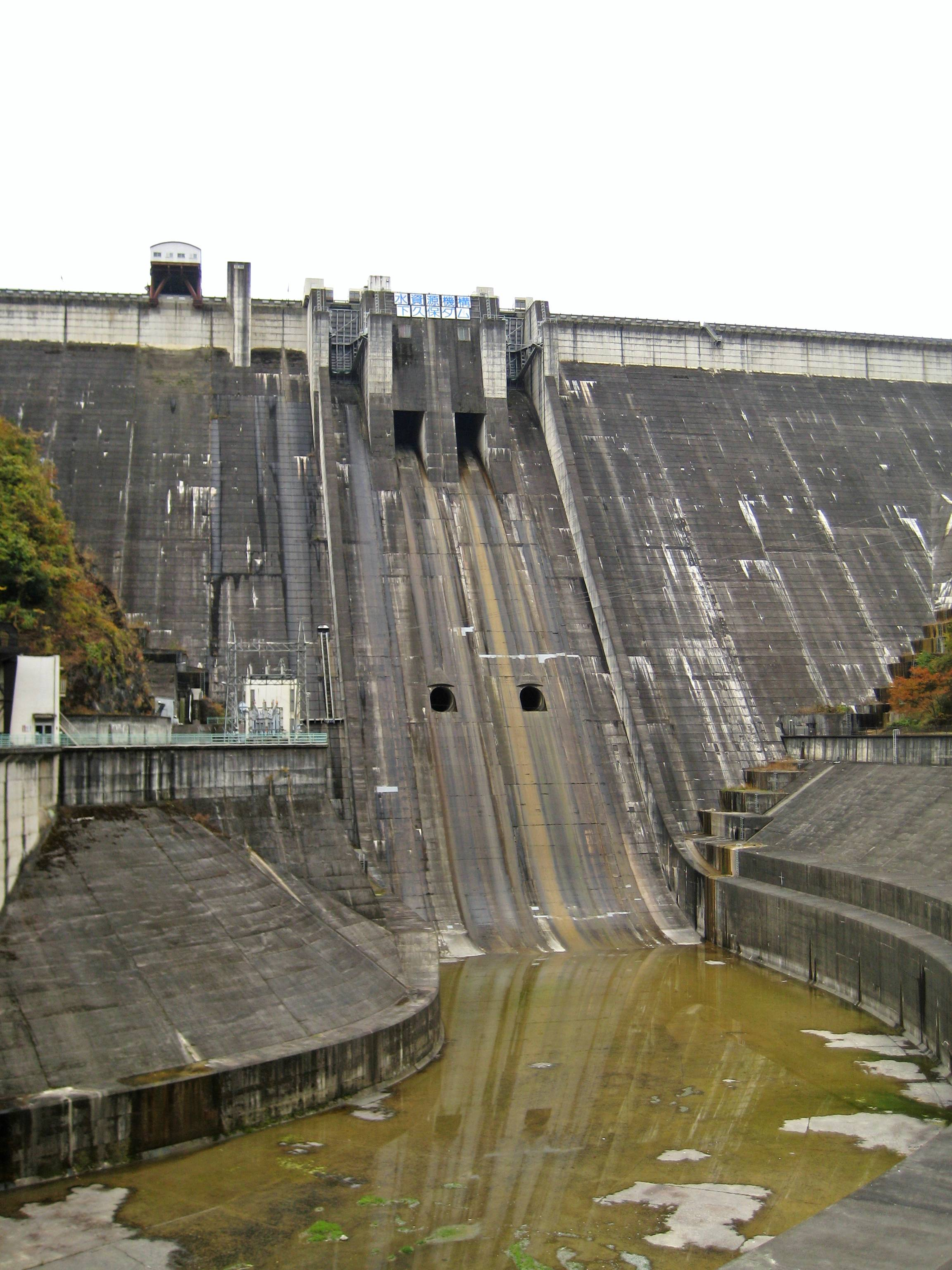
- Interactive map of Shimokubo Dam
- Location: Gunma Prefecture, Japan.
- Coordinates: 36°07′57″N 139°01′21″E
- Construction began: 1959
- Opening date: 1968

Dam and spillways
- Type of dam: Gravity
- Impounds: Kanna River
- Height: 129 m (423 ft)
- Length: 605 m (1,985 ft)

Reservoir
- Total capacity: 130,000,000 m^{3} (4.6×10^{9} cu ft)
- Catchment area: 322.9 km^{2} (124.7 sq mi)
- Surface area: 327 hectares

Shimokubo Dam is a dam in the Gunma Prefecture of Japan, completed in 1968.

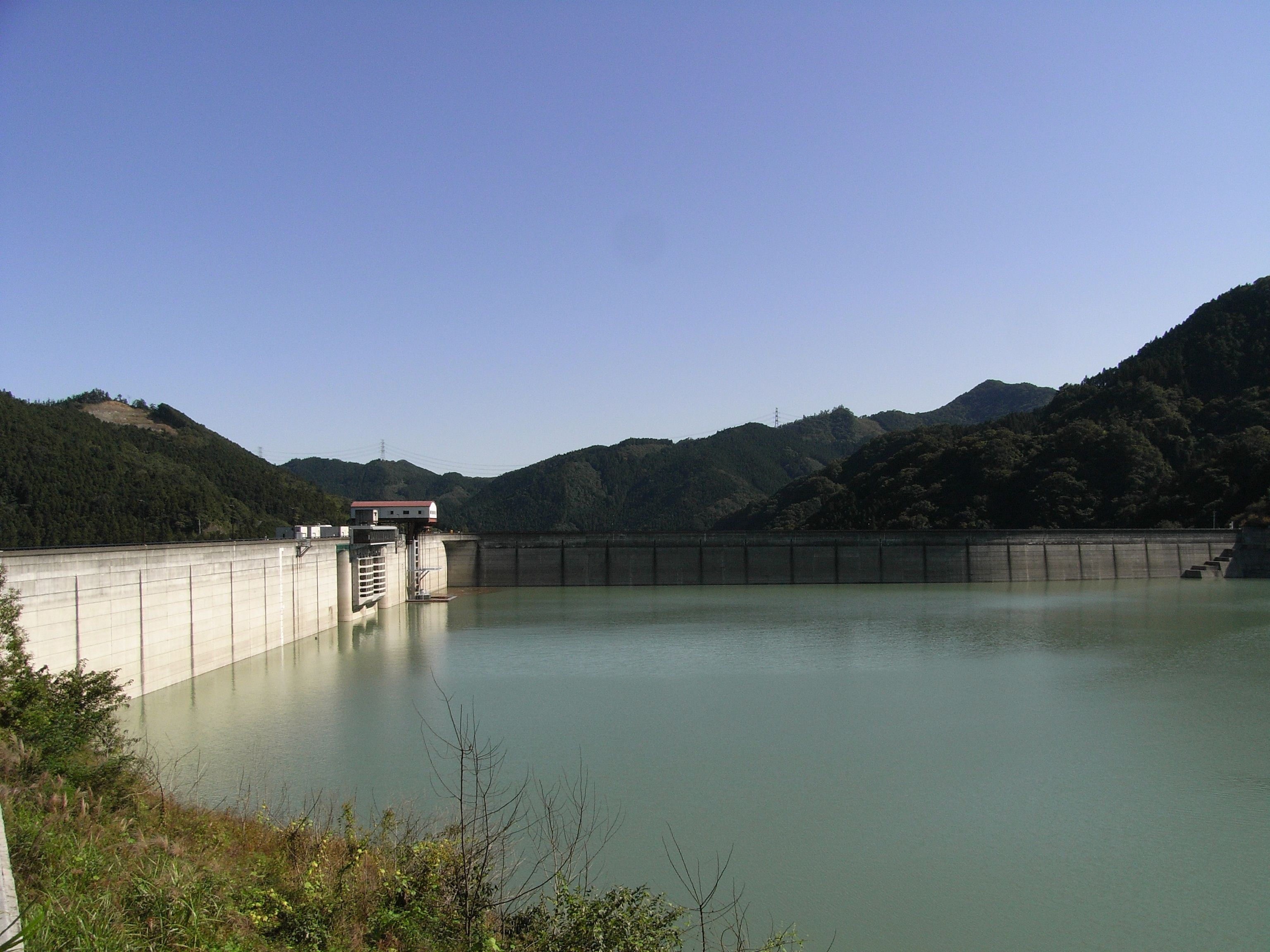
