= Fujioka, Gunma =

Fujioka 藤岡市
- City
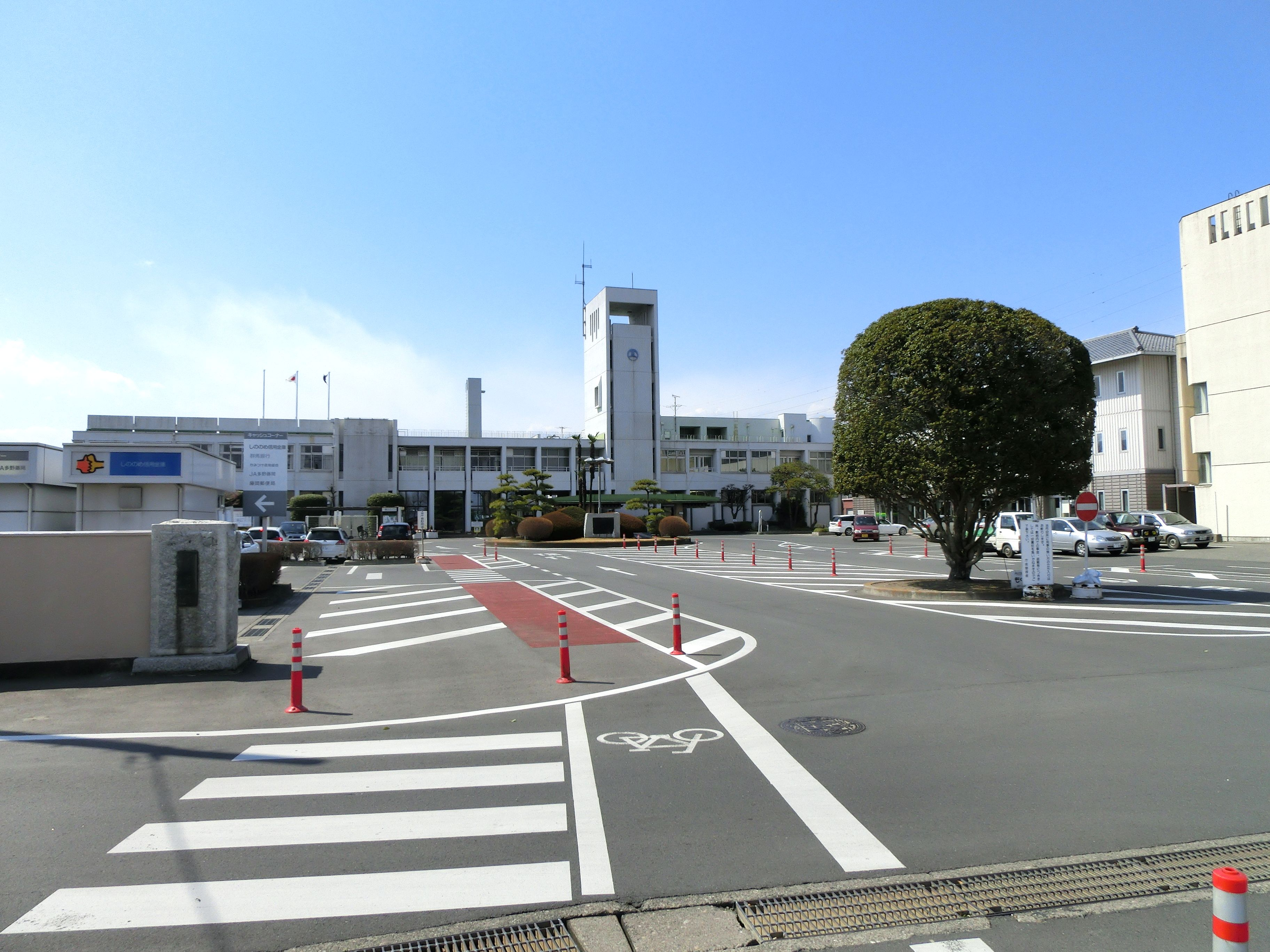
- Fujioka city hall

- Flag Emblem

- Location of Fujioka in Gunma Prefecture

- Coordinates: 36°15′31.3″N 139°4′28.4″E
- Country: Japan
- Region: Kantō
- Prefecture: Gunma
- First official recorded: 5th century AD (official)
- Town settled: April 1, 1889
- City settled: April 1, 1954

Government
  - Mayor: Masahiro Arai (from May 2018)

Area
  - Total: 180.29 km^{2} (69.61 sq mi)

Population (August 1, 2020)
  - Total: 64,539
  - Density: 357.97/km^{2} (927.15/sq mi)
- Time zone: UTC+9 (Japan Standard Time)
- Tree: Cinnamomum camphora, Sweet Osmanthus
- Flower: Wisteria, Scarlet sage
- Phone number: 0274-22-1211
- Address: 327 Nakakurisu, Fujioka-shi, Gunma-ken 375-8601
- Website: Official website

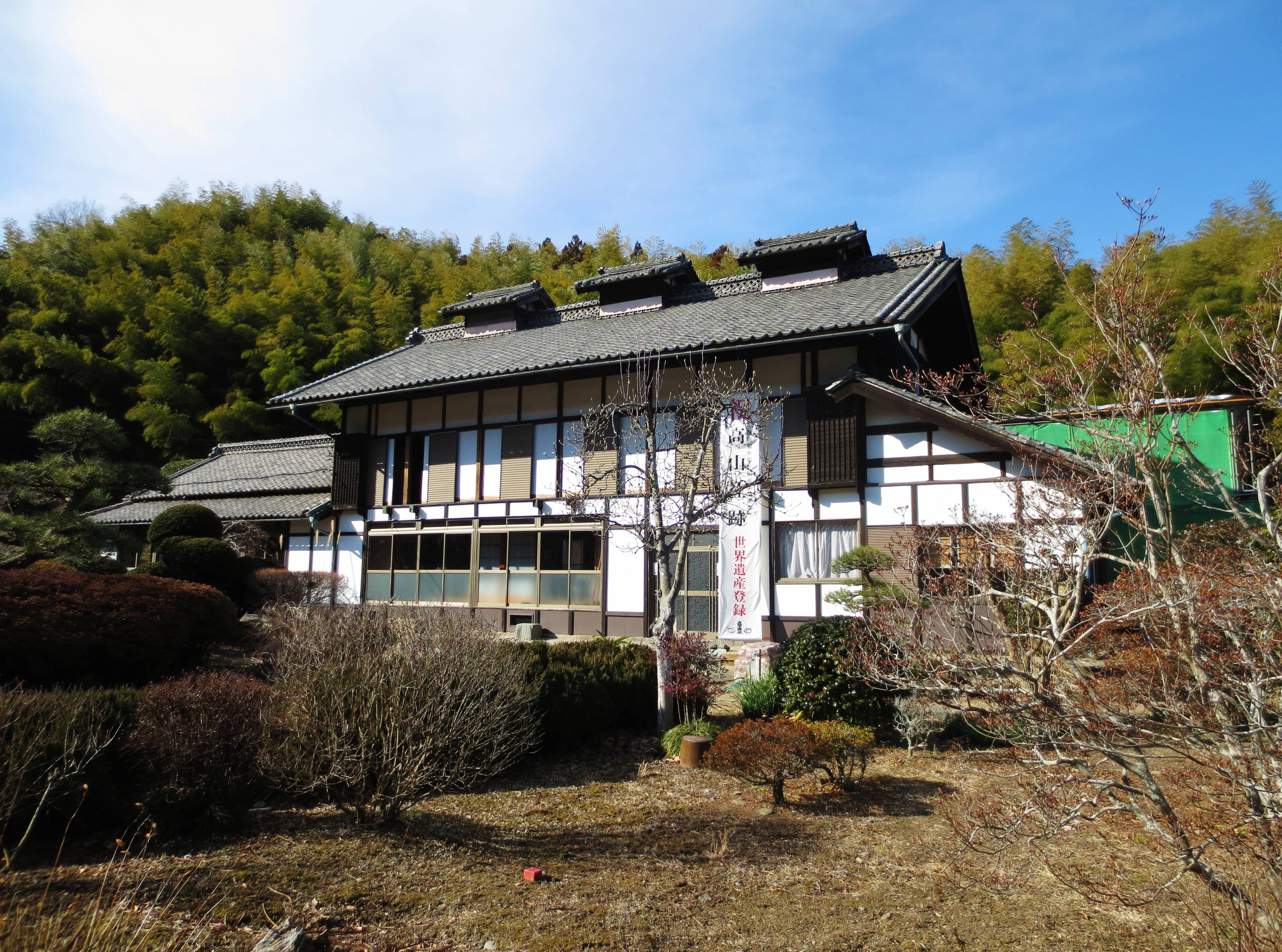
Takayama-sha Sericulture school

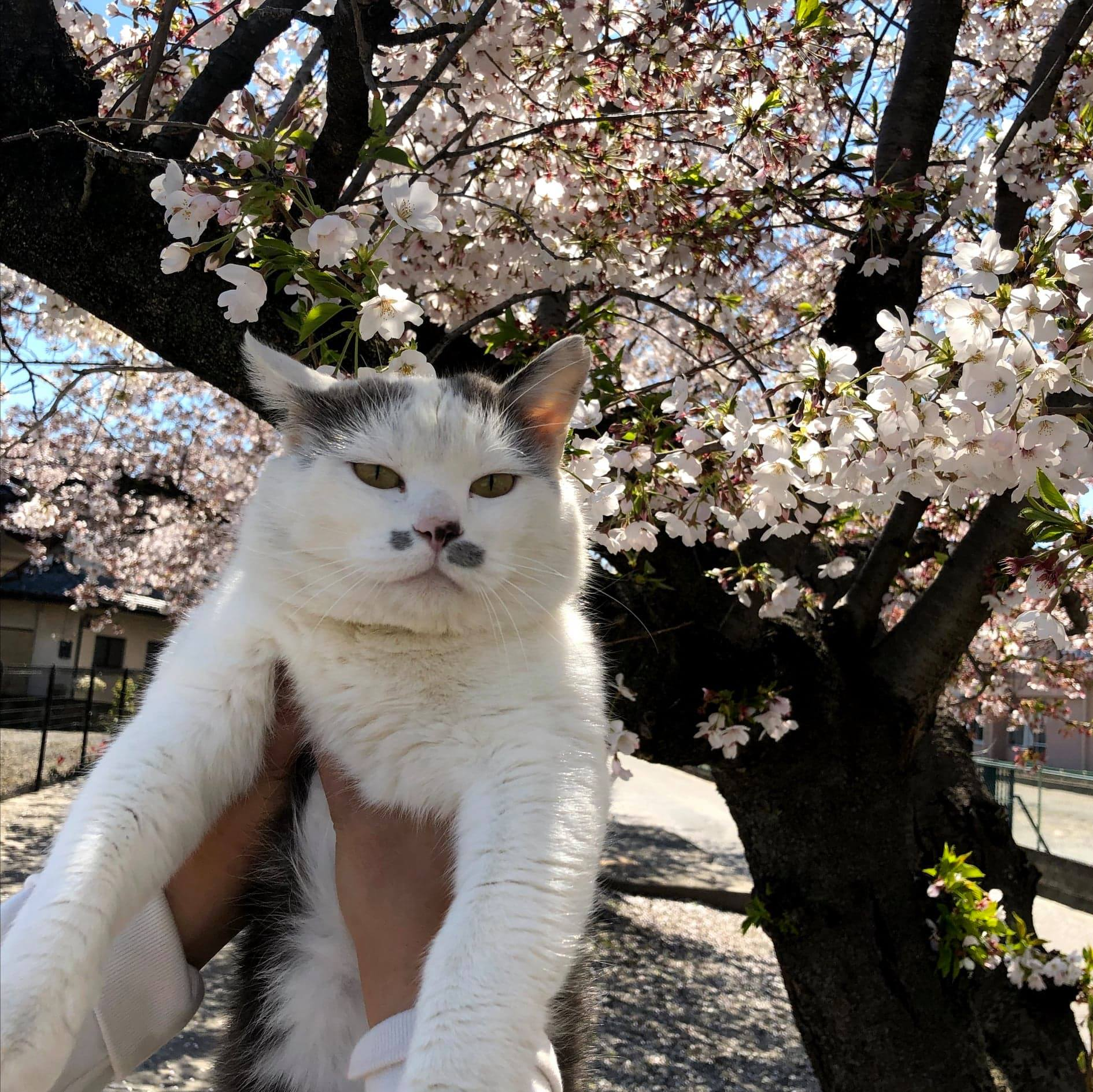
This photo shows a cat with a cherry blossom tree in the background during the spring season in Fujioka.

Fujioka (藤岡市, Fujioka-shi) is a city located in Gunma Prefecture, Japan. As of 1 August 2020, the city had an estimated population of 64,539 in 27,616 households, and a population density of 360/km^{2} (930/sq mi). The total area of the city is 180.29 km^{2} (69.61 sq mi).

== Geography ==
Fujioka is located on the southern border of Gunma Prefecture, bordered by Saitama Prefecture to the south.

=== Physical features ===
==== Mountains ====
- Amefuriyama (雨降山)
- Higashi-Mikaboyama (東御荷鉾山) 1286m
- Koshinyama (庚申山)
- Nishi-Mikaboyama (西御荷鉾山), 1246m
- Sakurayama (桜山), 591m
- Takayama (高山)

==== Rivers ====
- Ayugawa (鮎川)
- Kaburagawa (鏑川)
- Kannagawa (神流川)
- Karasugawa
- Nukuigawa (温井川)
- Sannagawa (三名川)
- Sasagawa (笹川)

==== Lakes and marshes ====
- Kannako (神流湖)
- Sannako (三名湖)
- Ayugawako (鮎川湖)
- Takenuma (竹沼)

=== Surrounding municipalities ===
Gunma Prefecture

- Kanna
- Kanra
- Shimonita
- Takasaki
- Tamamura

Saitama Prefecture

- Chichibu
- Kamikawa
- Kamisato

=== Climate ===
Fujioka has a humid subtropical climate (Köppen Cfa) characterized by warm summers and cold winters with heavy snowfall. The average annual temperature in Fujioka is 13.8 °C. The average annual rainfall is 1239 mm with September as the wettest month. The temperatures are highest on average in August, at around 26.1 °C, and lowest in January, at around 2.5 °C.

== Demographics ==
Per Japanese census data, the population of Fujioka has remained relatively steady over the past 40 years.

Historical population
Year	Pop.	±%
1920	41,333	—
1930	42,587	+3.0%
1940	45,201	+6.1%
1950	56,304	+24.6%
1960	52,033	−7.6%
1970	55,031	+5.8%
1980	63,594	+15.6%
1990	69,413	+9.2%
2000	70,220	+1.2%
2010	67,962	−3.2%
2020	64,539	−5.0%

== History ==
Fujioka is located within traditional Kōzuke Province. During the late Sengoku period it developed as a jōkamachi around Ashida Castle, the center of a 30,000 koku holding by the Ashida clan, retainers of Tokugawa Ieyasu. However, with the foundation of the Edo period Tokugawa shogunate, the area became tenryō territory, under the direct control of the shogunate.

Following the Meiji Restoration and the creation of the modern municipalities system, Fujioka and Onishi towns, and Kanna, Ono, Midori, Mikuri, Hirai, Hino, and Sanbagawa Village were created in Midorino District, Gunma Prefecture and Mihara village in Minamikanra District, Gunma Prefecture on April 1, 1889. In 1896, Minamikanra District was united with Midorino District and Tago District to create Tano District. On April 1, 1954, Fujioka annexed Kanna, Ono, Midori and Mikuri villages and was elevated to city status. On March 1, 1955 Fujioka annexed neighboring Hirai and Sanbagawa villages. On January 1, 2006 Onishi Village was merged into Fujioka City.

== Government ==
Fujioka has a mayor-council form of government with a directly elected mayor and a unicameral city council of 18 members. Fujioka, together with the town of Kanna, and the village of Ueno contributes two members to the Gunma Prefectural Assembly. In terms of national politics, the town is part of Gunma 4th district of the lower house of the Diet of Japan.

== Education ==
Fujioka has 11 public elementary schools and five public middle schools operated by the city government, and three public high schools operated by the Gunma Prefectural Board of Education. The prefecture also operates a special education school for the handicapped.

=== High schools ===
- Fujioka Chuo (群馬県立藤岡中央高等学校)
- Fujioka Kita (群馬県立藤岡北高等学校)
- Fujioka Kogyo (群馬県立藤岡工業高等学校)

=== Middle schools ===
- Fujioka Higashi (藤岡市立東中学校)
- Fujioka Kita (藤岡市立北中学校)
- Fujioka Nishi (藤岡市立西中学校)
- Fujioka Onishi (藤岡市立鬼石中学校)
- Fujioka Ono (藤岡市立小野中学校)

=== Elementary schools ===
- Fujioka Dai-ichi (藤岡第一小学校)
- Fujioka Dai-ni (藤岡第二小学校)
- Hino (日野小学校)
- Hirai (平井小学校)
- Kanna (神流小学校)
- Midori (美土里小学校)
- Mikuri Higashi (美九里東小学校)
- Mikuri Nishi (美九里西小学校)
- Ono (小野小学校)
- Onishi (鬼石小学校)
- Onishi Kita (鬼石北小学校)

== Transportation ==
=== Railway ===
JR East – Hachikō Line

- Gunma-Fujioka - Kita-Fujioka

=== Highway ===
==== Expressways ====
Two expressways converge at the Fujioka Junction.

- Kan-etsu Expressway - Fujioka Junction
- Jōshin-etsu Expressway - Fujioka Interchange (IC), Fujioka Parking Area (PA)

==== National highways ====
- National Route 17
- National Route 254
- National Route 462

== Local attractions ==
- Fujioka History Museum
- Sanbaseki Gorge, National Place of Scenic Beauty
- Site of Hirai Castle
- Shimokubo Dam
- Shinsui Dam
- Takenuma Dam

=== National Historic Sites ===
- Hongō Haniwa Kiln ruins
- Nanakoshiyama Kofun
- Shiroishi Inariyama Kofun
- Takayamasha Sericulture School, also a UNESCO World Heritage Site
- Yuzurihara Stone Age Residence Site

=== Annual events ===
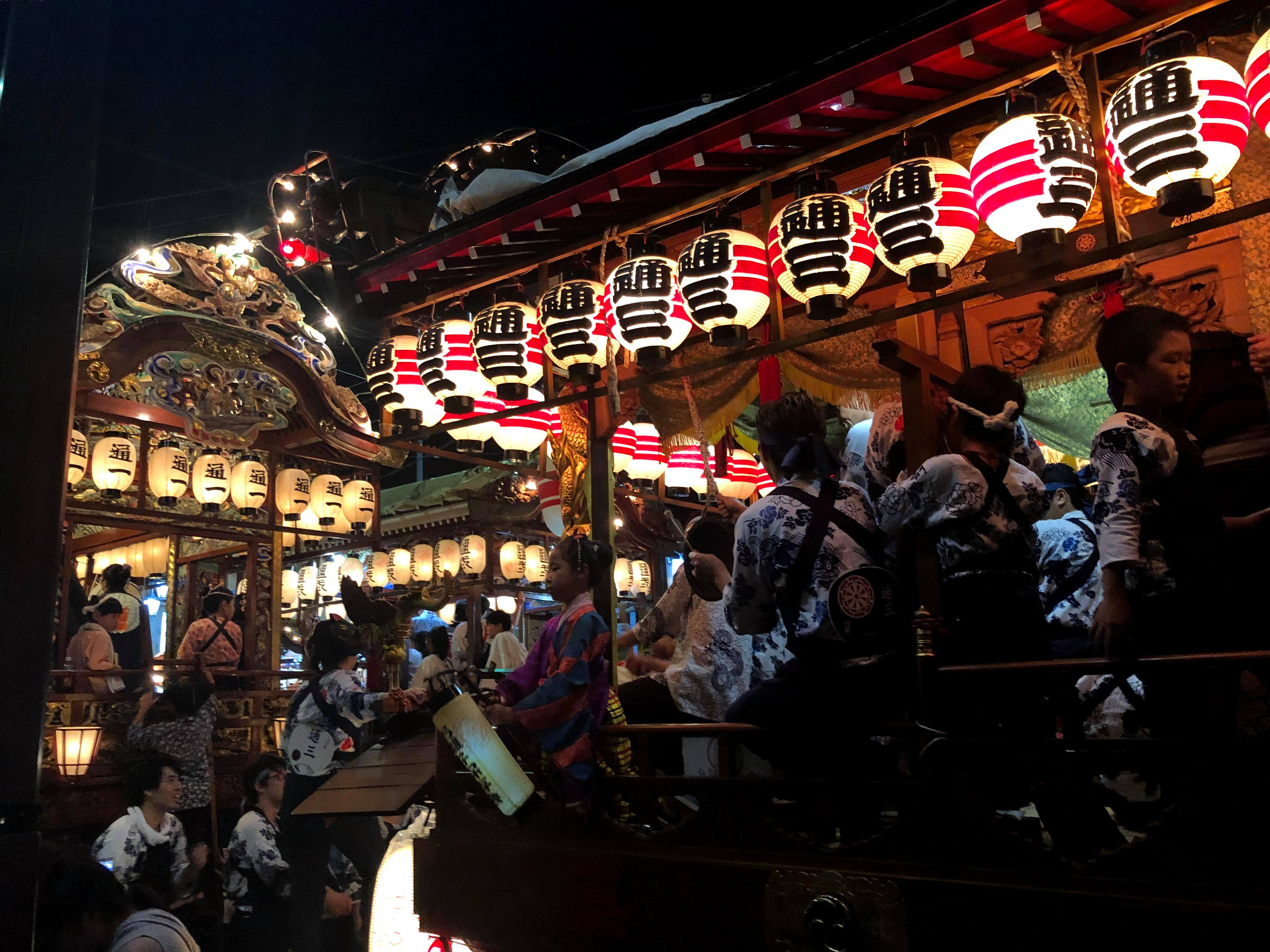
- Matsuri Festival in Fujioka-shi, Gunma
  Fujioka Matsuri

The Fujioka Matsuri is a two-day summer festival which is typically held on a weekend in late July. The celebration, which takes place in central Fujioka, features food and entertainment stalls, a flea market, parade, and street dancing. There are many traditional events as well, such as taiko performances, mikoshi carrying, and the parading of dashi floats through the streets.

- Fuji Matsuri

The Fuji Matsuri (Wisteria Festival) is a spring festival which takes place at Koshinyama Park every year in late April/early May, to celebrate the blooming of the wisteria flowers. Numerous vendor stalls sell various local products, food, and flowers. The wisteria flowers are illuminated after sunset.

== Noted people from Fujioka ==
- Fuku Amagawa, ramen chef
- Jiro Horikoshi- aeronautical engineer, who designed the Mitsubishi A6M Zero and other notable aircraft
- Hidehiko Hoshino- guitarist of the rock band Buck-Tick
- Hisashi Imai- guitarist of the rock band Buck-Tick
- Hideyuki Nakayama, actor
- Atsushi Sakurai- vocalist of the rock band Buck-Tick

== Sister cities ==
- Hakui, Ishikawa, Japan
- Jiangyin, China, since April 28, 2000
- Regina, Saskatchewan, Canada, since August 3, 2019
