= Shiroishi Inariyama Kofun =

Kofun period burial mound in Gunma Prefecture, Japan

- 白石稲荷山古墳 (Japanese)
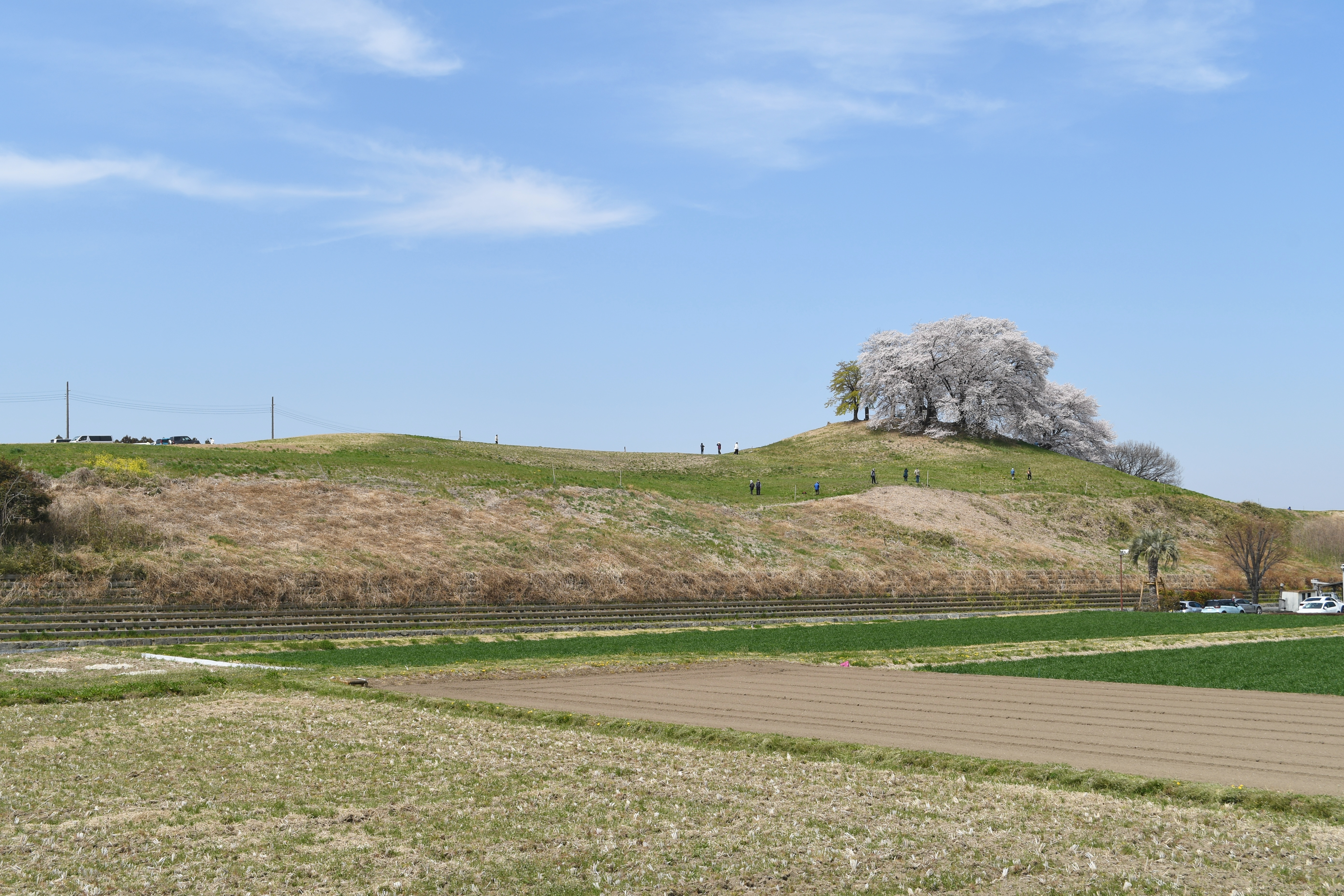
- Shiroishi Inariyama Kofun

- Shiroishi Inariyama Kofun Shiroishi Inariyama Kofun (Japan)
- 36°15′16″N 139°02′25″E
- Type: kofun
- Periods: Kofun period
- Location: Shiroishi, Fujioka, Gunma, Japan
- Region: Kantō region

History
- Built: early 5th century

Site notes
- Public access: Yes (Park)

The Shiroishi Inariyama Kofun (白石稲荷山古墳) is a Kofun period burial mound located in the Shiroishi neighborhood of the city of Fujioka, Gunma Prefecture in the northern Kantō region of Japan. It was designated a National Historic Site of Japan in 1993. It is one of several kofun in the Shiroishi Kofun cluster. The National Historic designation was expanded in 2009 to cover two nearby kofun: the Junitenzuka Kofun (十二天塚古墳) and the Junitenkitazuka Kofun (十二天塚北古墳) located immediately to the north..

== Overview ==
The Shiroishi Inariyama Kofun tumulus is located on hilly terrain 1.5 km south of the confluence of the Aburagawa and Ayugawa rivers at an elevation of 120 meters, and is one of a cluster of kofun tumuli in the area. It is a zenpō-kōen-fun (前方後円墳), which is shaped like a keyhole, having one square end and one circular end, when viewed from above with a total length of 155 meters and was built in three tiers, partially by cutting away natural hills to the north and south, and utilizing a natural valley to the east and cliff to the west. The first and second tiers were originally covered in fukiishi revetment stones with rows of cylindrical and morning glory-shaped haniwa encircled the posterior circular portion of the mound on all three tiers, but only partially on the base and third tier of the rectangular portion. The narrow constriction connecting the circular and rectangular mounds widens into a plectrum shape midway. A moat existed on the north and south sides.

Preliminary investigations were conducted in 1933 and a new archaeological excavation was conducted from 1985 to 1986. In the 1933 excavation, two burial chambers in the posterior circular portion of the tumulus were found and opened and a number of grave goods were recovered, including two unique two stone pillows. Other grave goods included a large number of stone imitations of various everyday items, bronze mirrors, iron weapons, magatama and round beads were excavated. These items and also haniwa in the shape of houses are now stored at the Tokyo National Museum. A ground penetrating radar survey was performed by the Gunma Prefectural Museum of History and Waseda University from April 2018 to May 2019. The survey found that the tumulus length, which was thought to be 140 meters, was actually 155 meters, and the tumulus was re-dated to at least the beginning of the 5th century AD. In addition, the presence of a third burial chamber within the anterior rectangular portion of the tumulus was found.

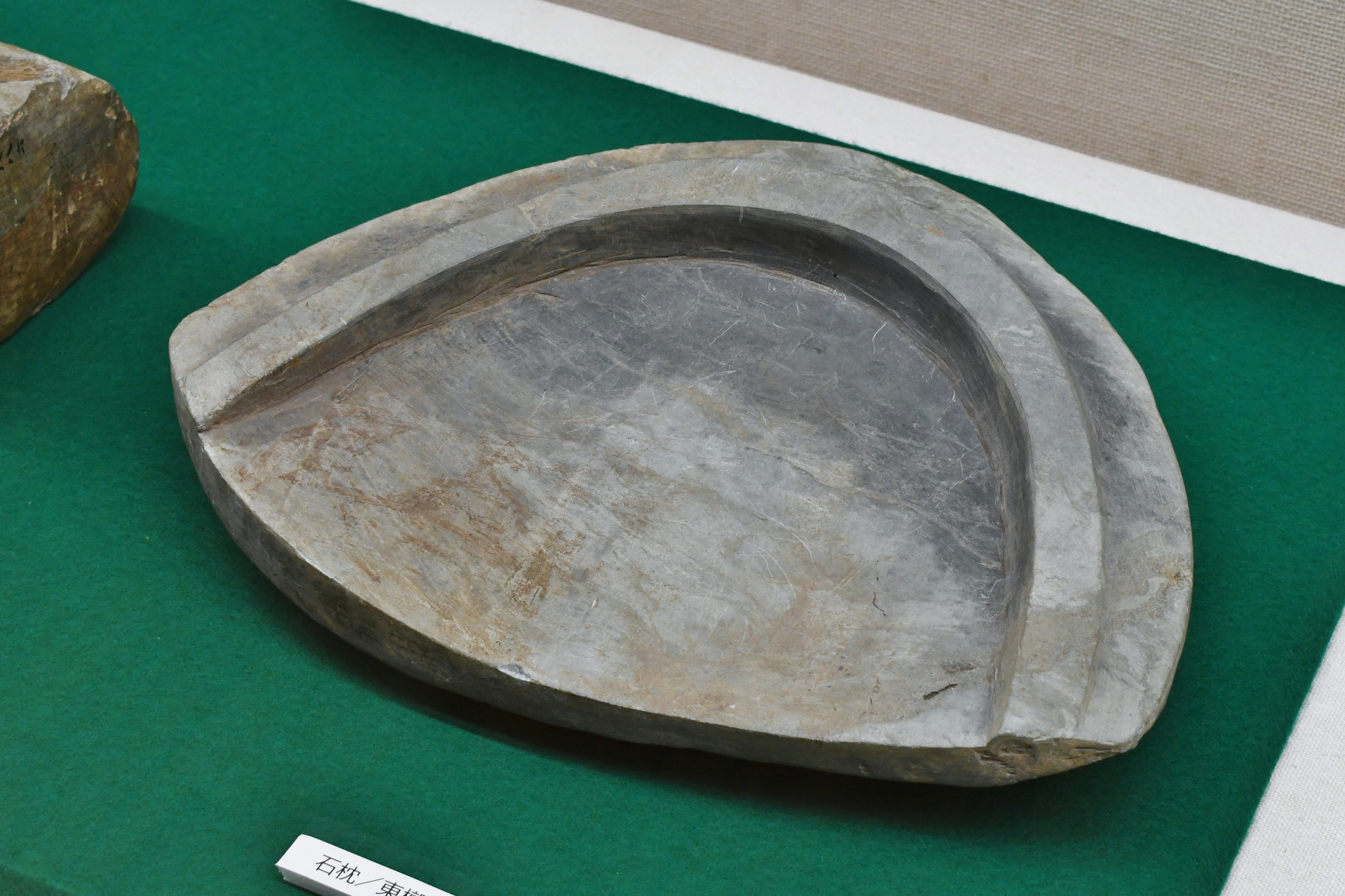
Stone Pillow

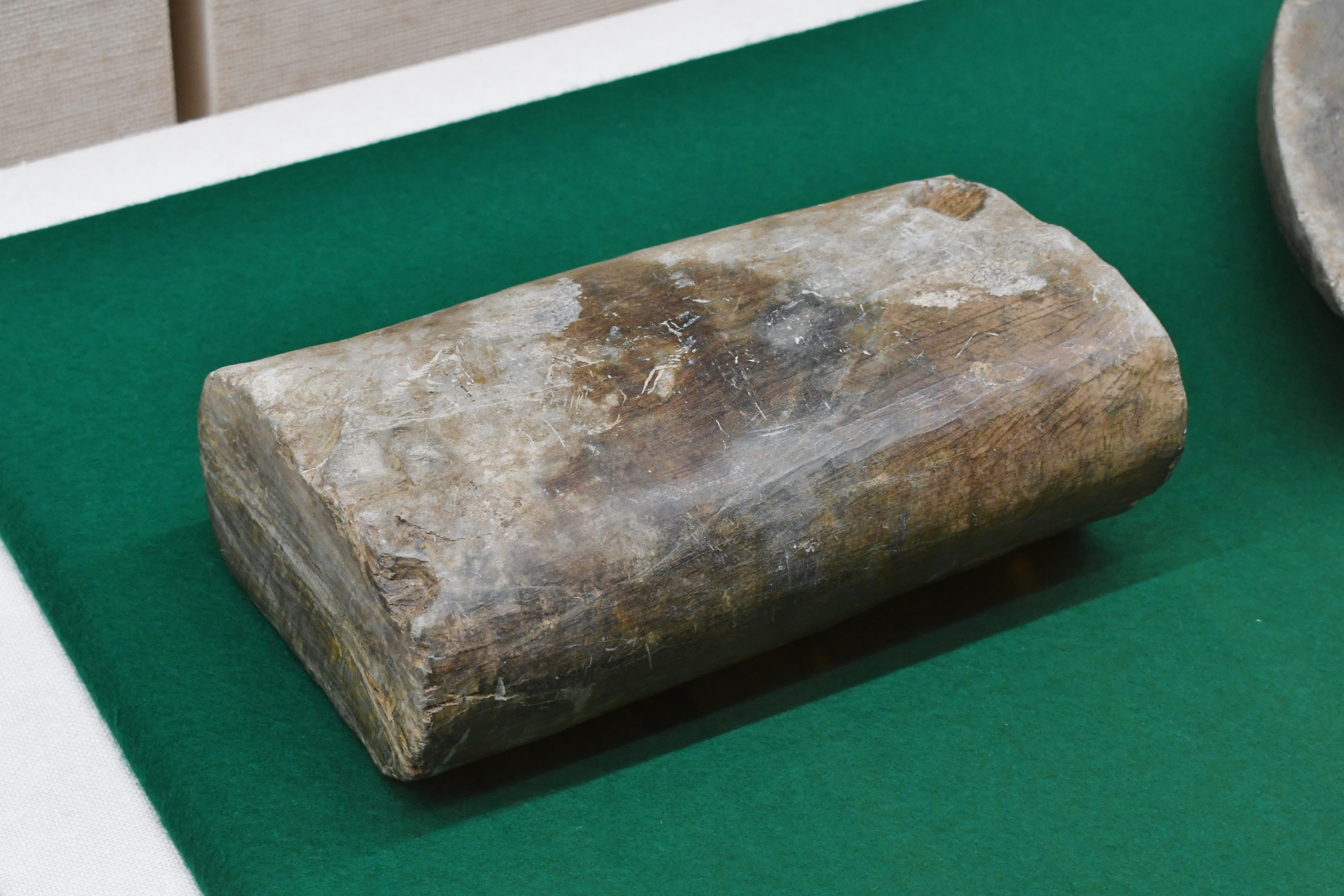
Stone Pillow

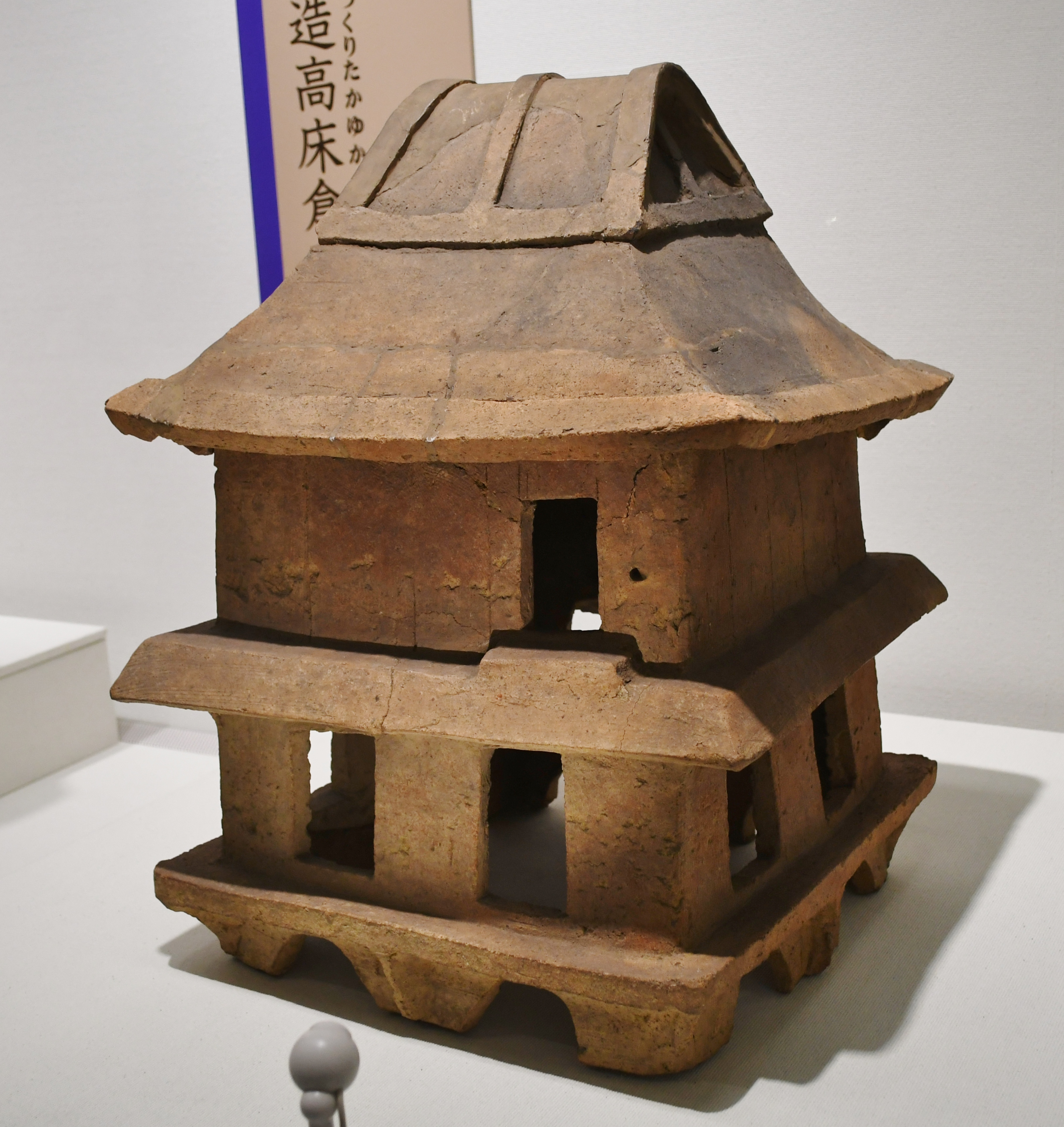
Haniwa Hip-roofed Raised Warehouse

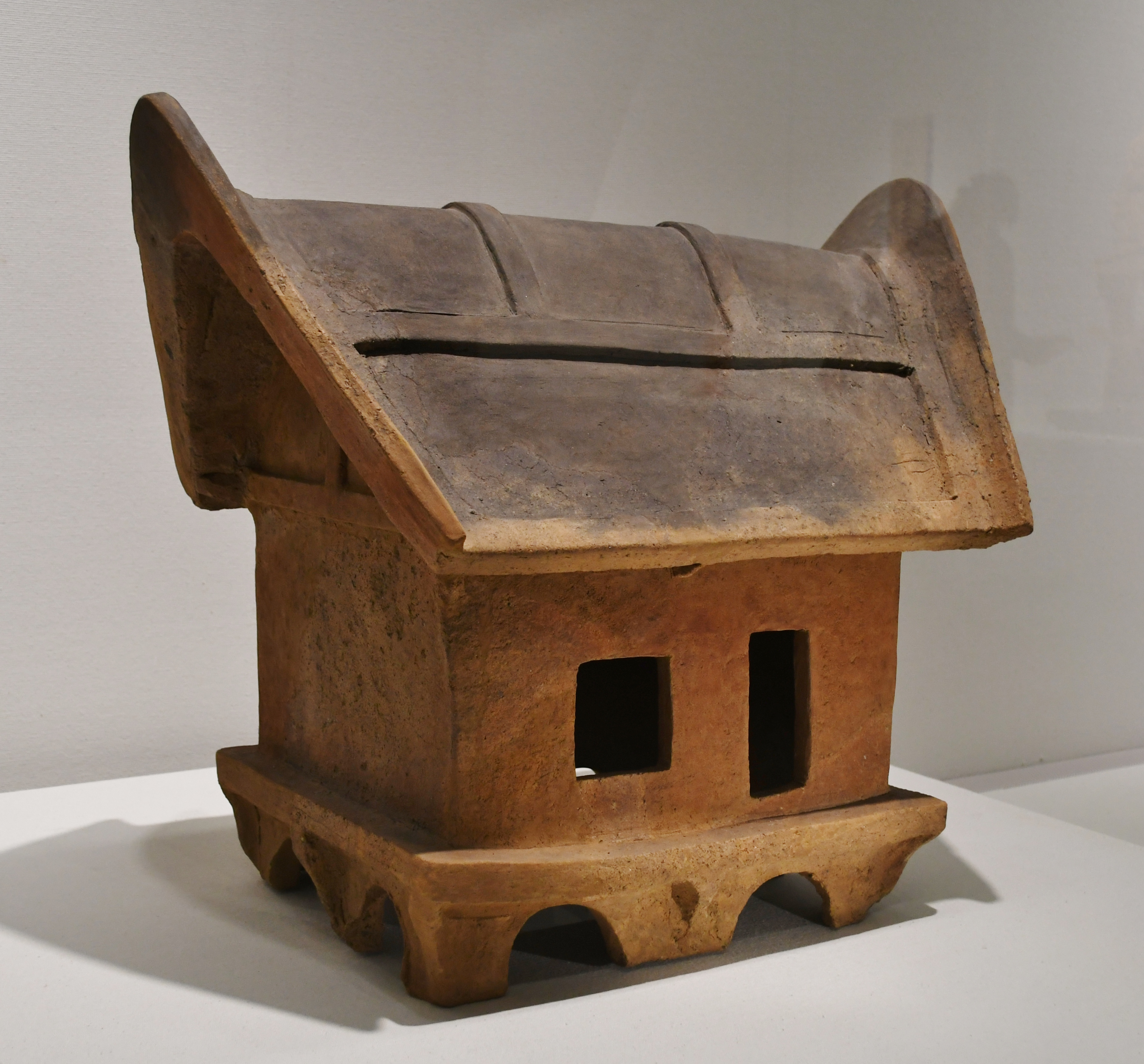
Haniwa Gable-roofed House

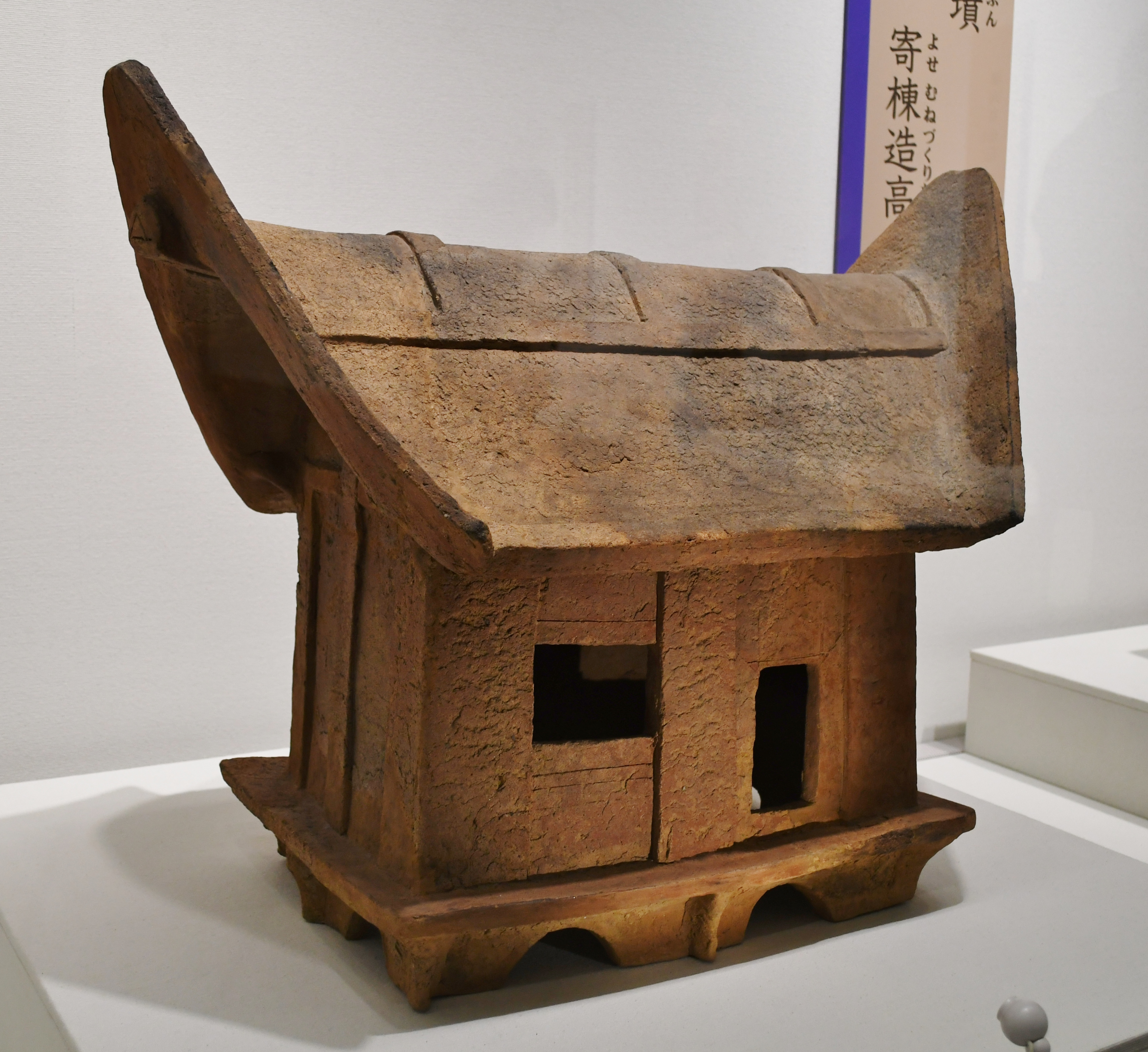
Haniwa Gable-roofed House

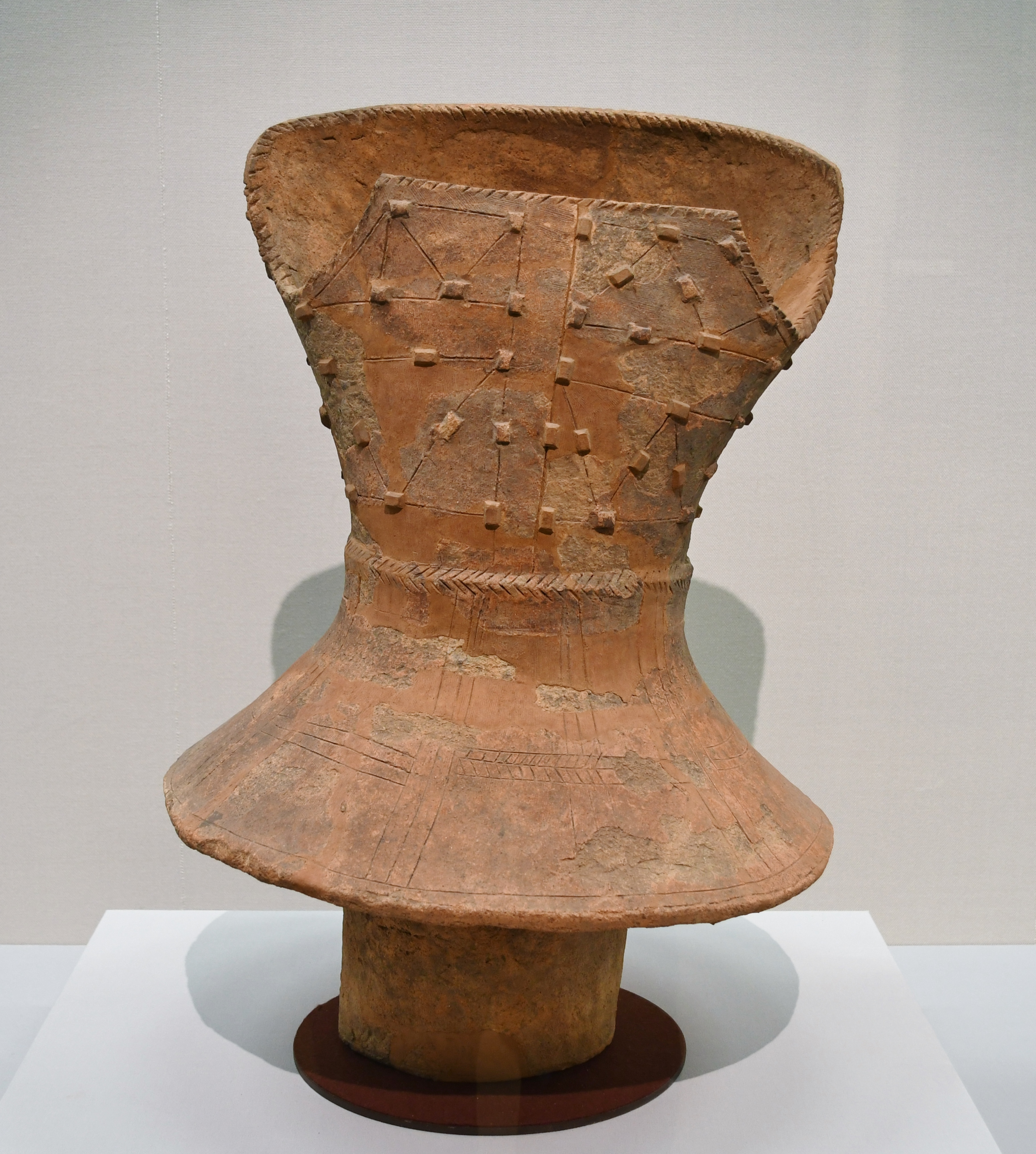
Haniwa Warrior with short armor,

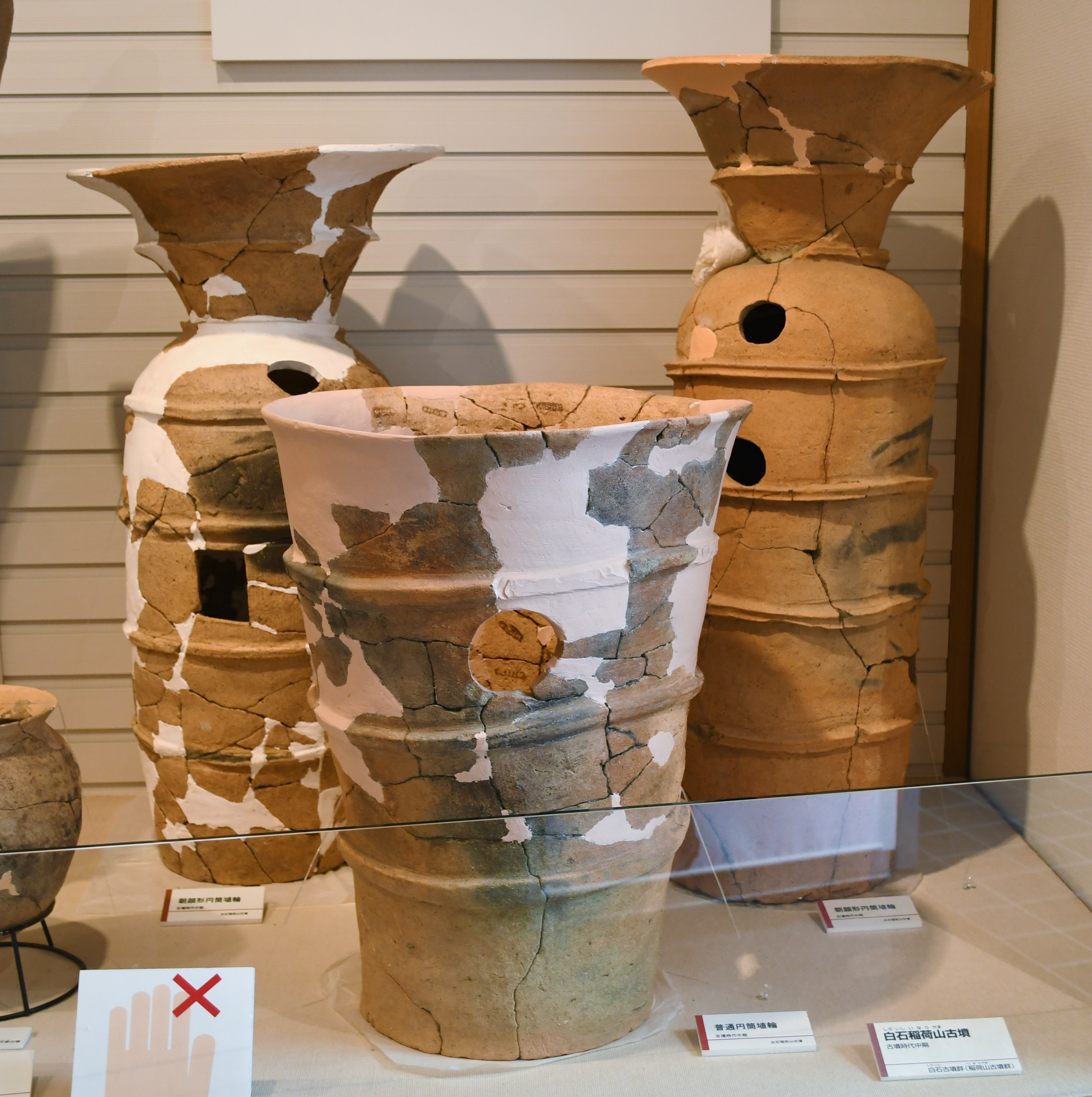
Cylindrical & Morning glory-shaped haniwa

Shiroishi Inariyama Kofun

- Overall length: 155 meters
- Posterior circle: 92 meter diameter x 13.5 meters high
- Anterior rectangular portion: 81 meter width x 8.5 meters high

Junitenzuka Kofun

- Overall length: 36.8 meters
- Posterior circle: 26.8 meter diameter x 2.6 meters high

Junitenkitazuka Kofun

- Overall length: 23 meters
- Posterior circle: 22 meter diameter x 2.2 meters high

The tumuli are located about 20 minutes by car from Gunma-Fujioka Station on the JR East Hachikō Line.

== See also ==
- List of Historic Sites of Japan (Gunma)
