= Myōgi-Arafune-Saku Kōgen Quasi-National Park =

National Park in Nagano

Coordinates: 36°12′N 138°42′E

- 妙義荒船佐久高原国定公園
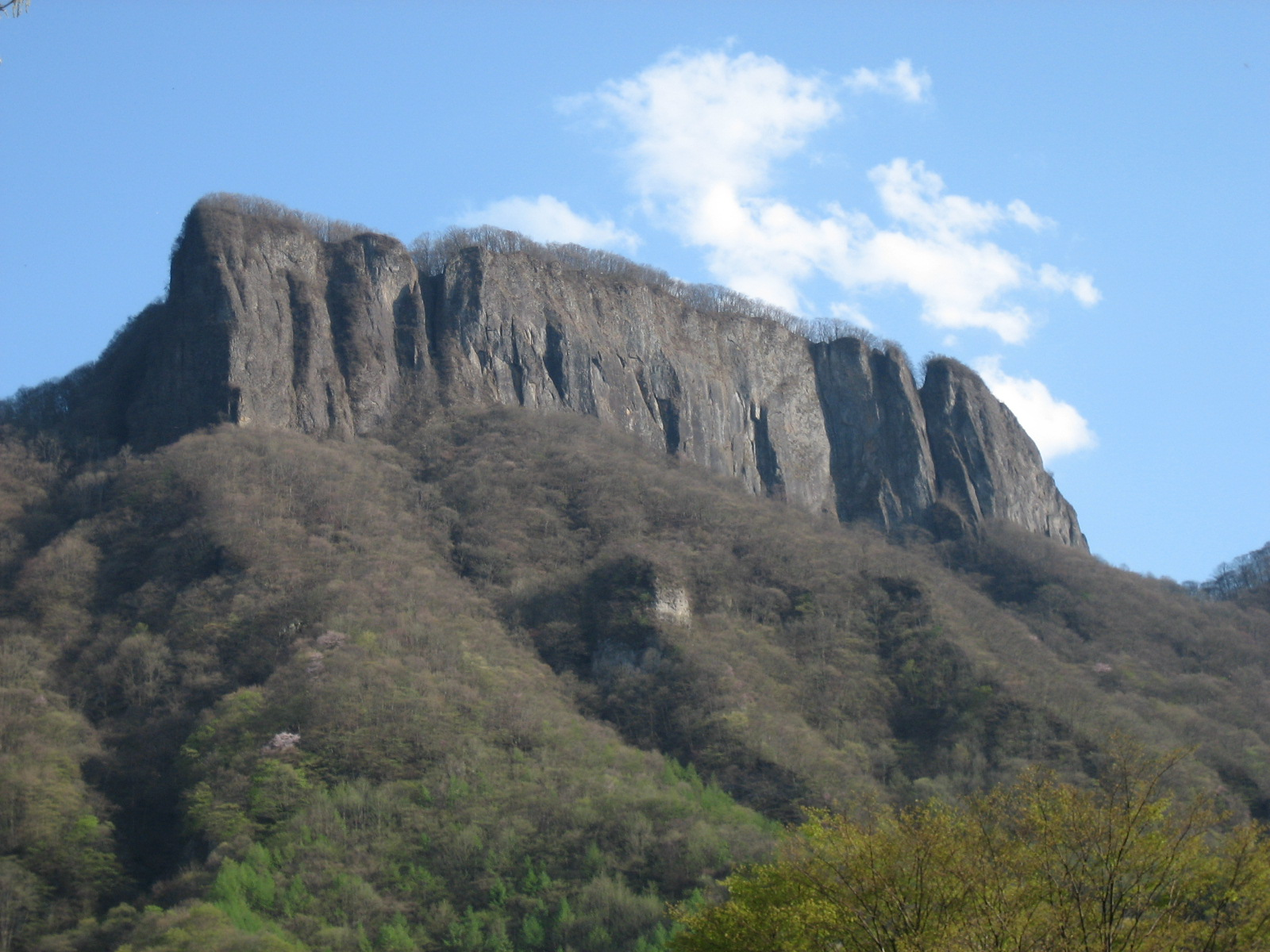
- Mount Arafune (1,423 m)

- Location within Japan
- Location: Gunma/Nagano Prefecture, Japan
- Area: 131.23 km^{2} (50.67 sq mi)
- Established: 10 April 1969

Myōgi-Arafune-Saku Kōgen Quasi-National Park (妙義荒船佐久高原国定公園, Myōgi-Arafune-Saku Kōgen Kokutei Kōen) is a Quasi-National Park on the borders of Gunma and Nagano Prefectures, Japan. Established in 1969, the central feature of the park are Mounts Arafune (荒船山) (1,423 m) and Myōgi (1,104 m).

== Related municipalities ==
- Gunma: Annaka, Nanmoku, Shimonita, Tomioka, Ueno
- Nagano: Karuizawa, Kitaaiki, Miyota, Saku, Sakuho

== See also ==
- National Parks of Japan
