= Shimonita, Gunma =

Shimonita 下仁田町
- Town
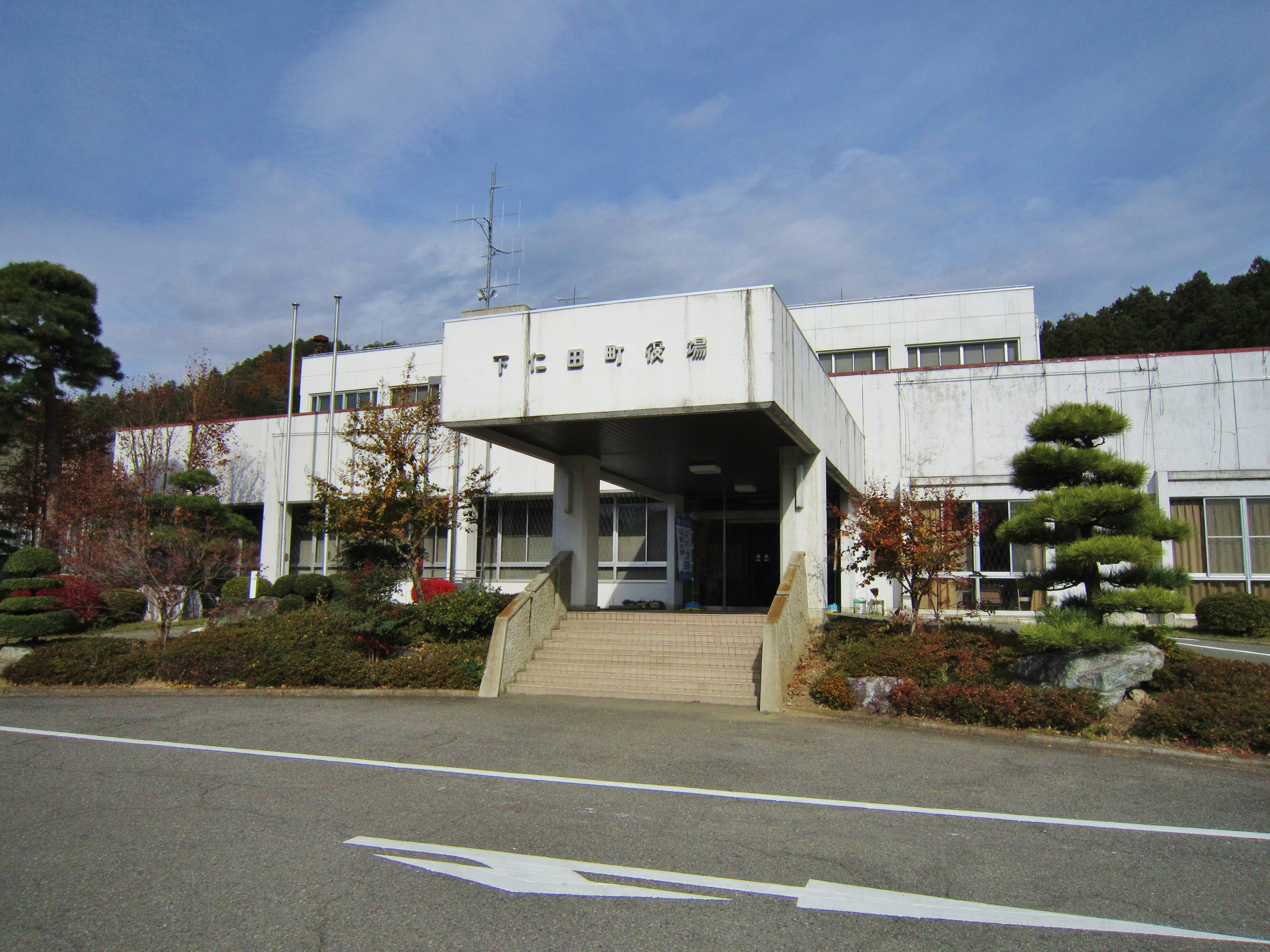
- Shimonita town office

- Flag Seal

- Location of Shimonita in Gunma Prefecture

- Coordinates: 36°12′44.9″N 138°47′20.9″E
- Country: Japan
- Region: Kantō
- Prefecture: Gunma
- District: Kanra

Area
  - Total: 188.38 km^{2} (72.73 sq mi)

Population (October 2020)
  - Total: 7,058
  - Density: 37.47/km^{2} (97.04/sq mi)
- Time zone: UTC+9 (Japan Standard Time)
- Symbols
  - Tree: Cryptomeria
  - Flower: Sakura
  - Bird: Japanese bush-warbler
- Phone number: 0274-82-2111
- Address: 682 Shimonita, Shimonita-machi, Kanra-gun, Gunma-ken 370-2601
- Website: Official website

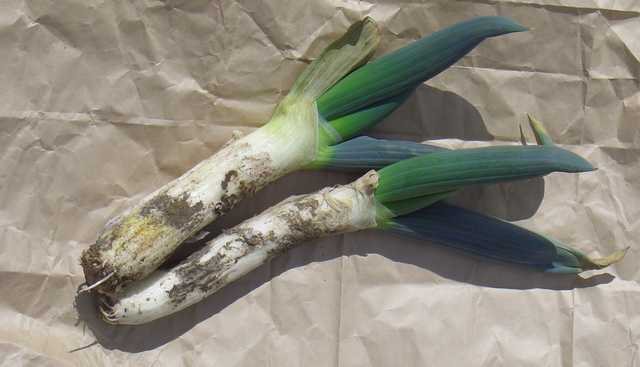
Shimonita onion

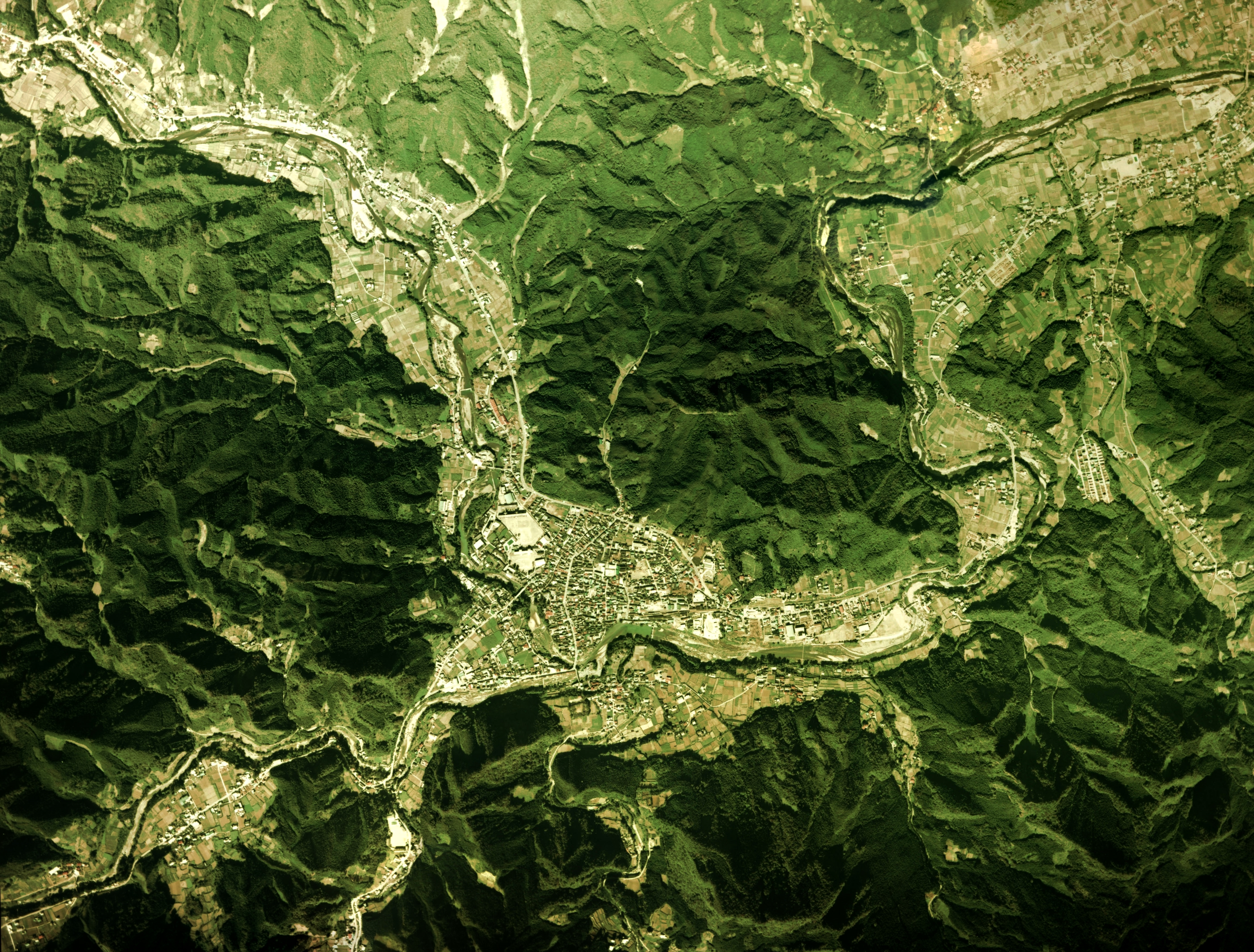
Shimonita town center

Shimonita (下仁田町, Shimonita-machi) is a town located in Gunma Prefecture, Japan. As of 31 August 2020, the town had an estimated population of 7,058 in 3,292 households, and a population density of 37 persons per km^{2}. The total area of the town is 188.38 square kilometres (72.73 sq mi). Shimonita is famous for its konjac and Welsh onion.

== Geography ==
Shimonita is located in southwestern Gunma Prefecture bordering on Nagano Prefecture to the west. Part of the town is within the borders of the Myōgi-Arafune-Saku Kōgen Quasi-National Park. Approximately 84% of the town's total area is covered by forests.

- Mountains: Mount Arafune (1423 m), Mount Inafukumi, Mount Ōgeta, Ozawadake, Kanatake, Mount Nikkura, Mount Yotsumata, Mount Monogatari, Mount Midō, Mount Myogi, Mount Monomi
- Rivers: Kabura River

=== Surrounding municipalities ===
Gunma Prefecture

- Annaka
- Fujioka
- Kanna
- Kanra
- Nanmoku
- Tomioka

Nagano Prefecture

- Karuizawa
- Saku

=== Climate ===
Shimonita has a humid continental climate (Köppen Cfa) characterized by warm summers and cold winters with heavy snowfall. The average annual temperature in Shimonita is 11.7 °C. The average annual rainfall is 1106 mm with September as the wettest month. The temperatures are highest on average in August, at around 31.1 °C, and lowest in January, at around -0.5 °C.

== Demographics ==
Per Japanese census data, the population of Shimonita has decreased steadily over the past 70 years.

Historical population
Year	Pop.	±%
1920	16,561	—
1930	18,206	+9.9%
1940	18,688	+2.6%
1950	22,450	+20.1%
1960	20,640	−8.1%
1970	17,573	−14.9%
1980	15,228	−13.3%
1990	13,683	−10.1%
2000	11,171	−18.4%
2010	8,911	−20.2%
2020	6,576	−26.2%

== History ==
During the Edo period, the area of present-day Shimonita was largely part of the tenryō territory held directly by Tokugawa shogunate within Kōzuke Province. The town of Shimonita was created within Kitakanra District of Gunma Prefecture on April 1, 1889, with the creation of the modern municipalities system after the Meiji Restoration. In 1950, Kitakanra District was renamed Kanra District. Shimonita annexed the neighboring villages of Osaka, Saimoku, Aokura and Mayama on March 10, 1955.

== Government ==
Shimonita has a mayor-council form of government with a directly elected mayor and a unicameral town council of 12 members. Shimonita, together with the other municipalities in Kanra District contributes one member to the Gunma Prefectural Assembly. In terms of national politics, the town is part of Gunma 5th district of the lower house of the Diet of Japan.

== Economy ==
The economy of Shimonita is heavily dependent on agriculture.

== Education ==
Shimonita has one public elementary school and one public middle school operated by the town government, and one public high school operated by the Gunma Prefectural Board of Education.

== Transportation ==
=== Railway ===
Jōshin Dentetsu - Jōshin Line

- Shimonita

=== Highway ===
- Jōshin-etsu Expressway – Shimonita IC
- National Route 254

== Local attractions ==
- Shimonita Onsen

== Noted people from Shimonita ==
- Miyuki Imori, actress, entertainer
