= Osaka (disambiguation) =

Osaka or Ōsaka may refer to:

- Osaka (大阪市, Ōsaka-shi), Japan's third largest city by population, the capital of Osaka Prefecture.
- Osaka Prefecture (大阪府, Ōsaka-fu), Japan's second smallest prefecture by area

Osaka may also refer to:

== Other locations ==
=== Japan ===
- Places called Osaka (小坂, meaning "small hill"):
  - Osaka, Gifu, former town
  - Osaka, Gunma former village
- Neighbourhoods called Ōsaka (逢坂, meaning "meeting hill") are situated in the following locations:
  - Tennōji Ward, Ōsaka
  - Ōtsu, Shiga Prefecture, the location of Mount Ōsaka
  - Shijōnawate City, Osaka Prefecture
  - Kashiba, Nara

=== United States ===
- Osaka, Virginia

== Music and film ==
- Osaka (album) by The Kickovers
- "Osaka", a song from the Hella album Tripper

== Other uses ==
- Osaka (surname), a Japanese surname
- Ayumu Kasuga, character from Azumanga Daioh, nicknamed "Osaka"
- Mari Osaka, a Haitian-Japanese, retired tennis player and fashion designer born in Osaka, Japan
- Naomi Osaka, a Haitian-Japanese, professional tennis player born in Osaka, Japan
