= Jōshū-Tomioka Station =

Railway station in Tomioka, Gunma Prefecture, Japan

Jōshū-Tomioka Station 上州富岡駅
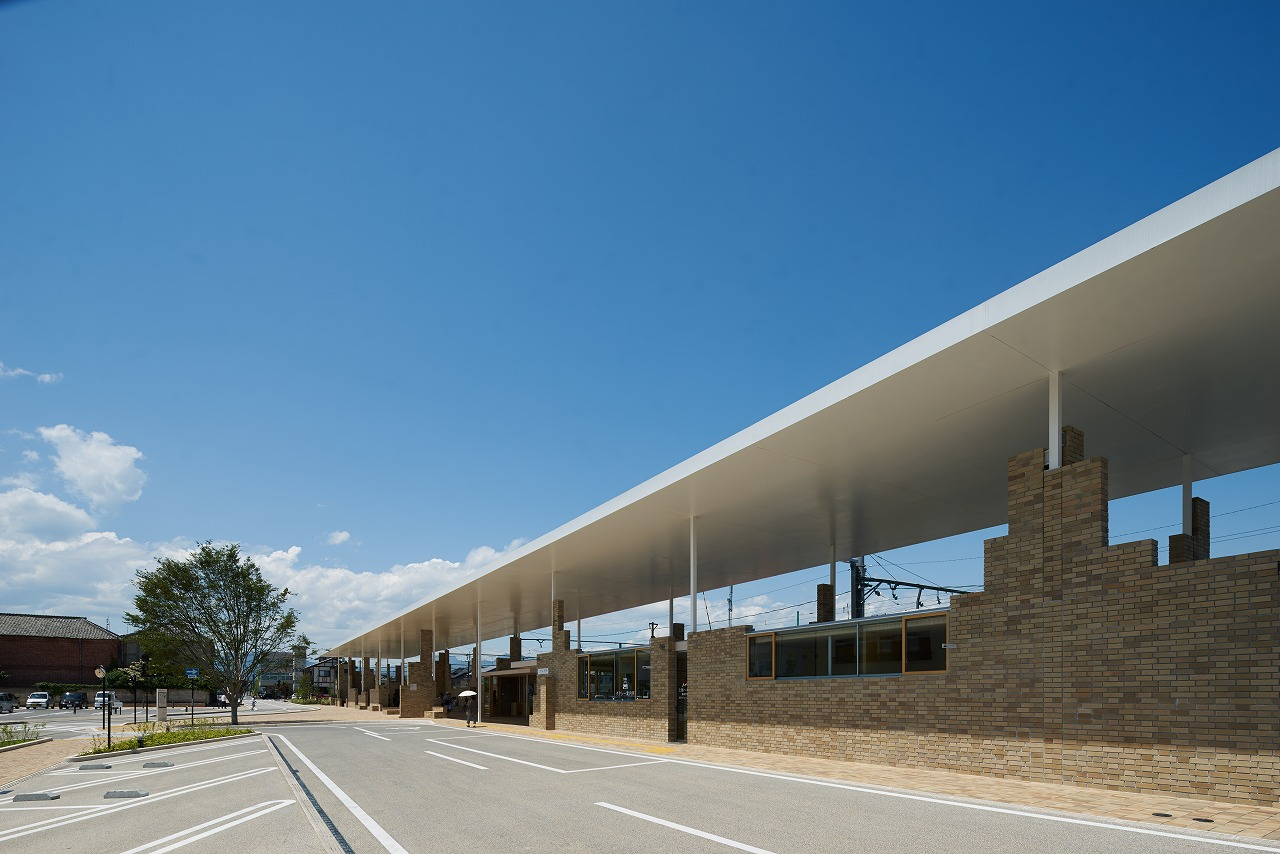
- Jōshū-Tomioka Station, October 2014

General information
- Location: Tomioka 1599-3, Tomioka-shi, Gunma-ken 370-2316; Japan
- Coordinates: 36°15′37.14″N 138°53′37.14″E
- Operator: Jōshin Dentetsu
- Line: ■ Jōshin Line
- Distance: 20.3 km from Takasaki
- Platforms: 1 side + 1 island platform

Other information
- Status: Staffed
- Website: Official website

History
- Opened: 2 July 1897
- Former names: Tomioka (to 1921)

Passengers
- FY2019: 441

Services
Preceding station	Joshin Electric Railway	Following station
Nishi-Tomioka towards Shimonita	Jōshin Line	Higashi-Tomioka towards Takasaki
Location
- Location within Gunma Prefecture Location within Japan

Jōshū-Tomioka Station (上州富岡駅, Jōshū-Tomioka eki) is a passenger railway station in the city of Tomioka, Gunma, Japan, operated by the private railway operator Jōshin Dentetsu.

== Lines ==
Jōshū-Tomioka Station is a station on the Jōshin Line and is 20.3 kilometers from the terminus of the line at Takasaki.

== Station layout ==
The station has a single side platform and a single island platform, connected to the station building by a level crossing.

=== Platforms ===
1	■ Jōshin Line	for Takasaki
2	■ Jōshin Line	for Shimonita
3	■ Jōshin Line	for starting trains

== History ==
Jōshū-Tomioka Station opened on 2 July 1897 as Tomioka Station (富岡駅, Tomioka-eki). It was renamed to its present name in 1921. The current station building was completed in 2014

== Surrounding area ==
- National Route 254
- Tomioka Post Office
- Tomioka City Hal

== See also ==
- List of railway stations in Japan
