= Nakatakase Kannonyama Site =

Archeological site in Tomioka, Gunma, Japan

- 中高瀬観音山遺跡 (Japanese)
- Nakatakase Kannonyama Site Nakatakase Kannonyama Site (Japan)
- 36°30′48″N 139°02′23″E
- Type: settlement
- Periods: Jōmon period
- Location: Shibukawa, Gunma, Japan
- Region: Kantō region

Site notes
- Discovered: 1926
- Public access: Yes

Nakatakase Kannonyama Site (中高瀬観音山遺跡, Nakatakase Kannonyama iseki) is an archaeological site containing the ruins of a Yayoi period settlement located in what is now the city of Tomioka, Gunma Prefecture in the northern Kantō region of Japan. The site was designated a National Historic Site of Japan in 1997.

== Overview ==
The Nakatakase Kannonyama Site is located at an elevation of 230 metes on the right bank of the Kabura River in the south-central part of Tomioka. It was discovered during construction work on the Joshin'etsu Expressway and was excavated from 1989 to 1990. It was found to contain the traces of a large-scale of Yayoi period settlement measuring from 200 meters east-to-west by 350 meters north-to-south. The foundations of pit dwellings were densely distributed in the flattened center of the hill and spread to the gentle southern slopes. The settlement was surrounded by a wooden palisade and also by a moat in the south. Artifacts discovered included Jōmon pottery through late Yayoi period earthenware, stone tools including stone knives and axes, spindle wheels as well as magatama and other glass beads. Further excavation revealed that the settlement contained upwards of 140 buildings, and was destroyed by fire, leading to speculation that it may have been burned in an ancient war.

The route of the expressway was changed to a tunnel in order to preserve the site, which was backfilled after excavation. It is located about 30 minutes on foot from Nishi-Tomioka Station of the Joshin Electric Railway.

== See also ==
- List of Historic Sites of Japan (Gunma)
