= Miyuki Imori =

Japanese actress (born 1968)

- 井森 美幸
- Born: October 26, 1968 (age 57); Shimonita, Kanra District, Gunma, Japan
- Occupations: Entertainer, idol, actress, singer
- Years active: 1985 -
- Agent: Horipro
- Height: 1.6 m (5 ft 3 in)
- Website: Official profile

Miyuki Imori (井森 美幸, Imori Miyuki; born October 26, 1968, in Shimonita, Kanra District, Gunma, Japan) is a Japanese entertainer, idol, actress, and singer who is represented by the talent agency, Horipro.

== Biography ==
Imori was born on October 26, 1968, in Shimonita, Kanra District, Gunma, Japan. She graduated from Horikoshi High School in Nakano, Tokyo, Japan. While still in high school, Imori was selected as a winner from among 120,000 contestants in the 9th Horipro Talent Scout Caravan competition in 1984.

She made her professional singing debut with "Swear by My Eye" (『瞳の誓い』, "Hitomi no Chikai") on April 21, 1985, after signing with Pony Canyon. Imori later won the Excellent Newcomer Emerald Award (優秀新人エメラルド賞, Yūshū Shinjin Emerarudo Shō) at the Megalopolis Song Festival (メガロポリス歌謡祭, Megaroporisu Kayōsai) with the same song.

== Filmography ==
=== TV series ===
| Year | Title | Role | Network | Notes |
|---|---|---|---|---|
| 1986 | Asobi Janai no yo, Kono Koi wa | | TBS | |
| 1987 | Wakataishō Tenka Gomen! | Oichi | TV Asahi | Episode 37 |
| 1987 | Dai Tokai 25-ji | | TV Asahi | Episode 3 |
| 1987 | Seito Shokun! | | Fuji TV | |
| 1987 | Dōkyūsei wa 13-sai | | Fuji TV | |
| 1988 | Konto Akashingō | | TBS | |
| 1988 | Giwaku no Kazoku | Takae Fuyuki | TBS | |
| 1989 | I Want You | | Fuji TV | |
| 1989 | Genshoku Renai Zukan | | TBS | Lead role |
| 1989 | Natsuyasumi Bessō Monogatari | | NTV | Lead role |
| 1989 | Sugishi hi no Serenade | | Fuji TV | |
| 1989 | Bachiatari Tokonatsu Musume | | TBS | Lead role |
| 1989 | Sayonara Ri Kōran | | Fuji TV | |
| 1990 | Top Stewardess Monogatari | | TBS | |
| 1990 | Joōbachi | | TV Asahi | |
| 1990 | Jikandesuyo | | TBS | |
| 1994 | Onī-chan no Sentaku | | TBS | |
| 1995 | Kagayaku Kisetsu no Naka de | | Fuji TV | |
| 2008 | Saikon Itchokusen! | Nodoka Kuribayashi | TBS | Lead role |
| 2011 | You're Beautiful | Shigeko Sakuraba | TBS | |
| 2012 | Deka Kurokawa Suzuki | Misuzu Tahara | YTV | Episode 11 |

=== Films ===
| Year | Title | Role | Notes |
|---|---|---|---|
| 1989 | Shaso | Mitsue Kanaya | |
| 1989 | Migi Magari no Dandy | Kazuko Nakajima | |
| 1990 | Hong Kong Paradise | Television caster | |
