= Nukisaki Shrine =

Shinto shrine in Tomioka, Gunma Prefecture, Japan

Nukisaki Jinja 貫前神社
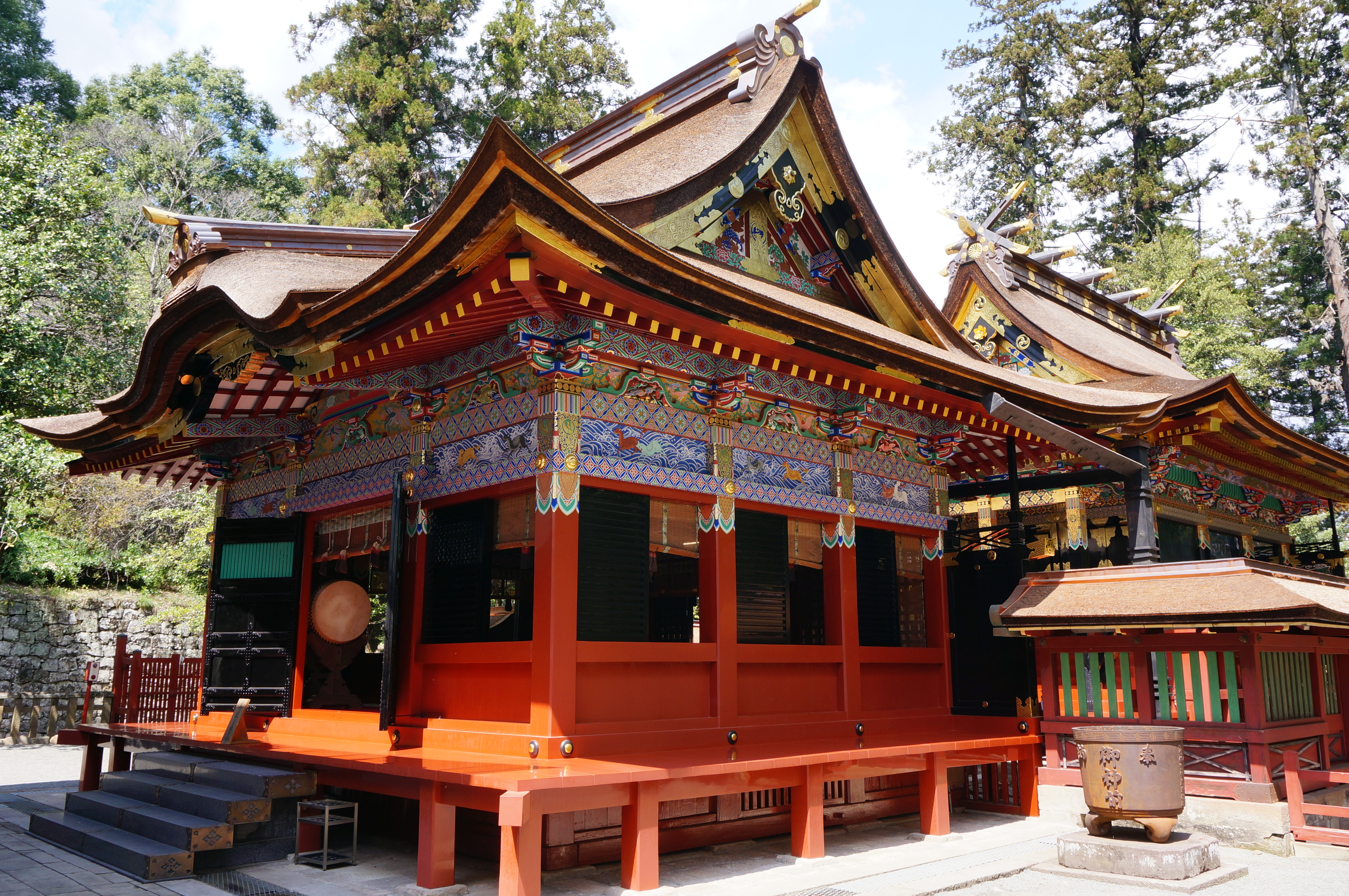
- Haiden of Nukisaki Jinja (ICP)

- Location within Gunma Prefecture Location within Japan

Religion
- Affiliation: Shinto
- Deity: Futsunushi
- Festival: March 15

Location
- Location: 1535 Ichinomiya, Tomioka-shi, Gunma-ken
- Interactive map of Nukisaki Jinja 貫前神社
- Coordinates: 36°15′18.55″N 138°51′27.55″E

Architecture
- Founder: c. Emperor Akan
- Established: c.534

Website
- Official website

Nukisaki Jinja (貫前神社) is a Shinto shrine in the Ichinomiya neighborhood of the city of Tomioka in Gunma Prefecture, Japan. It is the ichinomiya of former Kōzuke Province. The main festival of the shrine is held annually on March 15. It is one of only three shrines in all of Japan where visitors enter from the top and descend downwards into the shrine; the other two are Udo Shrine and Kusakabe Yoshimi Shrine in Miyazaki and Kumamoto Prefectures respectively. Nukisaki Shrine is also featured on the 'yu' card in Jomo Karuta.

== Enshrined kami ==
The kami enshrined at Nukisaki Jinja are:

- Futsunushi-no-kami (経津主神), god of war and tutelary deity of the Mononobe and Fujiwara clans
- Hime-Ōkami (姫大神), goddess of sericulture

== History ==
The Nukisaki Jinja is located on a fluvial terrace on the left bank of the Kabura River in southwestern Gunma Prefecture, facing the main route to Shinano. The origins of Nukisaki Jinja are unknown. Although there is no documentary evidence, the shrine claims that it was founded in the first year of the reign of the legendary Emperor Ankan, or in 534. The shrine first appears in the historical record in 806, and its first mention in national records is an entry in the "Shoku Nihon Kōki" in 839, followed by the Nihon Sandai Jitsuroku in 859. In the 927 Engishiki records it is listed as a myojin taisha (名神大社). Emperor Uda decided to send an imperial messenger to the shrine for a once-in-a-lifetime memorial service in 888, but this did not take-lace until the enthronement of Emperor Ichijō in 1017. It was regarded as the ichinomiya of the province from around 1100. During the Kamakura period and afterwards, the shrine was patronized by the warrior class, including the Minamoto clan, Uesugi clan, Late Hōjō clan and Takeda clan, with the shrine times acting as an intermediary between the warring parties, and receiving donations of estates and for rebuilding in return. The current shrine structures were largely constructed under Shogun Tokugawa Iemitsu and Tokugawa Tsunayoshi in the early Edo Period.

During the Meiji period era of State Shinto, the shrine was designated as a National shrine, 2nd rank (国幣中社, kokuhei-chūsha) under the Modern system of ranked Shinto Shrines.

The shrine is located a 15-minute walk from Jōshū-Ichinomiya Station on the Jōshin Dentetsu Jōshin Line.

== Gallery ==
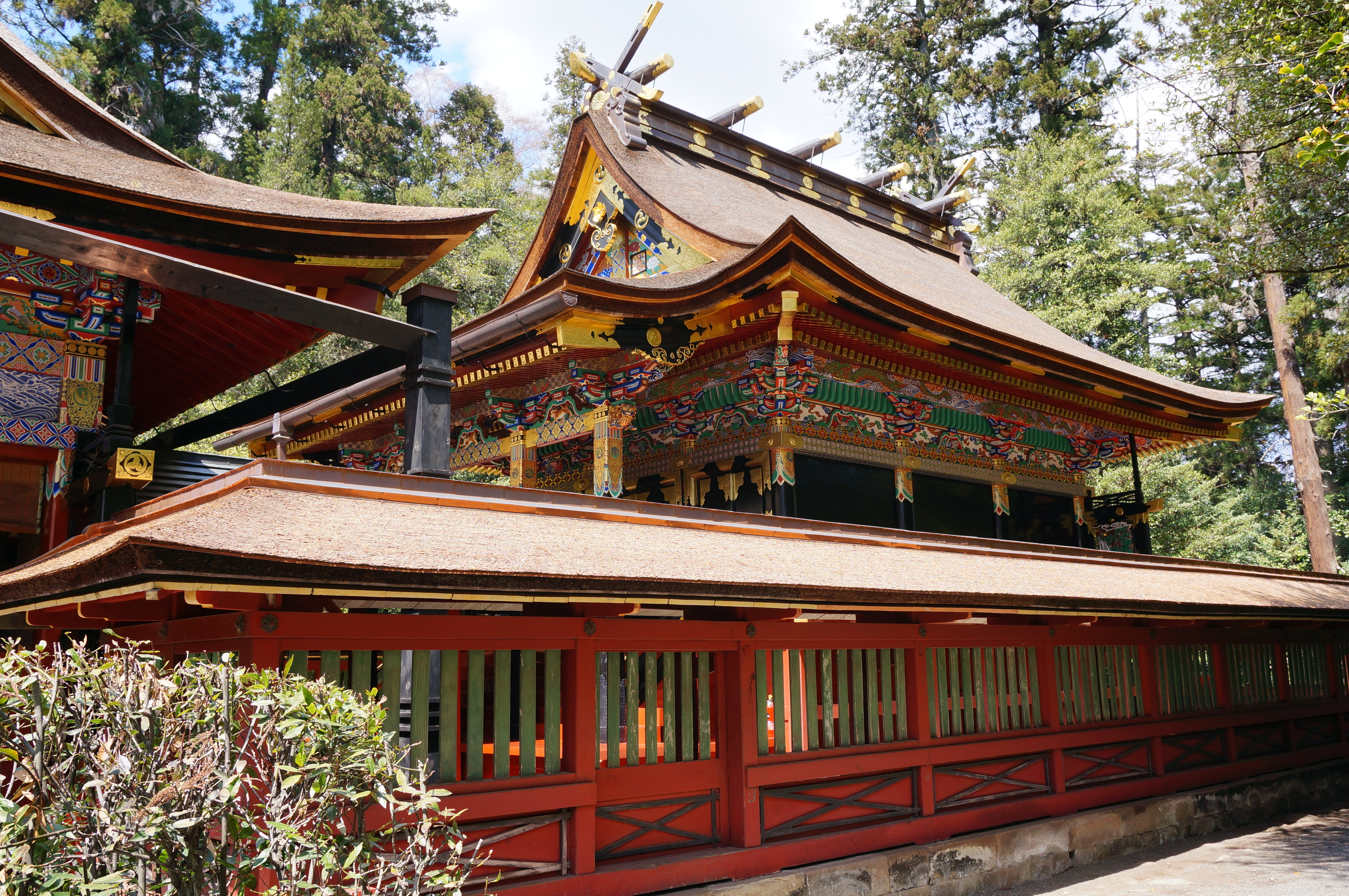
Honden (ICP)

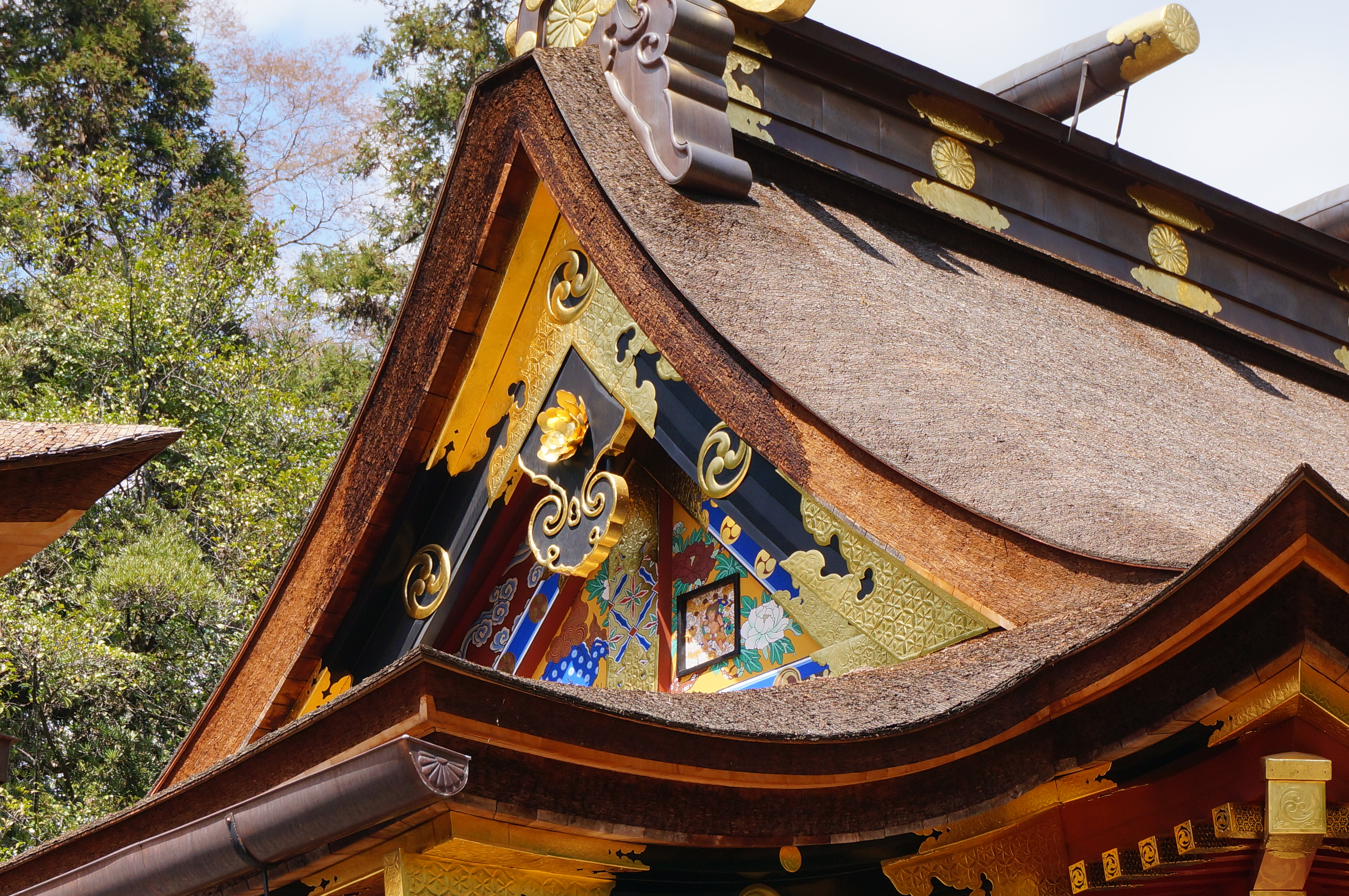
Raijin Komado on the Honden

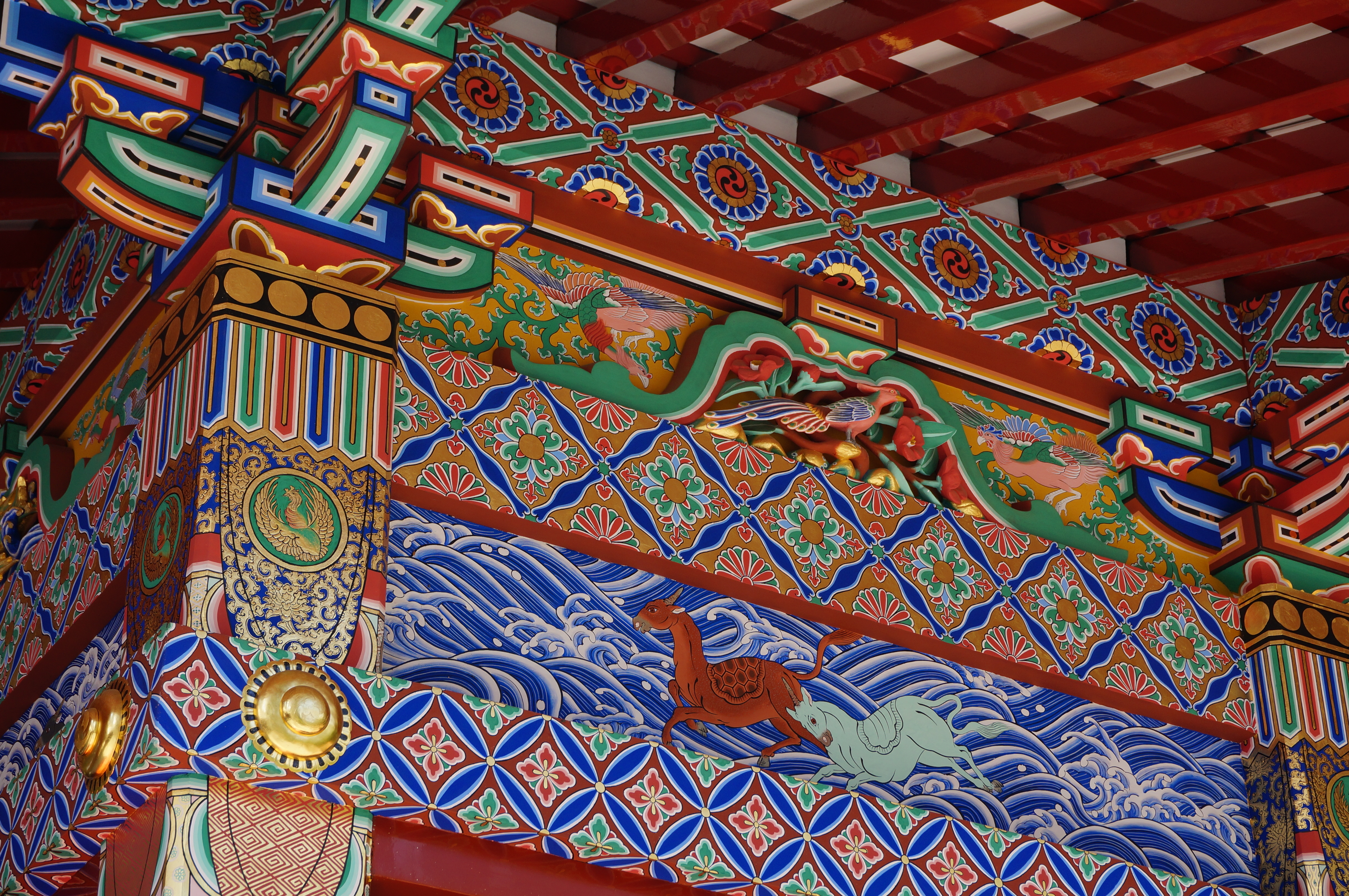
Decorations on the Honden

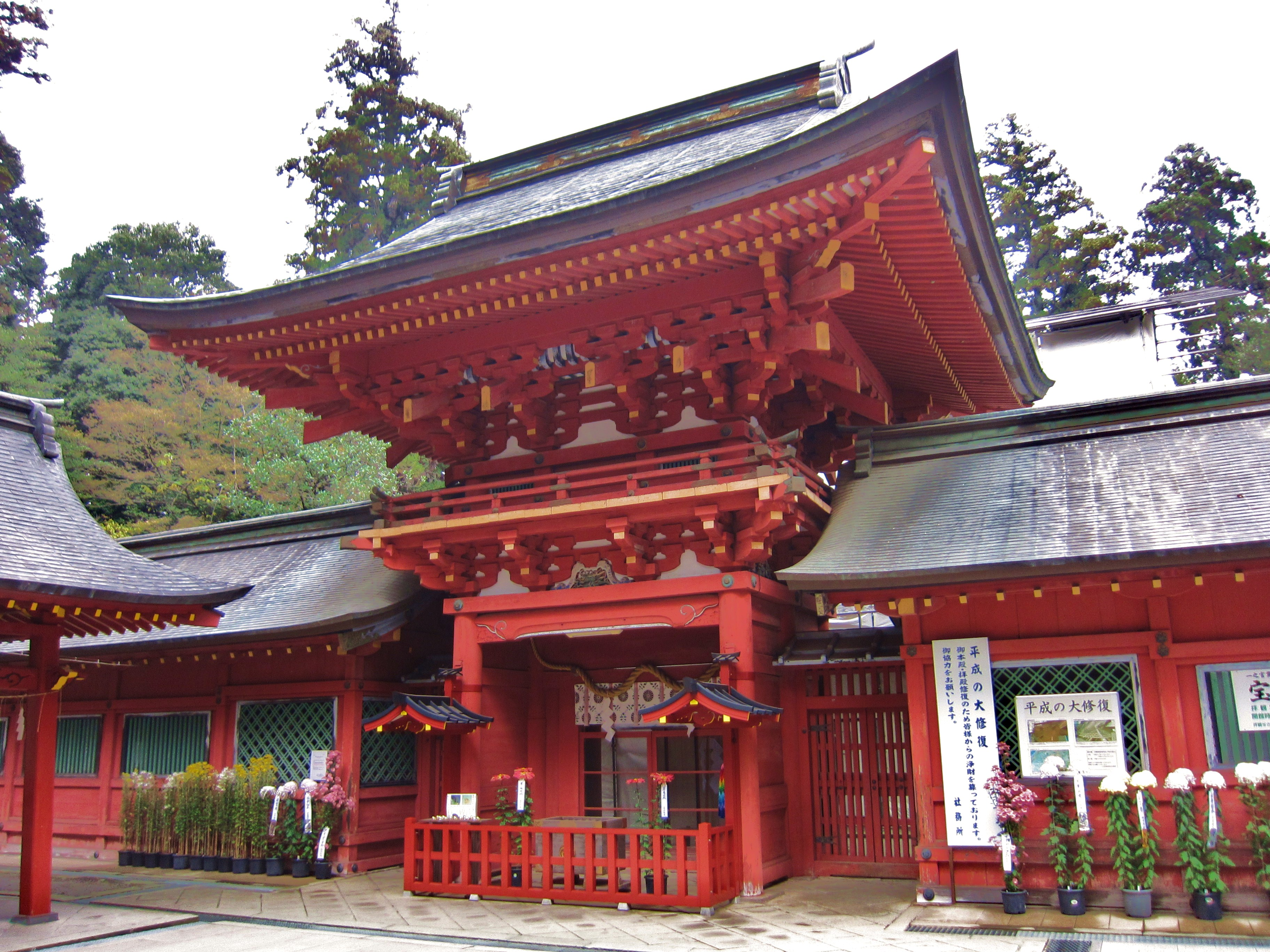
Romon (ICP)

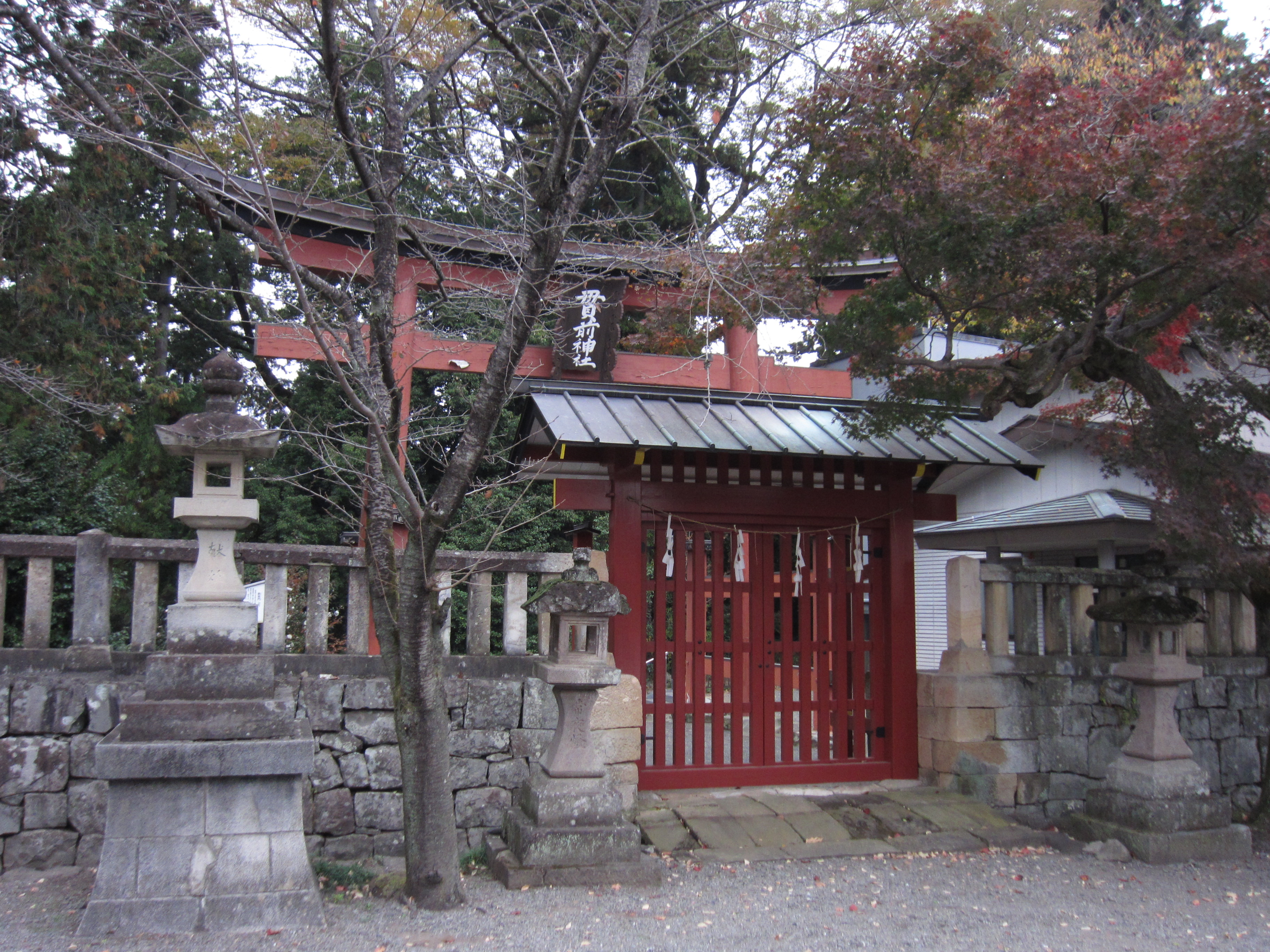
Imperial Messenger Gate

== Cultural Properties ==
=== National Important Cultural Properties ===
- Honden (本殿), Edo period (1635), designated a National Important Cultural Property in 1912.
- Haiden (拝殿), Edo period (1635), designated a National Important Cultural Property in 1976.
- Rōmon (楼門), Edo period (1635), designated a National Important Cultural Property in 1976.
- Cupronickel Mirror (白銅月宮鑑), Tang Dynasty, designated a National Important Cultural Property in 1912.
- Bronzel Mirror (白銅月宮鑑), Kamakura period, set of 2, designated a National Important Cultural Property in 1917.

==== National Important Intangible Folk Cultural Properties ====
- Deer divination customs at Nukisaki Shrine (貫前神社の鹿占習俗), Deer divination is a method of burning a deer's shoulder blade in a specific way and then predicting good or bad fortune by the resulting cracks. It is known to have originated in Japan during the Yayoi period and was particularly popular in ancient times. The deer divination custom was once practiced in various places, but now it is only practiced at Nukisaki Shrine and Musashi Mitake Shrine.

== See also ==
- List of Shinto shrines
- Ichinomiya
