= Jōshū-Nanokaichi Station =

Railway station in Tomioka, Gunma Prefecture, Japan

Jōshū-Nanokaichi Station 上州七日市駅
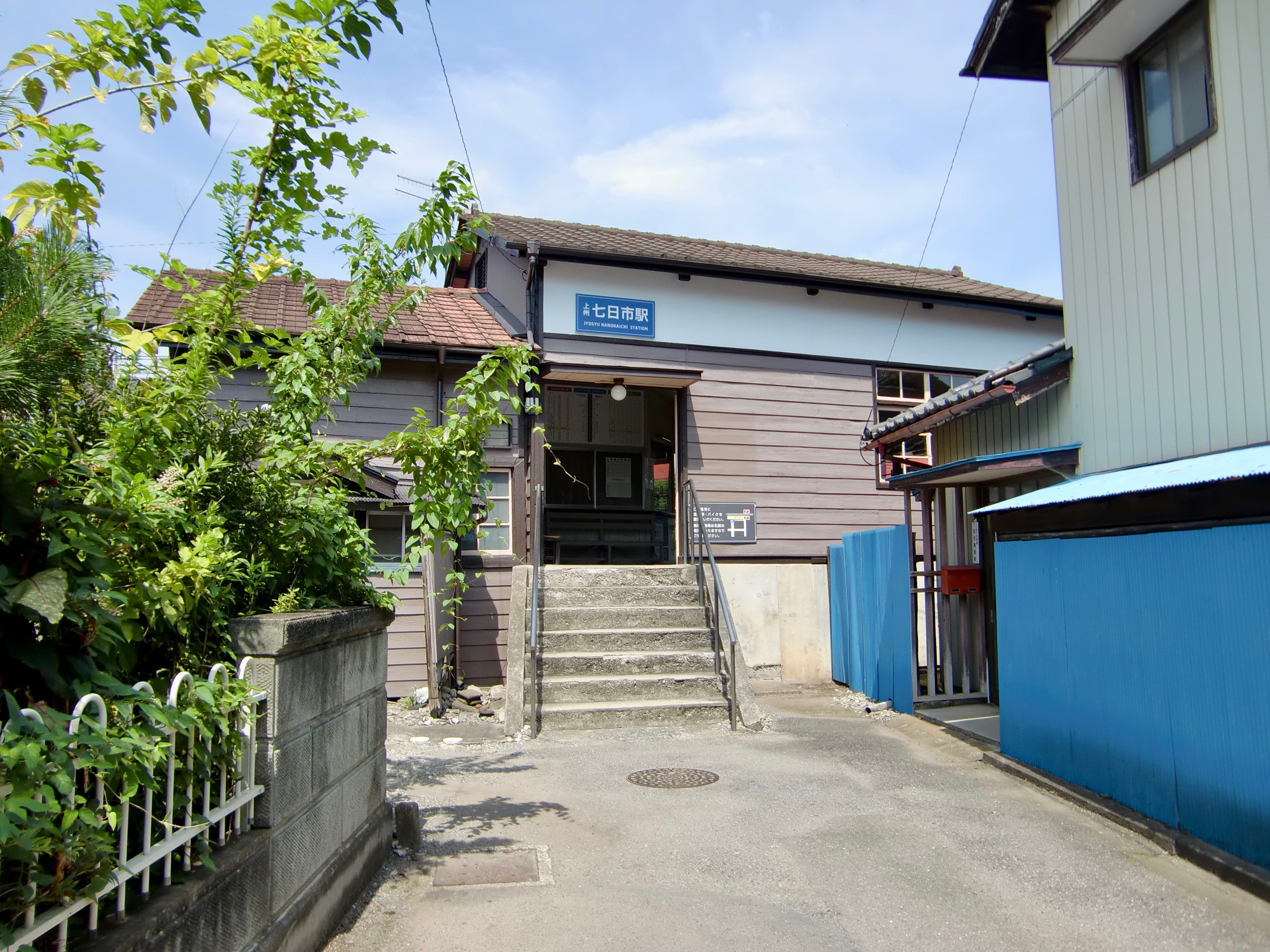
- Jōshū-Nanokaichi Station in August 2013

General information
- Location: Nanokaichi 1625-1, Tomioka-shi, Gunma-ken 370-2343; Japan
- Coordinates: 36°15′30.95″N 138°52′28.82″E
- Operator: Jōshin Dentetsu
- Line: ■ Jōshin Line
- Distance: 29.9 km from Takasaki
- Platforms: 1 side platform

Other information
- Status: Unstaffed
- Website: Official website

History
- Opened: 25 April 1912
- Former names: Nanokaichi (to 1921)

Passengers
- FY2019: 257

Services
Preceding station	Joshin Electric Railway	Following station
Jōshū-Ichinomiya towards Shimonita	Jōshin Line	Nishi-Tomioka towards Takasaki
Location
- Location within Gunma Prefecture Location within Japan

Jōshū-Nankaichi Station (上州七日市駅, Jōshū-Nanokaichi-eki) is a passenger railway station in the city of Tomioka, Gunma, Japan, operated by the private railway operator Jōshin Dentetsu.

== Lines ==
Jōshū-Nanokaichi Station is a station on the Jōshin Line, and is 21.8 kilometers from the terminus of the line at Takasaki.

== Station layout ==
The station consists of a single side platform serving traffic in both directions.

== History ==
Jōshū-Nanokaichi Station opened on 25 April 1912 as Nanokaichi Station (七日市駅, Nanokaichi-eki). It was renamed to its present name on 17 December 1921.

== Surrounding area ==
- National Route 254

== See also ==
- List of railway stations in Japan
