= Tomioka, Gunma =

Tomioka 富岡市
- City
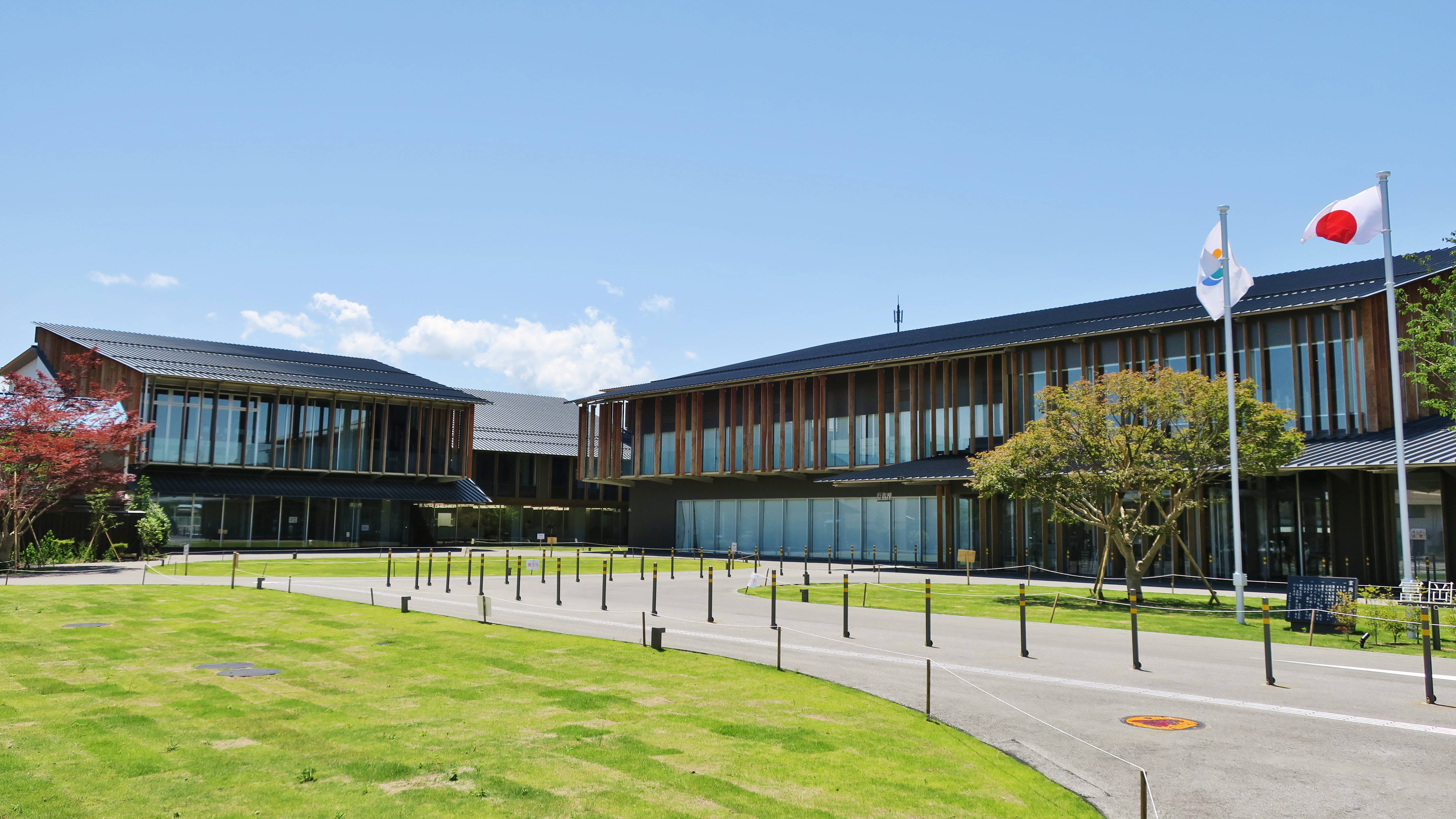
- Tomioka city hall

- Flag Seal

- Location of Tomioka in Gunma Prefecture

- Coordinates: 36°15′35.7″N 138°53′23.7″E
- Country: Japan
- Region: Kantō
- Prefecture: Gunma
- Town settled: April 1, 1889
- City settled: April 1, 1943

Government
  - Mayor: Masahide Mohara (茂原正秀) - from April 2026

Area
  - Total: 122.85 km^{2} (47.43 sq mi)

Population (September 2020)
  - Total: 47,911
  - Density: 390.00/km^{2} (1,010.1/sq mi)
- Time zone: UTC+9 (Japan Standard Time)
- Tree: Maple
- Flower: Sakura
- Bird: Japanese bush-warbler
- Phone number: 0274-62-1511
- Address: 1460-1 Tomioka, Tomioka-shi, Gunma-ken 370-2392
- Website: Official website

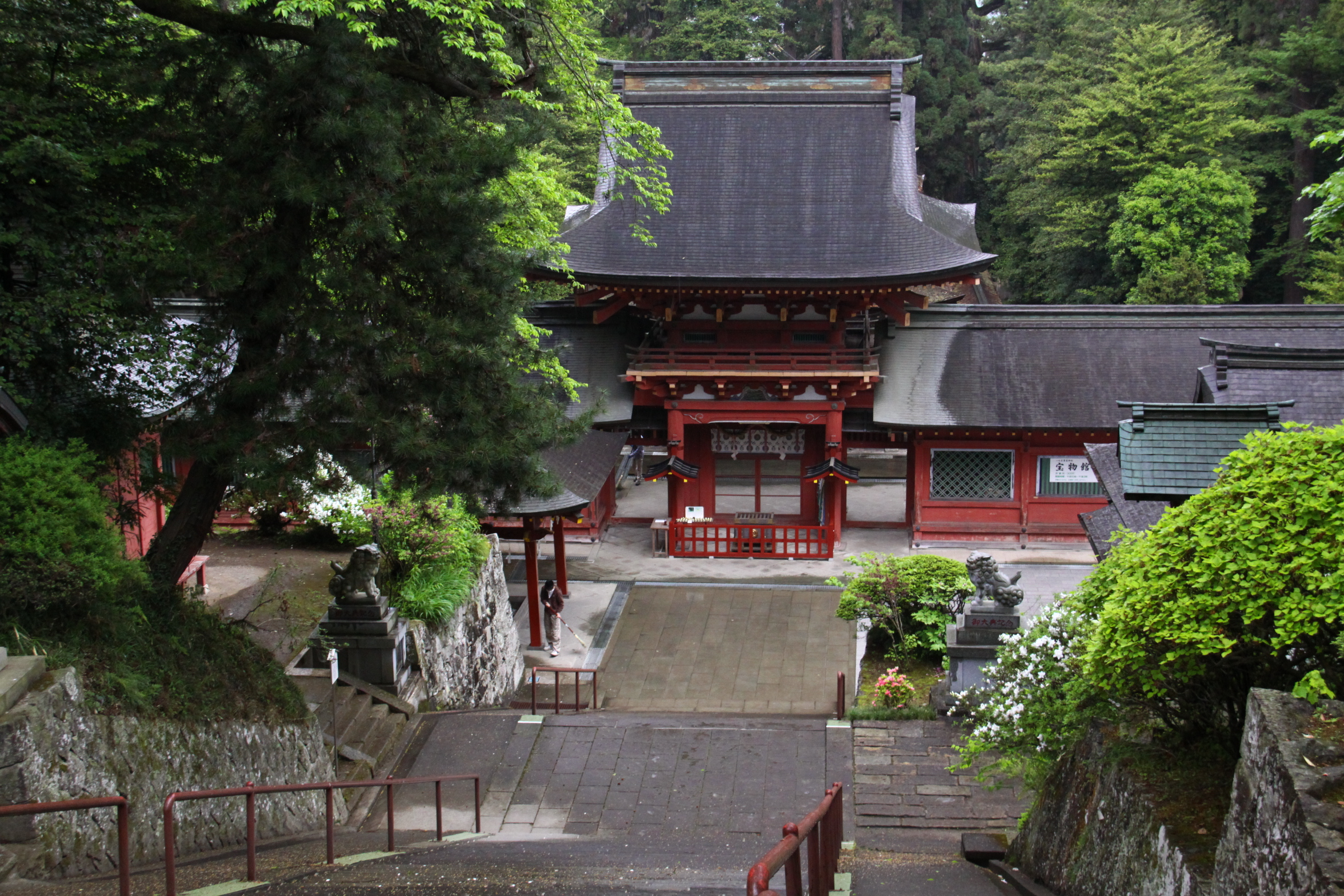
Nukisaki Shrine

Tomioka (富岡市, Tomioka-shi) is a city located in Gunma Prefecture, Japan. As of 1 September 2020, the city had an estimated population of 57,013 in 20,367 households, and a population density of 390 persons per km^{2}. The total area of the city is 122.85 square kilometres (47.43 sq mi). It is the location of the Tomioka Silk Mill, a UNESCO World Heritage Site.

== Geography ==
Tomioka is located in the southwestern portion of Gunma Prefecture.

- Mountains: Mount Myōgi (1103m)
- Rivers: Kabura River
- Lakes: Oshio Dam

=== Surrounding municipalities ===
Gunma Prefecture

- Annaka
- Kanra
- Shimonita
- Takasaki

=== Climate ===
Tomioka has a Humid continental climate (Köppen Cfa) characterized by warm summers and cold winters with heavy snowfall. The average annual temperature in Tomioka is 13.8 °C. The average annual rainfall is 1207 mm with September as the wettest month. The temperatures are highest on average in August, at around 26.1 °C, and lowest in January, at around 2.4 °C.

== Demographics ==
Per Japanese census data, the population of Tomioka has remained relatively steady over the past 60 years.

Historical population
Year	Pop.	±%
1960	50,971	—
1970	50,784	−0.4%
1980	53,200	+4.8%
1990	54,259	+2.0%
2000	54,401	+0.3%
2010	52,070	−4.3%
2020	47,446	−8.9%

== History ==
Tomioka is located within traditional Kōzuke Province. During the Edo period, the area of present-day Tomioka was part of the tenryō territory under the direct control of the Tokugawa shogunate. It became Tomioka Town within Kitakanra District, Gunma Prefecture on April 1, 1889 with the creation of the modern municipalities system after the Meiji Restoration. In 1950 Kitakanra District was renamed Kanra District. On April 1, 1954, Tomioka annexed the neighboring town of Ichinomiya, and the villages of Ono, Kuroiwa, Takase, and Nukabe, and was raised to city status on November 1, 1958. On April 1, 1960 the village of Nyuu was incorporated into Tomioka. On March 27, 2006 Tomioka absorbed the neighboring town of Myōgi.

== Government ==
Tomioka has a mayor-council form of government with a directly elected mayor and a unicameral city council of 18 members. Tomioka contributes one member to the Gunma Prefectural Assembly. In terms of national politics, the city is part of Gunma 5th district of the lower house of the Diet of Japan.

== Economy ==
- MannanLife, manufacturer of konnyaku jelly, is headquartered in Tomioka.

== Education ==
Tomioka has 11 public elementary schools and six public middle schools operated by the city government, and two public high schools operated by the Gunma Prefectural Board of Education. The prefecture also operates two special education schools for the handicapped.

== Transportation ==
=== Railway ===
Jōshin Dentetsu - Jōshin Line

- Higashi-Tomioka - Jōshū-Tomioka - Nishi-Tomioka - Jōshū-Nanokaichi - Jōshū-Ichinomiya - Kanohara - Nanjai - Sendaira

=== Highway ===
- Jōshin-etsu Expressway – Tomioka IC
- National Route 254

== Local attractions ==
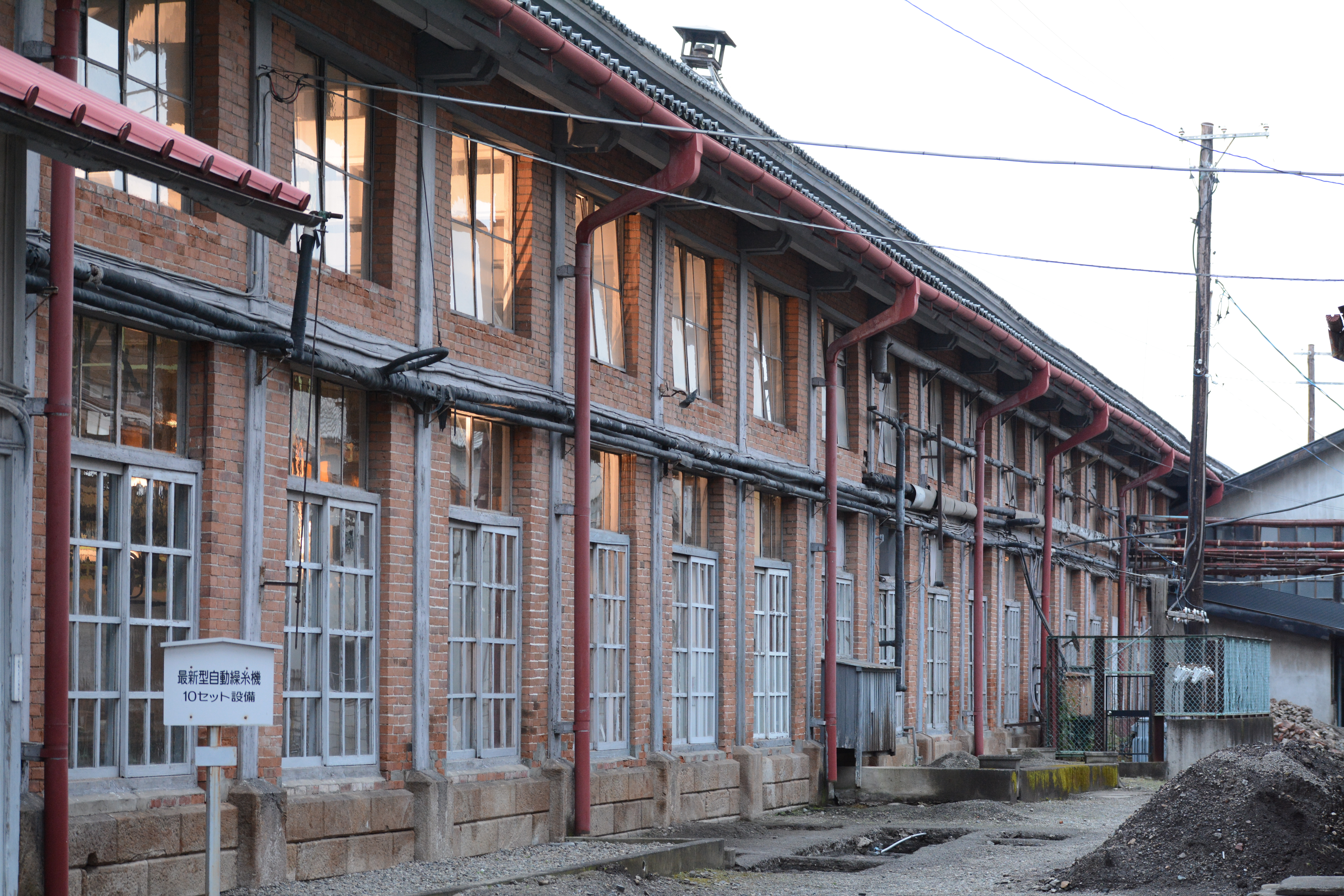
Japan's first modern silk reeling factory at Tomioka, a UNESCO World Heritage Site

- Gunma Safari Park was the fifth safari park built in Japan and the first built in eastern Japan. The park's approximate 1000 animals consist of around 100 species.
- Nakatakase Kannonyama Site, Yayoi period settlement trace, a National Historic Site
- Nukisaki Shrine, the ichinomiya of former Kōzuke Province. During the New Year, an estimated 100,000 people visit the shrine to pray for happiness in the year ahead. This is the largest gathering of its kind in Gunma.
- Tomioka Museum of Natural History houses 35 exhibits on Gunma's natural history, including about 30 dinosaur skeletons.
- Tomioka Silk Mill, or Tomioka Silk Factory (富岡製糸工場), built in 1872, was the first of its kind in Japan. The world-heritage brick building was designed by Paul Brunat, a French engineer. It was designated a World Heritage Site in 2014.

== Noted people from Tomioka ==
- Tsuruko Haraguchi, psychologist
- Mayu Kōma, singer (tripleS)
- Masanobu Takayanagi, cinematographer
- Eijirō Tōno, actor

== International relations ==
- Albany, Western Australia, Australia, friendship city
