= Jōshū-Ichinomiya Station =

Railway station in Tomioka, Gunma Prefecture, Japan

Jōshū-Ichinomiya Station 上州一ノ宮駅
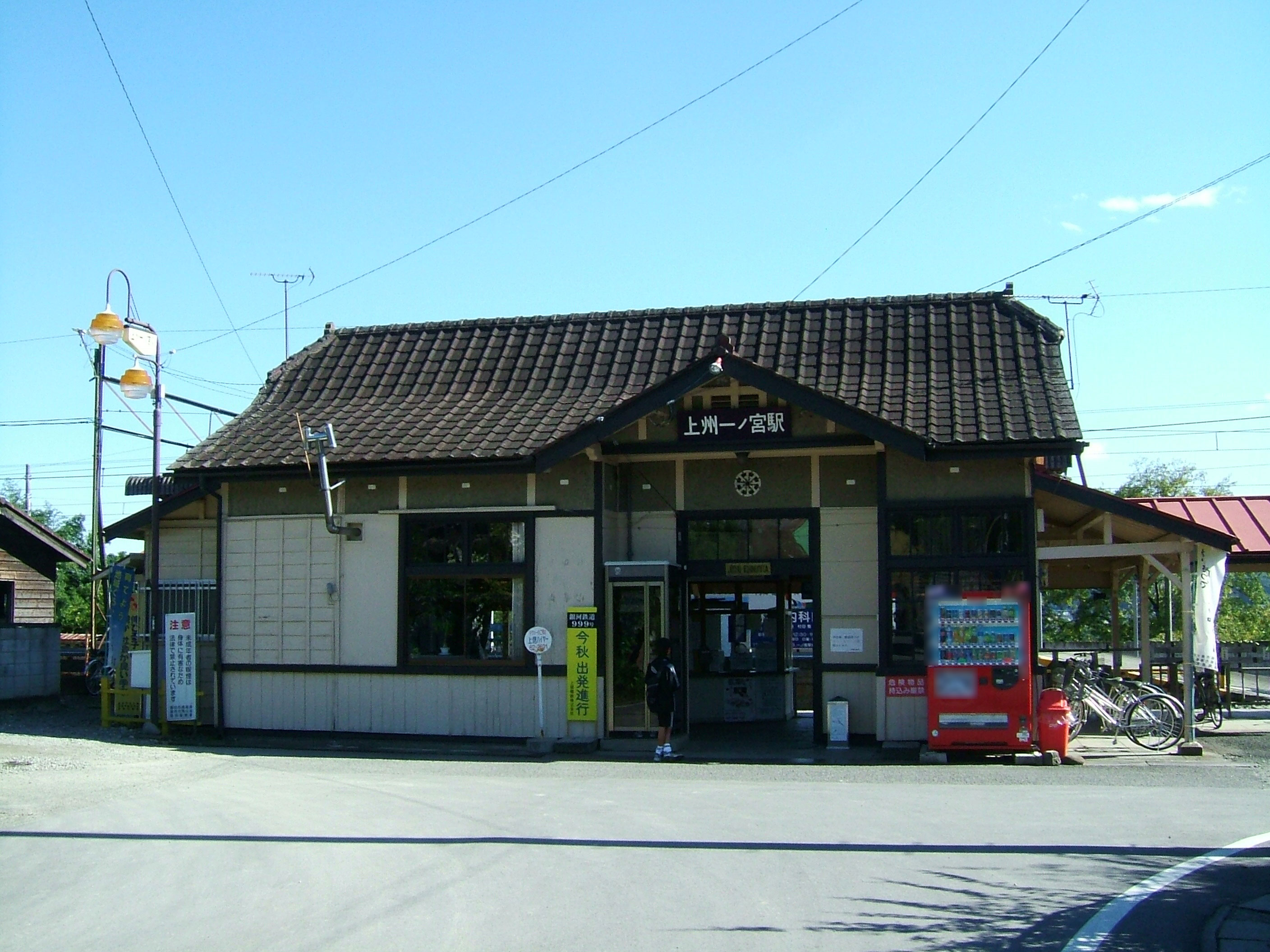
- Jōshū-Ichinomiya Station, October 2006

General information
- Location: Ichinomiya 226-2, Tomioka-shi, Gunma-ken 370-2452; Japan
- Coordinates: 36°15′11.11″N 138°51′49.5″E
- Operator: Jōshin Dentetsu
- Line: ■ Jōshin Line
- Distance: 23.1 km from Takasaki
- Platforms: 1 island platform

Other information
- Status: Unstaffed
- Website: Official website

History
- Opened: 2 July 1897
- Former names: Ichinomiya (to 1921)

Passengers
- FY2019: 188

Services
Preceding station	Joshin Electric Railway	Following station
Kanohara towards Shimonita	Jōshin Line	Jōshū-Nanokaichi towards Takasaki
Location
- Location within Gunma Prefecture Location within Japan

Jōshū-Ichinomiya Station (上州一ノ宮駅, Jōshū-Ichinomiya-eki) is a passenger railway station in the city of Tomioka, Gunma, Japan, operated by the private railway operator Jōshin Dentetsu.

== Lines ==
Jōshū-Ichinomiya Station is a station on the Jōshin Line and is 23.1 kilometers from the terminus of the line at Takasaki.

== Station layout ==
The station consists of a single island platform connected to the station building by a level crossing.

=== Platforms ===
1	■ Jōshin Line	for Takasaki
2	■ Jōshin Line	for Shimonita

== History ==
Jōshū-Ichinomiya Station opened on 2 July 1897 as Ichinomiya Station (一ノ宮駅, Ichinomiya-eki). It was renamed to its present name on 17 December 1921.

== Surrounding area ==
- National Route 254
- Ichinomiya Post Office
- Ichinomiya Nukisaki Jinja

== See also ==
- List of railway stations in Japan
