= Nishi-Tomioka Station =

Railway station in Tomioka, Gunma Prefecture, Japan

Nishi-Tomioka Station 西富岡駅
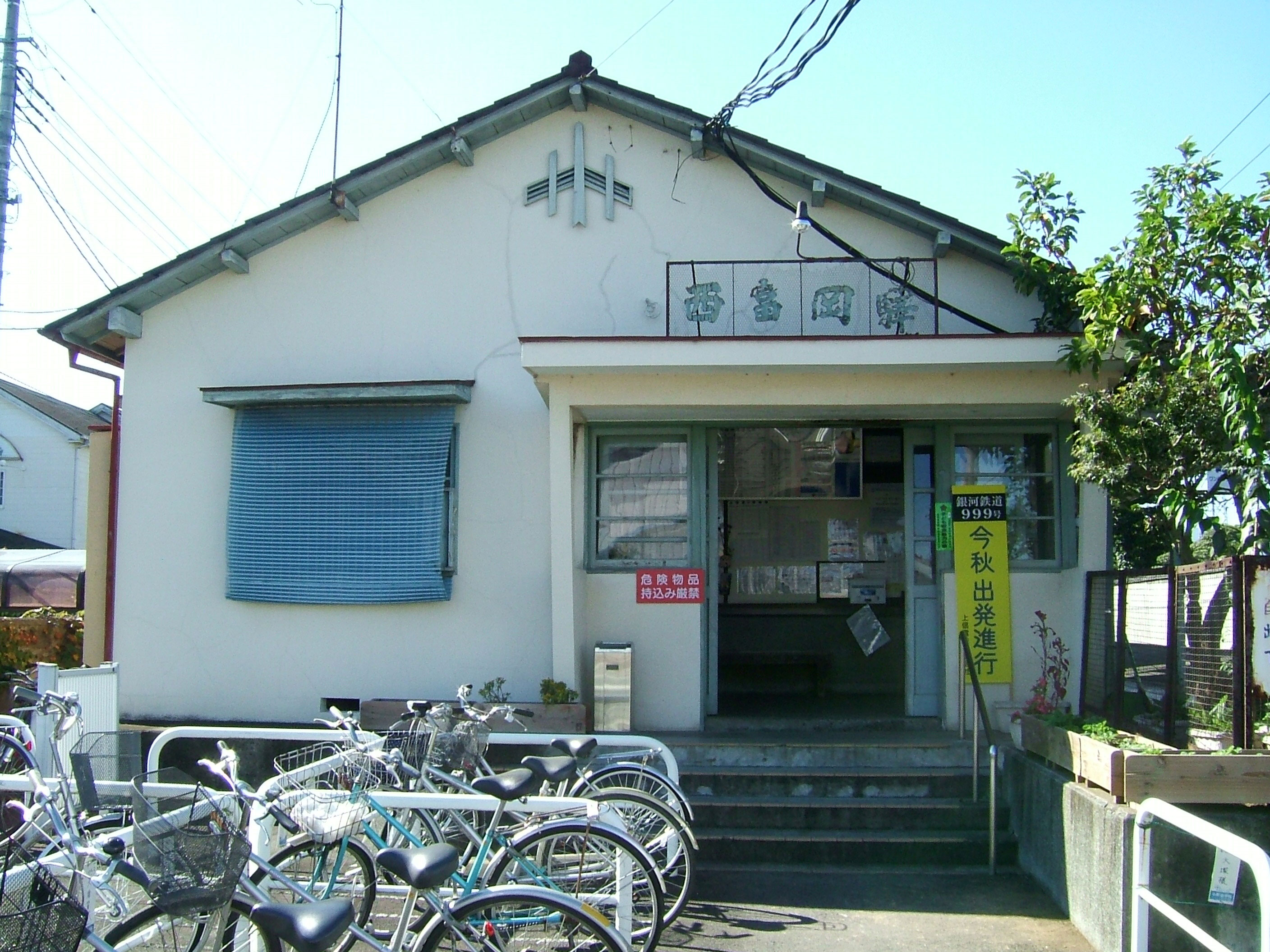
- Nishi-Tomioka Station, October 2008

General information
- Location: Nanokaichi 671-8, Tomioka-shi, Gunma-ken 370-2343; Japan
- Coordinates: 36°15′36.44″N 138°52′59.51″E
- Operator: Jōshin Dentetsu
- Line: ■ Jōshin Line
- Distance: 21.0 km from Takasaki
- Platforms: 1 side platform

Other information
- Status: Unstaffed
- Website: Official website

History
- Opened: 15 October 1937
- Closed: 1951-1953
- Former names: Byōinmae (to 1951)

Passengers
- FY2019: 153

Services
Preceding station	Joshin Electric Railway	Following station
Jōshū-Nanokaichi towards Shimonita	Jōshin Line	Jōshū-Tomioka towards Takasaki
Location
- Location within Gunma Prefecture Location within Japan

Nishi-Tomioka Station (西富岡駅, Nishi-Tomioka-eki) is a passenger railway station in the city of Tomioka, Gunma, Japan, operated by the private railway operator Jōshin Dentetsu.

== Lines ==
Nishi-Tomioka Station is a station on the Jōshin Line and is 21.0 kilometers from the terminus of the line at Takasaki.

== Station layout ==
The station consists of one side platform serving traffic in both directions.

== History ==
Nishi-Tomioka Station opened on 15 October 1937 as Byōinmae Station (病院前駅, Byōinmae-eki). Operations were suspended from 1 September 1951 to 15 January 1953, when the station reopened under its present name. The current station building was completed in 1968.

== Surrounding area ==
- National Route 254
- Tomioka Nanokaichi Post Office
- Nanokaichi Hospital

== See also ==
- List of railway stations in Japan
