= Nanmoku, Gunma =

Nanmoku 南牧村 (Japanese)
- Village

Japanese transcription(s)
  - Rōmaji: Nanmoku-mura
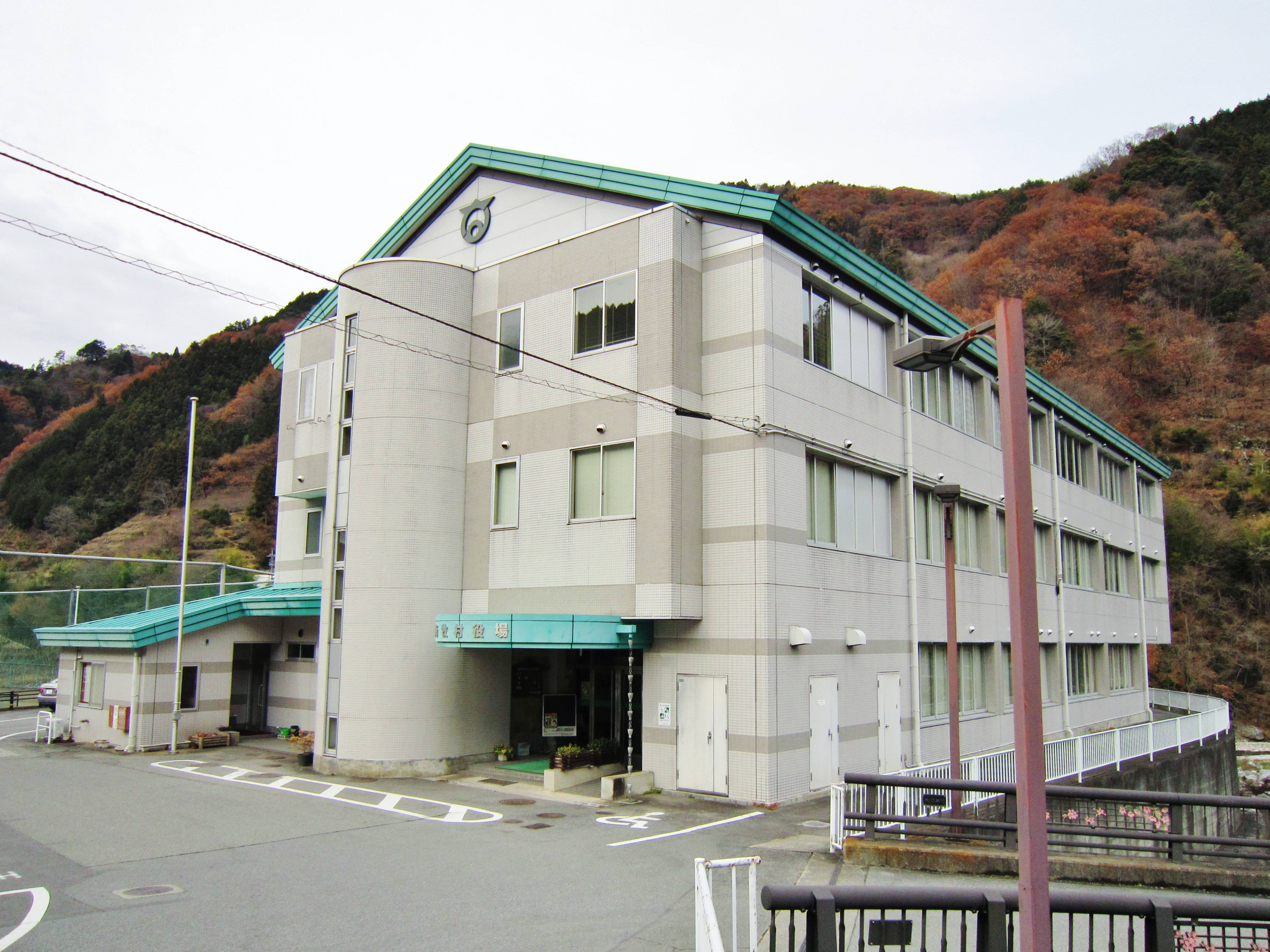
- Nanmoku village office

- Flag Seal

- Location of Nanmoku in Gunma Prefecture

- Coordinates: 36°9′30.6″N 138°42′41.2″E
- Country: Japan
- Region: Kantō
- Prefecture: Gunma
- District: Kanra

Area
  - Total: 118.83 km^{2} (45.88 sq mi)

Population (2026-09-30)
  - Total: 1,325
  - Density: 11.15/km^{2} (28.88/sq mi)
- Time zone: UTC+9 (Japan Standard Time)
- Symbols
  - Tree: Cryptomeria
  - Bird: Japanese bush-warbler
- Phone number: 0274-87-2111
- Address: 1089 Dainichimukai, Namoku-mura, Kanra-gun, Gunma-ken 370-2601
- Website: Official website

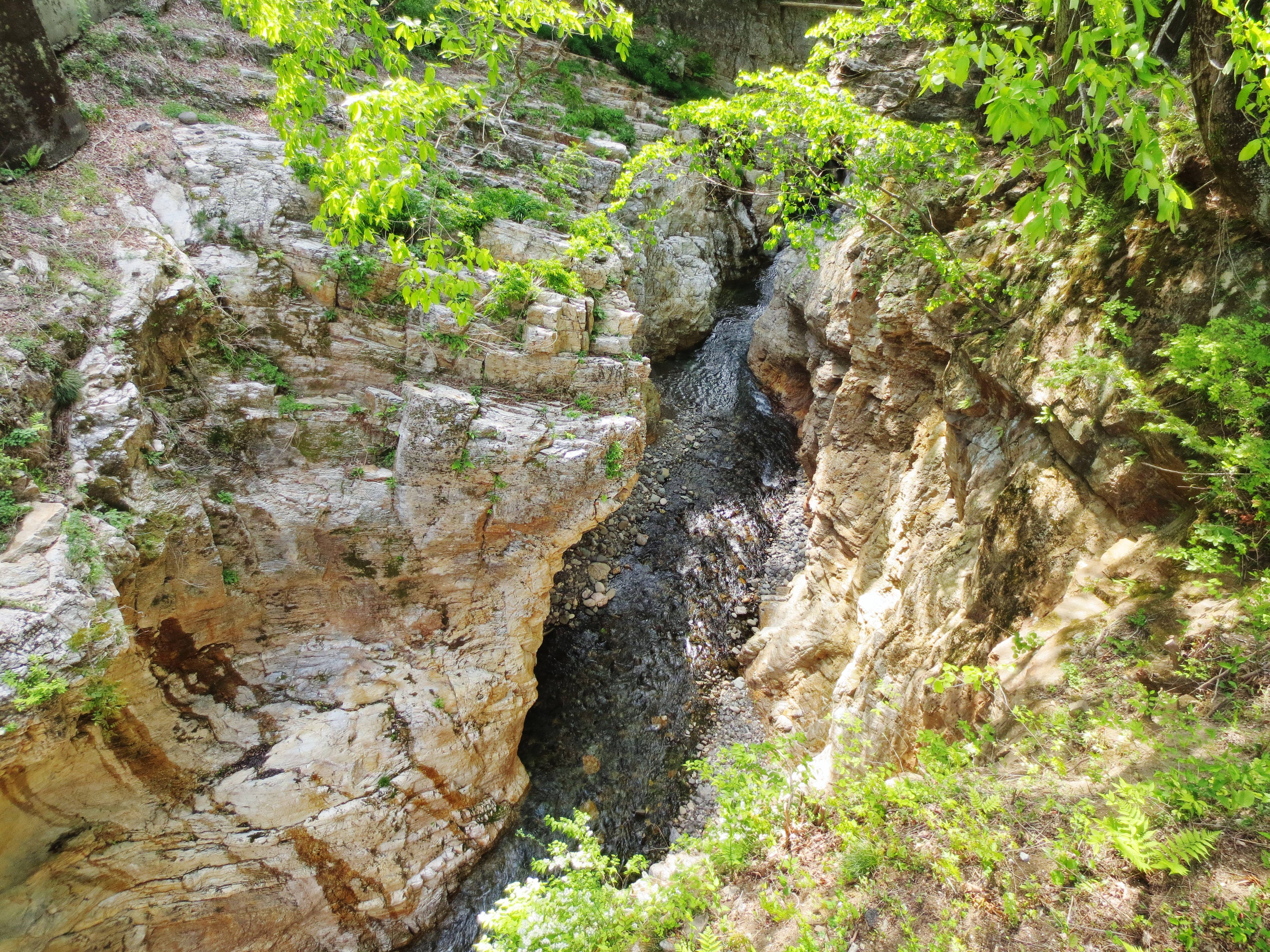
Semi Valley ravine

Nanmoku (南牧村, Nanmoku-mura) is a village located in Gunma Prefecture, Japan. As of 30 September 2026, the village has an estimated population of 1,325 in 819 households, and a population density of 11 persons per km^{2}. The total area of the village is 118.83 square kilometres (45.88 sq mi).

Nanmoku, like many rural areas in Japan, has witnessed significant population decline since the mid-20th century. As of 2023, 67.5% of the population was over age 65 and the median age was 68.4, making Nanmoku the grayest village in Japan.

== History ==
During the Edo period, the area of present-day Nanmoku was largely part of the tenryō territory held directly by Tokugawa shogunate within Kōzuke Province. The area was divided into villages with the establishment of the modern municipalities system on April 1, 1889. The village of Nanmoku was created on March 15, 1955, by the merger of the villages of Iwado, Tsukigata and Ozawa.

== Geography ==
Nanmoku is located in southwestern Gunma Prefecture bordering on Nagano Prefecture to the west. Part of the village is within the borders of the Myōgi-Arafune-Saku Kōgen Quasi-National Park.

- Mountains:
  - Mount Arafune (1423 m)
  - Mount Hikage (1407 m)
  - Mount Ōya (1081 m)
  - Eboshidake (1182 m)
  - Mount Kurotaki (870 m)
  - Mount Yotsumata (900 m)
  - Tateiwa (1265 m)
- Rivers:
  - Kumakura River
  - Nanmoku River
  - Ōnita River
  - Ōshiozawa River

=== Surrounding municipalities ===
Gunma Prefecture

- Kanna
- Shimonita
- Ueno

Nagano Prefecture

- Saku
- Sakuho

=== Climate ===
Nanmoku has a humid continental climate (Köppen Cfa) characterized by warm summers and cold winters with heavy snowfall. The average annual temperature in Nanmoku is 11.0 °C. The average annual rainfall is 1127 mm with September as the wettest month. The temperatures are highest on average in August, at around 24.0 °C, and lowest in January, at around -1.3 °C.

== Demographics ==
As of the 2025 census, the population is 1,260, of which 47.5% are male, and 52.5% are female. Minors make up 3.2% of the population, and seniors make up 68.9%, making Nanmoku the demographically oldest village in Japan. Foreigners make up 0.7% of the population.

Historical population

Year	Pop.	±% p.a.
1940	9,632	—
1950	10,892	+1.24%
1955	10,573	−0.59%
1960	9,602	−1.91%
1965	8,715	−1.92%
1970	7,671	−2.52%
1975	6,856	−2.22%
1980	5,893	−2.98%
1985	5,089	−2.89%

Year	Pop.	±% p.a.
1990	4,387	−2.93%
1995	3,829	−2.68%
2000	3,340	−2.70%
2005	2,929	−2.59%
2010	2,423	−3.72%
2015	1,979	−3.97%
2020	1,611	−4.03%
2025	1,260	−4.80%

Source: Statistics Bureau of Japan

== Government ==
Nanmoku has a mayor-council form of government with a directly elected mayor and a unicameral village council of eight members. Nanmoku, together with the other municipalities in Kanra District contributes one member to the Gunma Prefectural Assembly. In terms of national politics, the town is part of Gunma 5th district of the lower house of the Diet of Japan.

== Economy ==
During the postwar decades Nanmoku had a thriving economy anchored by sericulture, konjac cultivation and forestry. However, by the late 20th century konjac production had relocated to more economical areas while Nanomku's silk and forest products struggled to compete with cheap foreign imports. The lack of economic opportunity accelerated Nanmoku's population decline, further weakening the economy. In the present day, economic activity in Nanmoku is centered around services and small-scale agriculture.

== Education ==
Nanmoku has a nursery school, compulsory school operated by the village government. The village does not have a high school.

== Transportation ==
=== Railway ===
Nanmoku is not served by any passenger railway service. The nearest train station is Shimonita Station in the neighboring town of Shimonita.

=== Highway ===
Nanmoku is not served by any national highways.

== Local attractions ==
Nanmoku is popular locally for its scenery. The village is located in the valley of a small mountain range, where there are excellent hiking opportunities. One of the mountains, Mt. Arahune, is home to a park with a campsite, including a large multipurpose recreational area that has tennis, water sports, and fishing facilities. There is also an astronomy center located on the grounds. Nanmoku also has a museum that documents local culture and history.

=== Hitoboshi ===
Nanmoku's fire-spinning festival, hitoboshi.

The village is particularly famous for hitoboshi (火とぼし), the two-day local fire festival, the largest in the prefecture. Many people who have moved away but still have family in the village return for this festival, and it is popular with tourists as well. Though such fire festivals were once popular, few remain. Nanmoku's version falls on August 14 and 15, and coincides with Obon, a festival honoring ancestors. However, Hitoboshi itself commemorates the village's victorious alliance with the Takeda clan during the Sengoku period. During the festival, villagers take turns standing on a bridge and twirling burning bales of hay over the edge.
