= Myōgi, Gunma =

Dissolved municipality in Gunma prefecture, Japan

Myōgi (妙義町, Myōgi-machi) was a town located in Kanra District, Gunma Prefecture, Japan.

On March 27, 2006, Myōgi was merged into the expanded city of Tomioka.

In 2003, the town had an estimated population of 4,901 and a density of 170.41 persons per km^{2}. The total area was 28.76 km^{2}.

== See also ==
- Mount Myōgi
