= Osaka, Gunma =

Dissolved municipality in Gunma prefecture, Japan

Osaka (小坂村, Osaka-mura) is a dissolved village once belonging to the Kanra District in the south-western portion of Gunma Prefecture. It presently corresponds to Osaka region in Shimonita.

== Geography ==
- Rivers: Kabura River, Osaka River

== History ==
- April 1, 1889: Kami Osaka, Naka Osaka, Shimo Osaka, and Higashino merge into Kita-Kanra District, Sakamaki (坂牧村, sakamaki mura).
- April, 1890: Sakamaki is renamed to Osaka.
- April 1, 1950: Kita-Kanra District is renamed to Kanra District.
- March 10, 1955: Shimonita, Saimoku, Aokura, and Mayama are abolished and replaced by a new Shimonita.
