= Mount Myōgi =

Major mountain in Gunma Prefecture, Japan

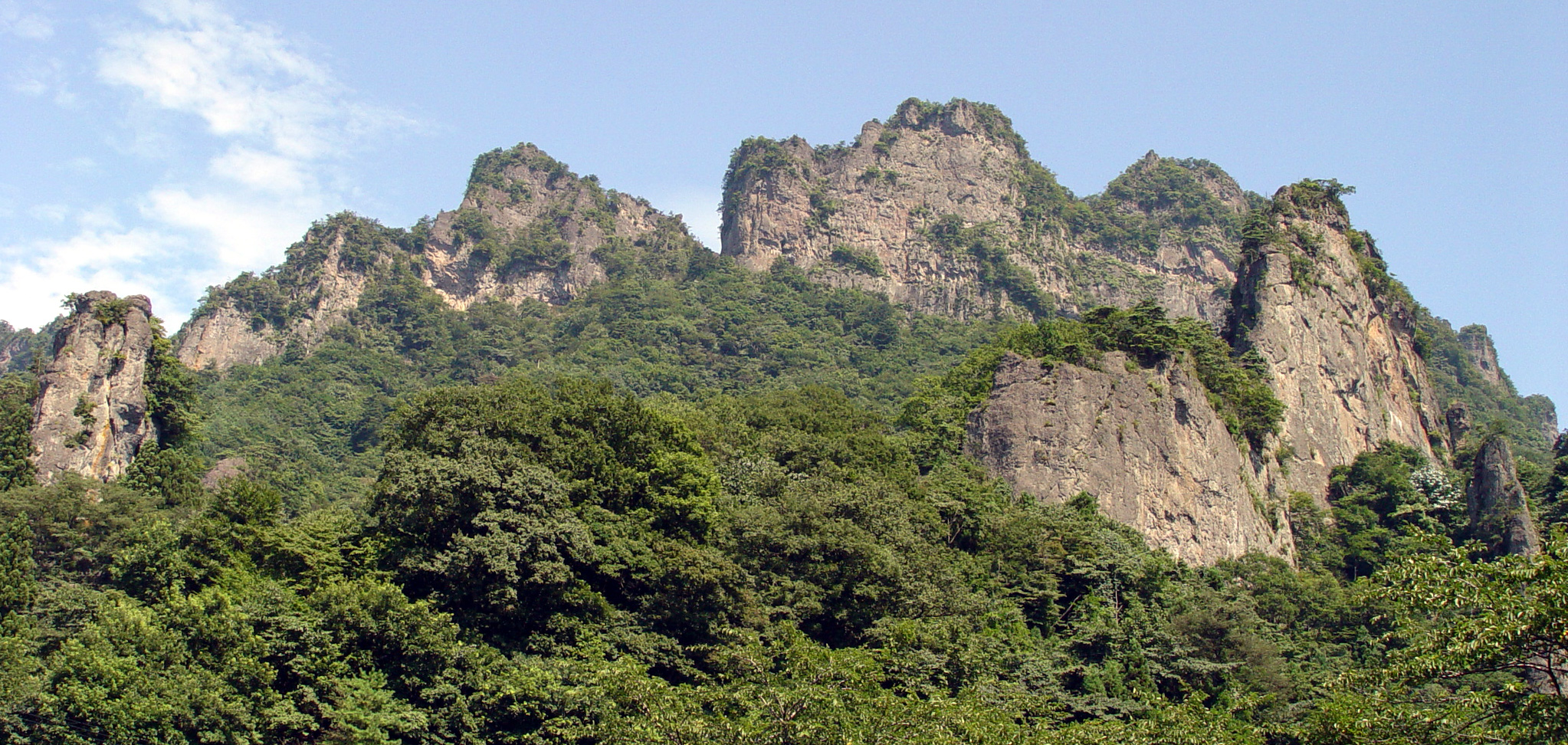
- Mount Myōgi in the summer

Highest point
- Elevation: 1,104 m (3,622 ft)
- Listing: Mountains of Japan
- Coordinates: 36°17′55″N 138°44′56″E

Geography
- Location within Gunma Prefecture Location within Japan
- Country: Japan
- Region: Kantō
- Prefecture: Gunma
- National Place of Scenic Beauty

Mount Myōgi (妙義山, Myōgi-san) is one of the major mountains in Gunma Prefecture, Japan. Its straddles the border between the municipalities of Annaka, Shimonita and Tomioka. Known for its steep, rocky formations, Mount Myōgi is considered one of Japan's three most noted rugged, scenic locations. The area includes many hiking routes, and the scene attracts visitors during the autumn foliage season. The highest point is the peak of the Mt. Sōmadake (相馬岳) reaching 1,104 metres (3,622 ft). It is also a National Place of Scenic Beauty as determined by the Agency for Cultural Affairs in Japan in 1923.

Mount Myōgi, along with Mount Akagi and Mount Haruna, is one of the "Three Mountains of Jōmō". (Jōmō is an old name for Gunma.). It is also featured on the 'mo' card in Jomo Karuta.

== Overview ==
Mount Myōgi is composed of many different peaks: Hakuun-zan (白雲山), Kondō-san (金洞山), Kinkei-san (金鶏山), Sōma-dake (相馬岳), Mitake-san (御岳山), Chōsunokashira (丁須ノ頭), Yakyu-san (谷急山) and others. Mount Myōgi is generally separated in its south side (known as the front side) and its north side (known as the back side). For instance, when looking at Kinkei-san from Shimonita, the mount is referred to as Nakano-take (中之嶽). Among the many peaks of Mount Myōgi, which is already considered having a picturesque form, the landscape of Nakano-take is very particular. Along the slope of the mountain, there is a group of rocks with unique names (ロウソク岩 "candle rock", 大砲岩 "cannon rock", 筆頭岩 "head of the family rock", ユルギ岩 "shaky rock", 虚無僧岩 "nihilist monk rock") that make it praised as one of the most beautiful mountains over Japan. The starting point of the hiking course going through those rocks is Nakano-dake shrine (中之嶽神社). The most famous temple of the divine mountain, Myōgi Shrine (妙義神社), is located on Hakuun-zan, on the east slope of Mount Myōgi. During Edo period, people thought that the god of the mountain protected the population from fire and lightnings. Mount Fuji is located south of Mount Myōgi.

Mount Myōgi is made out of volcanic rocks (dacite, tuff) and conglomerates. It was formed 3 million years ago, at the same time as Mount Arafune located south-west, after a volcanic caldera. Later, the soft sedimentary layer is thought to have been eroded which gave the mountain its current rugged appearance. Mount Myōgi is designated as one of Japan's Three Great Rare Scenic Beauties and was selected as one of the 100 Landscapes of Japan.

== Hiking ==
The rugged landscape has resulted in many severe accidents and deaths. As a consequence, Tomioka city introduced courses for beginners, intermediates and experienced hikers. In January 2010, Gunma prefecture officials, local authorities, the police, firemen and the hiking club discussed the issue during the "Meeting for the establishment of preventive measures to avoid accidents in Mount Myogi and surrounding mountains". The proposition of the officials to forbid hiking was rejected by the locals who wished to continue hiking. Finally, all participants agreed to increase the number of chains and to improve the quality of the routes.

== Use of the name "Myōgi" in the prefecture ==
- During sport festivals, many primary schools of the prefecture name their teams "Team Myogi", "Team Haruna" or "Team Asama"
- The three dormitories of Tomioka Silk Mill, registered as a UNESCO World Heritage since 2014, are also named "Myogi Dormitory", "Haruna Dormitory" and "Asama Dormitory"

== In popular culture ==
Mount Myōgi is mentioned in the street racing manga, video game, and anime series Initial D. It is the home course of the racing team called the Myogi Night Kids, and is the setting for four races in the anime and manga.

== Gallery ==
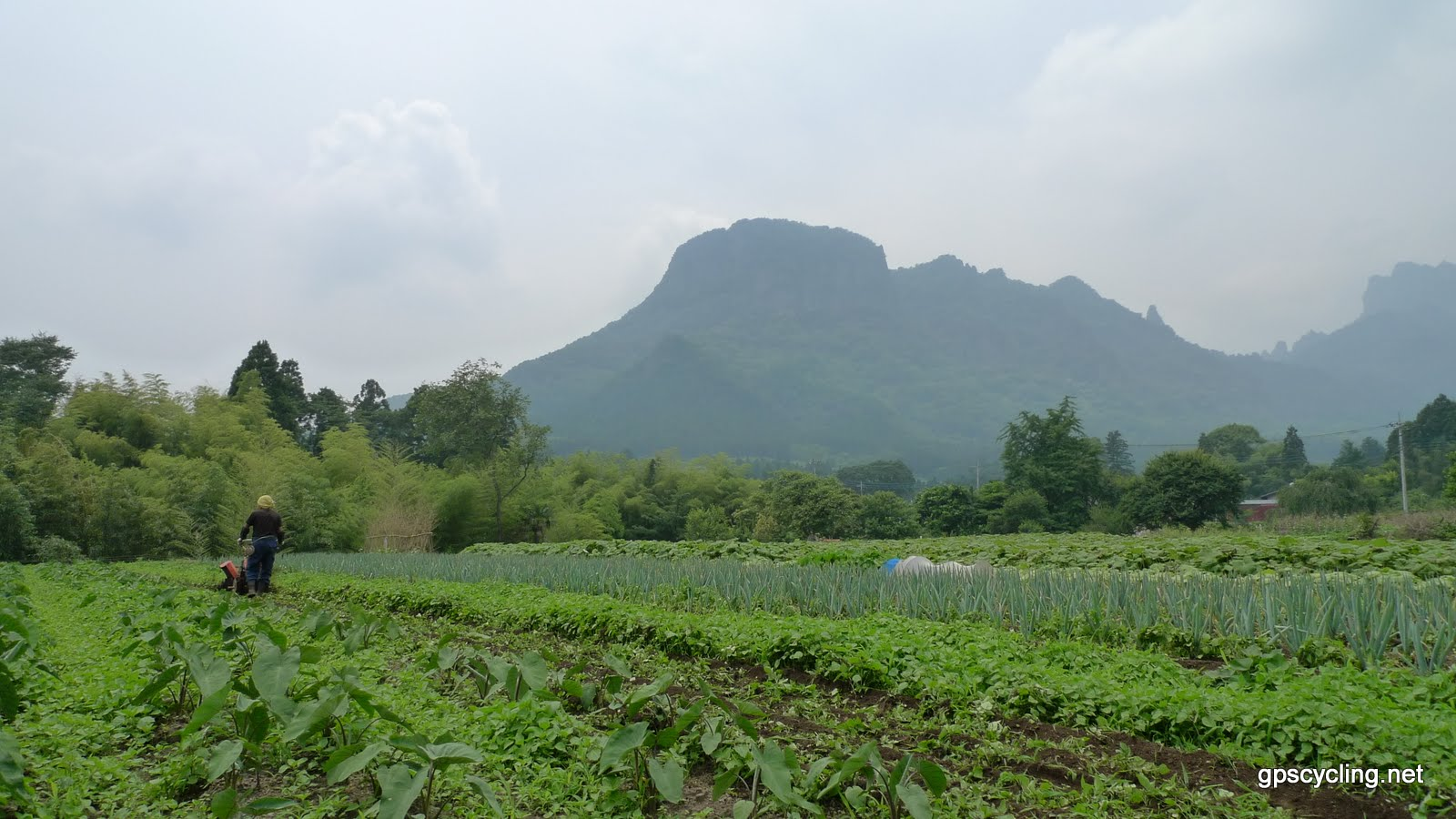
Panorama view

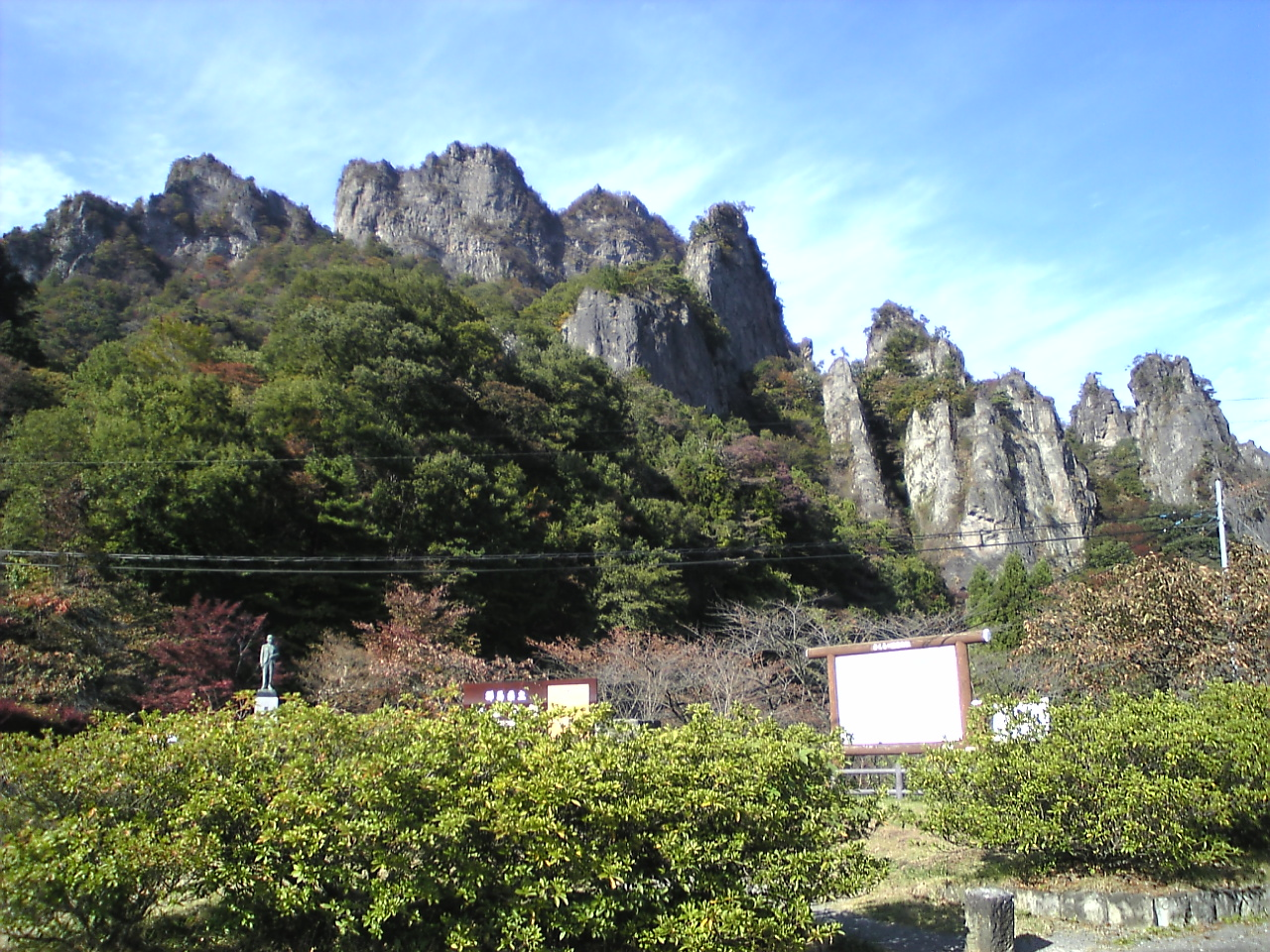
View from Sakura-no-sato

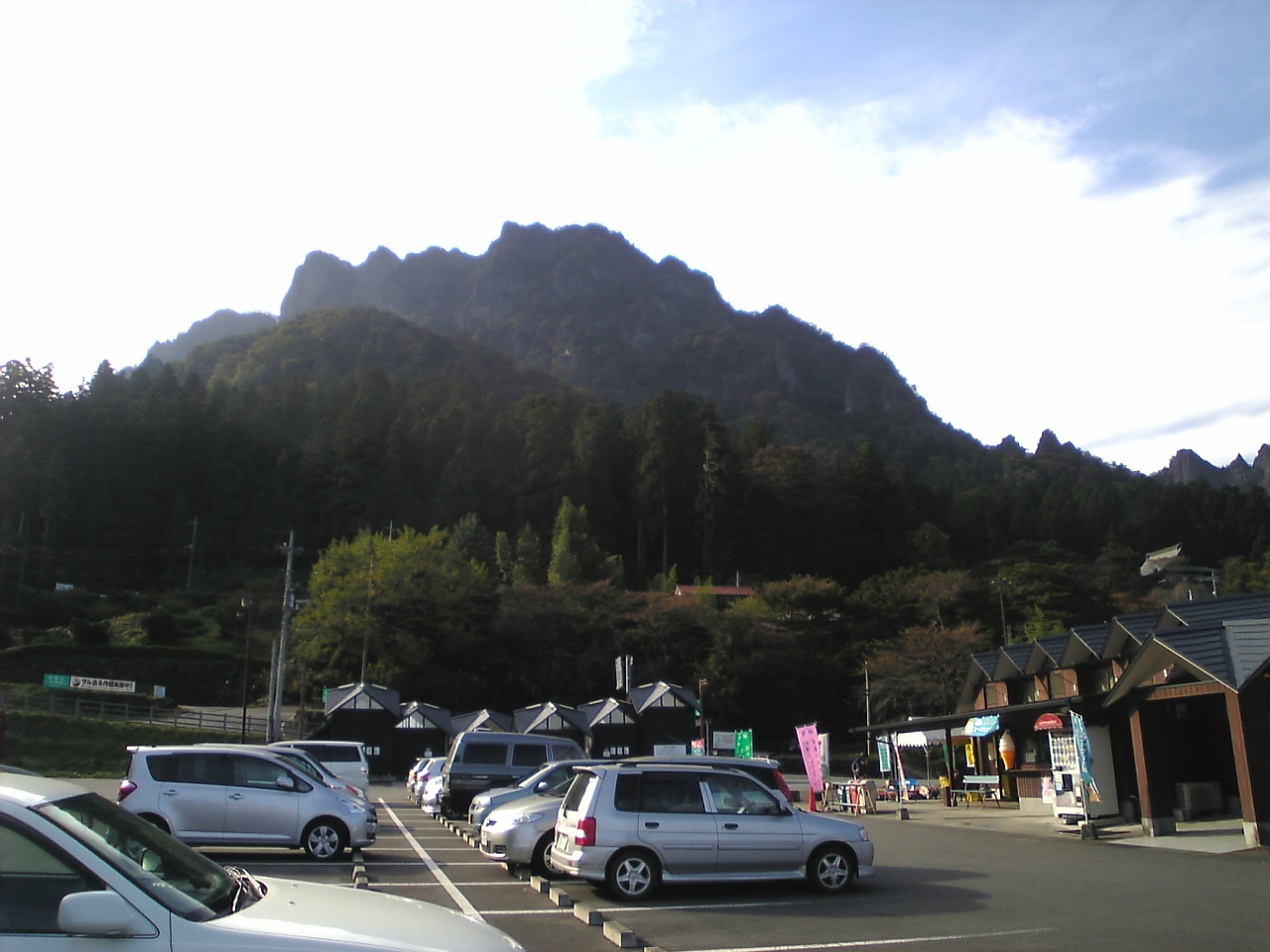
View from the Myōgi Road Station

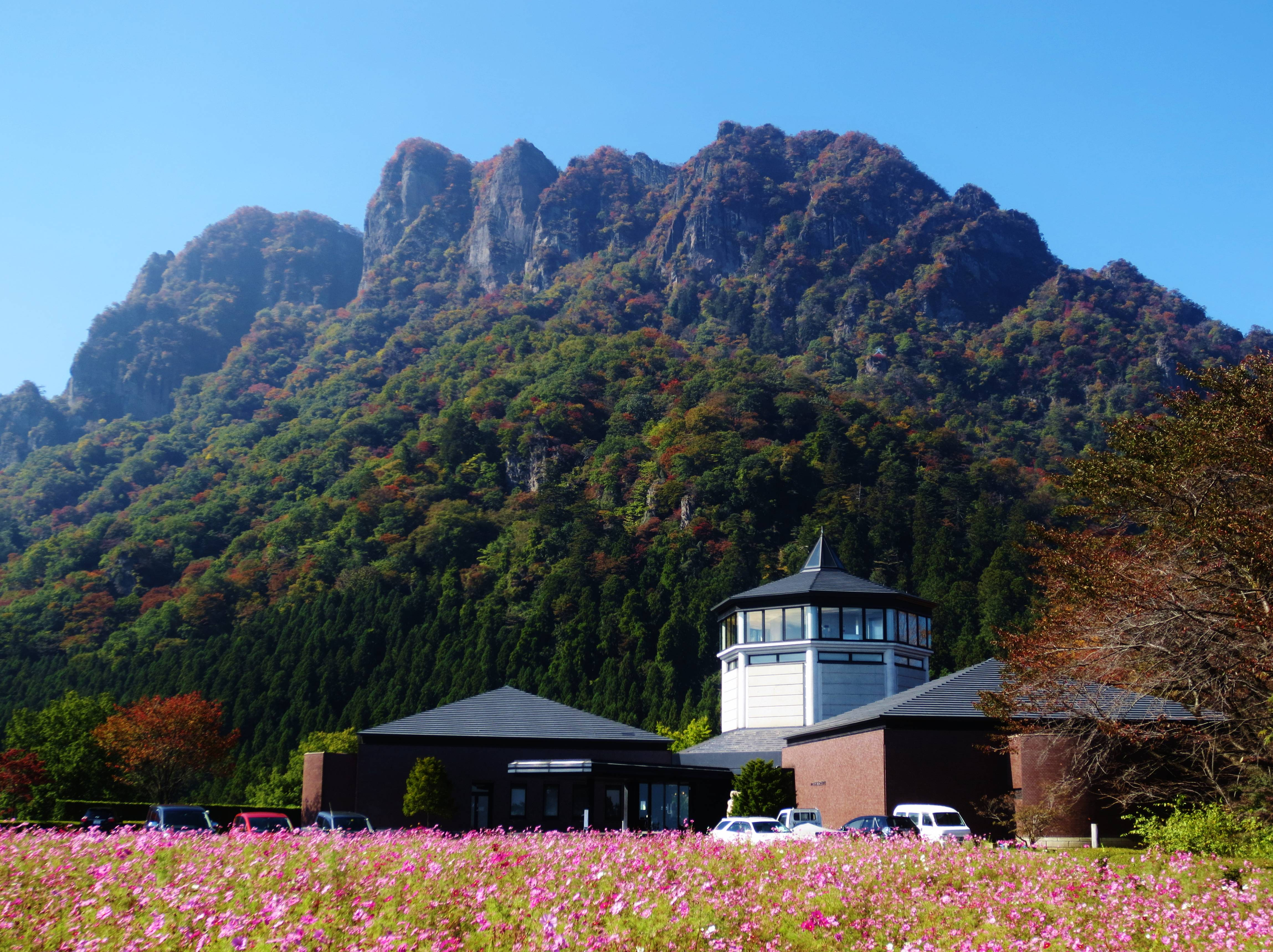
View from Myōgi Furusato Art Museum

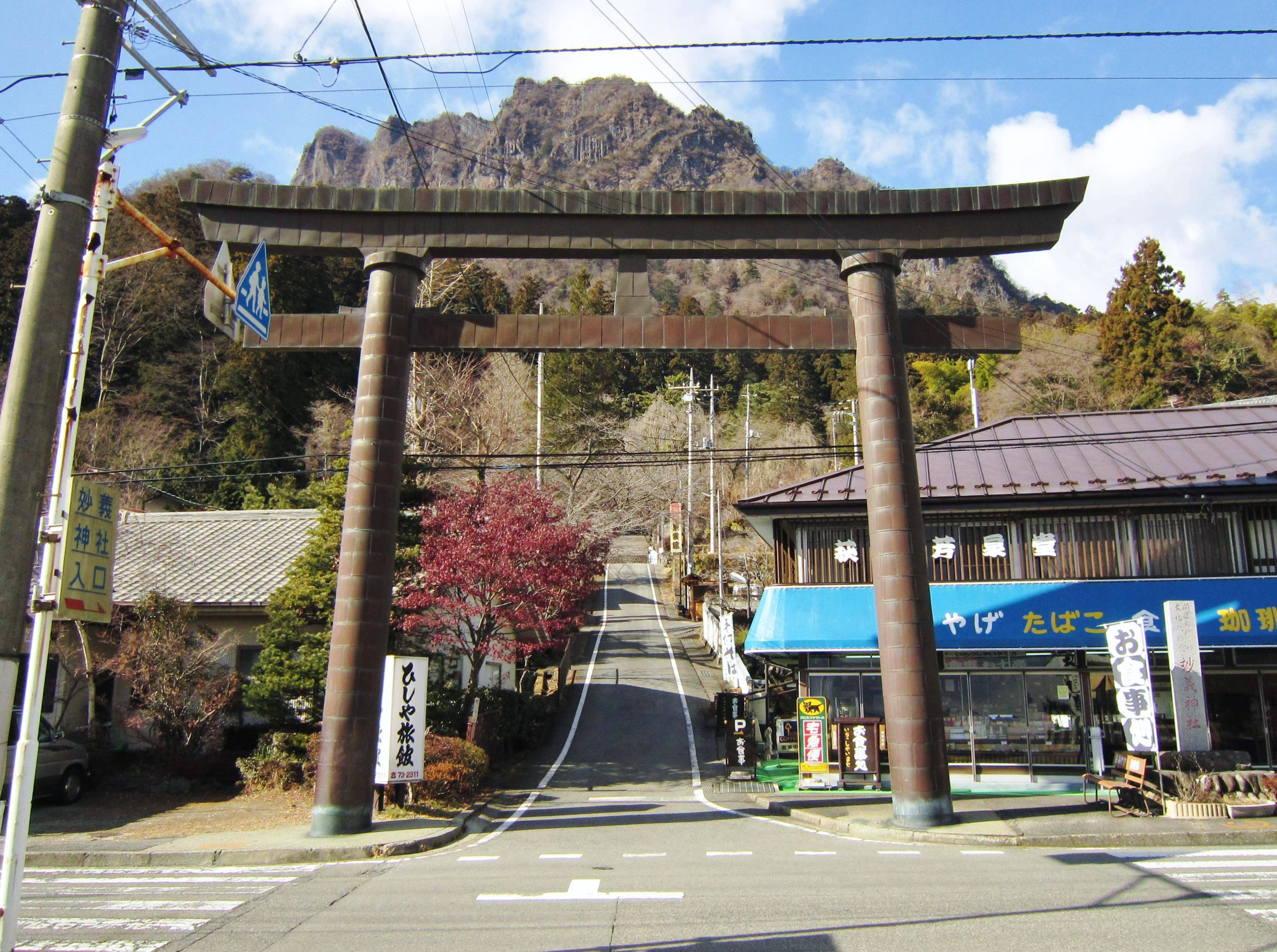
Entrance to Myōgi Jinja

== See also ==
- Myōgi
- List of Places of Scenic Beauty of Japan (Gunma)
