= Kanra District, Gunma =

District in Gunma prefecture, Japan

Location of Kanra District in Gunma Prefecture

Kanra District (甘楽郡, Kanra-gun) is a rural district in Gunma Prefecture, Japan. As of January 2015, the district had an estimated population of 22,972 and an area of 365.82 km^{2}, with a population density of 62.8 people per square kilometer.

== Towns and villages ==
- Kanra
- Nanmoku
- Shimonita

The southern part of the city of Takasaki and all of the city of Tomioka were formerly part of the district.

== History ==
The area of Kanra District was formerly part of Kōzuke Province and appears in Nara period records, such as the 711 Shoku Nihongi as Kanra gun (甘良郡). Its etymology indicates that it was an area settled by large numbers of people from the Korean Peninsula. Per a census conducted at the end of the Edo period, the area was divided into three towns and 79 villages administered as tenryō directly by the Tokugawa shogunate, 22 villages under the control of Nanokaichi Domain and 32 villages under the control of Obata Domain. Two more villages were under the shared control of Obata Domain and the Tokugawa shogunate.

On December 7, 1878, the area was divided into Minamikanra District (which became Tano District and Kitakanra District (present-day Kanra District). With the establishment of the municipality system on April 1, 1889 the area was organized into five towns (Tomioka, Ichinomiya, Myōgi, Shimonita and Fukushima) and 18 villages.

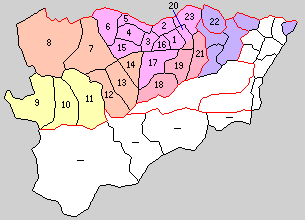
Historic Map of Kanra District in 1889: 1. Tomioka, 2. Kuroiwa, 3. Ichinomiya, 4. Nyu, 5. Takada, 6. Myōgi, 7. Kosaka, 8. Nishimaki, 9. Ozawa, 10. Tsukigata, 11.Iwado, 12.Aokura, 13. Shimonita, 14. Mayama, 15. Yoshida, 16. Takase, 17. Nukabe, 18. Akihata, 19. Obata, 20. Fukushima, 21. Niiya, 22. Iwadaira, 23. Ono

=== Modern timeline ===
- 1925, May 10 – Obata village was raised to town status
- 1950, April 1 – Kitakanra District was renamed Kanra District
- 1954, April 1 – Ono, Kuroiwa, and Takase villages and Ichinomiya town were merged into Tomioka, which was then raised to city status.
- 1955, January 15 – Iwadaira village is annexed by Yoshii Town in Tano District
- 1955, March 10 - Shimonita annexed the villages of Kosaka, Nishimaki, Aokura and Mayama
- 1955, March 15 – Akihata village was annexed by Obata Town
- 1955, March 20 – Taka village was annexed by Myōgi Town
- 1955, April 1 – Yoshida village was annexed by Tomioka City
- 1959, February 1 – Fukushima and Niiya villages were into Obata Town, which was renamed Kanra Town
- 1960, April 1 – Nyu village was merged into Tomioka City
- 2006, March 27 - Myōgi town merged into the city of Tomioka
