= Japan National Route 254 =

Road in Japan

National Route 254
- 国道254号
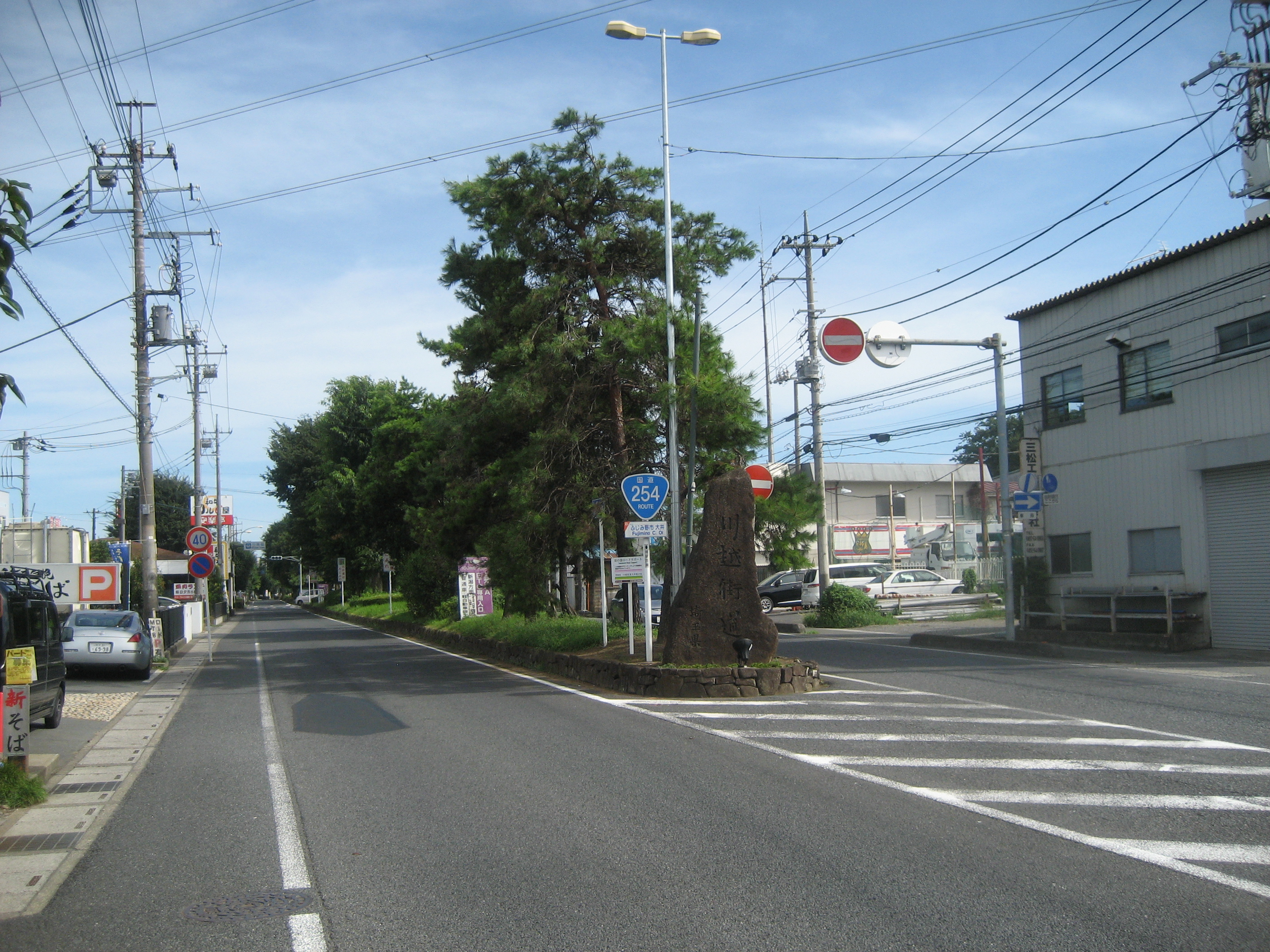

Route information
- Length: 226.1 km (140.5 mi)
- Existed: 1 April 1963–present

Major junctions
- West end: National Route 19 / National Route 147 in Matsumoto, Nagano
- East end: National Route 17 in Bunkyō, Tokyo

Location
- Country: Japan

Highway system
- National highways of Japan; Expressways of Japan
← National Route 253	→ National Route 255

National Route 254 (国道254号, Kokudō 254-gō) is a national highway of Japan connecting Bunkyō, Tokyo and Matsumoto, with a total length of 226.1 kilometers (140.5 mi).
