= Oda Nobunari =

Edo-period Japanese daimyo (1661–1731)

Oda Nobunari (Edo period)
- 織田 信就

4th Daimyō of Obata Domain
- In office 1714–1731
- Preceded by: Oda Nobuhisa
- Succeeded by: Oda Nobusuke

Head of Oda clan
- In office 1714–1731
- Preceded by: Oda Nobuhisa
- Succeeded by: Oda Nobusuke

Personal details
- Born: 1661
- Died: July 13, 1731 (aged 69–70) Edo, Japan
- Parent(s): Oda Nobuhisa (father); Daughter of Inaba Nobumichi (mother)
- Relatives: Oda Nobunaga (great-great-grandfather)

Military service
- Allegiance: Tokugawa shogunate
- Rank: Jijū (Chamberlain)

Oda Nobunari (Japanese: 織田 信就; 1661 – July 13, 1731) was a Japanese daimyo of the mid-Edo period. He served as the 4th daimyō of the Obata Domain in Kōzuke Province (modern-day Kanra District, Gunma) and was the hereditary head of the primary surviving branch of the Oda clan (descended from Oda Nobukatsu) from 1714 until his death in 1731.

== Early life and succession ==
Oda Nobunari was born in 1661 as the third son of Oda Nobuhisa, the 3rd Lord of Obata Domain. His mother was the daughter of Inaba Nobumichi, the lord of the Usuki Domain in Bungo Province. Given his birth order, Nobunari was not originally expected to inherit the family estate.

However, the lineage suffered disruptions due to premature deaths. His eldest brother, Oda Nobushige, and his second older brother, Oda Nobutomo (who had already been officially presented to the shogunate as the heir apparent), both died at young ages. To prevent the extinguishment of the clan line—which would lead to automatic land forfeiture (attainder) by the Tokugawa Shogunate—Nobunari was brought forward as the new official heir. In 1694, he traveled to Edo and was granted his first formal audience with the 5th Shogun, Tokugawa Tsunayoshi, validating his place in the succession.

== Rule of Obata Domain ==
Following the death of his father Nobuhisa on August 17, 1714, Nobunari assumed active governance over the 20,000-koku Obata Domain. In December of that same year, he journeyed to Edo Castle for an audience with Shogun Tokugawa Ietsugu. During this reception, he was granted the Junior Fourth Court Rank, Lower Grade (従四位下), alongside the honorary title of Mino-no-kami (Governor of Mino Province) and a court appointment as a Jijū (Chamberlain) to the shogunal court.

Nobunari's 17-year tenure occurred during the Kyōhō era, a period marked by peaceful stabilization and fiscal reforms across Japan. He focused heavily on regional infrastructure, directing local engineering projects to maintain and expand the Ogawa Canal (雄川堰), an irrigation system running through the castle town of Obata that boosted local agricultural output.

Nobunari died in his clan's permanent Edo residence on July 13, 1731. He was succeeded by his grandson, Oda Nobusuke. Nobunari is buried alongside his ancestors at the Shōfuku-ji temple (崇福寺) in Gunma Prefecture.

== Family ==
- Father: Oda Nobuhisa
- Mother: Daughter of Inaba Nobumichi
- Children:
  - Oda Nobutoki (Eldest son; died young)
  - Oda Nobumasa (Second son)
  - Daughter (married Toda Tadamasa of the Utsunomiya Domain)
