= List of places of scenic beauty of Japan (Gunma) =

This list is of the places of scenic beauty of Japan located within the Prefecture of Gunma.

== National Places of Scenic Beauty ==
As of 1 August 2020, eight Places have been designated at a national level; Sanbaseki Gorge spans the prefectural borders with Saitama.

Site	Municipality	Comments	Image	Coordinates	Type	Ref.
Rakusan-en 楽山園; Rakusan-en	Kanra			36°13′42″N 138°54′52″E	1	
Agatsuma Gorge 吾妻峡; Agatsumakyō	Higashiagatsuma, Naganohara			36°33′46″N 138°43′20″E	5, 6	
Sanba River sakura 三波川（サクラ） Sanbagawa (sakura)	Fujioka	also a Natural Monument		36°09′42″N 139°01′17″E	3	
Fukiware Ravine and Falls 吹割渓ならびに吹割瀑; Fukiwarekei narabini Fukiware-baku	Numata	also a Natural Monument		36°42′00″N 139°12′27″E	6	
Mount Myōgi 妙義山; Myōgi-san	Tomioka, Shimonita, Annaka			36°17′29″N 138°44′49″E	10	
Tsutsujigaoka Park つつじが岡公園; Tsutsujigaoka (tsutsuji)	Tatebayashi			36°14′34″N 139°33′19″E	1, 3	
Yubatake 湯畑; Yubatake	Kusatsu	one of the 100 Fragrant Landscapes of Japan (かおり風景100選)		36°37′14″N 138°35′46″E	9	
Sanbaseki Gorge 三波石峡; Sanbasekikyō	Fujioka	also a Natural Monument; designation includes an area of Kamikawa in Saitama Prefecture		36°07′46″N 139°01′46″E	5, 6	

== Prefectural Places of Scenic Beauty ==
As of 1 May 2019, five Places have been designated at a prefectural level.

Site	Municipality	Comments	Image	Coordinates	Type	Ref.
Takizawa Fudō Falls 滝沢の不動滝; Takizawa-no-Fudō-no-taki	Maebashi			36°30′32″N 139°11′17″E		for all refs see
Mount Kawate Caves and Zunyite 川手山洞窟群及びズニ石; Kawate-yama dōkutsu-gun oyobi zuni-ishi	Minakami	also a Prefectural Natural Monument		36°40′36″N 138°50′38″E		
Mount Ōmine floating islands and marshland plants 大峰山浮島及び湿原植物; Ōmine-yama ukishima oyobi shitsugen shokubutsu	Minakami	also a Prefectural Natural Monument		36°44′03″N 138°56′01″E		
Semi Valley 蝉の渓谷; Semi-no-keikoku	Nanmoku	also a Prefectural Natural Monument		36°09′24″N 138°40′52″E		
Sengataki Falls 線ヶ滝; Sengataki	Nanmoku	also a Prefectural Natural Monument		36°10′44″N 138°38′15″E		

== Municipal Places of Scenic Beauty ==
As of 1 May 2019, twenty-seven Places have been designated at a municipal level.

== See also ==
- Cultural Properties of Japan
- List of parks and gardens of Gunma Prefecture
- List of Historic Sites of Japan (Gunma)
