= List of places of scenic beauty of Japan (Saitama) =

This list is of the places of scenic beauty of Japan located within the Prefecture of Saitama.

== National Places of Scenic Beauty ==
As of 1 July 2014, three Places have been designated at a national level; Sanbaseki Gorge spans the prefectural borders with Gunma and Landscape of Oku no Hosomichi is a serial designation spanning ten prefectures.

Site	Municipality	Comments	Image	Coordinates	Type	Ref.
Nagatoro Valley 長瀞; Nagatoro	Nagatoro/Minano	also a Natural Monument		36°05′46″N 139°06′54″E	6	
Sanbaseki Gorge 三波石峡; Sanbasekkyō	Kamikawa	also a Natural Monument; designation includes an area of Fujioka in Gunma Prefecture		36°07′46″N 139°01′46″E	5, 6	
Landscape of Oku no Hosomichi - Sōka-matsubara おくのほそ道の風景地 草加松原; Oku no Hosomichi no fūkei-chi Sōka-matsubara	Sōka	designation spans ten prefectures		35°50′11″N 139°48′27″E		

== Prefectural Places of Scenic Beauty ==
As of 1 July 2014, six Places have been designated at a prefectural level.

Site	Municipality	Comments	Image	Coordinates	Type	Ref.
Mount Tenran Scenery 天覧山の勝; Tenran-zan no katsu	Hannō			35°51′43″N 139°18′30″E		
Mount Monomi Iwadonosan Kannon Scenery 物見山岩殿山観音の勝; Monomi-yama Iwadono-san Kannon no katsu	Higashimatsuyama			36°00′05″N 139°21′44″E		
Tamayodo 玉淀; Tamayodo	Yorii			36°06′55″N 139°09′54″E		
Ogose Plum Grove 越生の梅林; Ogose bairin	Ogose			35°58′20″N 139°16′26″E		
Nakatsu Gorge 中津峡; Nakatsu-kyō	Chichibu			35°59′46″N 138°47′40″E		
Heirin-ji Wooded Precinct 平林寺林泉境内; Heirinji rinsen keidai	Niiza			35°47′35″N 139°33′40″E		

== Municipal Places of Scenic Beauty ==
As of 1 May 2013, twenty-four Places have been designated at a municipal level.

== See also ==
- Cultural Properties of Japan
- List of parks and gardens of Saitama Prefecture
- List of Historic Sites of Japan (Saitama)
