= Rakusan-en =

Coordinates: 36°13′42.3″N 138°54′50.2″E

- 楽山園
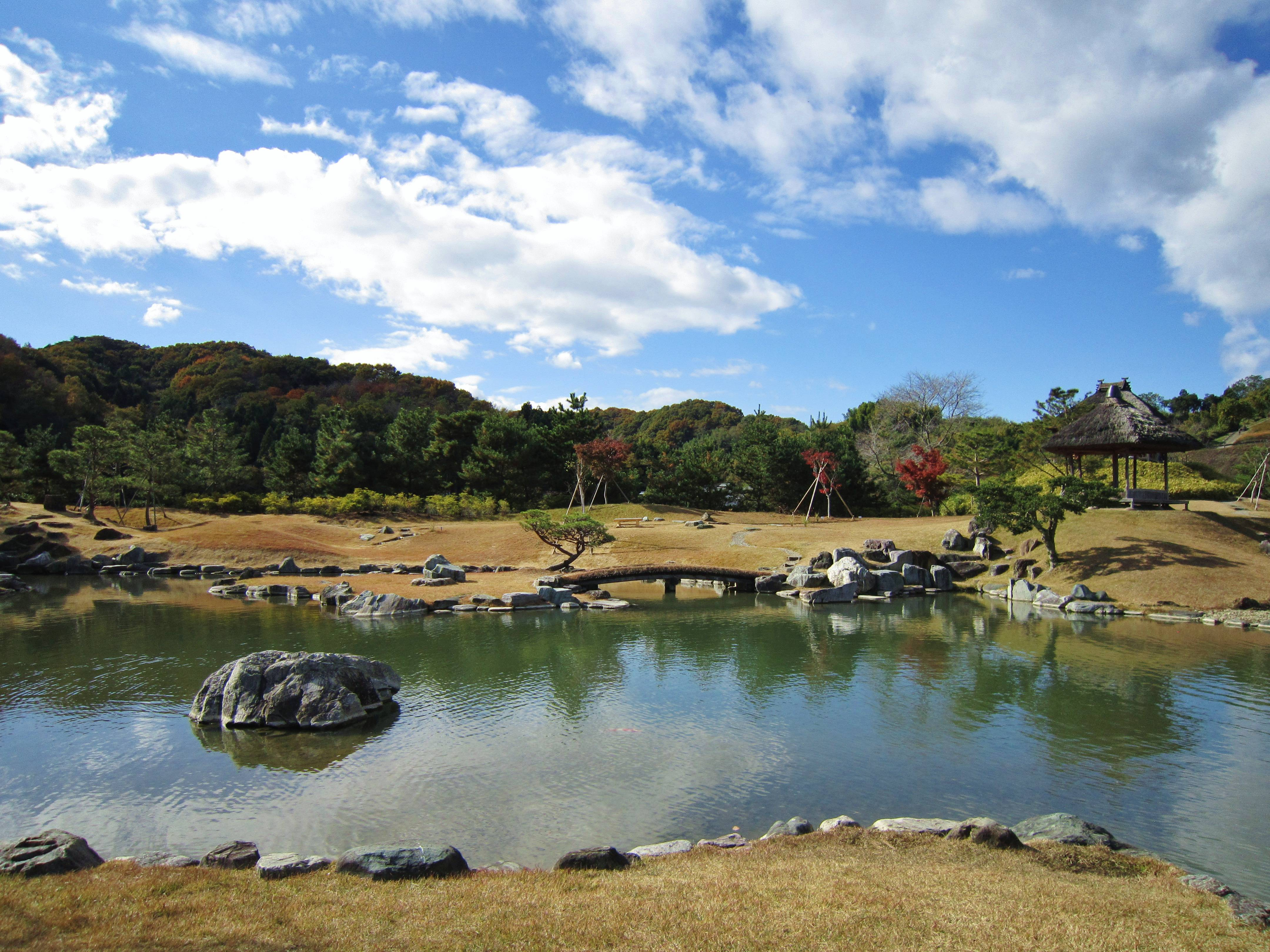
- Rakusan-en

- Location within Gunma Prefecture Location within Japan
- Type: Japanese garden
- Location: Kanra, Gunma, Japan
- Area: 23,437.33 square meters
- Created: c.1617
- Status: Open
- National Palace of Scenic Beauty

The Rakusan-en (楽山園, Sakai-shi teien) is a traditional Japanese garden located in the town of Kanra, Gunma Prefecture, Japan. It became a nationally designated Place of Scenic Beauty in 2000.

== Overview ==
This garden was designed for the Oda clan, daimyō of Obata Domain, and was constructed in the early Edo Period by Oda Nobukatsu, the daimyō of Uda-Matsuyama Domain in Yamato Province and a younger son of the famed Oda Nobunaga. Nobukatsu's fourth son, Oda Nobuyoshi, became daimyō of Obata Domain in 1617, and the clan continued to rule over the area until then Meiji restoration.

The name of the garden was taken from a phrase in the Analects of Confucius. The garden was designed around a large pond with an island, 48 stones representing the 48 hiragana letters in the Japanese alphabet, and two chashitsu for use in the Japanese tea ceremony. It makes use of borrowed scenery from nearby hills. It is the only surviving daimyō garden in Gunma Prefecture. It was designated as a National Place of Scenic Beauty in 2000 and extensively restored to bring it back to its original early Edo Period appearance in the year 2012.

== Gallery ==
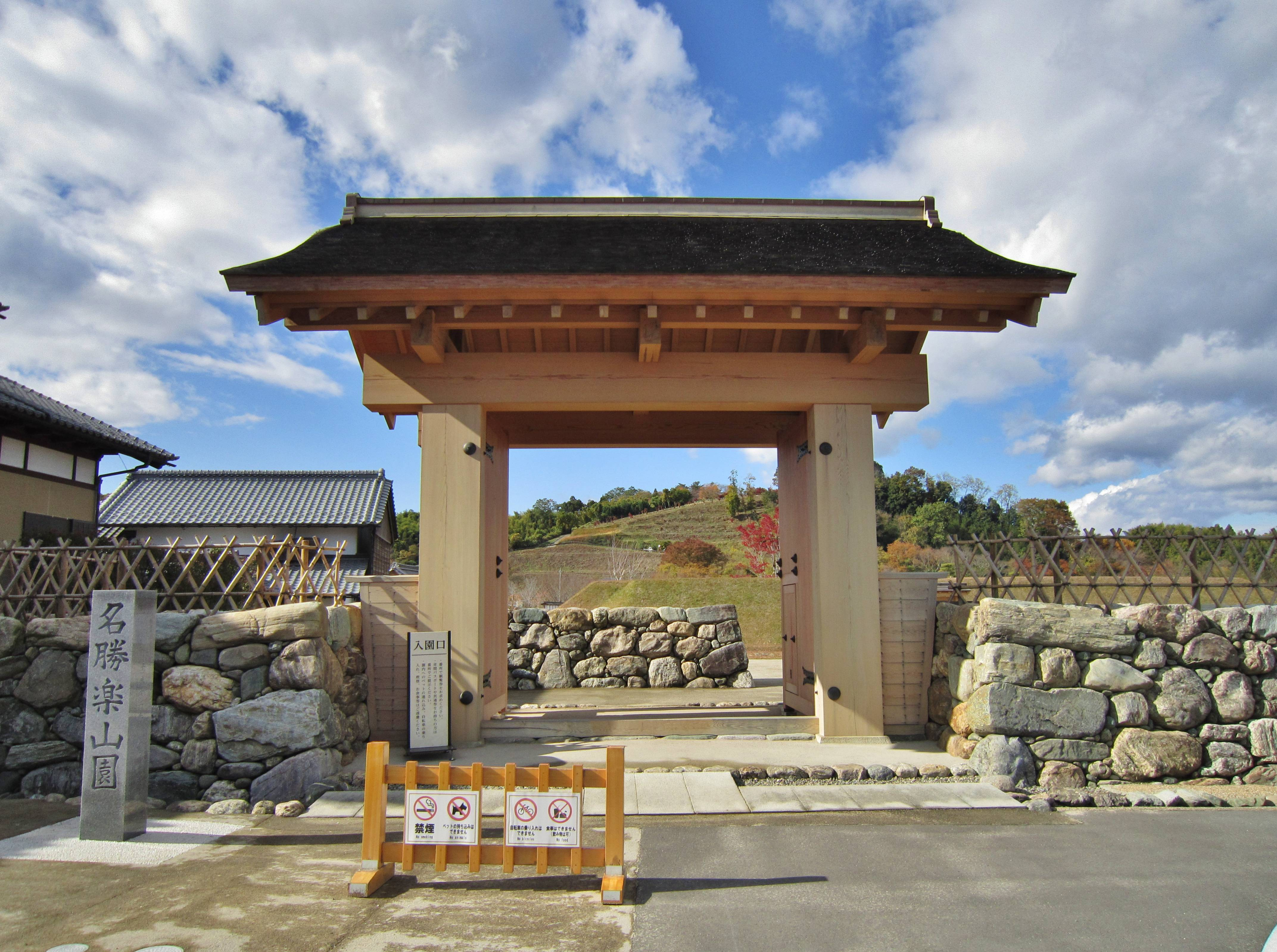
Rakusan-en central gate

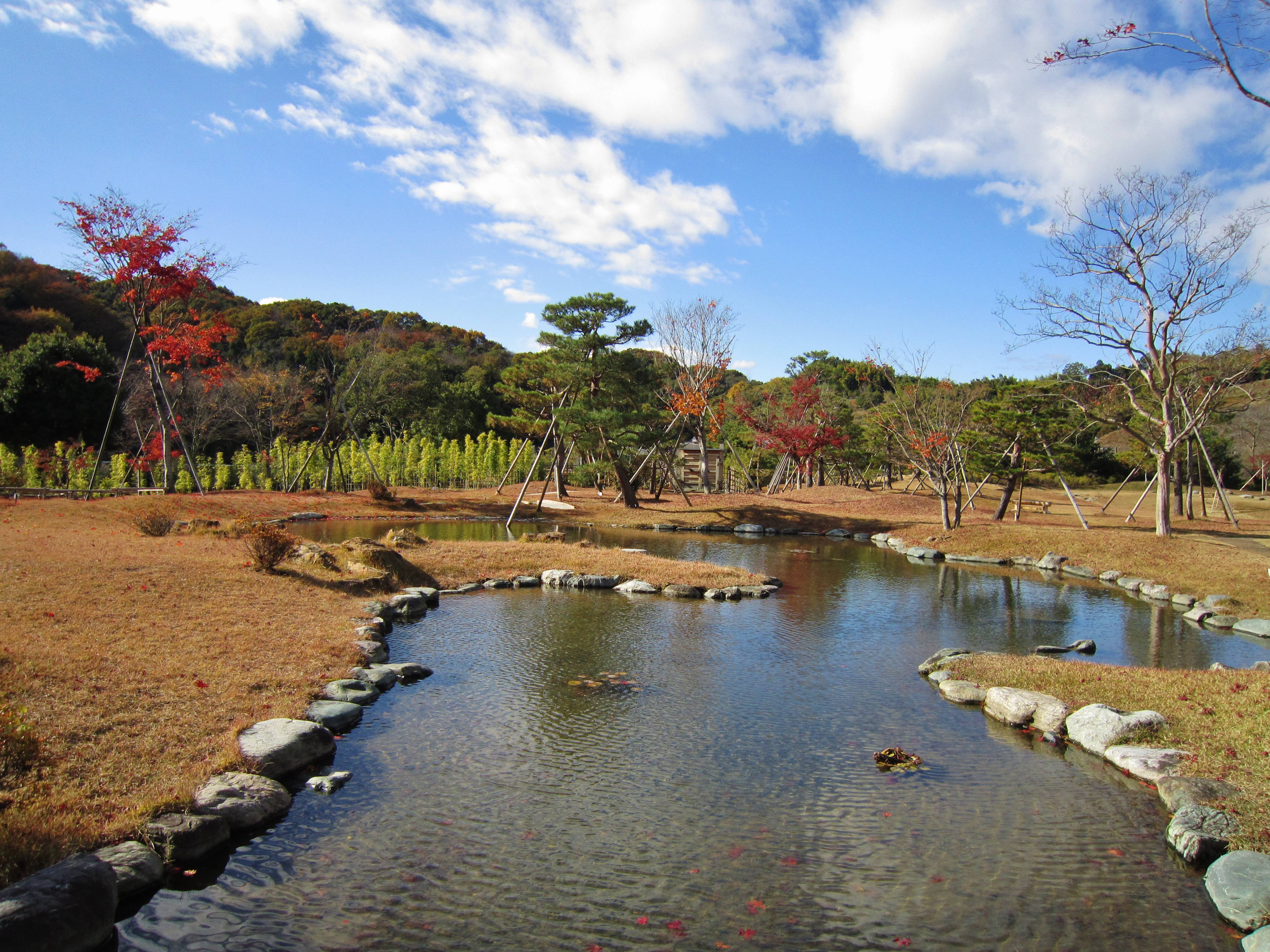
Rakusan-en southeast garden pond

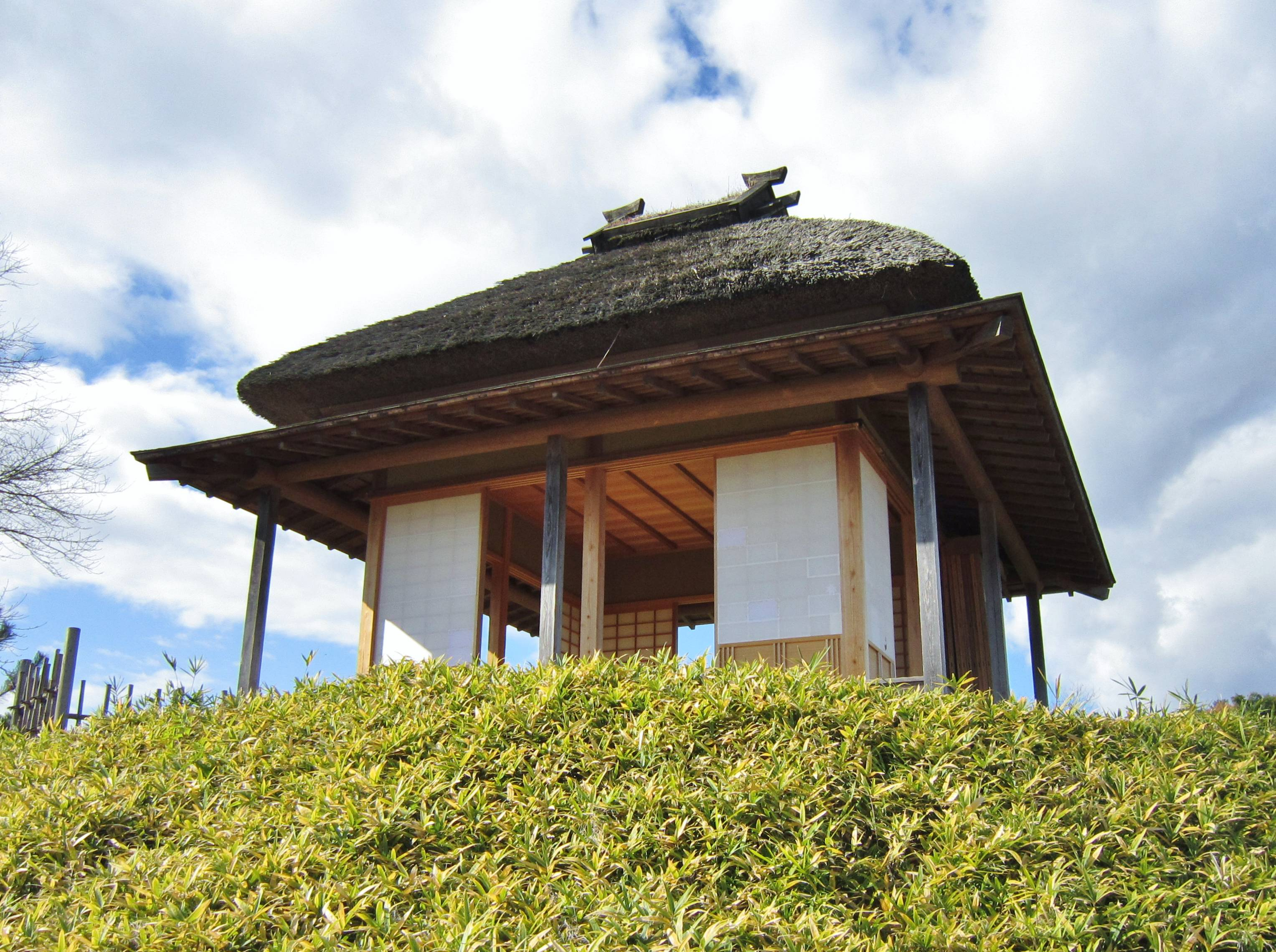
Ume-no-chaya

== See also ==
- List of Places of Scenic Beauty of Japan (Gunma)
