= Sakurayama =

Mountain in Japan

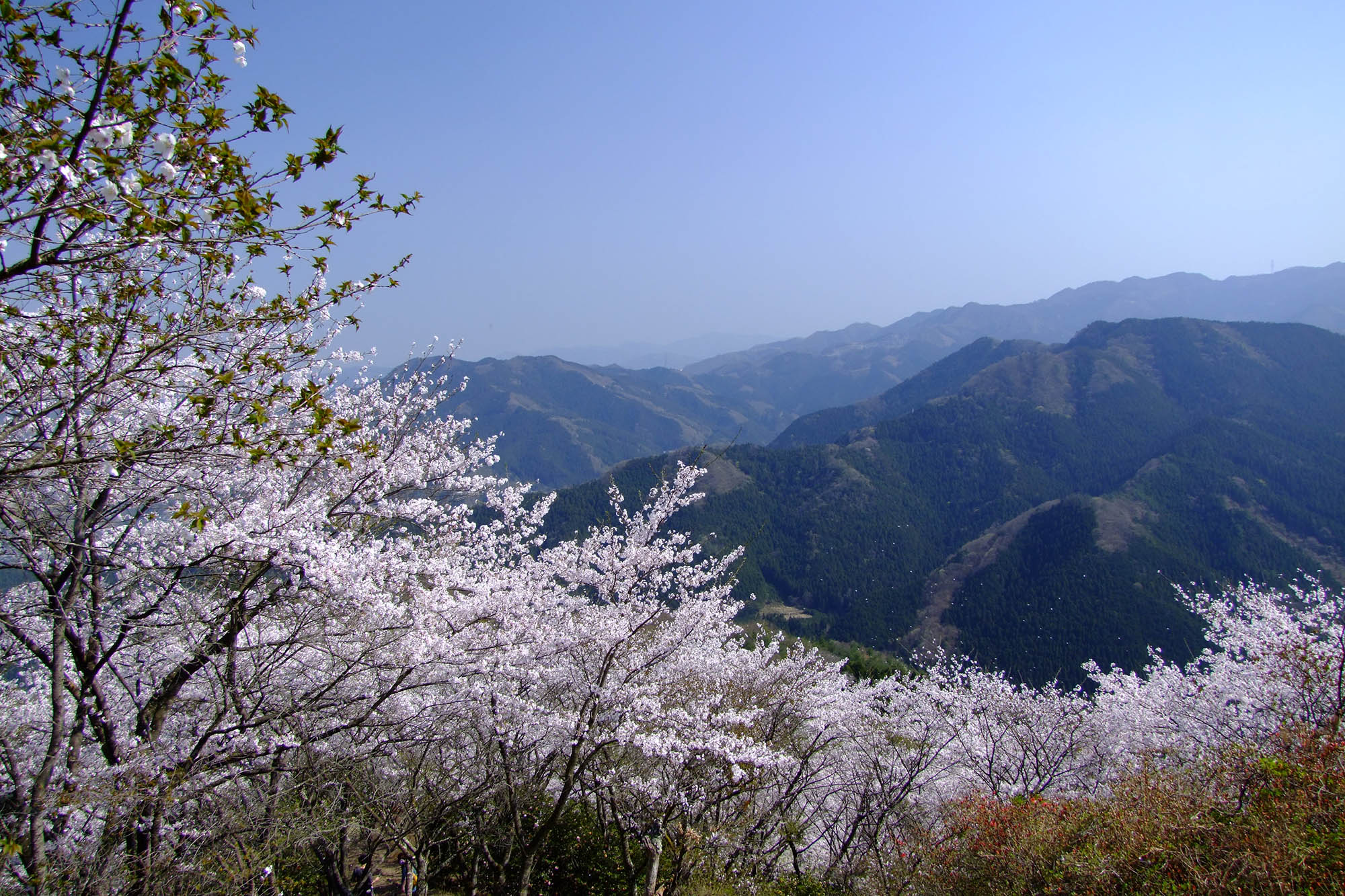
- Sakurayama in spring

Highest point
- Elevation: 591 m (1,939 ft)
- Coordinates: 36°09′42.1″N 139°01′16.2″E

Naming
- Native name: 桜山 (Japanese)

Geography
- Location within Gunma Prefecture Location within Japan
- Country: Japan
- State: Gunma Prefecture
- Region: Kantō region

Climbing
- Easiest route: Hiking
- National Palace of Scenic Beauty Natural Monument

Sakurayama (桜山) is a mountain in the city of Fujioka, Gunma Prefecture, Japan. It is 591 metres (1,939 ft) in height, and was named one of the "100 Sakura Spots in Japan" during Expo '90 by the International Flower and Green Expo Association. It is also a National Place of Scenic Beauty as determined by the Agency for Cultural Affairs in Japan.

== Overview ==
Historically known as "Kokuzōsan", Sakurayama was a focal point for Shugendō mountain cults dedicated to the worship of Kokūzō Bosatsu. In 1908, the mountain was planted with thousands of Somei Yoshino cherry trees cherry trees to honor Japan's victory in the Russo-Japanese War. These trees have since evolved or mutated, resulting in blooms that appear earlier and last longer than those in other regions. Designated a National Place of Scenic Beauty in 1937, the cherry trees were further recognized as a Living National Monument in 1948. In 1989, the mountain was incorporated into the Gunma Prefectural Sakurayama Forest Park.

The mountain is located on the middle reaches of the Sanba River (三波川) and can be reached in about 35 minutes by car from Fujioka Interchange of yer Joshin'etsu Expressway.

== Gallery ==
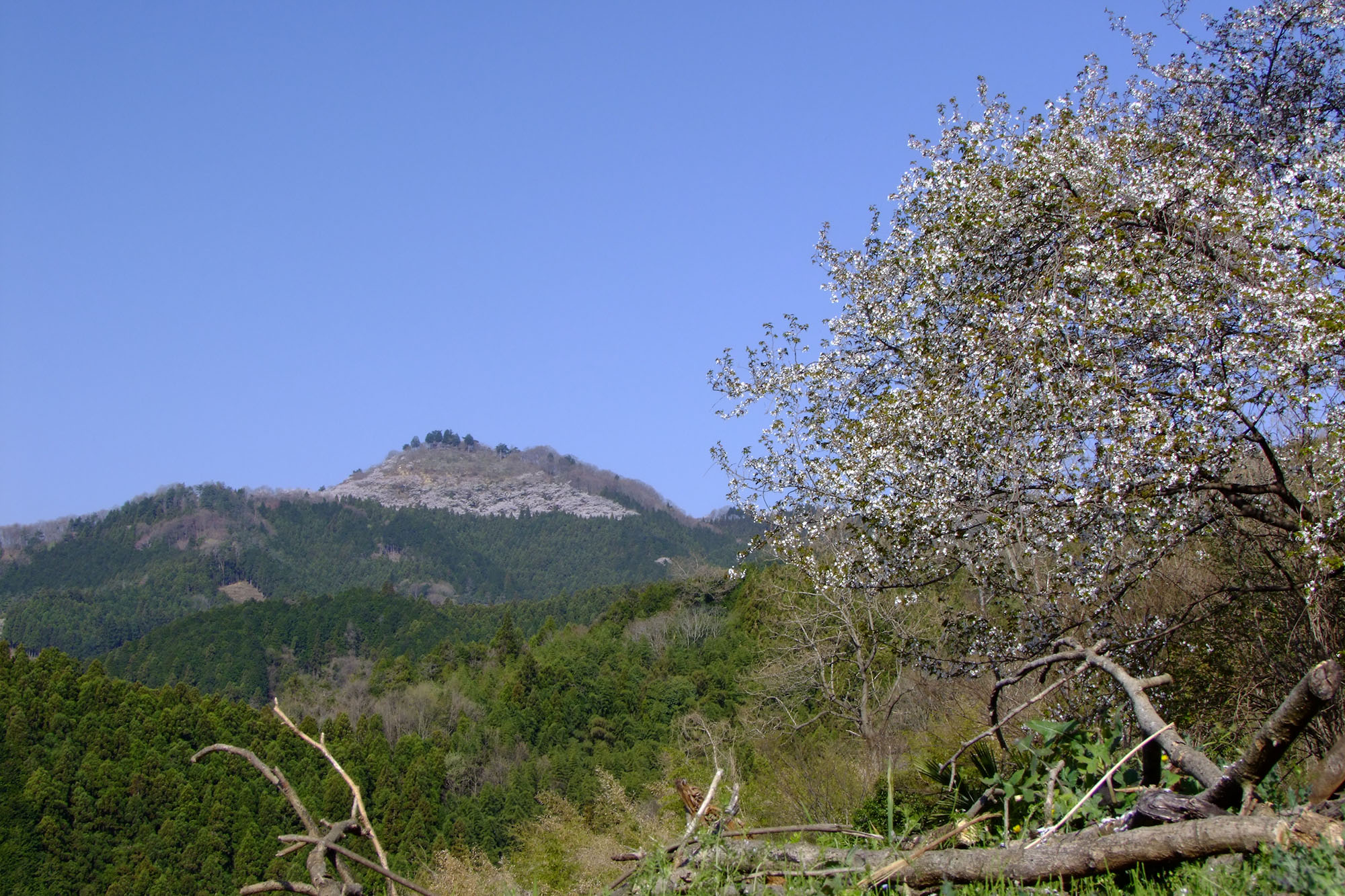
Sakurayama in spring

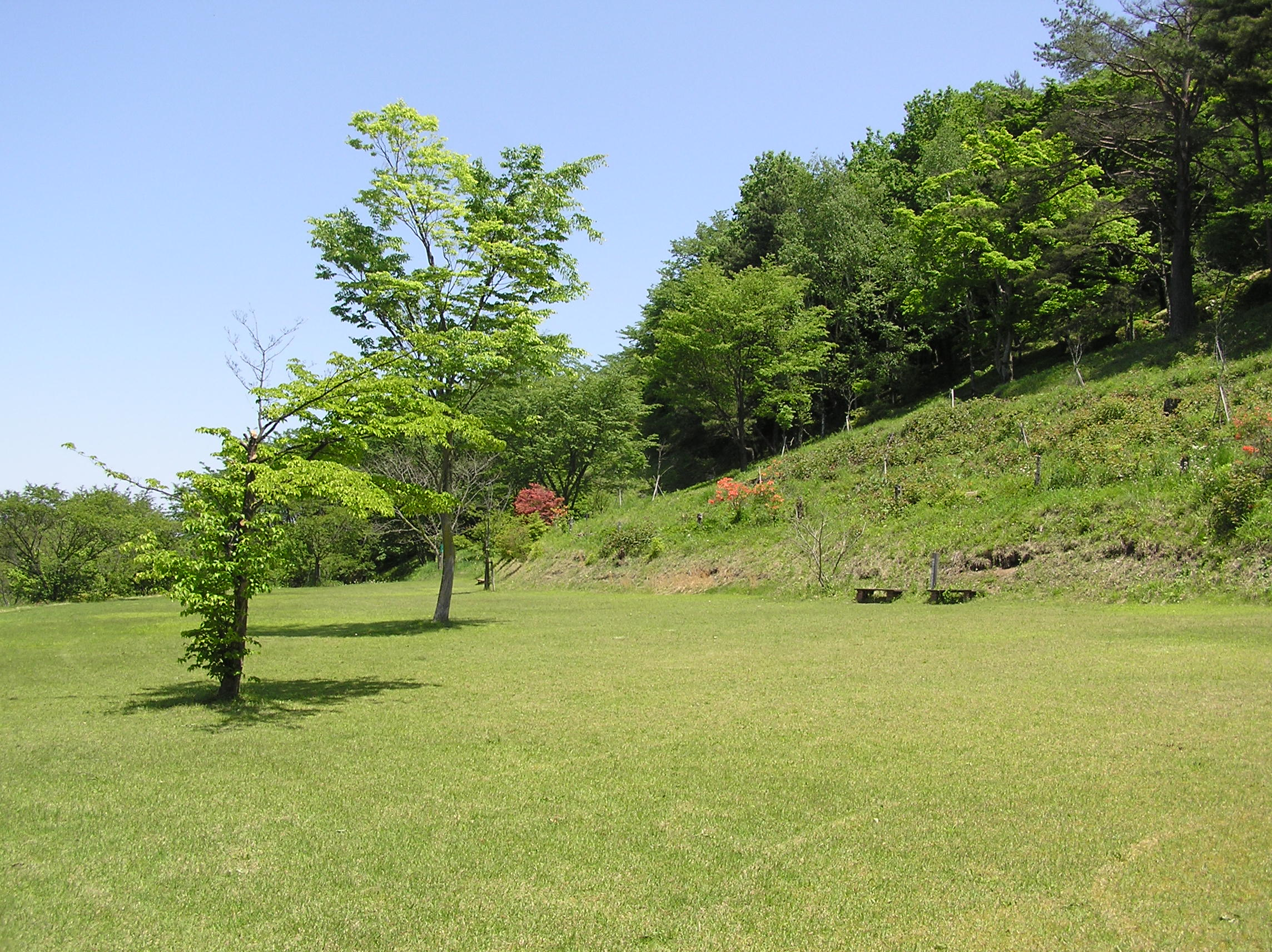
Sakurayama in summer

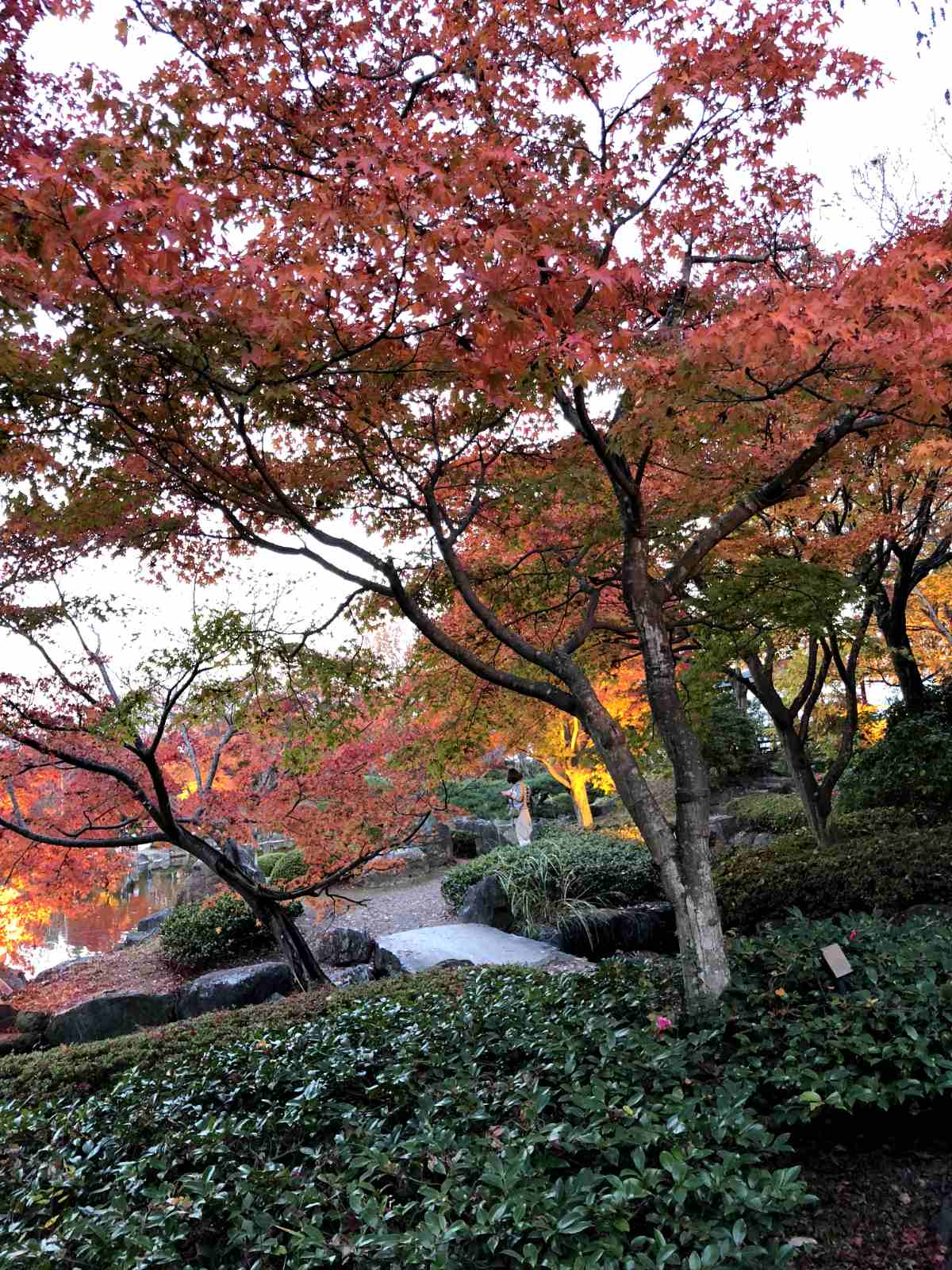
Sakurayama Park in autumn

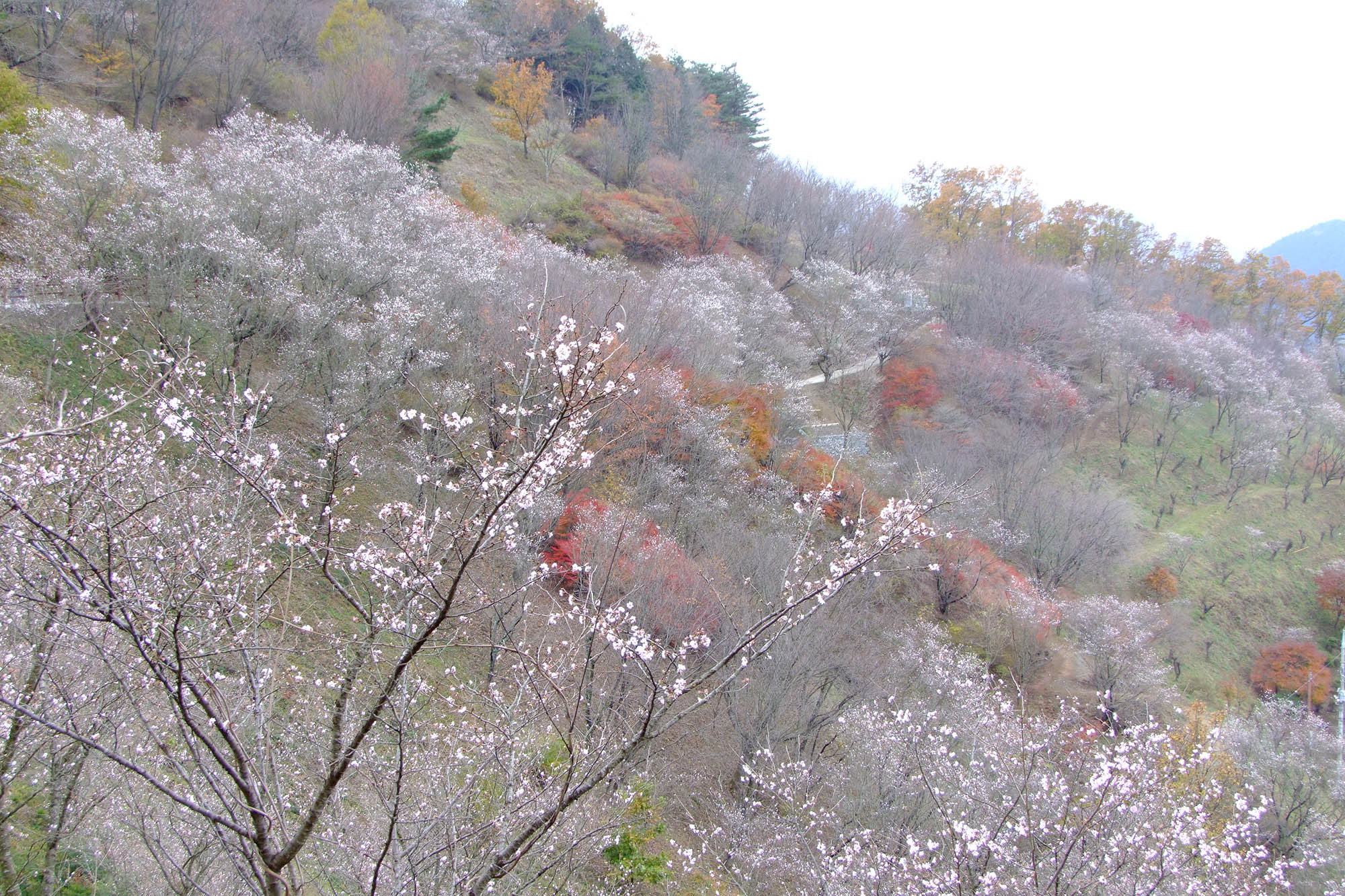
Sakurayama in winter

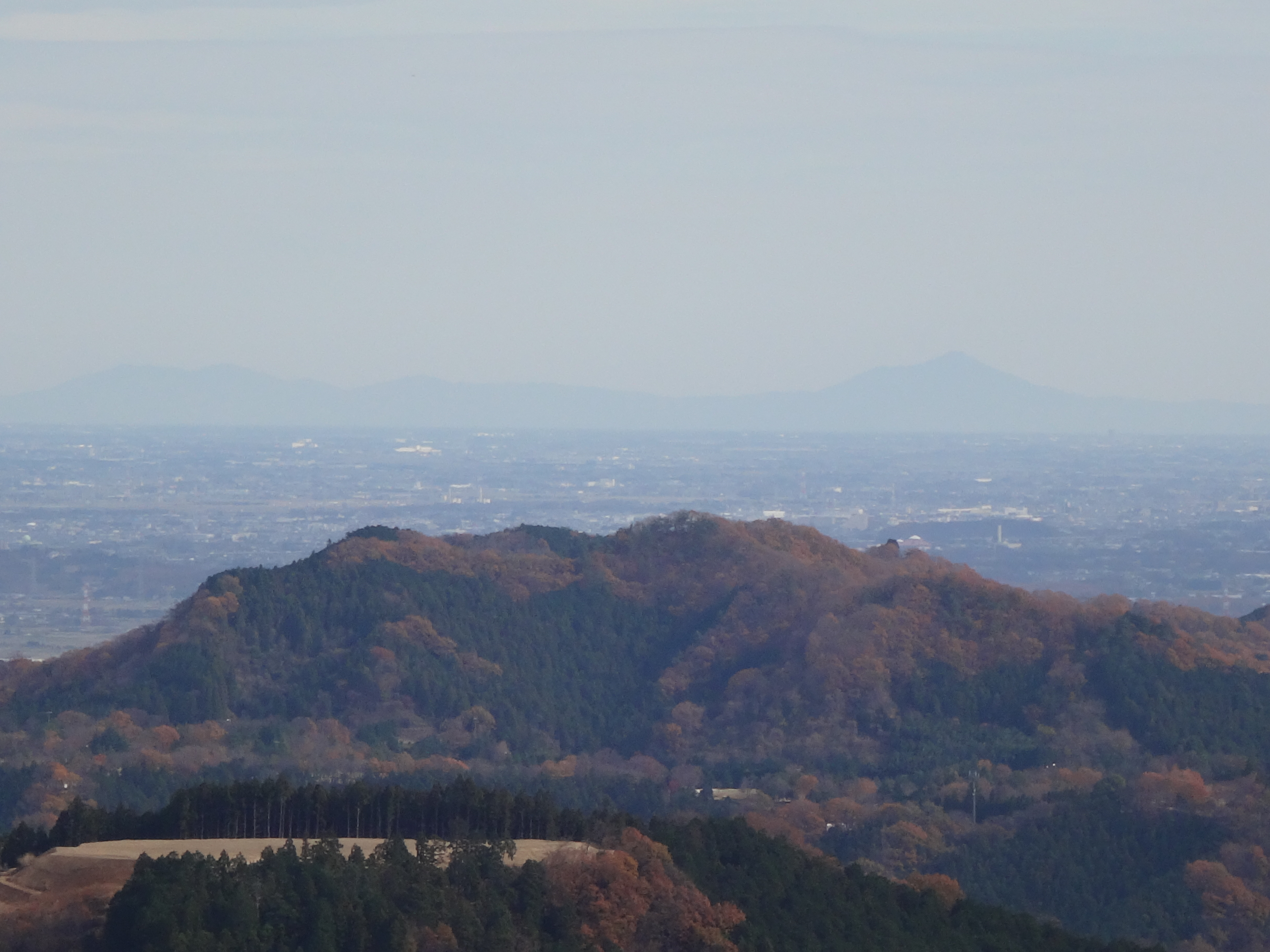
Panorama from summit of Sakurayama with Mount Ontake

== See also ==
- List of Places of Scenic Beauty of Japan (Gunma)
