= Sanbaseki Gorge =

Ravine on Fujioka, Japan

Coordinates: 36°07′42″N 139°01′47″E

Sanbaseki Gorge 三波石峡
- IUCN category III (natural monument or feature)
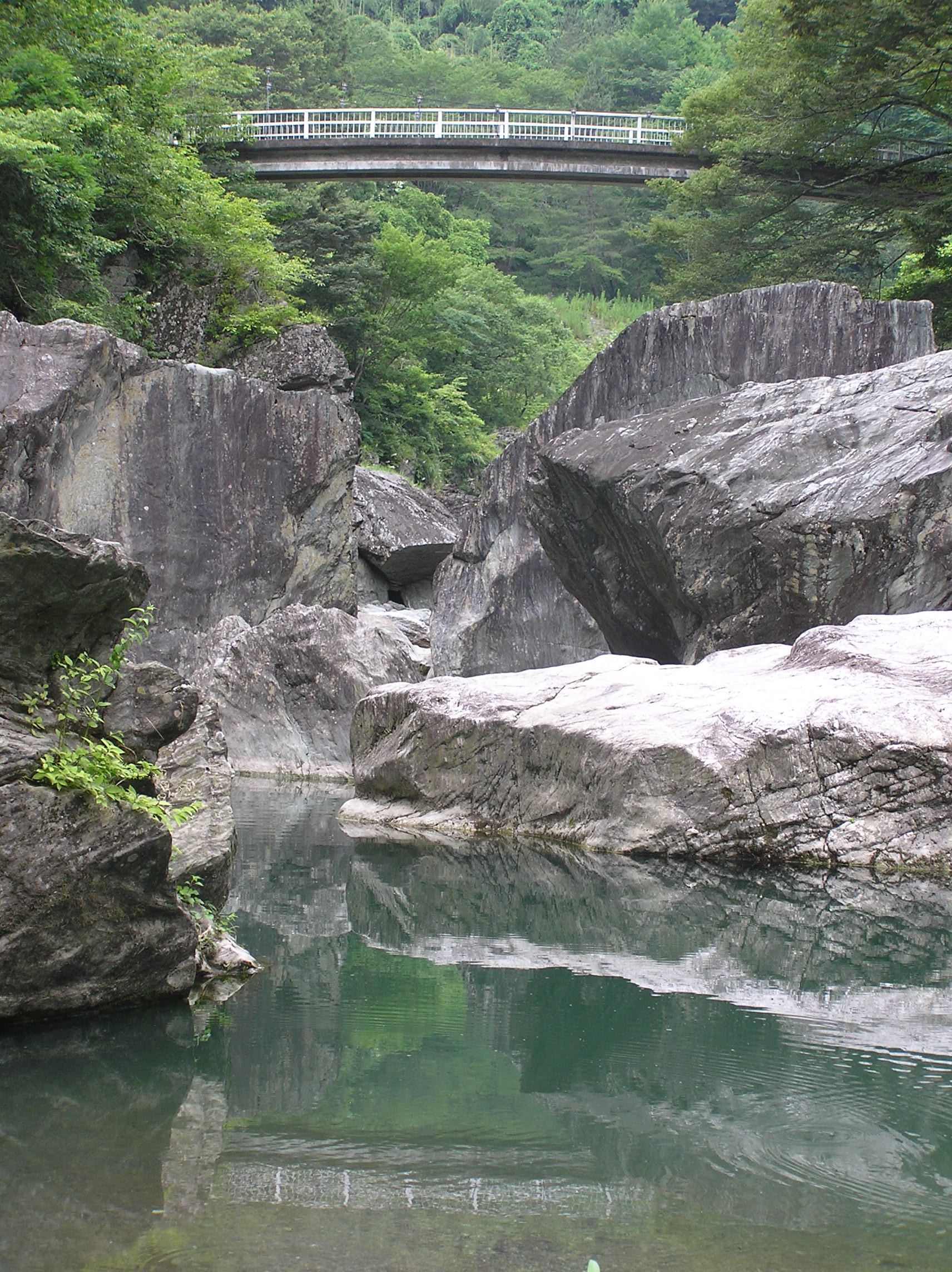
- typical panorama of Sanbaseki Gorge

- Location within Gunma Prefecture Location within Japan
- Location: Higashiagatsuma, Gunma / Kamikawa, Saitama, Japan
- Length: 1.5 km (0.93 mi)
- Established: 1935
- National Palace of Scenic Beauty Natural Monument

Sanbaseki Gorge (三波石峡, Sanbaseki-kyō) is a ravine on the Kanna River in the city of Fujioka, Gunma Prefecture, and the town of Kamikawa, Saitama Prefecture, Japan. It has been designated a National Place of Scenic Beauty and a Natural Monument since 1957.

== Overview ==
The Kanna River is an upstream tributary of the Karyu River, which flows into the Tone River. The Shimokubo Dam was constructed in this gorge in 1968, and the surviving portion of the gorge extends for about 1.5 kilometers south of the dam. Administratively, it forms the border between Saitama Prefecture and Gunma Prefecture, with Saitama Prefecture controlling the south bank and Gunma Prefecture controlling the north. Directly above both banks of the Sanbashi Gorge is a steep slope from the summit of Kamiyama (732 meters). The width of the river is narrowed from 50 meters to 25 meters in the gorge, with cliffs on both sides about 10 meters in height. The riverbed is characterized by white quartz and a green crystalline schist which was prized as garden stones in the Edo period. Especially on the cliff on the north side, there are many eroded rock formations, which were noted in Edo period travel guides, and fanciful names were given to 48 of these oddly-shaped formations. The gorge was a noted sightseeing destination from the Edo period onwards. However, construction of the Shimokubo Dam adversely affected the gorge to a great extent, causing increased sedimentation and the growth of algae and moss which has obscured the river bed.

== Gallery ==
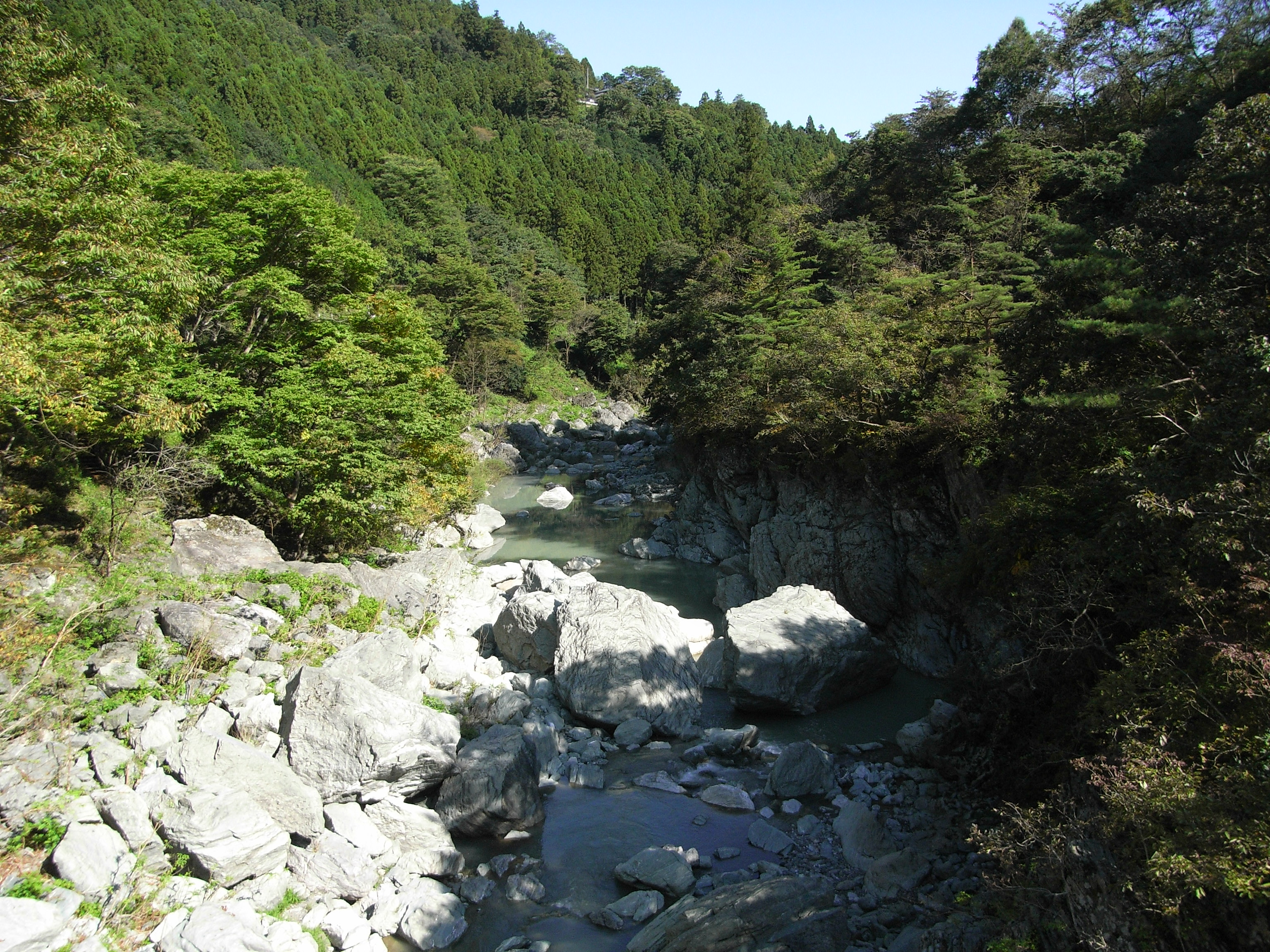

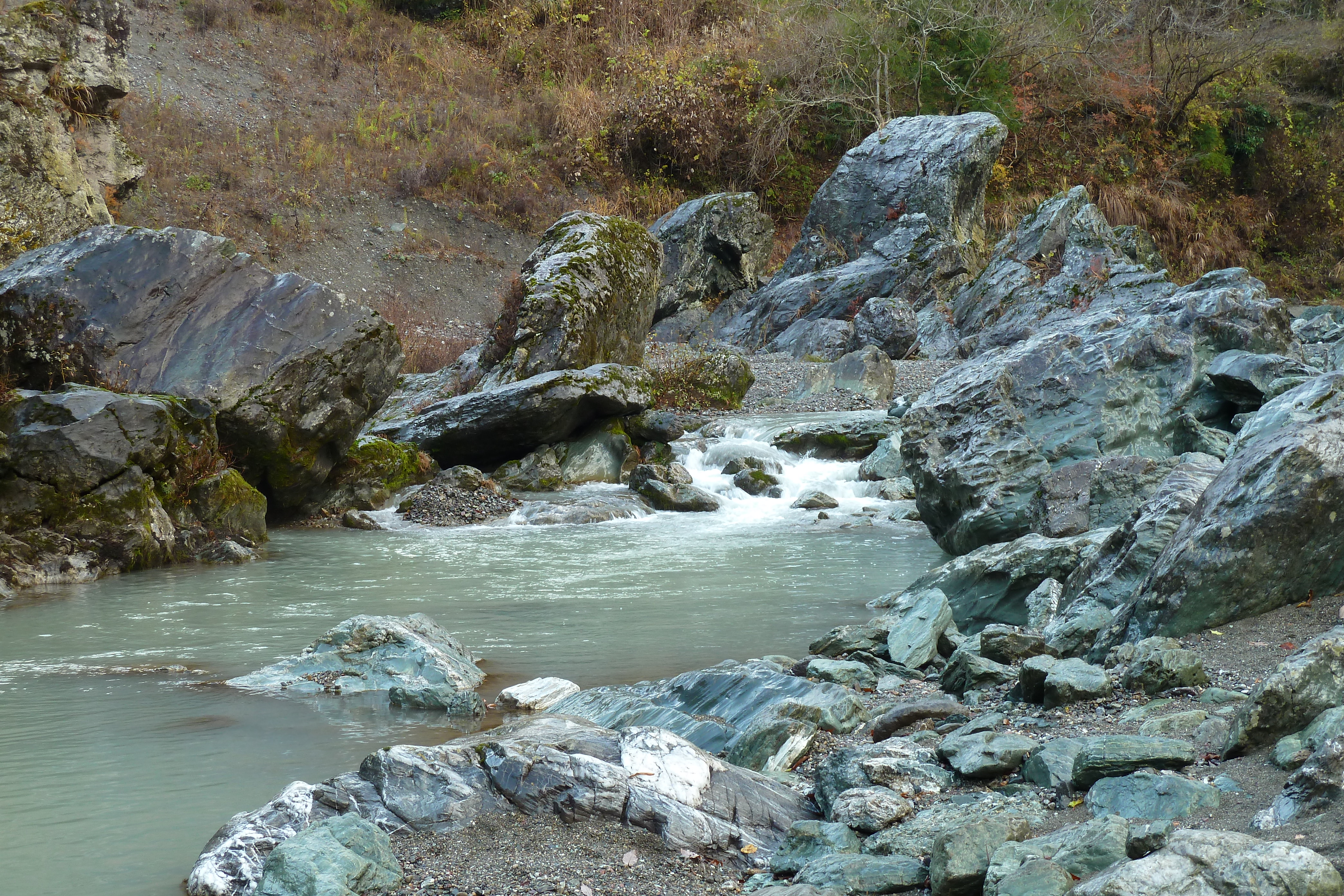

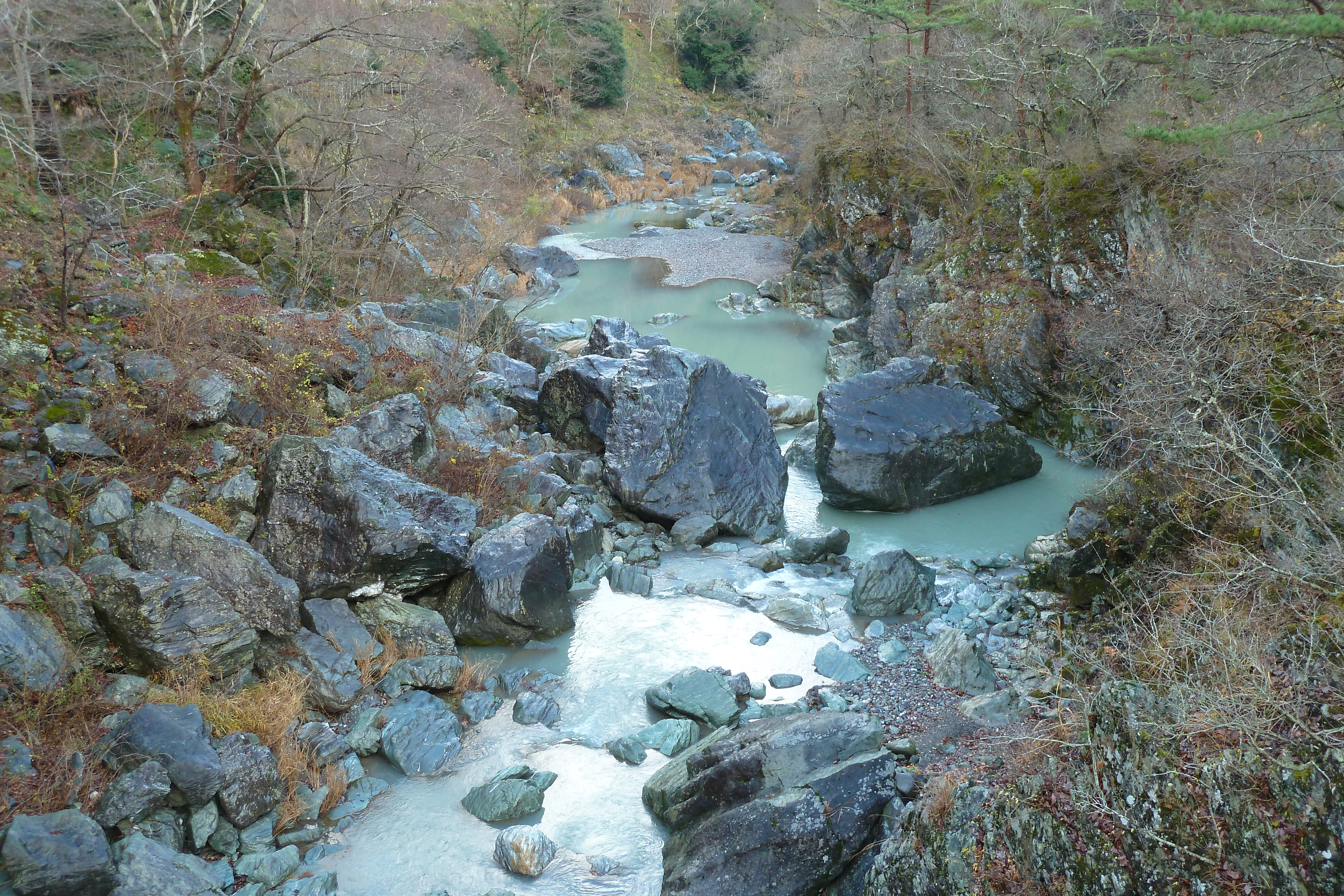

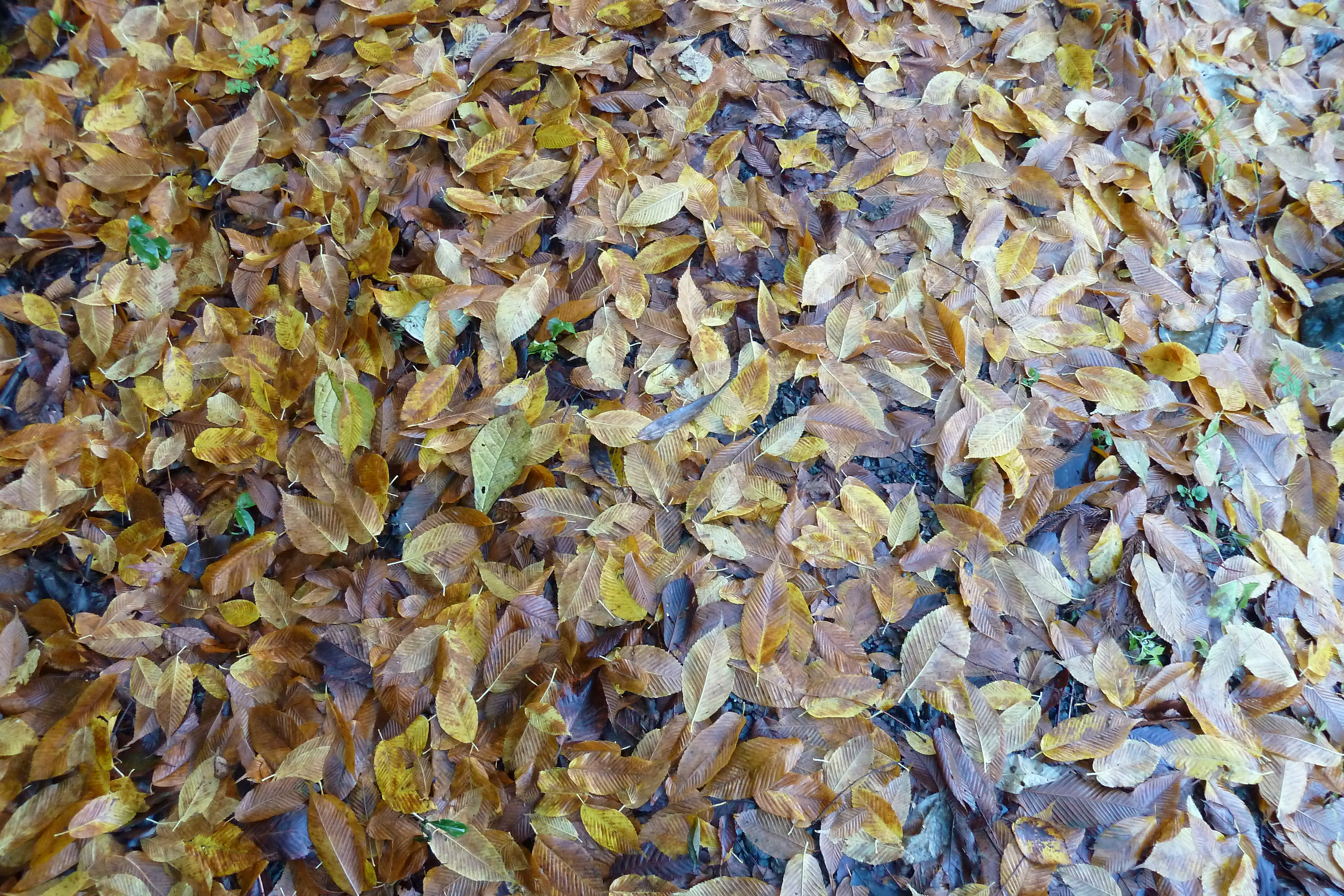

== See also ==
- List of Places of Scenic Beauty of Japan (Gunma)
- List of Places of Scenic Beauty of Japan (Saitama)
