= Tsutsujigaoka Park =

Park in Japan

Coordinates: 36°14′33.2″N 139°33′11.1″E

- 躑躅ヶ岡公園
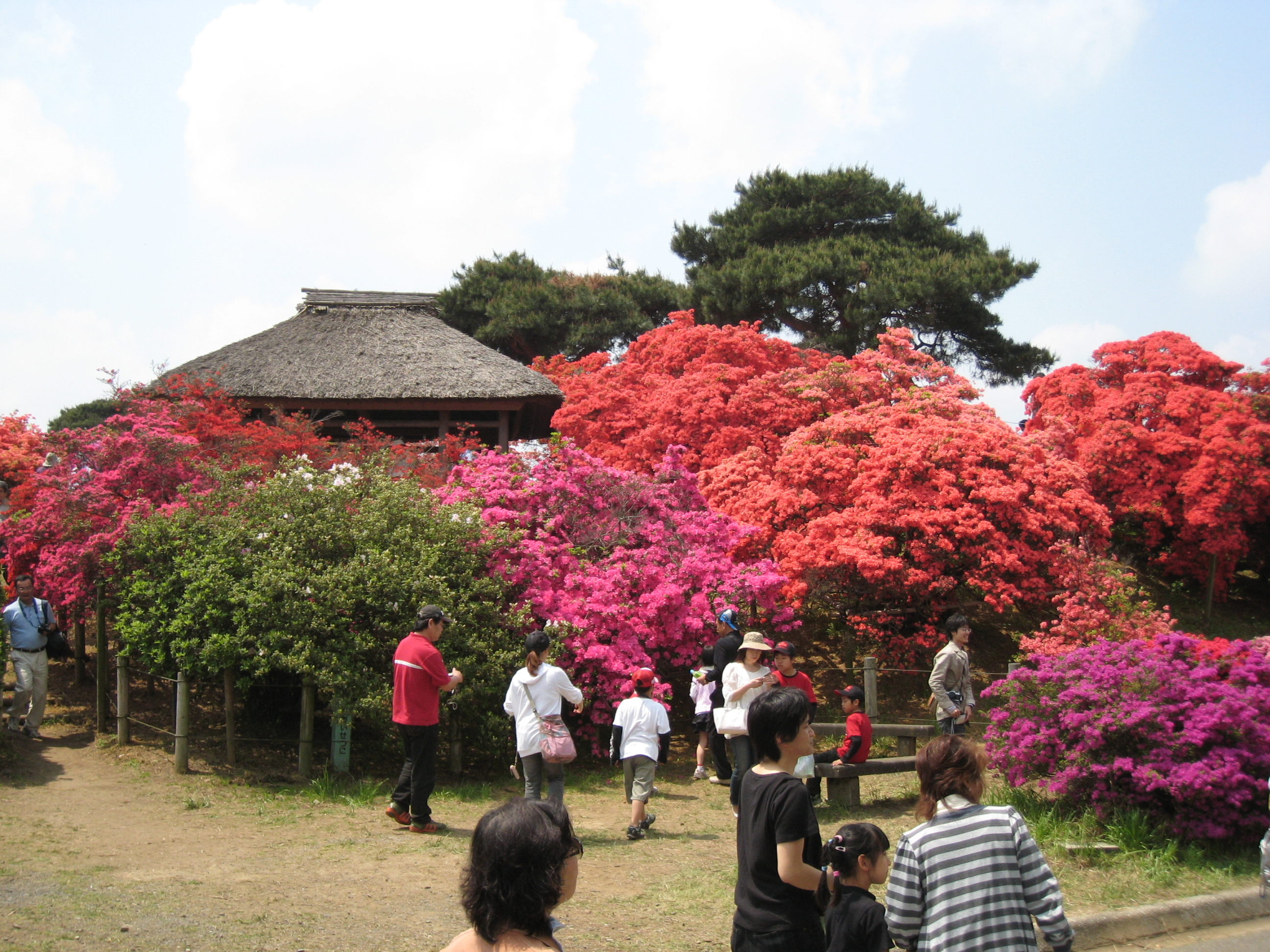
- Tsutsujigaoka Park

- Location within Gunma Prefecture Location within Japan
- Type: Japanese garden
- Location: Tatebayashi, Gunma, Japan
- Area: 49,890 m^{2} (537,000 sq ft)
- Created: Edo period
- Status: Open
- National Palace of Scenic Beauty

The Tsutsujigaoka Park (躑躅ヶ岡公園, Tsutsujigaoka Kōen) is a Japanese garden located in the city of Tatebayashi, Gunma Prefecture, Japan, which is a nationally designated Place of Scenic Beauty. It is also one of then "100 Japanese historical parks" designated in 2006 by the Ministry of Land, Infrastructure, Transport and Tourism to mark the 50th anniversary of the Urban Parks Law.

== Overview ==
This park was originally a garden for the daimyō of Tatebayashi Domain and was constructed in the early Edo period. It contains about 10,000 azalea plants, some of which are over 800 years old and is a popular sightseeing spot in Gunma Prefecture when the plants bloom from late April to early May. The park formerly contained a greenhouse with exotic plants (closed in 2010) and an aquarium (closed in 2015). The park has a total area of 49,890 square meters. It was designated a National Place of Scenic Beauty in 1934.

It is located about 25 minutes on foot from Tatebayashi Station on the Tobu Railway Isesaki Line.

It is featured as the 'ha' card in Jomo Karuta.

== Gallery ==
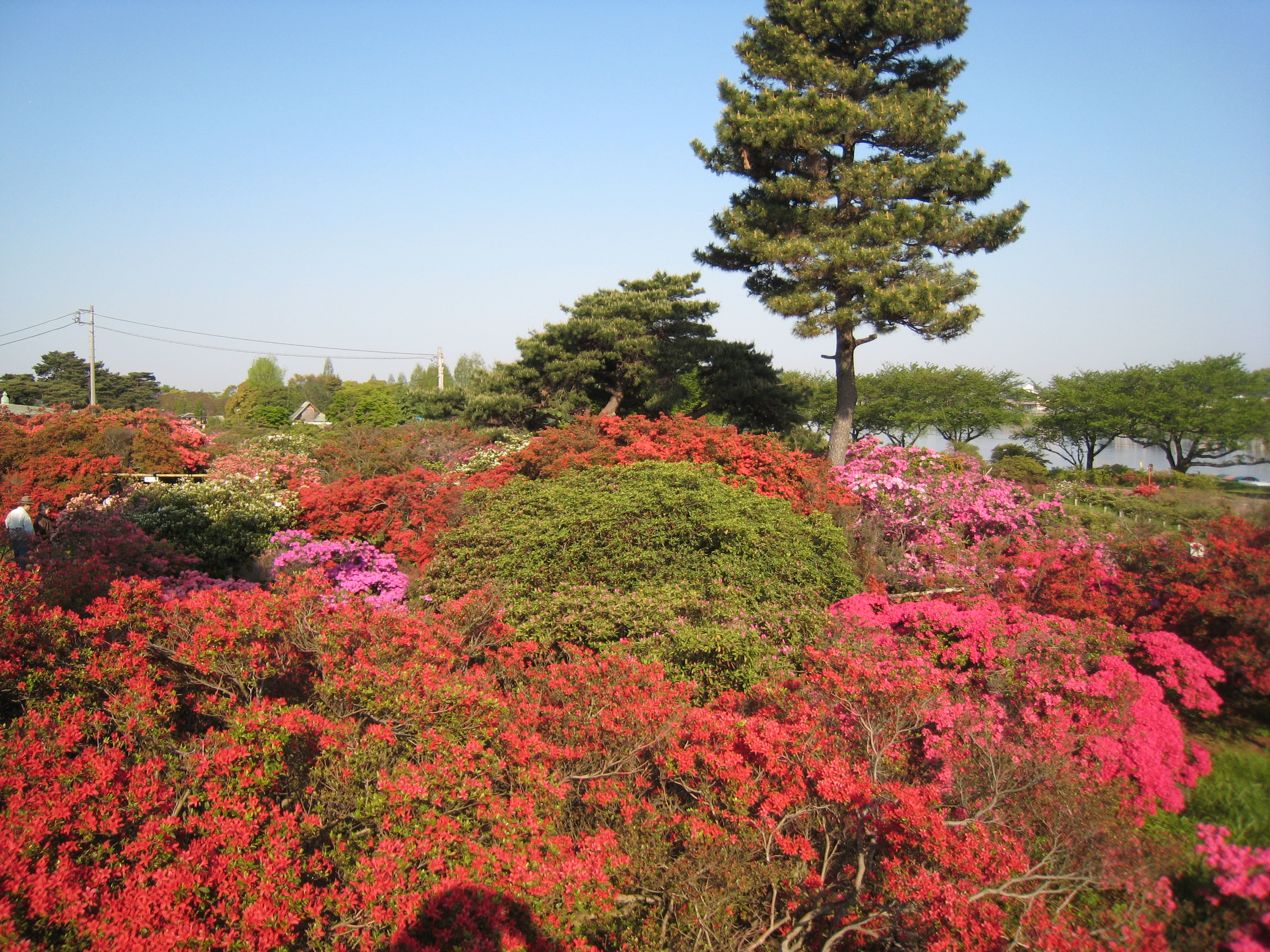

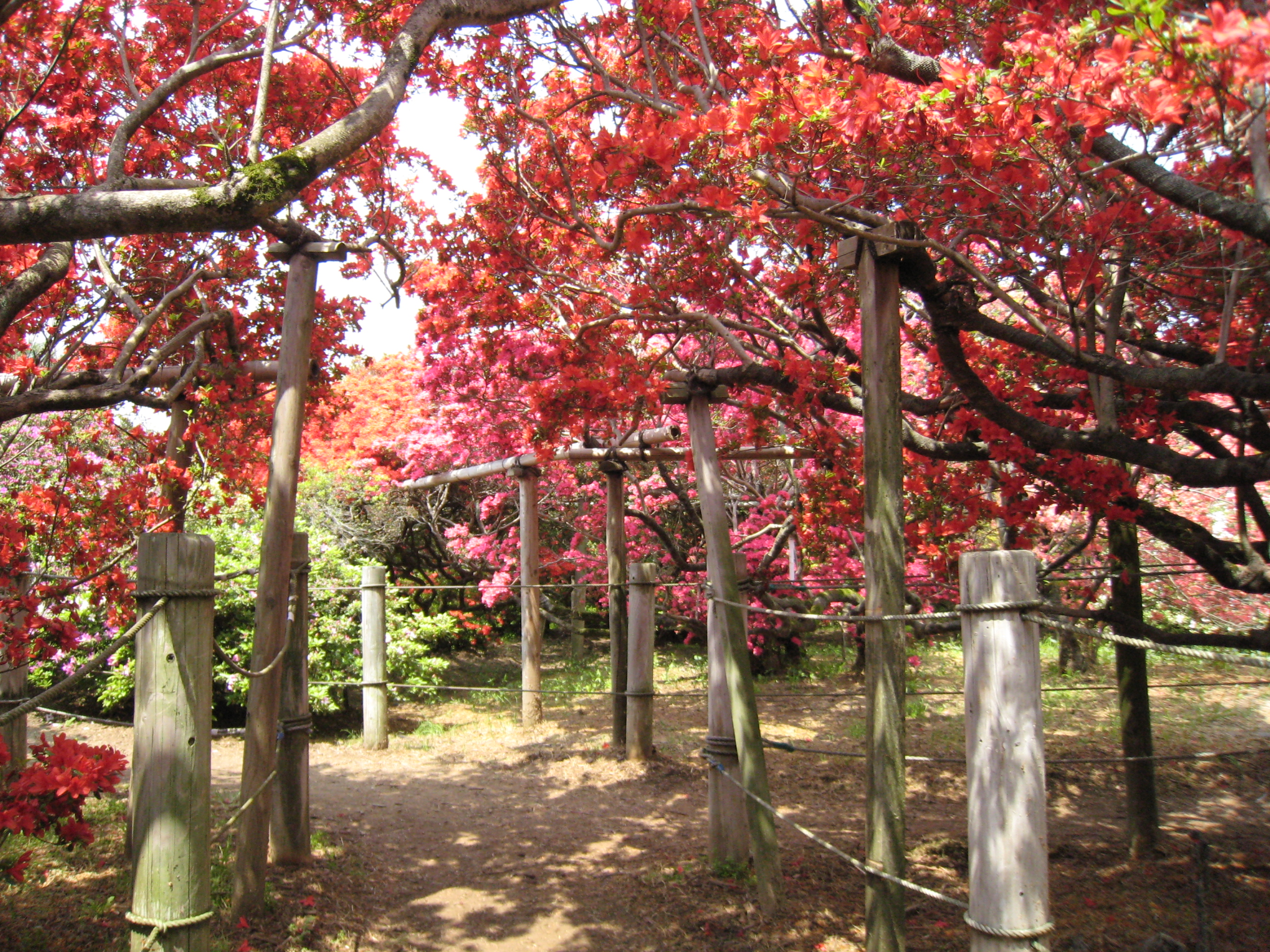

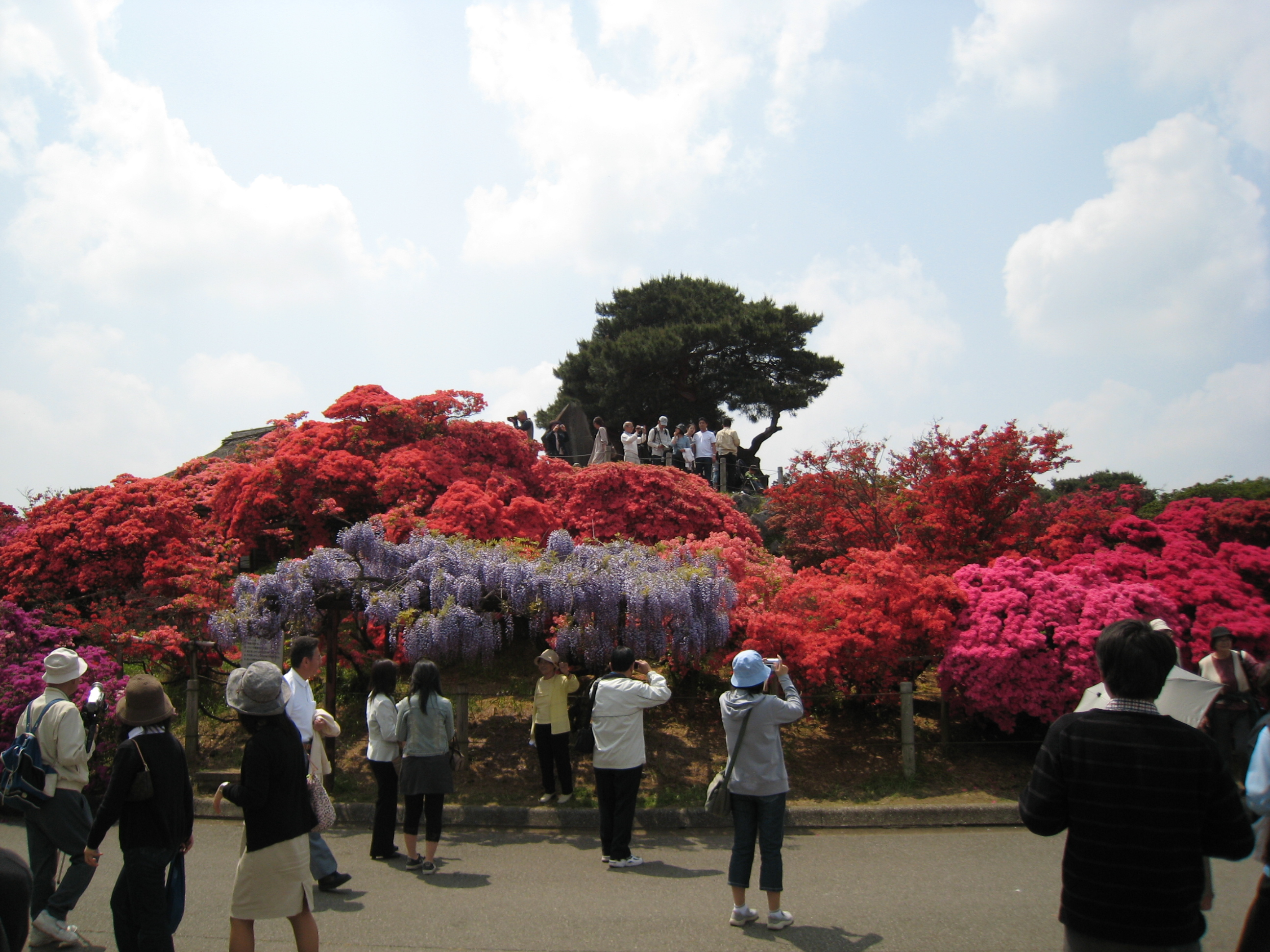

== See also ==
- List of Places of Scenic Beauty of Japan (Gunma)
