= Fukiware Falls =

Fukiware Falls 吹割の滝
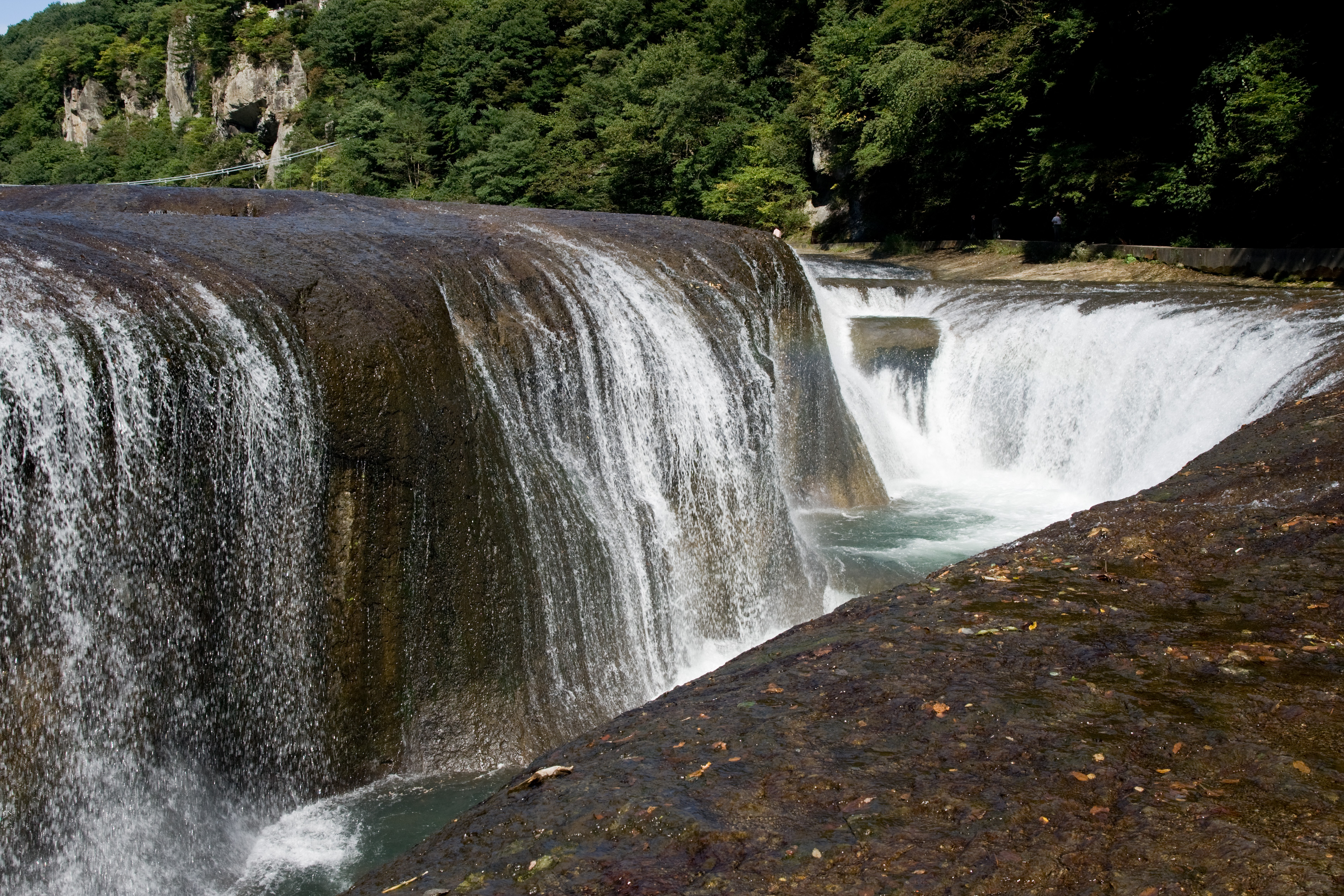

- Location within Gunma Prefecture Location within Japan
- Location: Numata, Gunma Prefecture, Japan
- Coordinates: 36°42′7.8″N 139°12′26.7″E
- Total height: 7 m (23 ft)
- Average width: 30 m (98 ft)
- National Palace of Scenic Beauty Natural Monument

Fukiware Falls (吹割の滝, Fukiware no taki) is a waterfall located in the city of Numata, Gunma Prefecture, Japan. It is a nationally designated Place of Scenic Beauty and a Natural Monument. It is one of "Japan’s Top 100 Waterfalls", per a listing published by the Japanese Ministry of the Environment in 1990.

In Jomo Karuta, it is featured on the 'ta' card.

== Overview ==
The falls are located on the upper reaches of the Katashina River and have a height of 7 metres (23 ft) and width of 30 metres (98 ft). The Katashina River forms a gorge between the confluence of the Hikawa River upstream and the Kurihara River downstream. This is called the Fukiwari Ravine. The falls were created by a large-scale pyroclastic flow caused by a volcanic eruption that occurred 9 million years ago, creating a cliff of tuff with the river flowing from three sides of the cliff. It has been called the "Oriental Niagara" by the Numata City Tourism Board. Downstream, there are many potholes on the riverbed, with a maximum size of 6 to 7 metres (20 to 23 ft) in the long axis, and there are two smaller waterfalls. There is a promenade along the river, and many souvenir shops at the entrance.

Due to the large volume of water at all times, water erosion on the cliff face is severe, and it currently receding at the about seven centimeters upstream in a year.

The falls were used as a backdrop image for the opening credits of the 2000 NHK Taiga drama Aoi.

The falls can be reached in about 30 minutes by car from the Numata Interchange on the Kan'etsu Expressway.

== Gallery ==
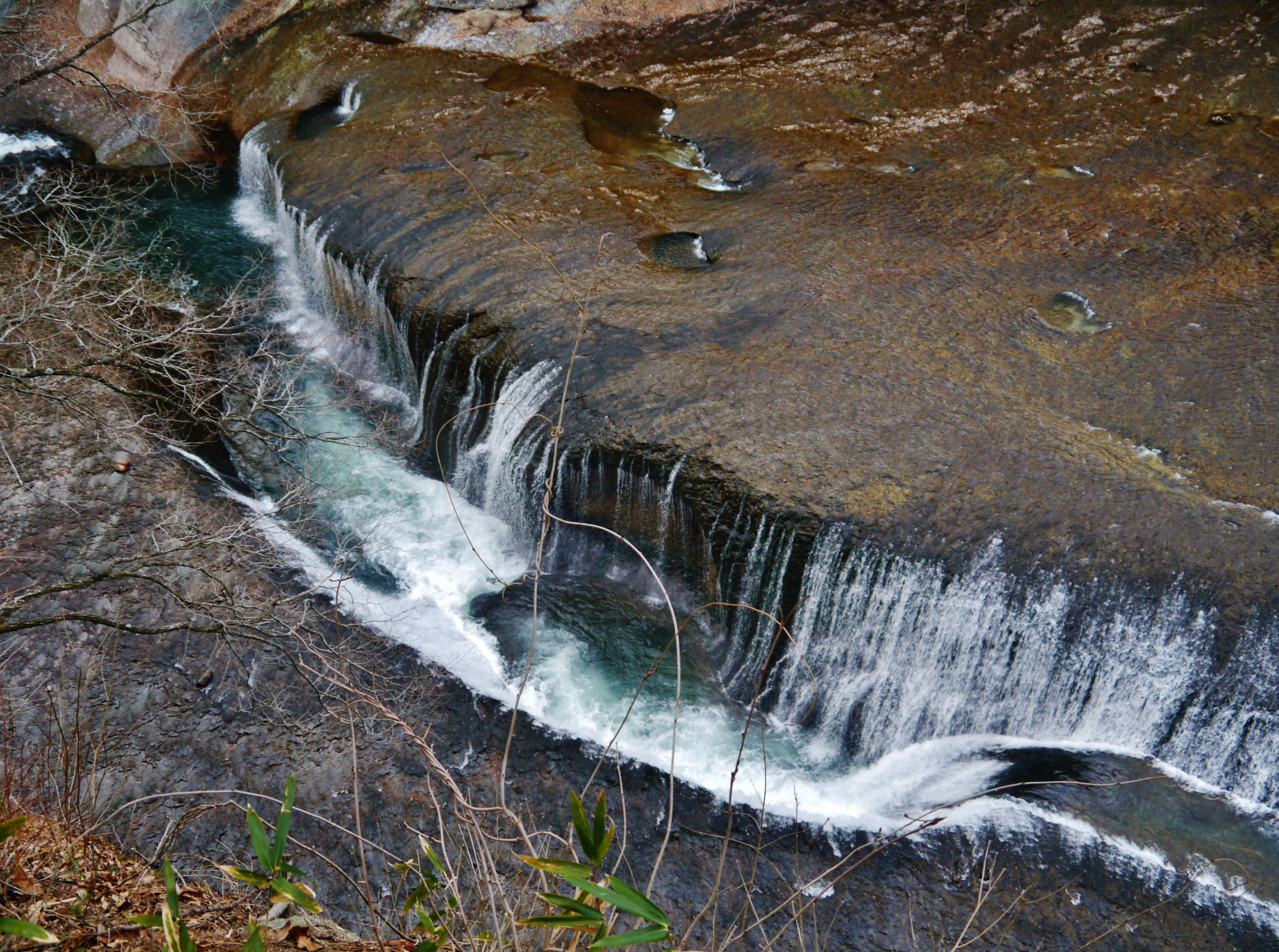

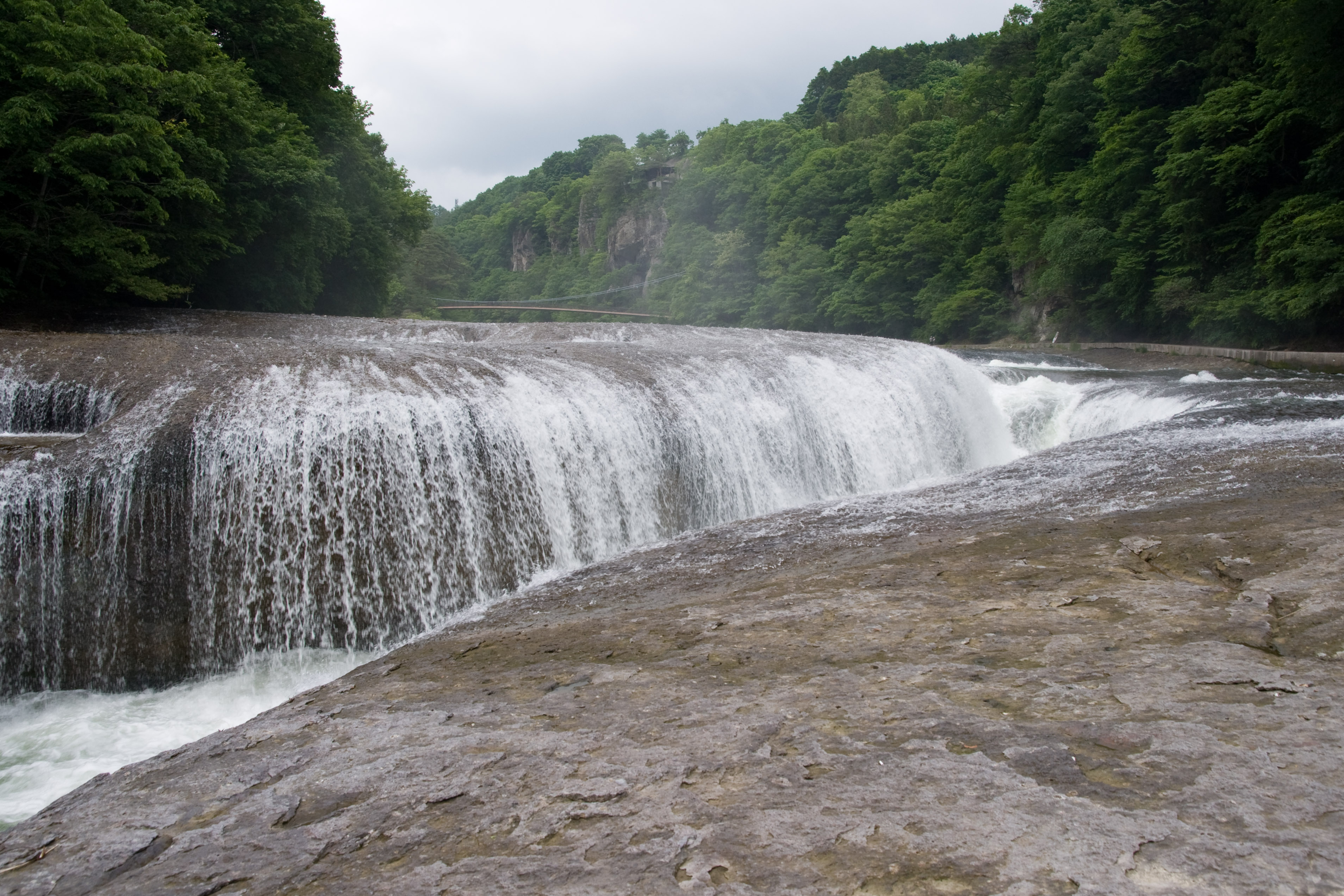

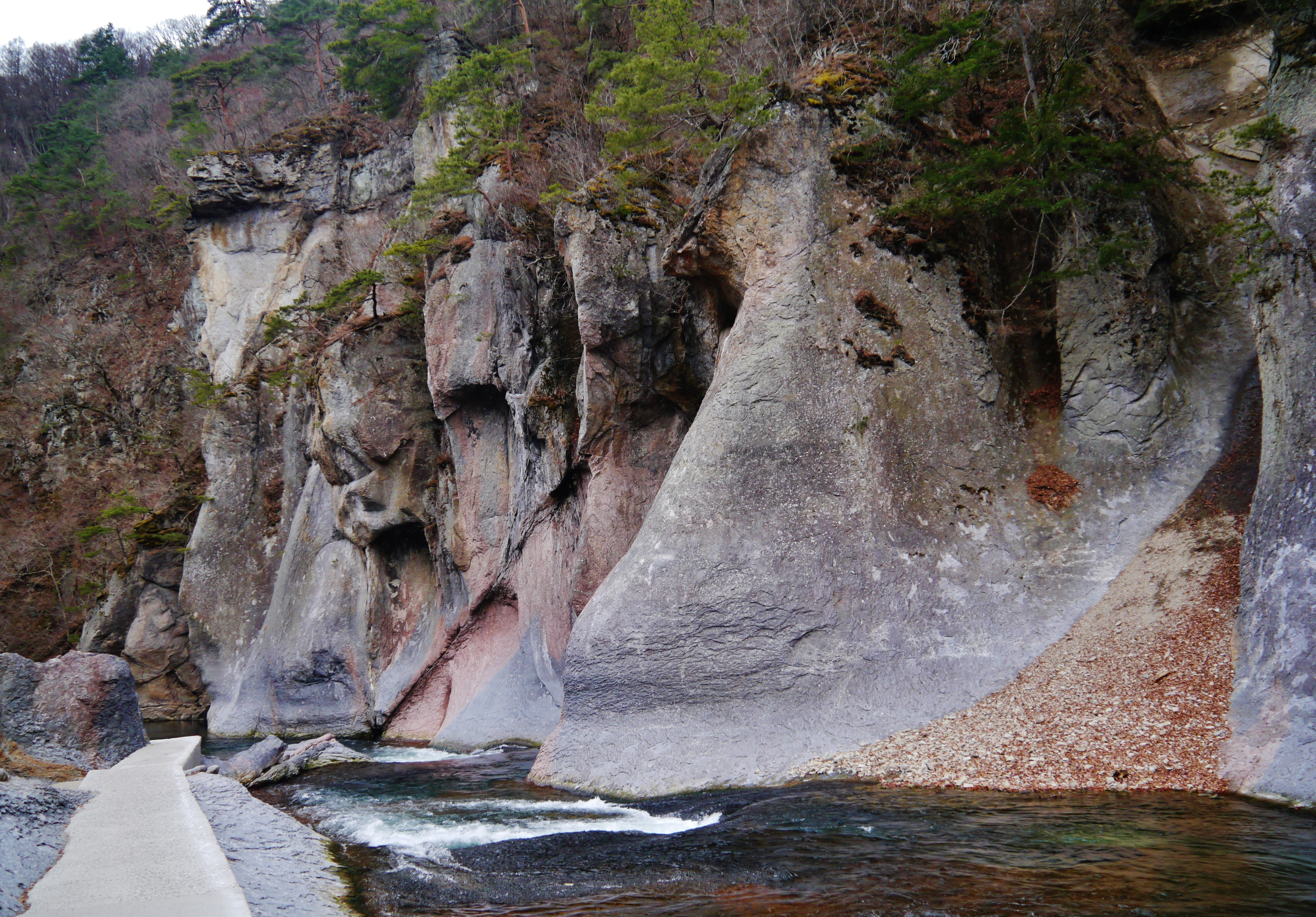

== See also ==
- Japan's Top 100 Waterfalls
- List of Places of Scenic Beauty of Japan (Gunma)
