= Obata Domain =

Feudal domain in Edo period Japan

Obata Domain 小幡藩
- under Tokugawa shogunate Japan
- 1590–1868
- Capital: Obata jin'ya
- Area
  - Coordinates: 36°13′42.48″N 138°54′53.39″E
  - Type: Daimyō
- Historical era: Edo period
  - Established: 1590
  - Disestablished: 1868
- Today part of: part of Gunma Prefecture

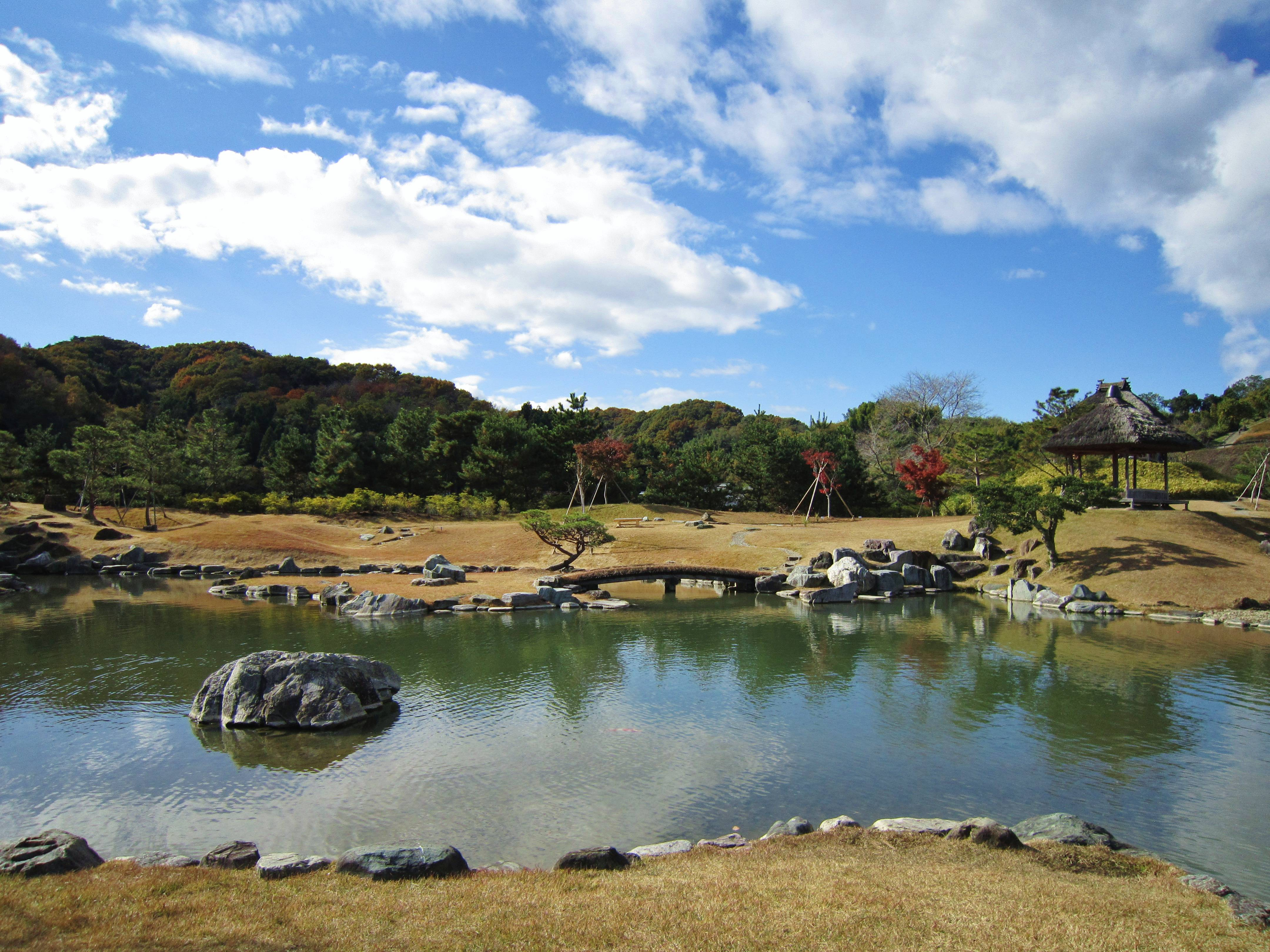
Rakusan-en Konmei Pond, part of the surviving gardens of the jin'ya of Obata Domain

Obata Domain (小幡藩, Obata-han) was a feudal domain under the Tokugawa shogunate of Edo period Japan, located in Kōzuke Province (modern-day Gunma Prefecture), Japan. It was centered on Obata jin'ya in what is now part of the town of Kanra, Gunma. Obata was ruled through part of its history by the Oda clan, descendants of Oda Nobunaga.

== History ==
Obata Domain was originally created in 1590 as a 30,000 koku holding for Okudaira Nobumasa, a son-in-law of Tokugawa Ieyasu. After the Battle of Sekigahara in 1601, he was promoted to the 100,000 koku holding of Kanō in Mino province and Obata was reduced to 10,000 koku and given to Mizuno Tadakiyo, a son of Mizuno Tadashige. For his efforts at the Siege of Osaka, he was transferred to the 20,000 koku Kariya Domain in Mikawa Province in 1615. Nagai Naokatsu, another of Ieyasu’s generals noted for his actions at the Siege of Osaka then briefly ruled from 1616–1617.

In 1617, the domain was awarded to Oda Nobuyoshi, the grandson of Oda Nobunaga, and fourth son of Oda Nobukatsu, daimyō of Uda-Matsuyama Domain in Yamato Province. The Oda clan continued to rule Obata over the next seven generations until 1764, when they were transferred to Takahata Domain in Dewa Province. Obata was then awarded to the Okudaira-branch of the Matsudaira clan, who ruled until the end of the Edo period.

During the Bakumatsu period, the last daimyō, Matsudaira Tadayuki had served as Sōshaban and as Jisha-bugyō, positions which gave him insight into the weakness of the shogunate. Although he donated 500 ryō to support the shogunal military forces, he also made contact with the pro-imperial forces and many of his close advisers were from the radical Mito Domain. He also took steps to modernize his military, even to the extent of selling his prized heirloom Japanese sword to purchase modern rifles. He was quick to join the imperial side in the Boshin War.

After the end of the conflict, with the abolition of the han system in July 1871, Obata Domain became “Obata Prefecture”, which later became part of Gunma Prefecture.

The domain had a population of 889 samurai in 238 households per a census in the Anei period (1772–1780).

== Holdings at the end of the Edo period ==
Unlike most domains in the han system, which consisted of several discontinuous territories calculated to provide the assigned kokudaka, based on periodic cadastral surveys and projected agricultural yields, Obata was a relatively compact territory.

- Kōzuke Province
  - 1 village in Usui District
  - 34 villages in Kanra District
  - 3 villages in Tago District

== List of daimyō ==
#	Name	Tenure	Courtesy title	Court Rank	kokudaka
Okudaira clan (Fudai) 1590–1601
1	Okudaira Nobumasa (奥平 信昌)	1590–1601	Mimasaka-no-kami (美作守)	Junior 5th Rank, Lower Grade (従五位下)	30,000 koku
Mizuno clan (fudai) 1602–1615
1	Mizuno Tadakiyo (水野 忠清)	1602–1615	Hayato-no-kami (隼人正)	Junior 5th Rank, Lower Grade (従五位下)	10,000 koku
Nagai clan (fudai) 1616–1617
1	Nagai Naokatsu (永井 直勝)	1616–1617	Ukon-taifu (右近大夫)	Junior 5th Rank, Lower Grade (従五位下)	17,000 koku
Oda clan (tozama) 1617–1767
1	Oda Nobuyoshi (織田信良)	1617–1626	Sakone-no-shōshō (左少将)	Junior 4th Rank, Lower Grade (従四位下)	20,000 koku
2	Oda Nobumasa (織田信昌)	1626–1650	Hyōbu-taifu (兵部大輔)	Junior 4th Rank, Lower Grade (従四位下)	20,000 koku
3	Oda Nobuhisa (織田信久)	1650–1714	Echizen-no-kami (越前守); Jijū (侍従)	Junior 4th Rank, Lower Grade (従四位下)	20,000 koku
4	Oda Nobunari (織田信就)	1714–1731	Mino-no-kami (美濃守)	Junior 4th Rank, Lower Grade (従四位下); Jijū (侍従)	20,000 koku
5	Oda Nobusuke (織田信右)	1731–1759	Hyōbu-taifu (兵部大輔)	Junior 4th Rank, Lower Grade (従四位下)	20,000 koku
6	Oda Nobutomi (織田信富)	1759–1764	Izumi-no-kami (和泉守)	Junior 5th Rank, Lower Grade (従五位下)	20,000 koku
7	Oda Nobukuni (織田信邦)	1764–1767	Mino-no-kami (美濃守)	Junior 5th Rank, Lower Grade (従五位下)	20,000 koku
Okudaira-Matsudaira clan (fudai) 1767–1872
1	Matsudaira Tadatsune (松平忠恒)	1767–1768	Kunai-shōyū (宮内少輔)	Junior 5th Rank, Lower Grade (従五位下)	20,000 koku
2	Matsudaira Tadayoshi (松平忠福)	1768–1799	Uneme-no-kami (采女正)	Junior 5th Rank, Lower Grade (従五位下)	20,000 koku
3	Matsudaira Tadashige (松平忠恵)	1799–1856	Kunai-shōyū (宮内少輔)	Junior 5th Rank, Lower Grade (従五位下)	20,000 koku
4	Matsudaira Tadayuki (松平忠恕)	1856–1871	Settsu-no-kami (摂津守)	Junior 5th Rank, Lower Grade (従五位下)	20,000 koku

== See also ==
- Rakusan-en
