= List of mergers in Gunma Prefecture =

Here is a list of mergers in Gunma Prefecture, Japan since the Heisei era.

== Mergers from April 1, 1999 to Present ==
- On April 1, 2003 - the town of Manba, and the village of Nakasato (both from Tano District) were merged to create the town of Kanna.
- On December 5, 2004 - the town of Ōgo, and the villages of Kasukawa and Miyagi (all from Seta District) were merged into the expanded city of Maebashi.
- On January 1, 2005 - the old city of Isesaki absorbed the towns of Akabori and Sakai, and the village of Azuma (all from Sawa District) to create the new and expanded city of Isesaki.
- On February 13, 2005 - the villages of Shirasawa and Tone (both from Tone District) were merged into the expanded city of Numata.
- On March 28, 2005 - the old city of Ōta absorbed the towns of Nitta, Ojima and Yabuzukahonmachi (all from Nitta District) to create the new and expanded city of Ōta.
- On June 13, 2005 - the villages of Kurohone and Niisato (both from Seta District) were merged into the expanded city of Kiryū.
- On October 1, 2005 - the town of Tsukiyono and the village of Niiharu (both from Tone District) were merged into the expanded town of Minakami.
- On January 1, 2006 - the town of Onishi (from Tano District) was merged into the expanded city of Fujioka.
- On January 23, 2006 - the towns of Gunma, Kurabuchi and Misato (all from Gunma District), and the town of Shinmachi (from Tano District) were merged into the expanded city of Takasaki.
- On February 20, 2006 - the old city of Shibukawa absorbed the town of Ikaho, the villages of Komochi and Onogami (all from Kitagunma District), and the villages of Akagi and Kitatachibana (both from Seta District) to create the new and expanded city of Shibukawa.
- On March 18, 2006 - the town of Matsuida (from Usui District) was merged into the expanded city of An'naka. Usui District was dissolved as a result of this merger.
- On March 27, 2006 - the town of Ōmama (from Yamada District), the town of Kasakake (from Nitta District), and the village of Azuma (from Seta District) were merged to create the city of Midori. Nitta District and Yamada District were dissolved as a result of this merger.
- On March 27, 2006 - the old city of Tomioka absorbed the town of Myōgi (from Kanra District) to create the new and expanded city of Tomioka.
- On March 27, 2006 - the towns of Agatsuma and Azuma (both from Agatsuma District) were merged to create the town of Higashiagatsuma.
- On October 1, 2006 - the town of Haruna (from Gunma District) was merged into the expanded city of Takasaki. Gunma District was dissolved as a result of this merger.
- On May 5, 2009 - the village of Fujimi (from Seta District) was merged into the expanded city of Maebashi. Seta District was dissolved as a result of this merger.
- On June 1, 2009 - the town of Yoshii (from Tano District) was merged into the expanded city of Takasaki.
- On March 28, 2010 - the village of Kuni (from Agatsuma District) was merged into the expanded town of Nakanojō.
