= Yoshioka, Gunma =

Yoshioka 吉岡町
- Town
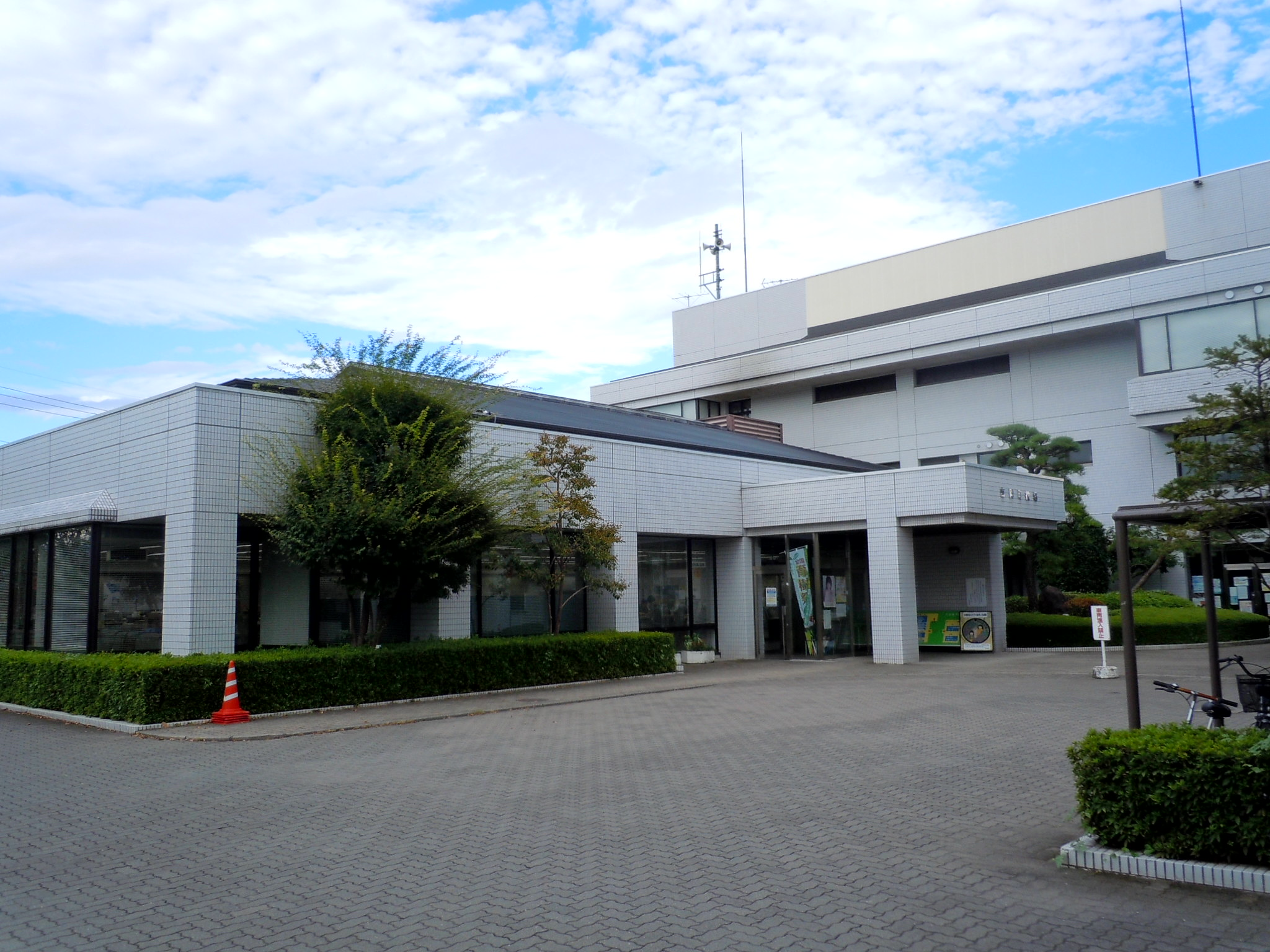
- Yoshioka town office

- Flag Seal

- Location of Yoshioka in Gunma Prefecture

- Coordinates: 36°26′50.8″N 139°0′34.9″E
- Country: Japan
- Region: Kantō
- Prefecture: Gunma
- District: Kitagunma

Area
  - Total: 20.46 km^{2} (7.90 sq mi)

Population (September 2020)
  - Total: 21,749
  - Density: 1,063/km^{2} (2,753/sq mi)
- Time zone: UTC+9 (Japan Standard Time)
- Tree: Ginkgo biloba
- Flower: Chrysanthemum
- Bird: Skylark
- Phone number: 0279-54-3111
- Address: 560 Shimonoda, Yoshioka-machi, Kitagunma-gun, Gunma-ken 370-3692
- Website: Official website

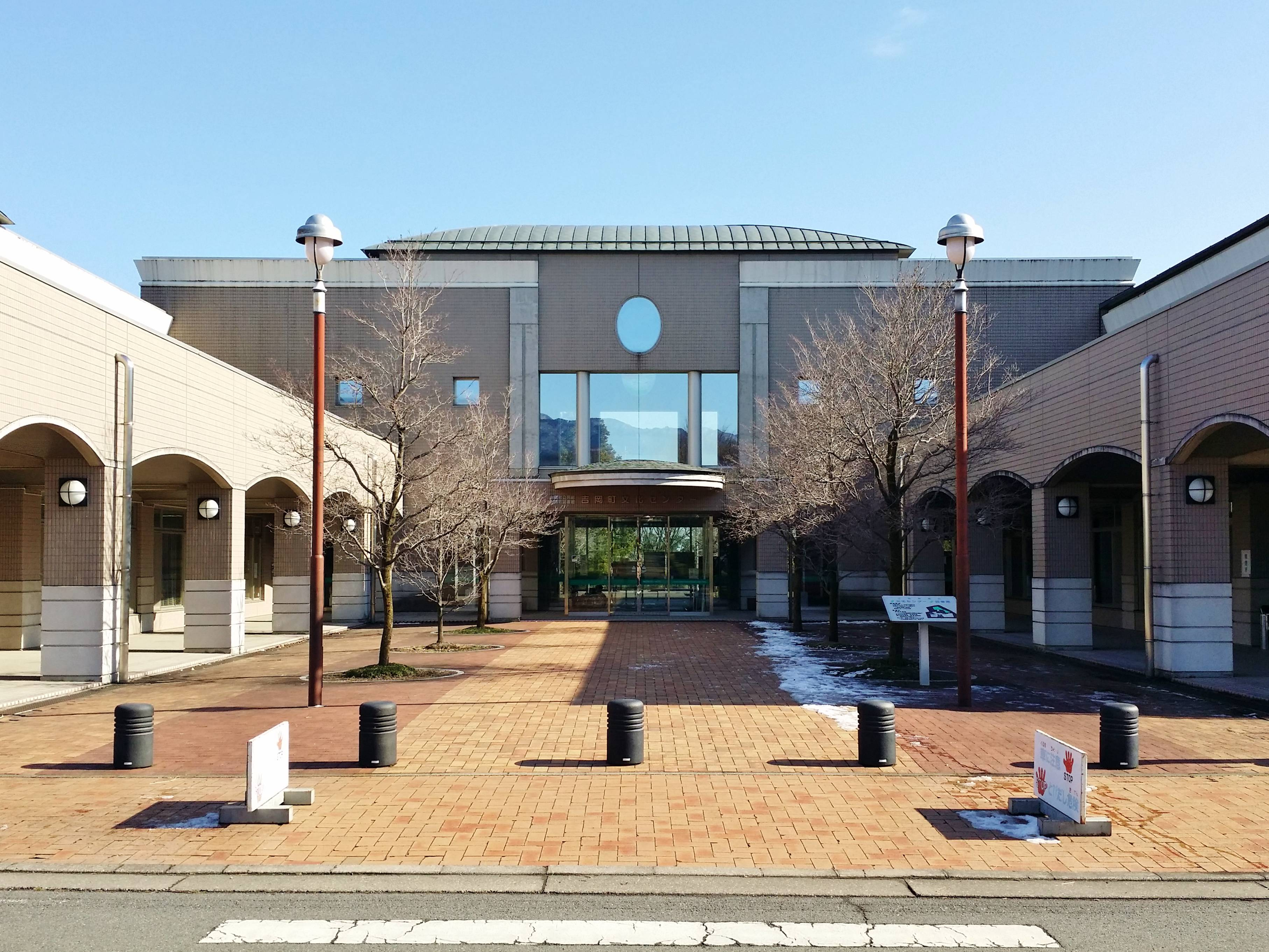
Yoshioka Town Culture Center

Yoshioka (吉岡町, Yoshioka-machi) is a town located in Gunma Prefecture, Japan. As of 1 September 2020, the town had an estimated population of 21,749 in 8,311 households, and a population density of 1100 persons per km^{2}. The total area of the town is 20.46 square kilometres (7.90 sq mi).

== Geography ==
Located in central Gunma, Yoshioka sits between the southeastern slopes of Mount Haruna and the Tone River region. The western half of the town has an elevation between 200 and 900 meters, while the eastern half is mostly flat, with an elevation between 100 and 200 meters.

=== Surrounding municipalities ===
Gunma Prefecture

- Maebashi
- Shibukawa
- Shintō

=== Climate ===
Yoshioka has a humid continental climate (Köppen Cfa) characterized by warm summers and cold winters with heavy snowfall. The average annual temperature in Yoshioka is 13.8 °C. The average annual rainfall is 1281 mm with September as the wettest month. The temperatures are highest on average in August, at around 26.1 °C, and lowest in January, at around 2.4 °C.

== Demographics ==
Per Japanese census data, the population of Yoshioka has increased steadily over the past 60 years.

Historical population
Year	Pop.	±%
1920	7,785	—
1930	8,143	+4.6%
1940	8,390	+3.0%
1950	10,081	+20.2%
1960	9,231	−8.4%
1970	9,432	+2.2%
1980	11,501	+21.9%
1990	13,672	+18.9%
2000	16,504	+20.7%
2010	19,801	+20.0%
2020	21,792	+10.1%

== History ==
Komayose village and Meiji village were established within Nishigunma District, Gunma Prefecture on April 1, 1889 with the creation of the modern municipalities system after the Meiji Restoration. In 1896, Nishigunma District was united with Kataoka District to create Gunma District, which was subsequently divided in 1949 with Komayose and Meiji villages becoming part of Kitagunma District. On April 1, 1955 the two villages were merged to form Yoshioka village, which was elevated to town status on April 1, 1991.

== Government ==
Yoshioka has a mayor-council form of government with a directly elected mayor and a unicameral town council of 14 members. Yoshioka and neighboring Shintō contribute one member to the Gunma Prefectural Assembly. In terms of national politics, the town is part of Gunma 5th district of the lower house of the Diet of Japan.

== Economy ==
Yoshioka is largely a commuter town, with over 44% of the workforce commuting to nearby Maebashi.

== Education ==
Yoshioka has two public elementary schools and one public middle school operated by the town government. The town does not have a high school.

== Transportation ==
=== Railway ===
Yoshioka is not served by any railway services. The nearest stations are Yagihara in the city of Shibukawa to the north and Gumma-Sōja in the city of Maebashi to the south.

=== Highway ===
- Kan-etsu Expressway – Komayose PA, Komayose IC
- National Route 17 – Maebashi-Shibukawa Bypass
