= Ikaho, Gunma =

Dissolved municipality in Gunma prefecture, Japan

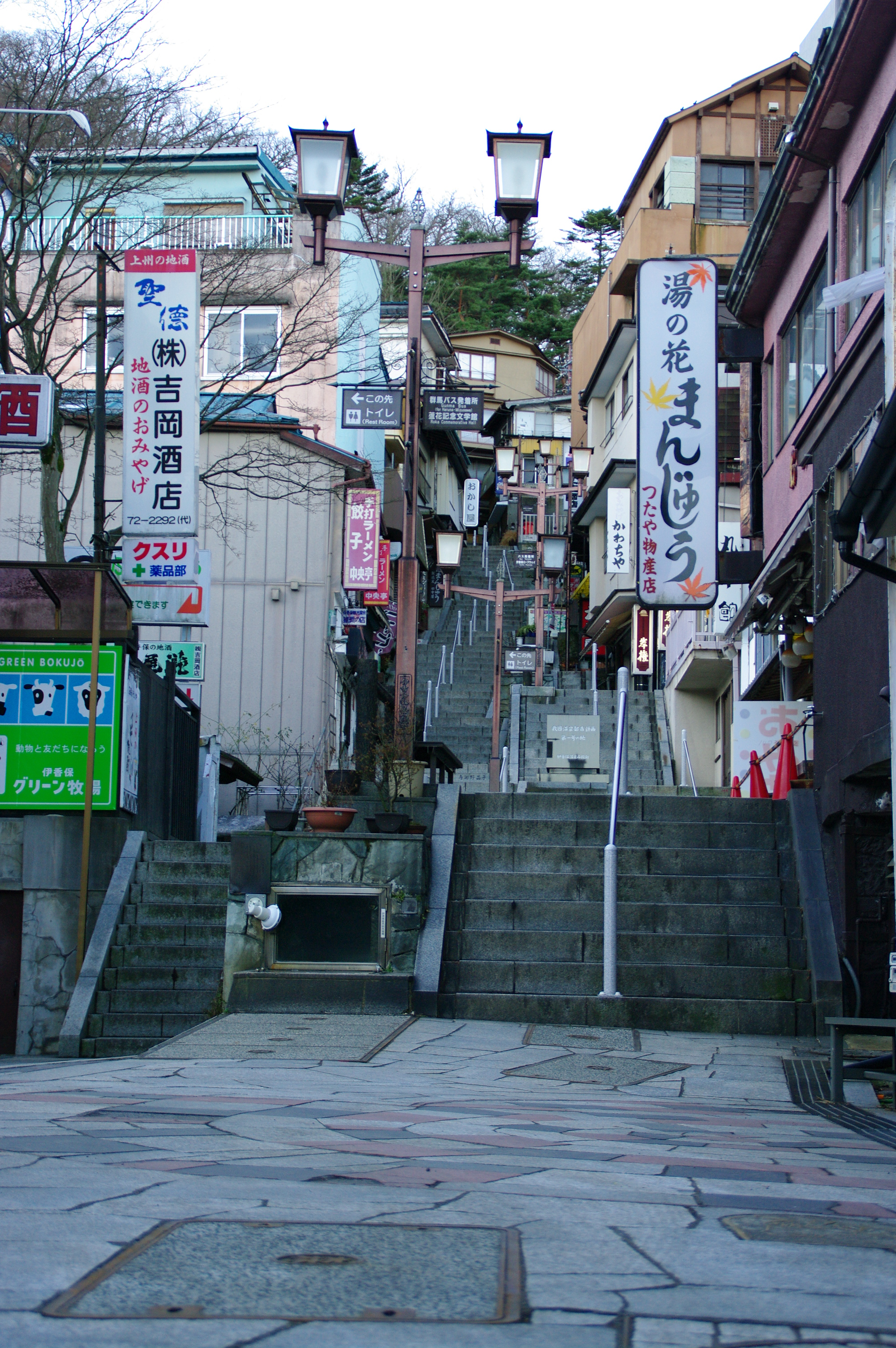
Ikaho Onsen

Ikaho (伊香保町, Ikaho-machi) was a town located in Kitagunma District, Gunma Prefecture, Japan.

As of 2003, the town had an estimated population of 3,920 and a density of 175.63 persons per km^{2}. The total area was 22.32 km^{2}.

On February 20, 2006, Ikaho, along with the villages of Komochi and Onogami (all in Kitagunma District), and the villages of Akagi and Kitatachibana (both in Seta District), was merged into the expanded city of Shibukawa.

Situated on the slopes of Mount Haruna, an extinct volcano, Ikaho is well known for its hot springs.

Ikaho is 2.5 hours from Shinjuku by express bus, and can be easily enjoyed on a day trip from Tokyo

== Onsen (Hot springs) ==
Ikaho Onsen is one of Gunma's 4 large onsen. This makes it one of the main onsen locations in Japan.

The onsen locations are usually open during weekdays, from 09:00 AM to 06:00 PM

Ikaho Onsen has been called Kogane-no-Yu (The Golden Waters), but the waters used to be clear and colorless. However, due to the iron content, they turned dark brown when in contact with the air. They are also known as Kodakara-no-Yu (Child Waters) since they tend to be mild, warm the body from inside and are popular with women.

== History ==
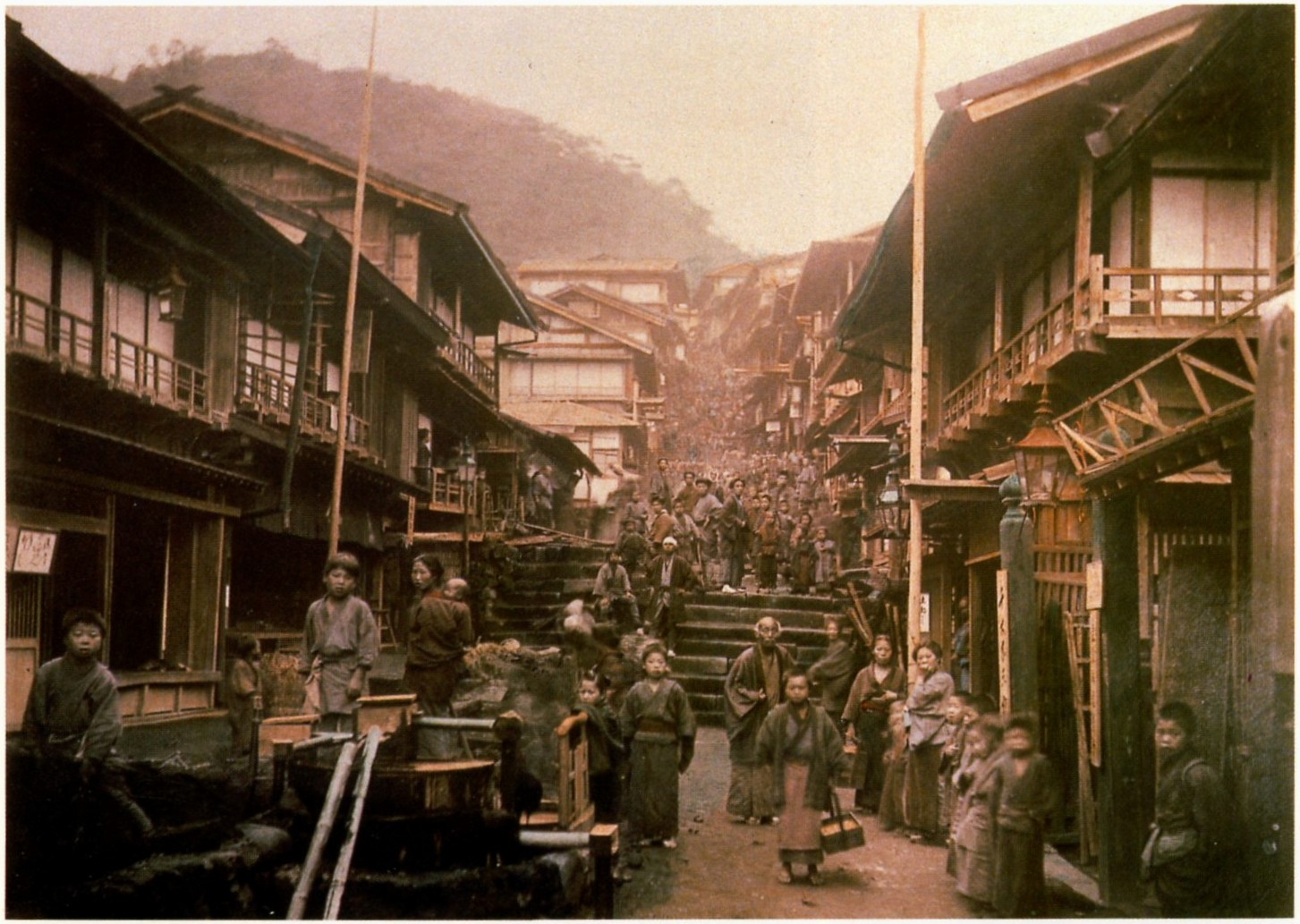
Ikaho Onsen Ishidangai around 1890

- 1889 - Ikaho town is created in Nishigunma District by the uniting of the villages of Ikaho, Mizusawa, and Yunakako.
- 1896 - Nishigunma District merges with Kataoka District and is renamed Gunma District.
- 1949 - Kitagunma District, including Ikaho town, separates from Gunma District.
- 1997 - Hilo, Hawaii becomes a sister city.
- February 20, 2006 - Ikaho, along with the villages of Komochi and Onogami (all from Kitagunma District), and the villages of Akagi and Kitatachibana (both from Seta District), was merged into the expanded city of Shibukawa.

== Notable places ==
- Mount Haruna
- Ikaho Hot Springs
- Mizusawa temple
- Yumeji Takehisa Memorial Museum
- Roka Tokutomi Memorial Literature Museum
- Art Museum

== In popular media ==
- The town of Ikaho serves as the location for the setting of the sports manga series Initial D.
- A village modelled after Ikaho is also a location of the manga and anime Dandadan.
