= Akagi, Gunma =

Dissolved municipality in Gunma prefecture, Japan

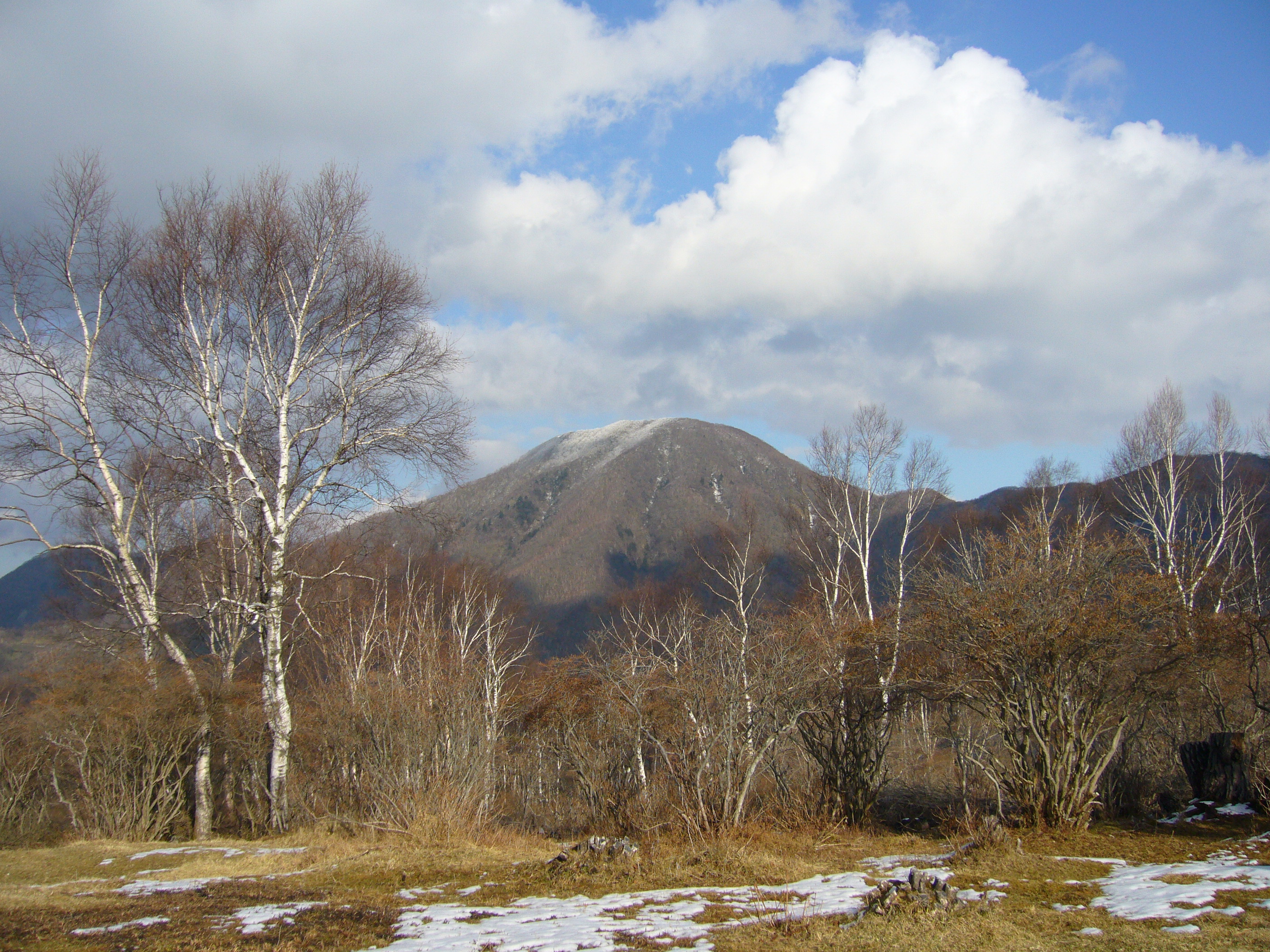
Mount Akagi

Akagi (赤城村, Akagi-mura) was a village located in Seta District, Gunma Prefecture, Japan.

As of 2003, the village had an estimated population of 12,184 and a density of 155.63 persons per km^{2}. The total area was 78.29 km^{2}.

On February 20, 2006, Akagi, along with the town of Ikaho, the villages of Komochi and Onogami (all from Kitagunma District), and the village of Kitatachibana (also from Seta District), was merged into the expanded city of Shibukawa.

== Geography ==
- Mountains: Mount Akagi
- Rivers: Tone River

== History ==
- 1889 - the villages of Yokono and Shikishima were created in Minamiseta District.
- 1896 - Minamiseta District is merged into Higashiseta District, renamed Seta District.
- 1956 - the villages of Yokono and Shikishima merged to form the village of Akagi.
- February 20, 2006 - Akagi, along with the town of Ikaho, the villages of Komochi and Onogami (all from Kitagunma District), and the village of Kitatachibana (also from Seta District), was merged into the expanded city of Shibukawa.

== Heritage ==
There is a Kabuki stage that was constructed about 200 years ago. Occasionally, Kabuki is performed on that stage.

== Popular culture ==
Akagi is the home of the fictional Takahashi Brothers (street racers who drive two generations of the Mazda RX-7) from the hit manga and anime series Initial D, and serves as the home course of the Akagi Redsuns (later reformed as Project D).
