= Kitatachibana, Gunma =

Dissolved municipality in Gunma prefecture, Japan

Kitatachibana (北橘村, Kitatachibana-mura) was a village located in Seta District, Gunma Prefecture, Japan.

As of 2003, the village had an estimated population of 10,205 and a density of 540.23 persons per km^{2}. The total area was 18.89 km^{2}.

On February 20, 2006, Kitatachibana, along with the town of Ikaho, the villages of Komochi and Onogami (all from Kitagunma District), and the village of Akagi (also from Seta District), was merged into the expanded city of Shibukawa.

Although it was officially referred to as "Kitatachibana Village", the local residents commonly used the alternate pronunciation "Hokkitsu". With the 2006 merger, the "Kitatachibana" pronunciation was discarded, and the "Hokkitsu" pronunciation instated as the official one of this district of the new Shibukawa City.
