= Kayano Site =

Archaeological site in Shintō, Japan

Kayano ruins
- 茅野遺跡 (Japanese)
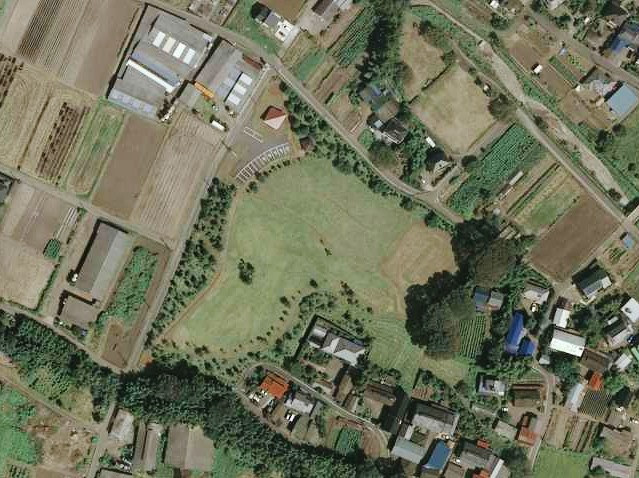
- Aerial view of the Kayano ruins

- Kayano ruins Kayano Site (Japan)
- 36°27′16″N 138°58′41″E
- Type: settlement
- Periods: Jōmon period
- Location: Shintō, Gunma, Japan
- Region: Kantō region

Site notes
- Area: 12,125.84 m^{2} (130,521.5 sq ft)
- Discovered: 1985
- Public access: Yes (Museum near site)

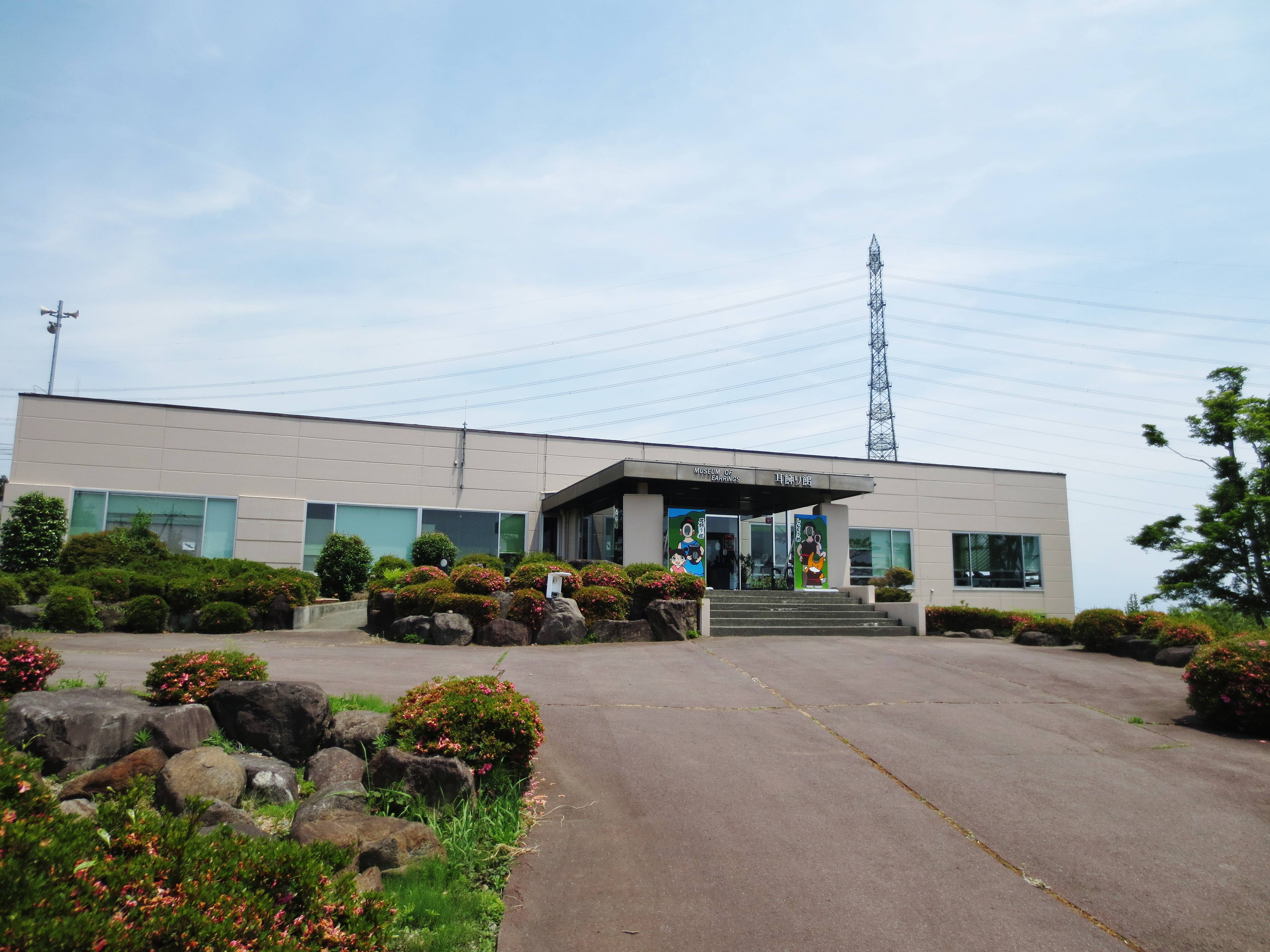
Shintō Village Museum of Earrings

The Kayano ruins (茅野遺跡, Kayano iseki) is an archaeological site with the ruins of a late Jōmon period settlement located in what is now the village of Shintō in the Gunma Prefecture in the northern Kantō region, Japan. The site was designated a National Historic Site of Japan in 1987.

== Overview ==
The site is located at the southeastern foot of Mōunt Soma, one of the outliers of Mount Haruna in central Gunma. It was discovered in 1989 in conjunction with an agricultural land improvement project. As the site is located on a slope, it was found to be in a relatively good and undisturbed condition. In an excavation survey conducted from 1989 to 1990, well-preserved foundations of numerous pit dwellings, tombs, and artifacts such as Jōmon pottery shards, stone tools, clay figurines, magatama, candle-shaped earthen lamps, and 577 earthenware earrings were excavated. It was determined from these artifacts that this was a large-scale settlement from the first half of the late Jōmon period (approximately 2500 to 3000 years ago). Of particular interest were the earthenware earrings, many of which were pulley-shaped, and colored in red or black. A dogū clay figurine depicting a person wearing these earrings was also discovered. The presence of so many examples indicates that this location may have been a production site, and that the earrings were used as trade goods with other regions.

In 1992, 1950 pieces of the excavated items were designated as a National Important Cultural Property., and the ruins were designated as a National Historic Site in 2000. The site is now a park, and the excavated remains are stored in the nearby Shintō Village Museum of Earrings (榛東村耳飾り館, Shintōmura Mimikazari-kan), established in 1992. The museum and site are located about 25 minutes by car from the Maebashi Interchange on the Kan'etsu Expressway.

== See also ==
- List of Historic Sites of Japan (Gunma)
