= Fujimi =

In Japan, Fujimi (富士見) is a common place name which means Mt. Fuji is viewable. It may refer to:

== Places in Japan ==
- Fujimi, Saitama, a city
- Fujimi, Nagano, a town
- Fujimi, Gunma, a village
- Fujimi, a subdivision within Chiyoda, Tokyo

== Companies ==
- Fujimi Shobo, a Japanese publisher
- Fujimi Mokei, a Japanese plastic model manufacturer
