= Shintō, Gunma =

Shintō 榛東村
- Village
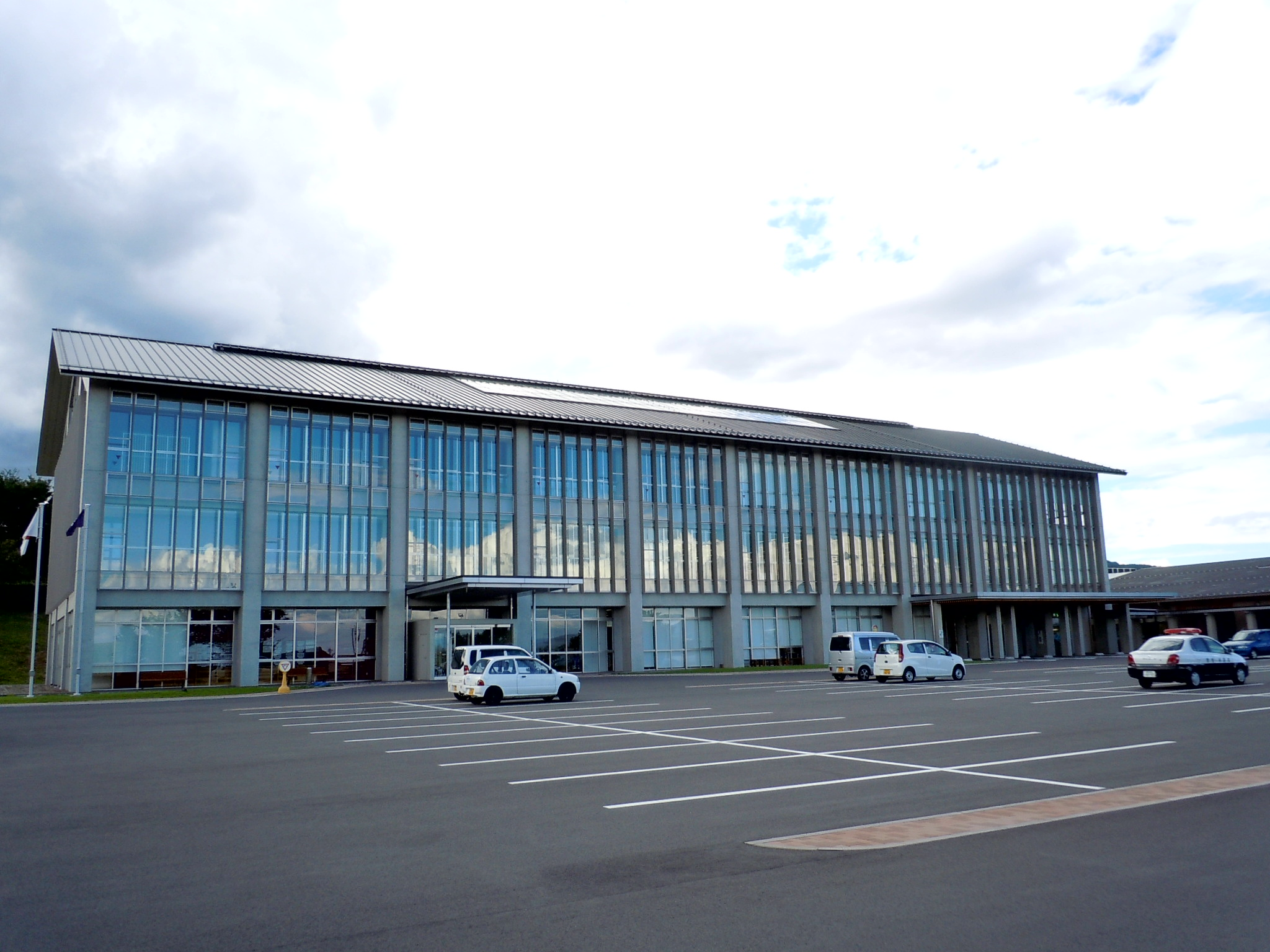
- Shintō village office

- Flag Seal

- Location of Shintō in Gunma Prefecture

- Coordinates: 36°26′18.18″N 138°58′1.7″E
- Country: Japan
- Region: Kantō
- Prefecture: Gunma
- District: Kitagunma

Area
  - Total: 27.92 km^{2} (10.78 sq mi)

Population (August 2020)
  - Total: 14,653
  - Density: 524.8/km^{2} (1,359/sq mi)
- Time zone: UTC+9 (Japan Standard Time)
- Symbols
  - Tree: Cryptomeria
  - Flower: Lilium auratum
  - Bird: Japanese bush-warbler
- Phone number: 0279-54-2211
- Address: 1258-1 Yamakoda, Shintō-mura, Kitagunma-gun, Gunma-ken 370-3593
- Website: Official website

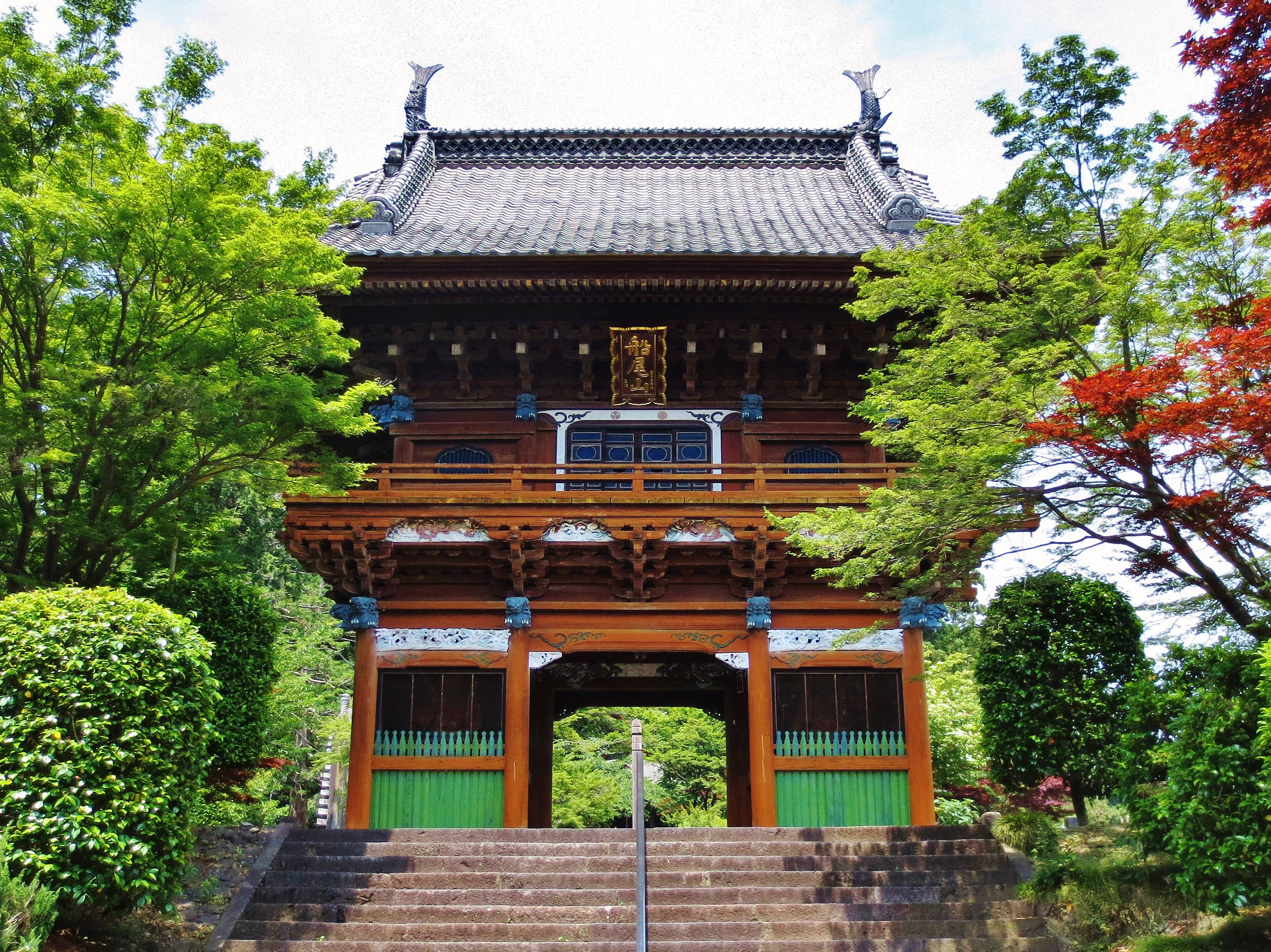
Ryutaku-ji

Shintō (榛東村, Shintō-mura) is a village located in Gunma Prefecture, Japan. As of 31 August 2020, the village had an estimated population of 15,653 in 5,942 households, and a population density of 520 persons per km^{2}. The total area of the village is 27.92 square kilometres (10.78 sq mi).

== Geography ==
Located in central Gunma, Shintō sits between the slopes of Mount Haruna and the Tone River region.

=== Surrounding municipalities ===
Gunma Prefecture

- Maebashi
- Shibukawa
- Takasaki
- Yoshioka

=== Climate ===
Shintō has a humid subtropical climate (Köppen Cfa) characterized by warm summers and cold winters with heavy snowfall. The average annual temperature in Shintō is 12.1 °C. The average annual rainfall is 1282 mm with September as the wettest month. The temperatures are highest on average in August, at around 24.8 °C, and lowest in January, at around 0.4 °C.

== Demographics ==
Per Japanese census data, the population of Shintō has recently plateaued after a long period of growth.

Historical population
Year	Pop.	±%
1960	8,498	—
1970	8,600	+1.2%
1980	10,030	+16.6%
1990	11,358	+13.2%
2000	13,334	+17.4%
2010	14,370	+7.8%
2020	14,216	−1.1%

== History ==
The area of present-day Shintō contains numerous kofun burial mounds from the 6th century. On April 1, 1889, with the creation of the modern municipalities system after the Meiji Restoration, Momonoi village was established within Nishigunma District, Gunma. In 1896, Nishigunma District was united with Kataoka District to create Gunma District, which was subsequently divided in 1949 with Momonoi village becoming part of Kitagunma District. The village was the scene of the Girard incident in 1957, in which an American soldier stationed at Shintō shot and killed a Japanese civilian, sparking a jurisdictional dispute between the Japanese and American governments. In 1957, a portion of Sōma village was merged with Momonoi village. Momonoi was renamed Shintō on August 1, 1959.

== Economy ==
Traditionally, the economy of Shintō was heavily dependent on agriculture; however, the area has developed into a bedroom community for neighboring Takasaki and Maebashi. The village also hosts JGSDF Camp Soumagahara, home of the Japan Ground Self-Defense Force JGSDF 12th Brigade.

== Government ==
Shintō has a mayor-council form of government with a directly elected mayor and a unicameral village council of 14 members. Shintō and neighboring Yoshioka contribute one member to the Gunma Prefectural Assembly. In terms of national politics, the village is part of Gunma 5th district of the lower house of the Diet of Japan.

== Education ==
Shintō has two public elementary schools and one public middle school operated by the town government. The village does not have a high school.

== Transportation ==
Shintō is not served by any railway services. The nearest station is Gumma-Sōja in the city of Maebashi to the south. Shintō is not served by any national highways.

== Local attractions ==
- Kayano site, a National Historic Site
