= Niisato =

Niisato may refer to two villages, both of which have been merged with neighboring towns:

- Niisato, Gunma
- Niisato, Iwate
