= Kurohone =

Kurohone may refer to:

- Kurohone, Gunma, village in Japan
- 6276 Kurohone, a minor planet
