= Shibukawa, Gunma =

Shibukawa 渋川市
- City
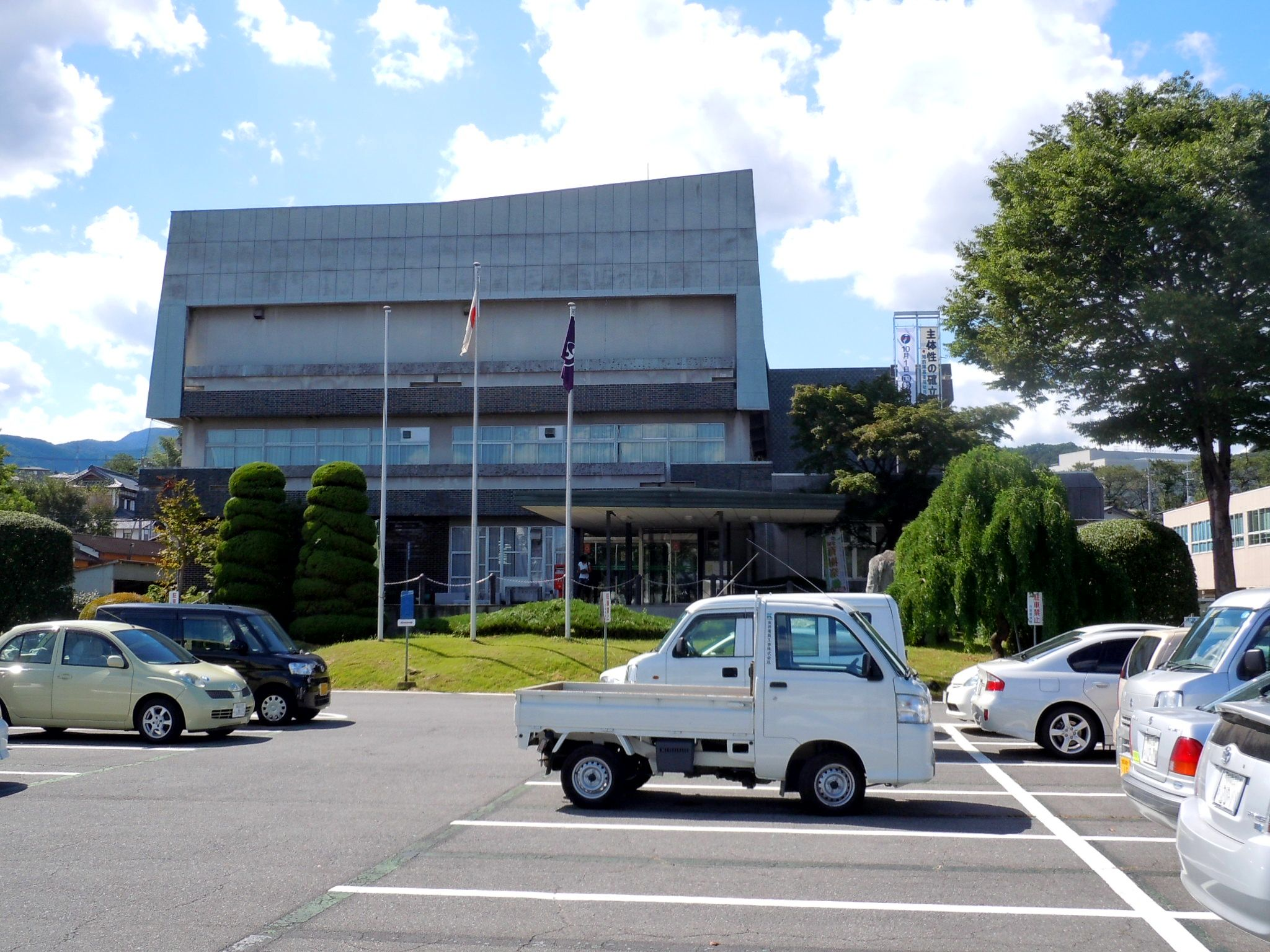
- Shibukawa city hall

- Flag Seal

- Location of Shibukawa in Gunma Prefecture

- Coordinates: 36°23′22″N 139°03′48″E
- Country: Japan
- Region: Kantō
- Prefecture: Gunma

Area
  - Total: 240.27 km^{2} (92.77 sq mi)

Population (August 31, 2020)
  - Total: 76,098
  - Density: 316.72/km^{2} (820.30/sq mi)
- Time zone: UTC+9 (Japan Standard Time)
- Tree: Maple
- Flower: Hydrangea
- Phone number: 0279-22-2111
- Address: 80 Ishihara, Shibukawa-shi, Gunma-ken 377-8501
- Website: Official website

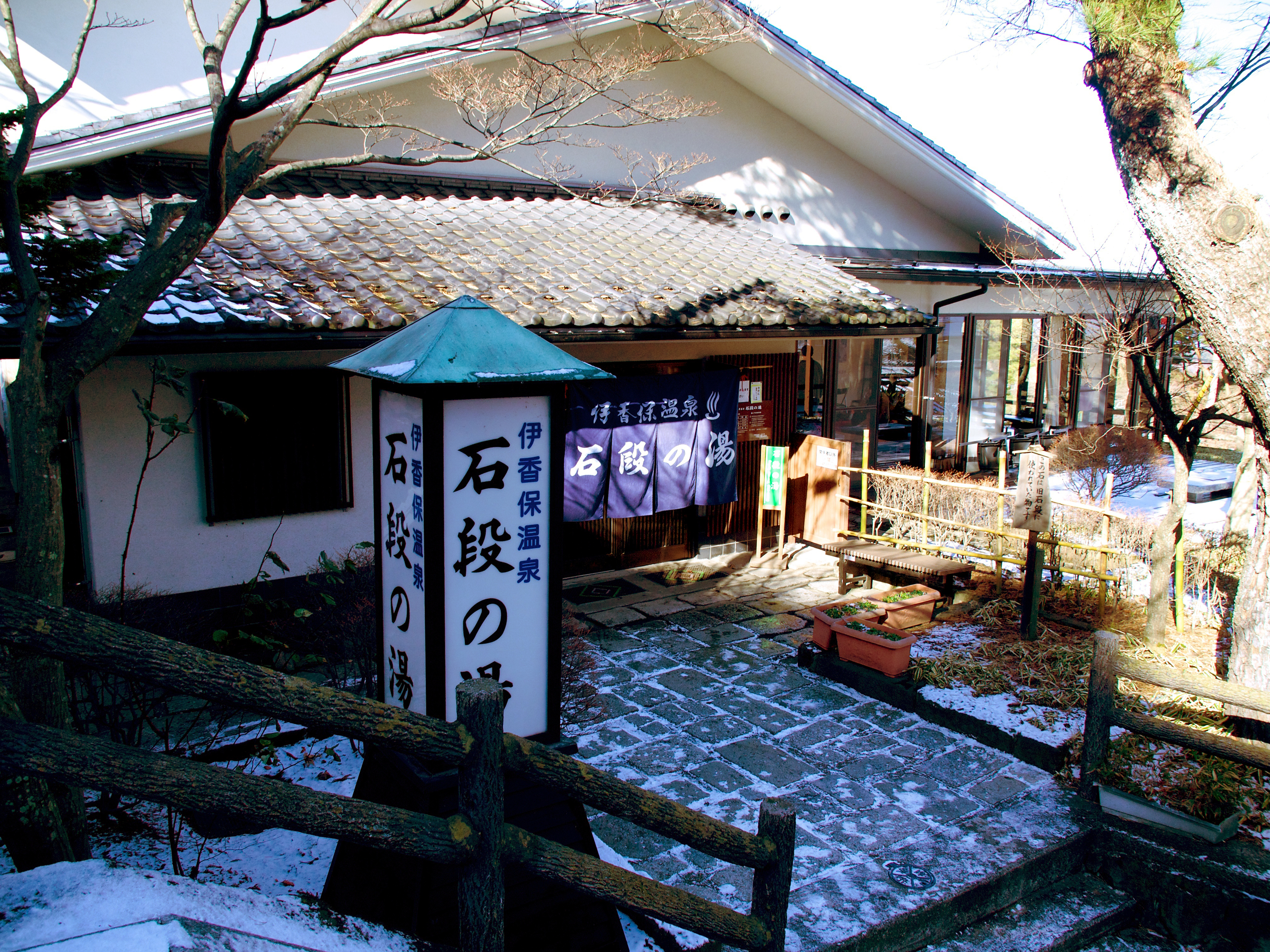
Ishidannoyu Onsen

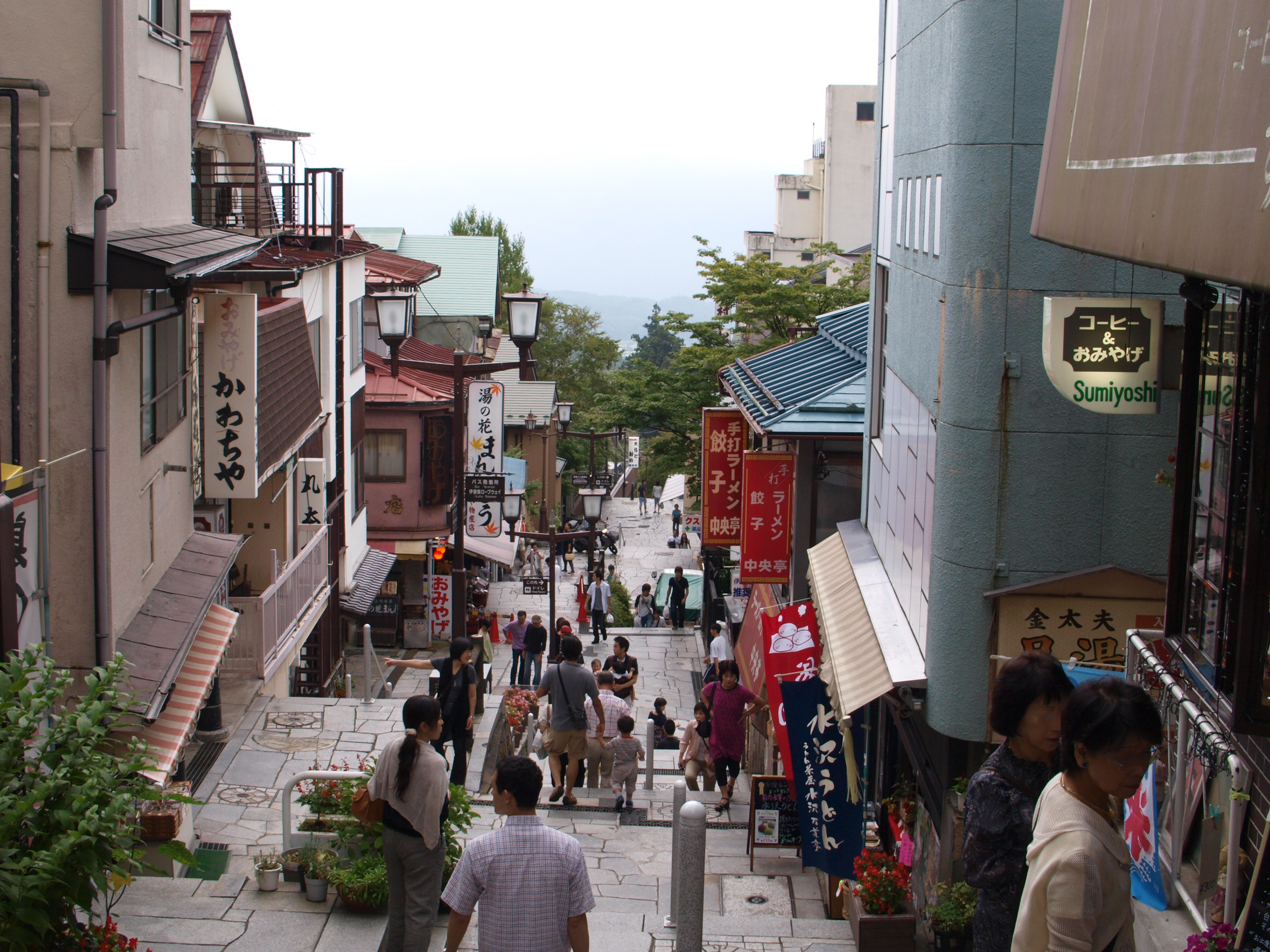
Ikaho Onsen

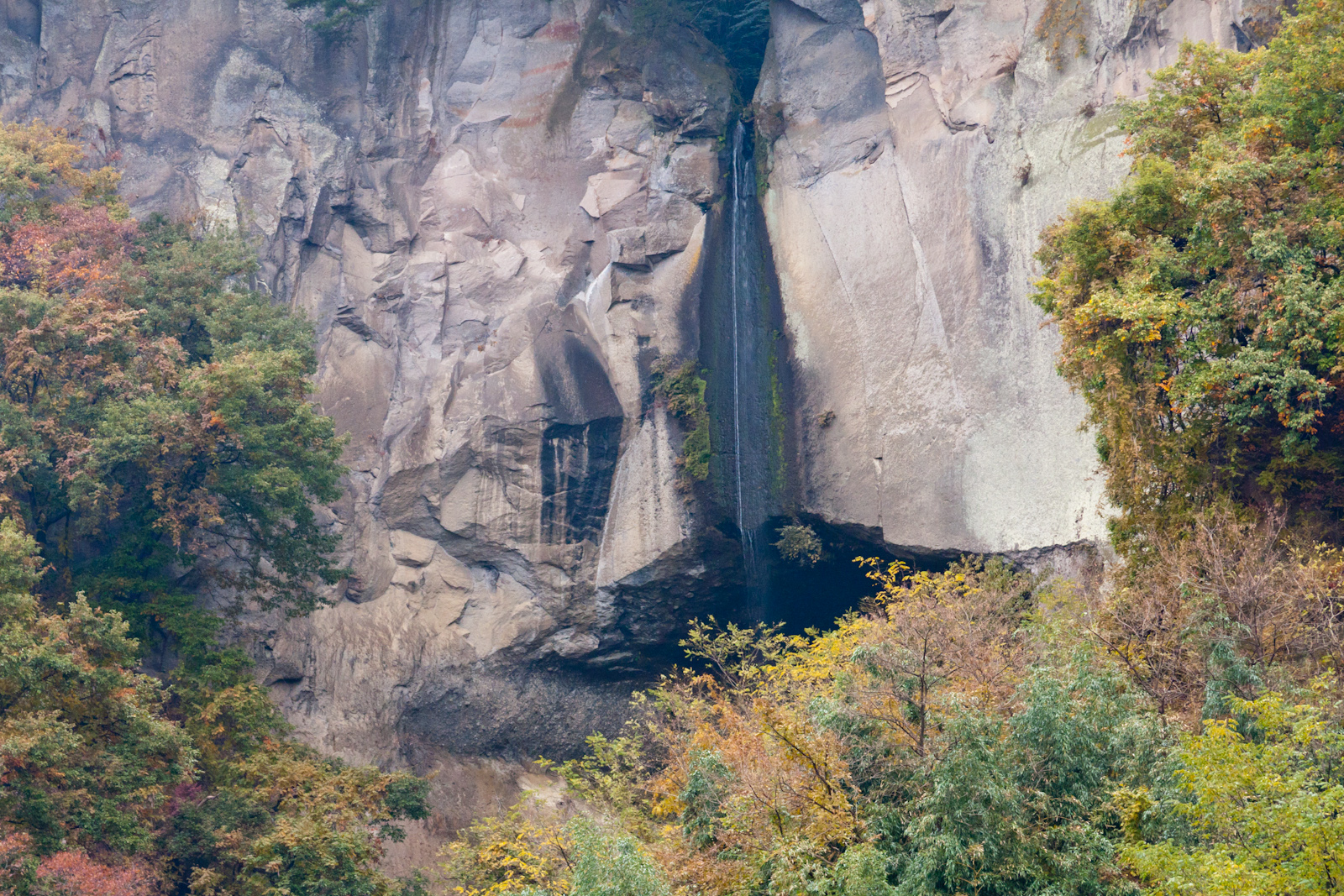
Tanashitafudō Waterfall

Shibukawa (渋川市, Shibukawa-shi) is a city in Gunma Prefecture, Japan. As of 31 August 2020, the city had an estimated population of 76,098 in 32,439 households, and a population density of 320 inhabitants per square kilometre (830/sq mi). The total area of the city is 240.27 square kilometres (92.77 sq mi). Shibukawa is the location of Ikaho Onsen, a popular hot spring resort.

== Geography ==
Shibukawa is located at the juncture of the Tone River and Agatsuma River, in the central part of Gunma Prefecture, on the northern edge of the Kantō plains. It is about 120 kilometres (75 miles) from Tokyo. To the west is Mount Haruna, and to the east is Mount Akagi. To the north are Mount Onoko and Mount Komochi. The Tone River flows from the north (between Mount Akagi and Mount Komochi) southward through the city, while the Agatsuma River flows from the west (between Mount Onoko and Mount Haruna), merging with the Tone River near the center of the city.

Shibukawa is at a central point (36°29′ N, 139°00′ E) of the Japanese archipelago and is thus known as the Bellybutton of Japan (日本のおへそ, nihon no oheso).

Shibukawa's highest altitude is 1,565 m (5,135 ft) above sea level; its lowest point is 139 m (456 ft) above sea level. The majority of the city lies between 200 and 800 metres (656 and 2,625 feet) above sea level

Farmland covers 49.88 km^{2} (19.26 sq mi) (20.8% of the city), housing covers 20.31 km^{2} (7.84 sq mi) (8.4%), and mountains and forests cover 77.39 km^{2} (29.88 sq mi) (32.2%) of the city’s area. The remaining 92.84 km^{2} (35.85 sq mi) (38.6%) has other land uses.

=== Surrounding municipalities ===
- To the north: Numata, Shōwa, Takayama
- To the east: Maebashi
- To the south: Maebashi, Shintō, Yoshioka
- To the west: Takasaki, Higashiagatsuma, Nakanojō

=== Climate ===
Shibukawa has a humid subtropical climate (Köppen Cfa) characterized by warm summers and cold winters with heavy snowfall. The average annual temperature in Shibukawa is 13.7 °C. The average annual rainfall is 1335 mm with September as the wettest month. The temperatures are highest on average in August, at around 26.1 °C, and lowest in January, at around 2.3 °C.

== Demographics ==
Per Japanese census data, the population of Shibukawa peaked around the year 1990 and has declined since.

Historical population
Year	Pop.	±%
1920	53,195	—
1930	59,999	+12.8%
1940	64,636	+7.7%
1950	82,971	+28.4%
1960	82,202	−0.9%
1970	83,756	+1.9%
1980	88,838	+6.1%
1990	91,094	+2.5%
2000	89,795	−1.4%
2010	83,330	−7.2%
2020	74,581	−10.5%

== History ==
Shibukawa is located within what was formerly Kōzuke Province. During the Edo period, the area of present-day Shibukawa prospered due to its location on the Mikuni Kaidō highway connecting Takasaki with Niigata. Post stations within the borders of modern Shibukawa were Shibukawa-shuku, Kanai-shuku, Kitamoku-shuku and Yokobori-shuku.

Shibukawa town was created in Nishigunma District, Gunma Prefecture on April 1, 1889, with the creation of the modern municipalities system after the Meiji Restoration. In 1896, Nishiguma District and Kataoka District merged to form Gunma District, Gunma; however, the area containing Shibukawa was separated out in October 1949 into Kitagunma District. On April 1, 1954, Shibukawa town absorbed the villages of Furumaki, Kanashima and Toyoaki to become the city of Shibukawa.

On February 20, 2006, Shibukawa absorbed the town of Ikaho, the villages of Komochi and Onogami (all from Kitagunma District), and the villages of Akagi and Kitatachibana (both from Seta District).

== Government ==
Shibukawa has a mayor-council form of government with a directly elected mayor and a unicameral city council of 18 members. Shibukawa contributes two members to the Gunma Prefectural Assembly. In terms of national politics, the city is divided between the Gunma 1st district and the Gunma 5th district of the lower house of the Diet of Japan.

== Economy ==
Shibukawa is a regional commercial center and transportation hub. Seasonal tourism, particularly to its hot spring and ski resorts, play a major role in the local economy.

The area is noted for its production of konjac.

== Education ==
Shibukawa has 14 public elementary schools and nine public middle schools operated by the city government, and four public high schools operated by the Gunma Prefectural Board of Education. The prefecture also operates two special education schools for the handicapped.

=== High schools ===
- Shibukawa High School
- Shibukawa Girls' High School
- Shibukawa Kougyou High School
- Shibukawa Seisui High School

=== Middle schools ===
- Akagi North Middle School
- Akagi South Middle School
- Furumaki Middle School
- Hokkitsu Middle School
- Ikaho Middle School
- Kanashima Middle School
- Komochi Middle School
- Shibukawa Middle School
- Shibukawa North Middle School

=== Elementary schools ===
- Ikaho Elementary School
- Furumaki Elementary School
- Kanashima Elementary School
- Miharada Elementary School
- Nagaou Elementary School
- Nakagou Elementary School
- Onogami Elementary School
- Shibukawa North Elementary School
- Shibukawa South Elementary School
- Shibukawa West Elementary School
- Tachibana North Elementary School
- Tachibana South Elementary School
- Toyoaki Elementary School
- Tsukuda Elementary School

== Transportation ==
=== Railway ===
JR East – Jōetsu Line

- Yagihara - Shibukawa - Shikishima - Tsukuda

JR East – Agatsuma Line

- Shibukawa - Kanashima - Ubashima - Onogami – Onogami-Onsen

Ikaho Ropeway

- Hototogisu Station and Miharashi Station

=== Highway ===
- Kan-etsu Expressway – Shibukawa-Ikaho IC, Akagi IC
- National Route 17
- National Route 353

== Local attractions ==
- Ikaho Onsen
- Takehisa Yumeji Memorial Museum
- Tokutomi Roka Memorial Museum
- Mizusawa-dera, 16th stop on the Bandō Sanjūsankasho pilgrimage
- Shibukawa Skyland Park – an amusement park
- Ikaho Green Bokujou – a farm designed to show its visitors about farming
- Ikaho Sistina Museum – an op art museum which also has a Sistine Chapel replica
- Japan Chanson Museum – a museum dedicated to the chanson style of music
- Shibukawa Sōgō Park – a large park encompassing hiking trails, campsites, tennis courts, a baseball diamond, a running track, and other recreational facilities
- Onoike Ajisai Park – a hydrangea park with a pond and hiking trails
- Shibukawa Sky Terume – a hot spring in a building which looks something like a spaceship
- Shibukawa is also recognized as a real-world setting for the street racing manga and anime series Initial D. The story takes place on the nearby Mount Haruna (fictionalized as Mount Akina), and the area is home to several of the series’ famous touge (mountain pass) routes. Visitors can find Initial D-themed manhole covers throughout the city. Key landmarks include the Project D Garage and the Ikaho Toy, Doll & Car Museum, which features the storefront used as Fujiwara Tofu Shop in the live-action film.

=== Festivals ===
Shibukawa calls itself the "Bellybutton of Japan" (日本のおへそ) and hosts the Bellybutton Festival (へそ祭り) every year in late July. The festival is based on a traditional Japanese form of entertainment where revelers paint a face on their torsos and stomachs and pretend it is a head. A kimono is then wrapped around the waist and the person's real head is hidden by a large cloth hat. The belly button is traditionally painted into a mouth. These days, modern motifs and anime designs have crept into the festival, which city officials said is all about having fun.

== Sister cities ==
Shibukawa is twinned with:

- Abano Terme, Veneto, Italy, since March 23, 1993
- Whakatāne, New Zealand, since 1992
- Logan City, Queensland, Australia, friendship city since April 17, 1996
- Hawaii County, Hawaii, United States, since January 22, 1997
- Foligno, Umbria, Italy, since March 23, 2000

== Noted people from Shibukawa ==
- Takahiro Fujioka, baseball player
- Takumi Fujiwara, main protagonist of the manga series Initial D
- Keisuke Kanoh, baseball player
- Toru Minegishi, video game composer
- Chocoball Mukai, actor
- Jiro Sato, tennis player
- Chūsei Sone, movie director
- Kiyohiko Shibukawa, fashion model and actor
