= Kurohone, Gunma =

Former village in Gunma prefecture, Japan

Kurohone (黒保根村, Kurohone-mura) was a village located in Seta District, Gunma Prefecture, Japan, on the southeast slope of Mount Akagi. The village split the highest peak of the mountain with Fujimi.

On June 13, 2005, Kurohone, along with the village of Niisato (also from Seta District), was merged into the expanded city of Kiryū.

The most notable attraction is the Mizunuma Onsen Center (水沼温泉センター), located within Mizunuma Station (水沼駅).
