= Ikaho Ropeway =

Aerial lift line in Shibukawa, Gunma, Japan

Coordinates: 36°29′5.17″N 138°55′09.71″E

Ikaho Ropeway 伊香保ロープウェイ
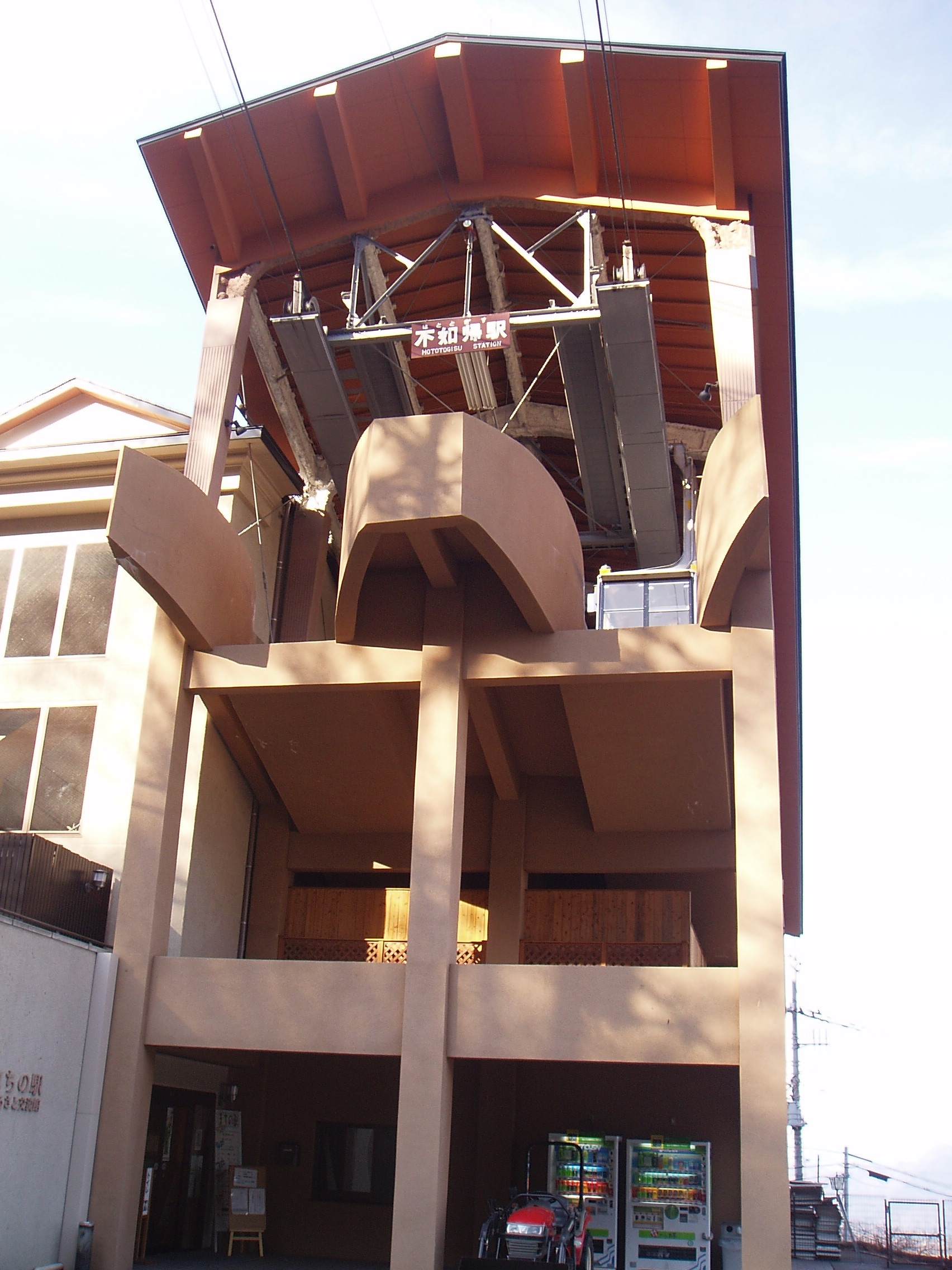
- Hototogisu Station (base station)

Overview
- Status: Operational
- Character: Elevated
- Location: Shibukawa, Gunma Prefecture, Japan
- Termini: Ikahomachi, Shibukawa; Summit of Mount Monokiki, Shibukawa
- No. of stations: 2

Operation
- Owner: City of Shibukawa, Gunma Prefecture, Japan
- Operator: City of Shibukawa

Technical features
- Aerial lift type: Aerial tramway
- Line length: 0.499 km (0.310 mi)
- Notes: 182 m (597 ft); Electric motor

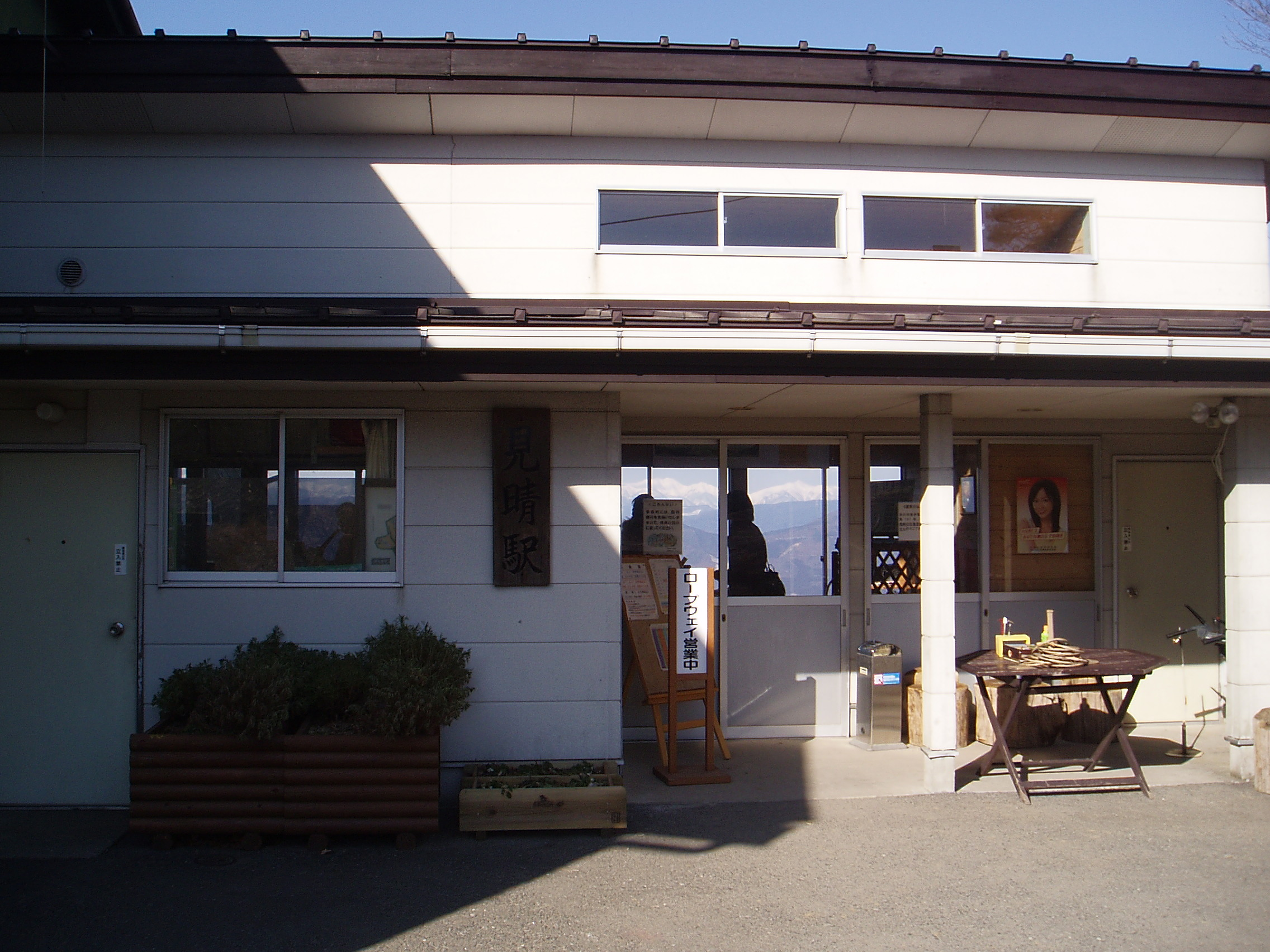
Miharashi Station (summit)

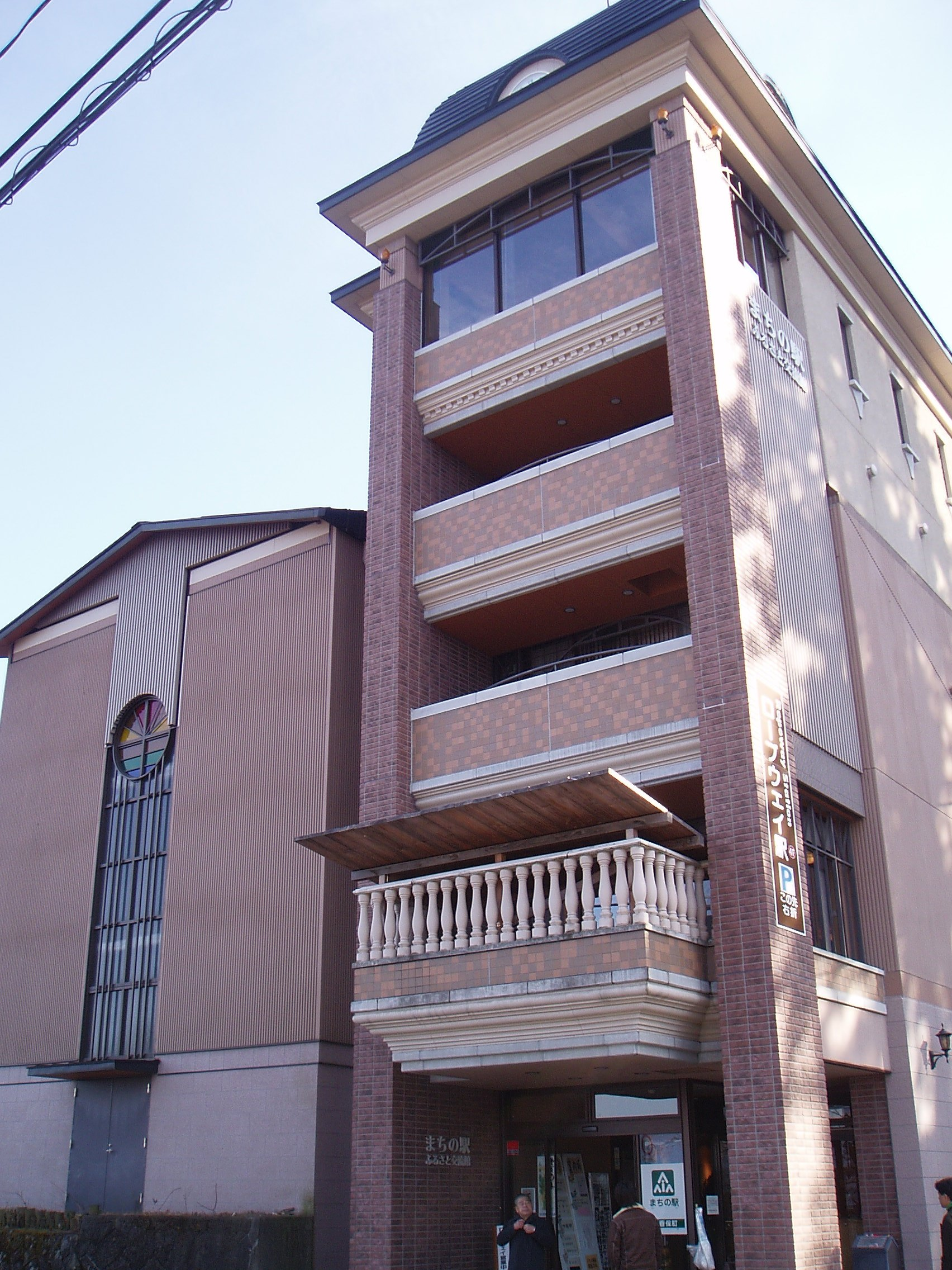
Michi no Eki Furusato Kōtsūkan visitor center adjacent to Hototogisu Station

The Ikaho Ropeway (伊香保ロープウェイ, Ikaho Rōpuwei) is a Japanese aerial lift line in Shibukawa, Gunma. The ropeway connects the onsen group of the Shibukawa Ikahomachi district to the summit of Mount Monokiki and the park facilities of Mount Kaminoyama.

== Description ==
The Ikaho Ropeway is owned and operated by City of Shibukawa. The ropeway operates between 8:40 am and 5:15 pm, and runs every day of the year, with the exception of maintenance and inspection days.

== Basic data ==
- System: Aerial tramway, 3 cables
- Cable length: 499 m (1,637 ft)
- Vertical interval: 182 m (597 ft)
- Passenger capacity per cabin: officially listed as 21 passengers, frequently listed as 20 passengers
- Stations: 2
- Frequency: Every ten minutes (8:40 am - 10 am), every 15 minutes (10 am - 5:15 pm)
- Final ascent: 5 pm, final descent: 5:15 pm
- Time required for single ride: 4 minutes
- Address (base station): 588-2 Ikahochō, Shibukawa City, Gunma Prefecture 〒377-0102

== Stations ==
=== Base station ===
- Hototogisu Station (不如帰駅, Hototogisu-eki). Base station. The first floor of the station serves a tourism information center, and the ropeway begins on the fourth floor. A visitor center, Michi no Eki Furusato Kōtsūkan, is adjacent to Hototogisu Station and sells vegetables and locally made soba buckwheat noodles, a noted product of the Shibukawa area. The station is named after the lesser cuckoo, which appears frequently in classical Japanese poems, prose, and visual works, notably the Pillow Book (1102 AD) of Sei Shonagon.

=== Summit station ===
- Miharashi Station (見晴駅, Miharashi-eki). Summit station. Miharashi Station is at the summit of Mount Monokiki, (900 meters (3,000 ft)), 182 m (597 ft) above sea level. The station allows access to skating center, Mount Kaminoyama, Mount Kaminoyama Park. The Mihara Observation Deck (見晴展望台, Mihara Tenbō-dai) at Kaminoyama Park provides broad views of nearby mountains and the Kantō Plain.

== See also ==
- List of aerial lifts in Japan
