= Keisuke Kanoh =

Japanese baseball player (born 1982)

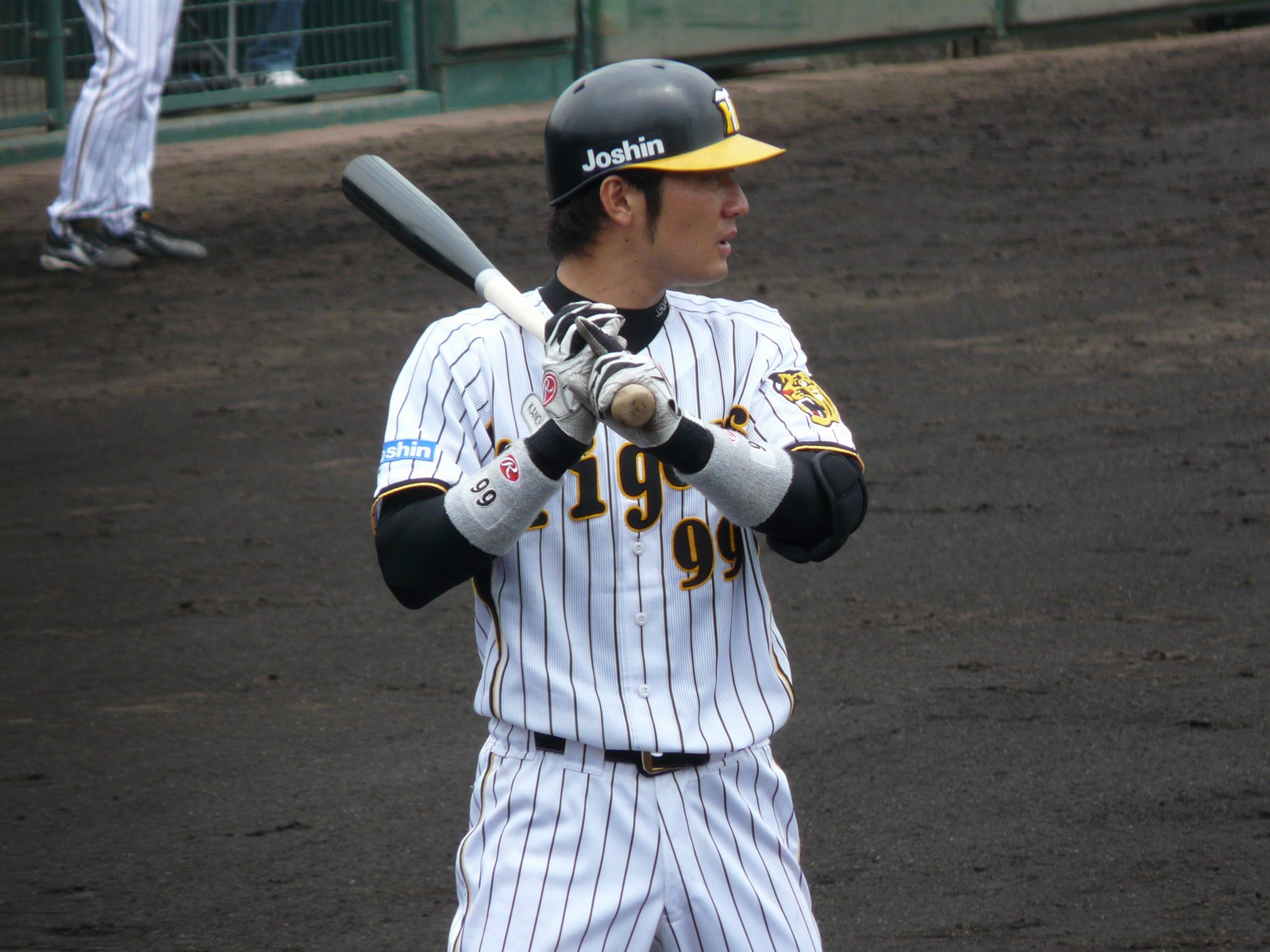
- Kanoh with the Hanshin Tigers
- Outfielder
- Born: December 17, 1982 (age 42); Shibukawa, Gunma, Japan
- Batted: Right Threw: Right

NPB debut
- September 22, 2004, for the Hanshin Tigers

Last NPB appearance
- September 3, 2017, for the Hanshin Tigers

NPB statistics
- Batting average: .255
- Home runs: 18
- Runs batted in: 91

Teams
- Hanshin Tigers (2004–2017)

Keisuke Kanoh (狩野 恵輔, Kanoh Keisuke; born December 17, 1982) is a Japanese former professional baseball outfielder. He played in Nippon Professional Baseball (NPB) for the Hanshin Tigers from 2004 to 2017.

== Early baseball career ==
Keisuke was born in Shibukawa, Gunma, Japan, and originally played as pitcher in junior high, but upon his election as team captain, he also became the team's catcher. During his 3rd year in Maebashi Kogyo High School, his team competed with Kiryuu Daiichi High in the Gunma prefectural tournament, wherein despite cracking a 4-run homer from Yasuhiro Ichiba (now with the Swallows), they were defeated. Despite this, he was the Hanshin Tiger's 3rd pick in the 2000 draft.

Due to his mature appearance in high school, he was dubbed as "Kakefu of Joshu" (Joshu no Kakefu or 上州の掛布), in reference to former Tigers player Masayuki Kakefu.
