= Onogami, Gunma =

Dissolved municipality in Gunma prefecture, Japan

Onogami (小野上村, Onogami-mura) was a village located in Kitagunma District, Gunma Prefecture, Japan.

== Population ==
As of 2003, the village had an estimated population of 2,067 and a density of 72.88 persons per km^{2}. The total area was 28.36 km^{2}.

== Merge ==
On February 20, 2006, Onogami, along with the town of Ikaho, the village of Komochi (all from Kitagunma District), and the villages of Akagi and Kitatachibana (both from Seta District), was merged into the expanded city of Shibukawa.
