= Nishigunma District, Gunma =

Former district in Gunma prefecture, Japan

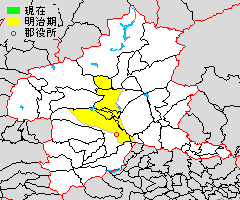
Location of Nishigunma within Gunma Prefecture

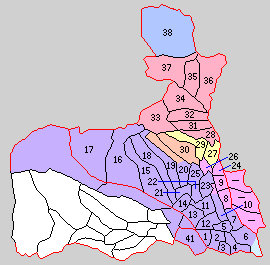
Historic Map of Gunma District areas 1 through 38 were formerly Nishigunma District: 1. Takasaki, 2. Sano, 3. Kuragano, 4. Iwahana, 5. Ōrui, 6. Takigawa, 7. Kyogashima, 8. Azuma, 9. Motosōja, 10. Shintakao, 11. Nakagawa, 12. Tsukasawa, 13. Rokurō, 14. Nagano, 15. Kuruma, 16. Muroda, 17. Kurata, 18. Kurumsato, 19. Minowa, 20. Sōma, 21. Kamisato, 22. Tsutsumigaoka, 23. Kokufu, 24. Sōja, 25. Kaneko, 26. Kiyosato, 27. Komayose, 28. Furumaki, 29. Meiji, 30. Momoi, 31. Toyoaki, 32. Shibukawa, 33. Ikaho, 34. Kaneshima, 35. Nakao, 36. Shiorsatoi, 37. Onogami, 38. Takayama

Nishigunma District (西群馬郡, Nishigunma-gun) was formerly a rural district located in Gunma Prefecture, Japan. Parts of the cities of Takasaki, Maebashi, Shibukawa, the town of Yoshioka and the villages of Shintō and Takayama were formerly part of the district.

Nishigunma District was created on December 7, 1878, with the reorganization of Gunma Prefecture into districts. With the establishment of the municipalities system on April 1, 1889, the area was organized into six towns (Takasaki, Kuragano, Sōja, Kaneko, Shibukawa and Ikaho) and 32 villages.

On April 1, 1896, Takayama village was transferred to Azuma District and the remaining area of the district was merged with Kataoka District into Gunma District.

== Nishigunma County Office ==
Located at 47 Renjaku-cho, Takasaki. In 1881, it merged with the Kataoka District Office to become the Nishigunma Kataoka District Office. It was destroyed by fire in 1895.
