= Komochi, Gunma =

Dissolved municipality in Gunma prefecture, Japan

Komochi (子持村, Komochi-mura) was a village located in Kitagunma District, Gunma Prefecture, Japan.

As of 2003, the village had an estimated population of 11,937 and a density of 291.36 persons per km^{2}. The total area was 40.97 km^{2}.

On February 20, 2006, Komochi, along with the town of Ikaho, the village of Onogami (all from Kitagunma District), and the villages of Akagi and Kitatachibana (both from Seta District), was merged into the expanded city of Shibukawa.
