= Fujimi, Gunma =

Dissolved municipality in Gunma prefecture, Japan

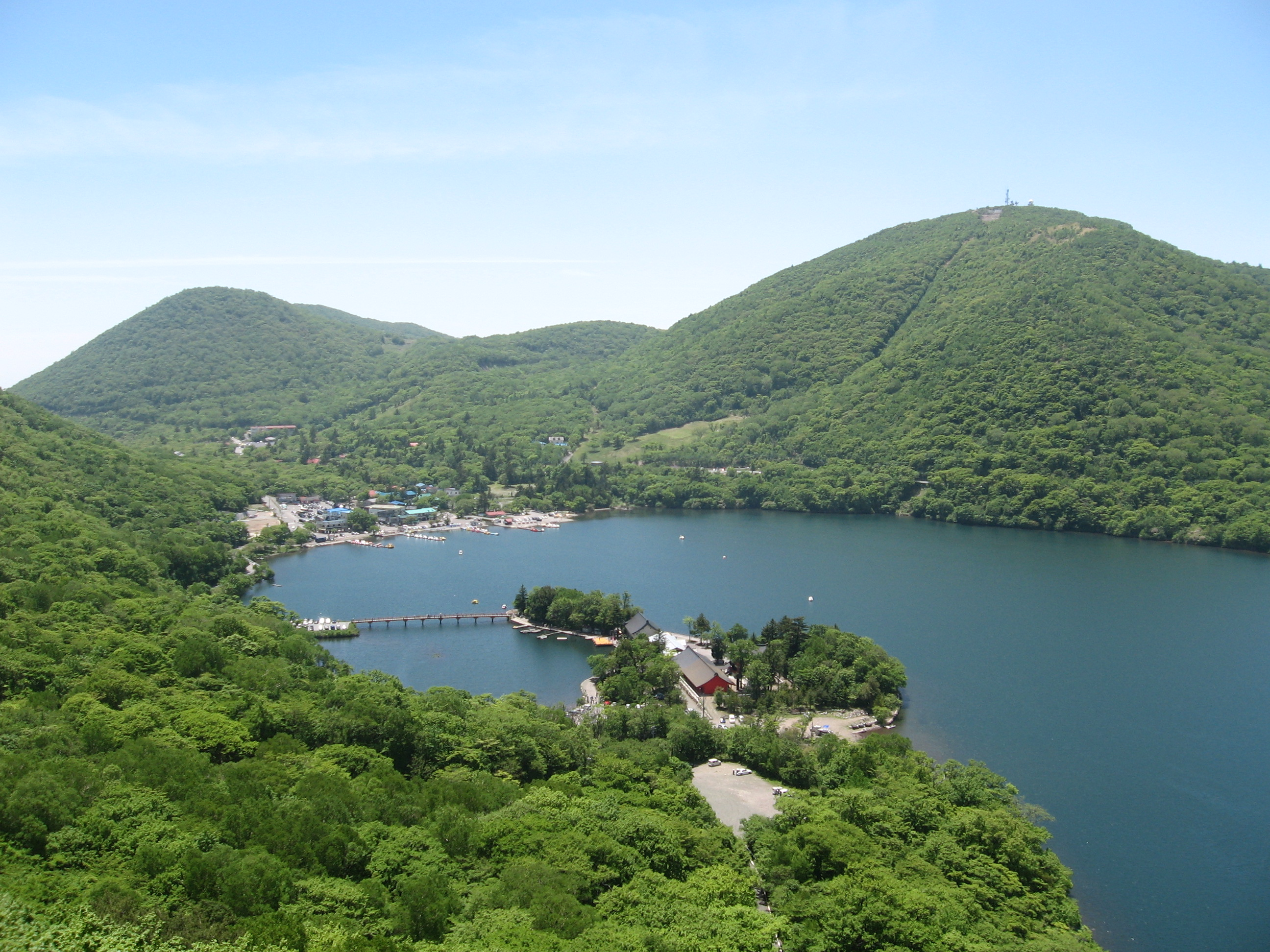
Lake Ono and Akagi shrine in Mount Akagi

Fujimi (富士見村, Fujimi-mura) was a village located in Seta District, Gunma Prefecture, Japan.

As of September 1, 2007, the village had an estimated population of 22,267 and a population density of 316.20 persons per km^{2}. The total area was 70.42 km^{2}.

== History ==
On May 5, 2009, Fujimi was merged into the expanded city of Maebashi. Seta District also ceased to exist as a result.

== Geography ==
Located in the northwestern portion of the Kantō Plain, the village stretched from the summit of Mount Akagi to the bottom. At the summit of Mount Akagi, there are two lakes, Ōnuma and Konuma, caldera lakes. Alpine plants such as Asian skunk cabbages grow in the marshland. The northern portion of the village was mainly covered by forests without many human dwellings, while the southern portion was flat with farmland.

== Surrounding municipalities ==
- Maebashi
- Kiryū
- Numata
- Shibukawa

(all in Gunma Prefecture)

== Education ==
=== Primary schools ===
- Hara Elementary School
- Ishii Elementary School
- Shirakawa Elementary School
- Tokizawa Elementary School

=== Junior high schools ===
- Fujimi Junior High School
