= Seta District, Gunma =

Former district in Gunma prefecture, Japan

Coordinates: 36.3892°N 139.0640°E

Seta (勢多郡, Seta-gun) was a district located in northeastern Gunma Prefecture (Kozuke Province), Japan. Before the day of dissolution on May 4, 2009, the district contained one village, Fujimi (富士見村). Before Meiji, the district covered the entire foothills of Mount Akagi.

== History ==
After entering the Meiji Era, the former shōgun owned lands became Iwahana Prefecture and the former Maebashi Domain lands became Maebashi Prefecture. After the Abolition of the han system in 1871, the entire area became Gunma Prefecture, but due to the changes to the prefecture, the area became Kumagaya Prefecture in 1873 and to Gunma Prefecture in 1876.

Due to the land reforms of 1878, the district was split into two with the Mount Akagi is being the borderline, the northern foothills of Mount Akagi became Kitaseta District while the southern foothills became Minamiseta District. Since the area of Kitaseta District was too small, the district merged into Tone District in 1896. At the same time, Minamiseta District merged with Higashigunma District to recreate Seta District.

== Timeline ==
=== Seta District(~1878) ===
- July 22, 1878 - Due to land reforms, Seta District split into Kitaseta and Minamiseta Districts.

=== Seta District(1896~2009) ===
- April 1, 1896 - The district was formed when Higashigunma and Minamiseta Districts merged. (17 villages)
- May 24, 1899 - The village of Ōgo was elevated to town status to become the town of Ōgo. (1 town, 16 villages)
- April 1, 1901 - Parts of the village of Kamikawabuchi was merged into the city of Maebashi.
- April 1, 1951 - Parts of Mitsumata, village of Kaigaya, was merged into the city of Maebashi.
- April 1, 1954 - The villages of Kamikawabuchi, Shimokawabuchi, Haga, and Kaigaya were merged into the city of Maebashi. (1 town, 12 villages)
- September 1, 1954 - The village of Nankitsu was merged into the city of Maebashi. (1 town, 11 villages)
- April 1, 1955 - Parts of the village of Kise was merged into the city of Maebashi.
- September 1, 1956 - The villages of Yokono and Shikishima were merged to create the village of Akagi. (1 town, 10 villages)
- February 20, 1957 - The villages of Kise and Arato were merged to create the village of Jōnan. (1 town, 9 villages)
- February 1, 1958 - Parts of the village of Kurohone was merged into the town of town of Ōmama (in Yamada District).
- April 1, 1960 - Parts of the village of Jōnan was merged into the city of Maebashi.
- May 1, 1967 - The village of Jōnan was merged into the city of Maebashi. (1 town, 8 villages)
- December 5, 2004 - The town of Ōgo, and the villages of Kasukawa and Miyagi were merged into the expanded city of Maebashi. (6 villages)
- June 13, 2005 - The villages of Kurohone and Niisato were merged into the city of Kiryū. (4 villages)
- February 20, 2006 - The villages of Akagi and Kitatachibana, the town of Ikaho, and the villages of Komochi and Onogami (both from Kitagunma District), were merged into the expanded city of Shibukawa. (2 villages)
- March 27, 2006 - The village of Azuma was merged with the town of Omama (from Yamada District), and the town of Kasakake (from Nitta District), to create the city of Midori. (1 village)
- May 5, 2009 - The village of Fujimi was merged into the expanded city of Maebashi. Seta District was dissolved as a result of this merger.

明治22年4月1日		明治22年 - 昭和25年	昭和26年 - 昭和30年	昭和31年 - 昭和63年		平成1年 - 現在	現在
旧東群馬郡	下川淵村	下川淵村	昭和29年4月1日 前橋市に編入	前橋市		前橋市	前橋市
旧東群馬郡	上川淵村	上川淵村	昭和29年4月1日 前橋市に編入	前橋市		前橋市	前橋市
旧東群馬郡	上川淵村	明治34年4月1日 前橋市に編入	前橋市	前橋市		前橋市	前橋市
旧東群馬郡	前橋町	明治25年4月1日 市制	前橋市	前橋市		前橋市	前橋市
旧南勢多郡	桂萱村	桂萱村	昭和26年4月1日 三俣の一部を前橋市に編入 昭和29年4月1日 前橋市に編入	前橋市		前橋市	前橋市
旧南勢多郡	芳賀村	芳賀村	昭和29年4月1日 前橋市に編入	前橋市		前橋市	前橋市
旧南勢多郡	南橘村	南橘村	昭和29年9月1日 前橋市に編入	前橋市		前橋市	前橋市
旧南勢多郡	木瀬村	木瀬村	昭和30年4月1日 前橋市に編入	前橋市		前橋市	前橋市
旧南勢多郡	木瀬村	木瀬村	木瀬村	昭和32年2月20日 城南村	昭和35年4月1日 一部を前橋市に編入 昭和42年5月1日 前橋市に編入	前橋市	前橋市
旧南勢多郡	荒砥村	荒砥村	荒砥村	昭和32年2月20日 城南村	昭和35年4月1日 一部を前橋市に編入 昭和42年5月1日 前橋市に編入	前橋市	前橋市
旧南勢多郡	大胡村	明治32年5月24日 町制	大胡町	大胡町		平成16年12月5日 前橋市に編入	前橋市
旧南勢多郡	粕川村	粕川村	粕川村	粕川村		平成16年12月5日 前橋市に編入	前橋市
旧南勢多郡	宮城村	宮城村	宮城村	宮城村		平成16年12月5日 前橋市に編入	前橋市
旧南勢多郡	富士見村	富士見村	富士見村	富士見村		平成21年5月5日 前橋市に編入	前橋市
旧南勢多郡	敷島村	敷島村	敷島村	昭和31年9月1日 赤城村		平成18年2月20日 渋川市の一部	渋川市
旧南勢多郡	横野村	横野村	横野村	昭和31年9月1日 赤城村		平成18年2月20日 渋川市の一部	渋川市
旧南勢多郡	北橘村	北橘村	北橘村	北橘村		平成18年2月20日 渋川市の一部	渋川市
旧南勢多郡	新里村	新里村	新里村	新里村		平成17年6月13日 桐生市に編入	桐生市
旧南勢多郡	黒保根村	黒保根村	黒保根村	黒保根村		平成17年6月13日 桐生市に編入	桐生市
旧南勢多郡	黒保根村	黒保根村	黒保根村	昭和33年2月1日 山田郡大間々町に編入		平成18年3月27日 みどり市の一部	みどり市
旧南勢多郡	東村	東村	東村	東村		平成18年3月27日 みどり市の一部	みどり市
