= Niisato, Gunma =

Dissolved municipality in Gunma prefecture, Japan

Niisato (新里村, Niisato-mura) was a village located in Seta District, Gunma Prefecture, Japan.

On June 13, 2005, Niisato, along with the village of Kurohone (also from Seta District), was merged into the expanded city of Kiryū.
