= Kitagunma District, Gunma =

District in Gunma prefecture, Japan

Coordinates: 36.4478°N 138.967°E

Location of Kitagunma District in Gunma Prefecture

Kitagunma District (北群馬郡, Kitagunma-gun) is a rural district located in Gunma Prefecture, Japan. As of January 2015, the district had an estimated population of 35,190 and an area of 48.38 km^{2}, with a population density of 727 people per square kilometer.

== Towns and villages ==
- Yoshioka
- Shintō

Much of the city of Shibukawa was formerly part of the district.

== History ==
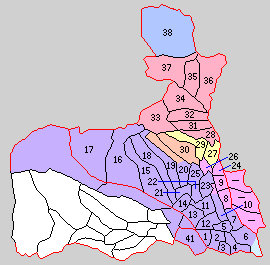
Historic Map of Gunma District: 27. Komayose, 28. Furumaki, 29. Meiji, 30. Momoi, 31. Toyoaki, 32. Shibukawa, 33. Ikaho, 34. Kaneshima, 35. Nagao, 36. Shirosatoi, 37.Onogami, 12.Tago, 13. Irino, 14. Hino, 21. Mihara, 22. Kamikawa, 23. Nakasato, 24. Ueno

- October 1, 1949 - The district was formed when the towns of Shibukawa, Ikaho, and the villages of Kanashima, Furumaki, Toyoaki, Komayose, Meiji, Momoi, Nagao, Shirosatoi and Onogami split off from Gunma District. (2 towns, 9 villages)
- April 1, 1954 - The town of Shibukawa and the villages of Kanashima, Furumaki, and Toyoaki merged to form the city of Shibukawa. (1 town, 6 villages)
- April 1, 1955 - The villages of Komayose and Meiji merged to form the village of Yoshioka. (1 town, 5 villages)
- March 30, 1957 - The village of Momoi and parts of the village of Souma from Gunma District merged to form the new town of Momoi.
- August 1, 1959 - The village of Momoi renamed to the village of Shintō.
- September 1, 1960 - The villages of Nagao and Shirosatoi merged to form the village of Komochi. (1 town, 4 villages)
- April 1, 1991 - The village of Yoshioka gained town status to become the town of Yoshioka. (2 towns, 3 villages)
- February 20, 2006 - The town of Ikaho and the villages of Komochi and Onogami merge with the city of Shibukawa and the villages of Akagi and Kitatachibana from Seta District to form the city of Shibukawa. (1 town, 1 village)
