= Gunma District, Gunma =

Former district in Gunma prefecture, Japan

Gunma (群馬郡, Gunma-gun) was a district located in Gunma Prefecture, Japan.

As of June 30, 2004, the district had an estimated population of 22,303. The total area was 93.59 km^{2}.

Until the day before the dissolution (September 30, 2006), the district had one town.

- Haruna

== History ==
In 1878, the district split off at the Tone River, forming Higashigunma and Nishigunma Districts. Since Higashigunma District areas was smaller, Higashigunma merged with Minamiseta District in 1896 to form Seta District. At the same time, Nishigunma merged with Kataoka District and renamed to Gunma District. In 1949, Kitagunma District was created out from Gunma District.

On October 1, 2006, the town of Haruna was merged into the expanded city of Takasaki. Therefore, Gunma District was dissolved as a result of this merger.

=== District Timeline ===
==== Gunma District ~1876 ====
- 1876 - The District broke off into Higashigunma District and Nishigunma District.

==== Gunma District 1896-2006 ====
- April 1, 1896 - Nishigunma District merged with Kataoka District to form Gunma District. (6 towns, 33 villages)
- April 1, 1900 - The town of Takasaki was elevated to city status. (5 towns, 33 villages)
- April 1, 1905 - The village of Murota was elevated to town status. (6 towns, 32 villages)
- April 1, 1921 - The village of Minowa was elevated to town status. (7 towns, 31 villages)
- April 1, 1927 - The villages of Tsukasawa and Kataoka was merged into the city of Takasaki. (7 towns, 29 villages)
- October 1, 1939 - The village of Sano merged into the city of Takasaki. (7 towns, 28 villages)
- October 1, 1949 - 2 towns and 9 villages were split from the district to form Kitagunma District. (5 towns, 19 villages)
- April 1, 1951 - The village of Rokugo was merged into the city of Takasaki. (5 towns, 18 villages)
- April 1, 1954 - The town of Soja and the villages of Azuma and Motosoja were merged into the city of Maebashi. (4 towns, 16 villages)
- January 20, 1955 (4 towns, 13 villages)
  - The village of Kiyosato and parts of the village of Shintakao (the locality of Toba) were merged into the city of Maebashi.
  - The village of Nakagawa and the remaining parts of the village of Shintakao were merged into the city of Takasaki.
- February 1, 1955 (4 towns, 13 villages)
  - The town of Murota was merged with the village of Satomi from Usui District to create the town of Haruna.
  - The village of Kurata was merged with the village of Ubuchi from Usui District to create the town of Kurabuchi.
- March 1, 1955 - The village of Kuruma was merged into the town of Haruna. (4 towns, 12 villages)
- April 1, 1955 (4 towns, 9 villages)
  - The town of Minowa and the village of Kurumasato were merged to form the town of Misato.
  - The towns of Tsutsumigaoka and Kaneko, and the village of Kokufu were merged to form the town of Gunma.
- August 1, 1955 - The village of Nagano was merged into the city of Takasaki. (4 towns, 8 villages)
- September 30, 1956 (4 towns, 6 villages)
  - The village of Orui wasmerged into the city of Takaoka.
  - The villages of Takigawa and Kyogashima were merged to form the village of Gunnan.
- March 30, 1957 - Parts of the village of Souma was merged with the village of Momoi (from Kitagunma District) to create the village of Momoi (in Kitagunma District). The remaining parts of the village was merged into the village of Minowa. (4 towns, 5 villages)
- April 1, 1957 - The village of Kamisato had split and was merged each into the towns of Minowa and Gunma (respectively). (4 towns, 3 villages)
- August 1, 1957 (4 towns, 2 villages)
  - Part of the village of Gunnan was merged with the town of Tamamura and the village of Joyo (from Sawa District) to create the town of Tamamura (in Sawa District).
  - The villages of Iwahana had split and was merged each into the village of Gunnan and the city of Takasaki (respectively).
- October 15, 1957 - Parts of the village of Gunnan (the locality of Sakai) was merged into the town of Tamamura (in Sawa District).
- March 31, 1963 - The town of Kuragano was merged into the city of Takasaki (3 towns, 2 villages)
- September 1, 1965 - The village of Gunnan was merged into the city of Takasaki. (3 towns, 1 village)
- July 1, 1996 - The village of Kurabuchi renames (倉淵村->倉渕村)
- January 23, 2006 - The towns of Gunma, Kurabuchi, and Misato were merged into the expanded city of Takasaki. (1 town)
- October 1, 2006 - The town of Haruna was merged into the expanded city of Takasaki. Gunma District was dissolved as a result of this merger.
