= Kataoka District, Gunma =

Former district in Gunma prefecture, Japan

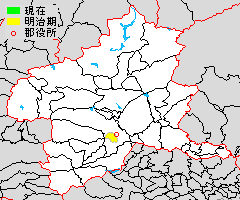
Location of Kataoka District within Gunma Prefecture

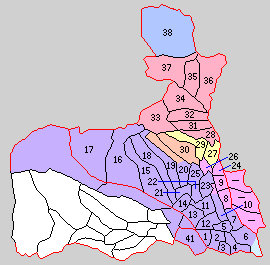
Historic Map of Gunma District: 41. Kataoka, areas 1 through 38 were formerly Nishigunma District

Kataoka District (片岡郡, Kataoka-gun) was formerly a rural district located in Gunma Prefecture, Japan. The district is now entirely part of the city of Takasaki.

Kataoka District was created on December 7, 1878, with the reorganization of Gunma Prefecture into districts. It included 3 villages, which were formerly part of the holdings of Takasaki Domain in Kōzuke Province under the Tokugawa shogunate. With the establishment of the municipalities system on April 1, 1889, the area was organized as a single village (Kataoka).

On April 1, 1896, the district was merged with Nishigunma District into Gunma District.
