= Mount Akagi =

Mountain in Japan

- 赤城山
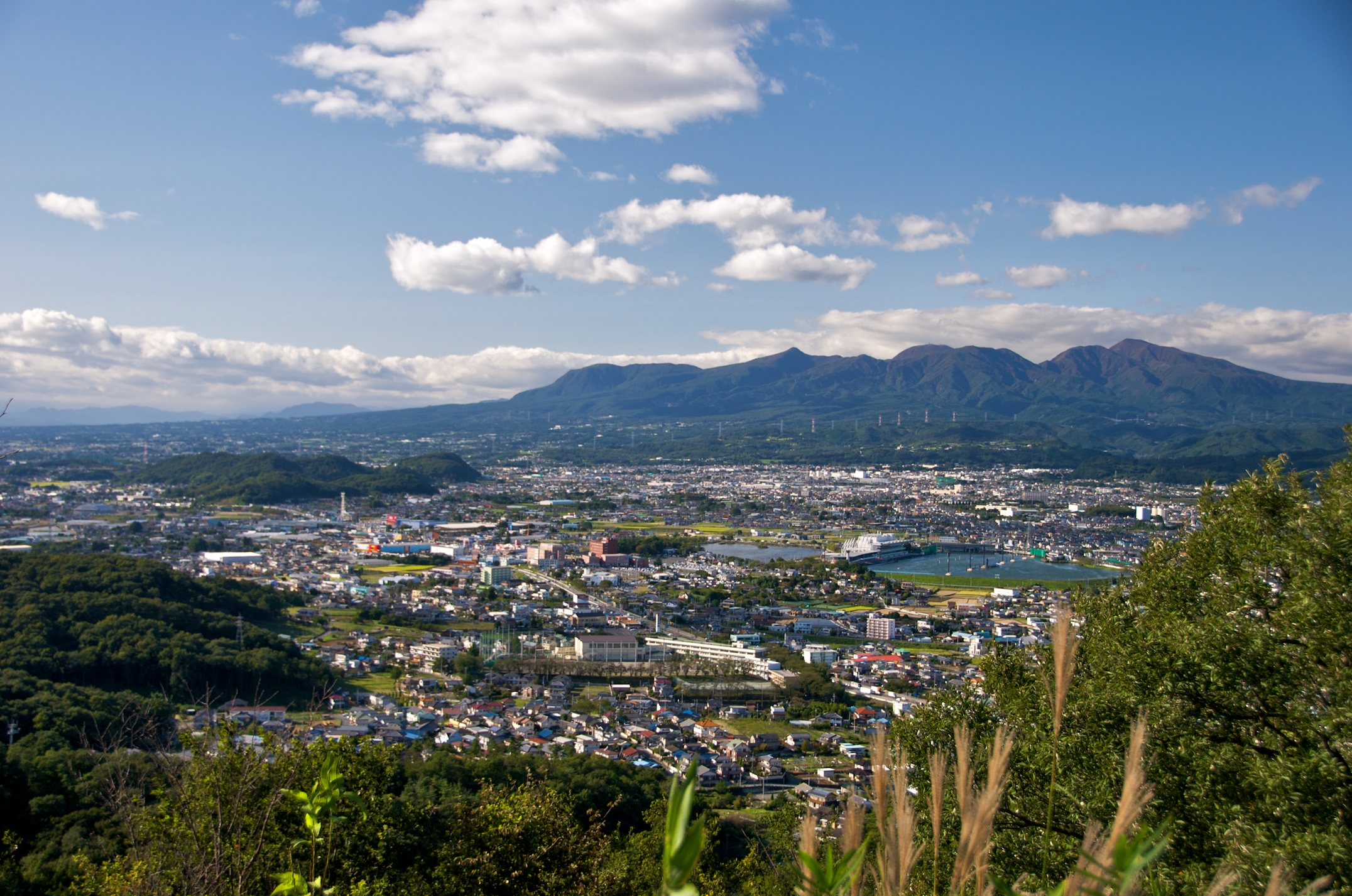
- Viewed from the southeast. In the foreground are parts of the cities of Kiryu and Midori.

Highest point
- Elevation: 1,828 m (5,997 ft)
- Listing: Volcanoes of Japan; Mountains of Japan
- Coordinates: 36°33′26″N 139°11′47″E

Naming
- English translation: Red Castle Mountain
- Language of name: Japanese

Geography
- Location within Japan
- Country: Japan
- Prefecture: Gunma

Geology
- Mountain type: Stratovolcano
- Volcanic arc: Northeastern Japan Arc
- Last eruption: Possibly 1251

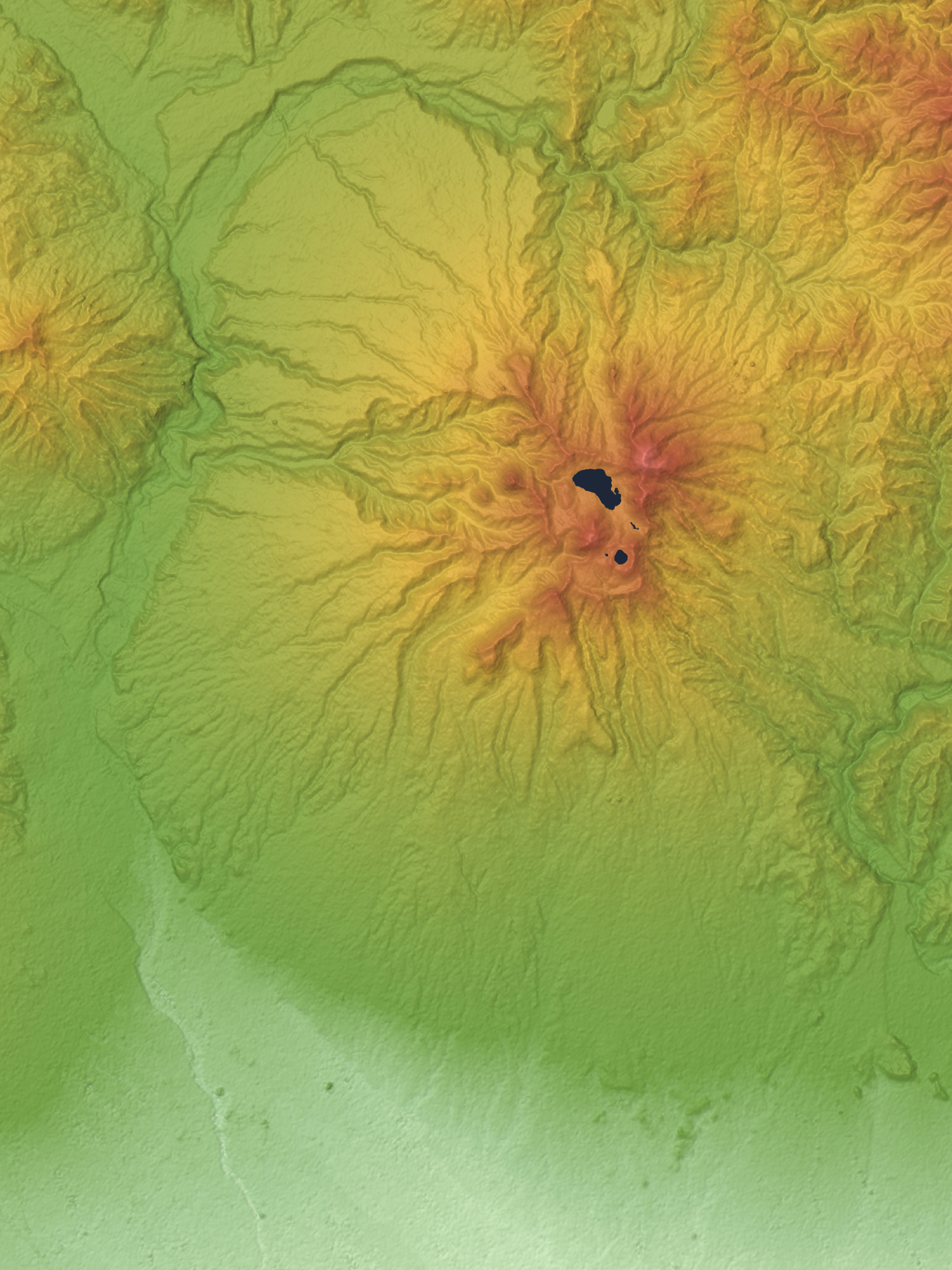
Relief Map of Akagi Volcano

Mount Akagi (赤城山, Akagi-yama; Red Castle) is a stratovolcano in Gunma Prefecture, Japan.

The broad, low dominantly andesitic stratovolcano rises above the northern end of the Kanto Plain. It contains an elliptical, 3 km × 4 km (1.9 mi × 2.5 mi) summit caldera with post-caldera lava domes arranged along a NW–SE line. Lake Ono is located at the NE end of the caldera. An older stratovolcano was partially destroyed by edifice collapse, producing a debris-avalanche deposit along the south flank. A series of large plinian eruptions accompanied growth of a second stratovolcano during the Pleistocene. Construction of the central cone in the late-Pleistocene summit caldera began following the last of the plinian eruptions about 31,000 years ago. During historical time unusual activity was recorded on several occasions during the 9th century, but reported eruptions in 1251 and 1938 are considered uncertain.

Mount Akagi, along with Mount Myōgi and Mount Haruna, is one of the "Three Mountains of Jōmō" (上毛三山), and the cold north winds which blow down from it are called Akagi-oroshi (赤城おろし) or Karakkaze (空っ風).

The Amagi-class battlecruiser Akagi, converted into an aircraft carrier during construction, was named after Mount Akagi and was the flagship for the strike force commanded by Vice Admiral Chuichi Nagumo in the attack on Pearl Harbor. The carrier was later sunk in the Battle of Midway.

== Religion ==
Mount Akagi is an object of worship in this region. On Ōno Lake, there is Akagi Shrine.

== Access ==
The upper portions of the prefectural road Route 4 approach the top of Mount Akagi. Kanetsu Kotsu Bus comes to Akagi Visitor Center from Maebashi Station or Fujimi Onsen Bus Stop.

== Climbing routes ==
To the top of Mount Kurobi, the highest point of this mountain, it takes about three hours from the Akagi Hiroba Bus Stop.

== In popular culture ==
The sixth Zatoichi film, Zatoichi and the Chest of Gold, this mountain is the destination of Ichi as he searches for the brigand Chuji.

Mount Akagi is mentioned in the street racing manga and anime series Initial D. The portions of Gunma Route 4 [GPS Coordinates 36°32'31.6"N 139°09'59.5"E] on Mount Akagi are featured in numerous Initial D episodes. It is the home course of the racing team called the Akagi RedSuns.

Mount Akagi is also featured in the street racing game Tokyo Xtreme Racer: Drift 2 and the arcade/simulator game Auto Modellista.

According to unofficial sources, Mt. Moon from the Pokémon franchise is based on Mount Akagi.

== Gallery ==
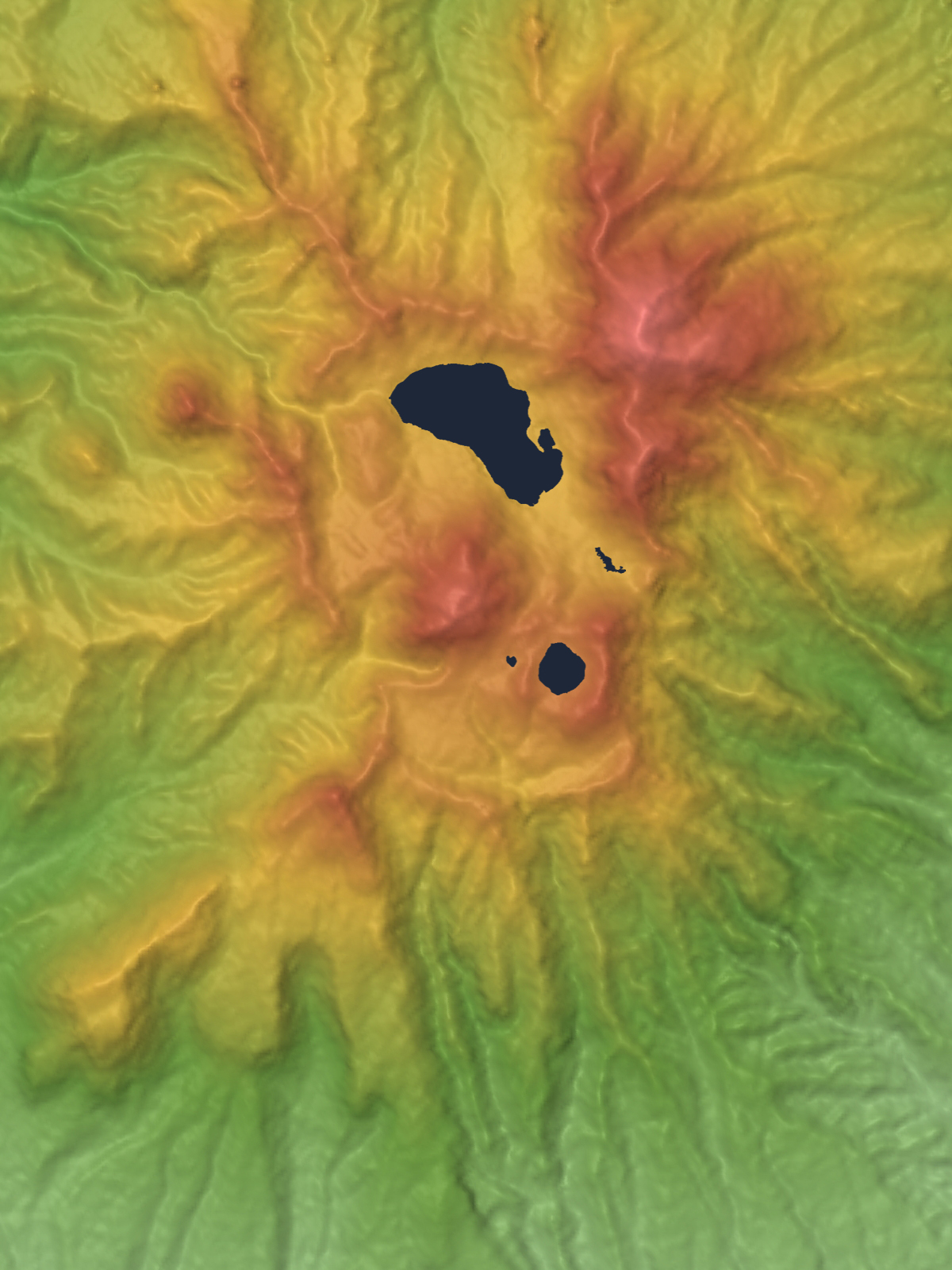
Mountaintop Area

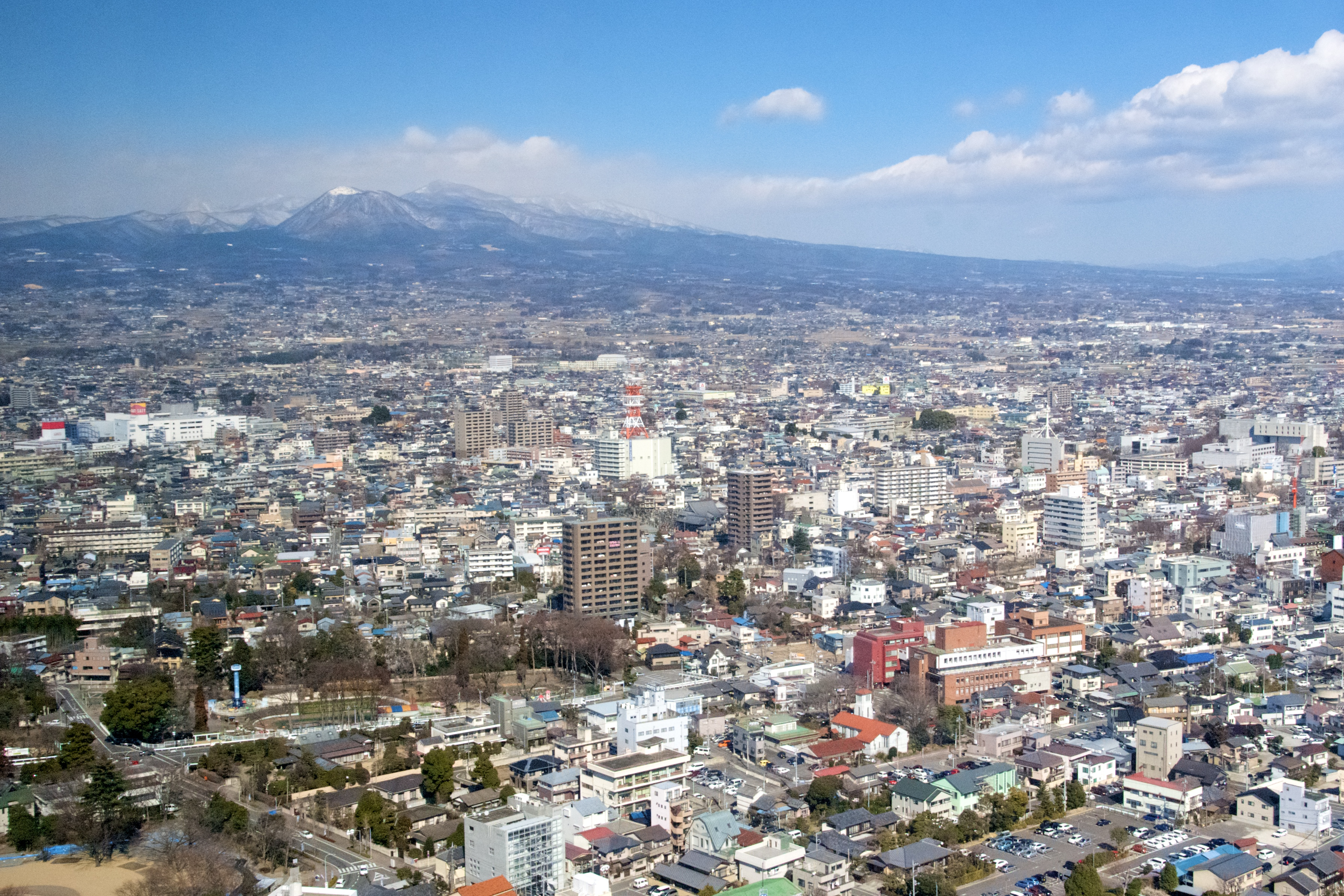
View from Maebashi city

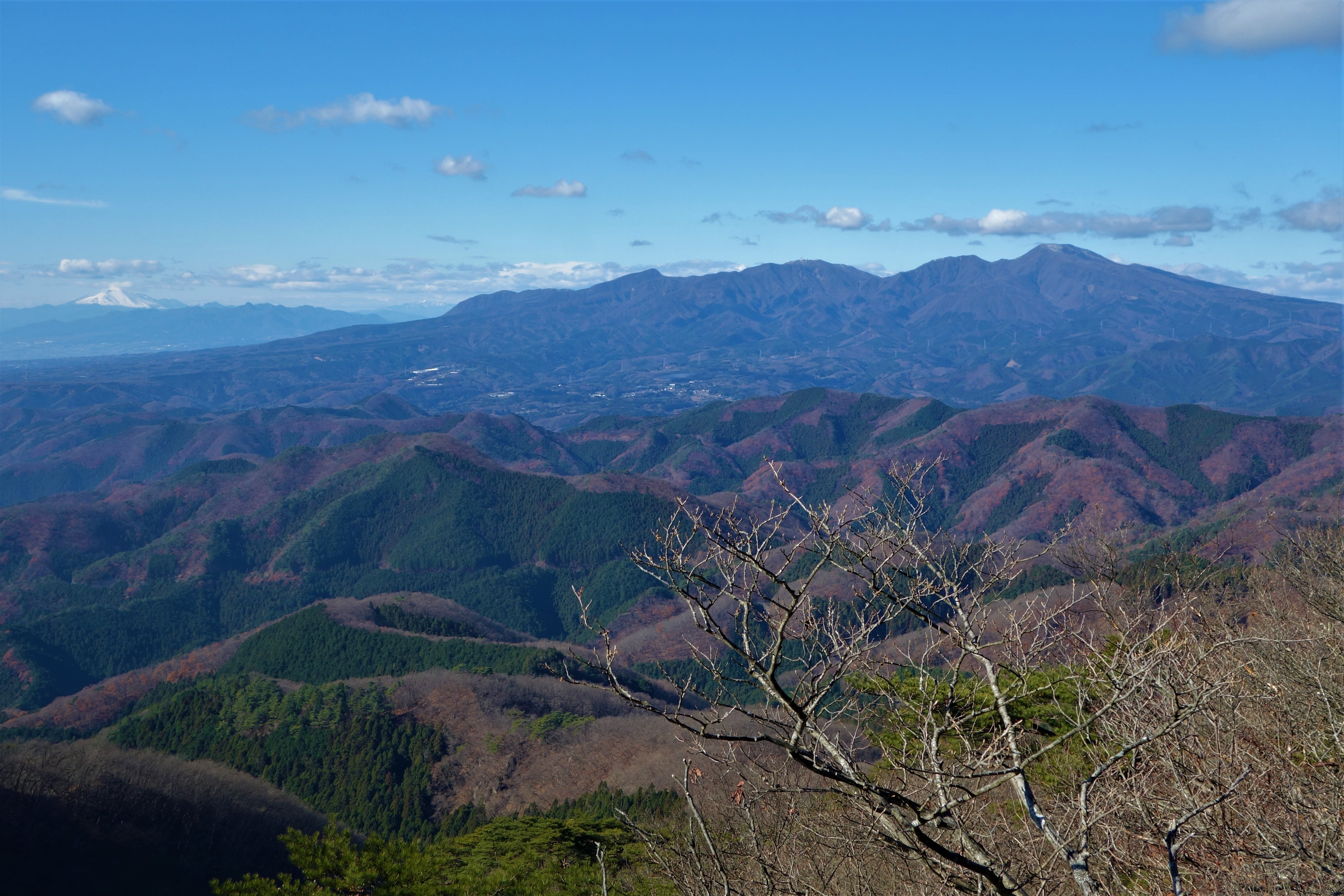
ESE side

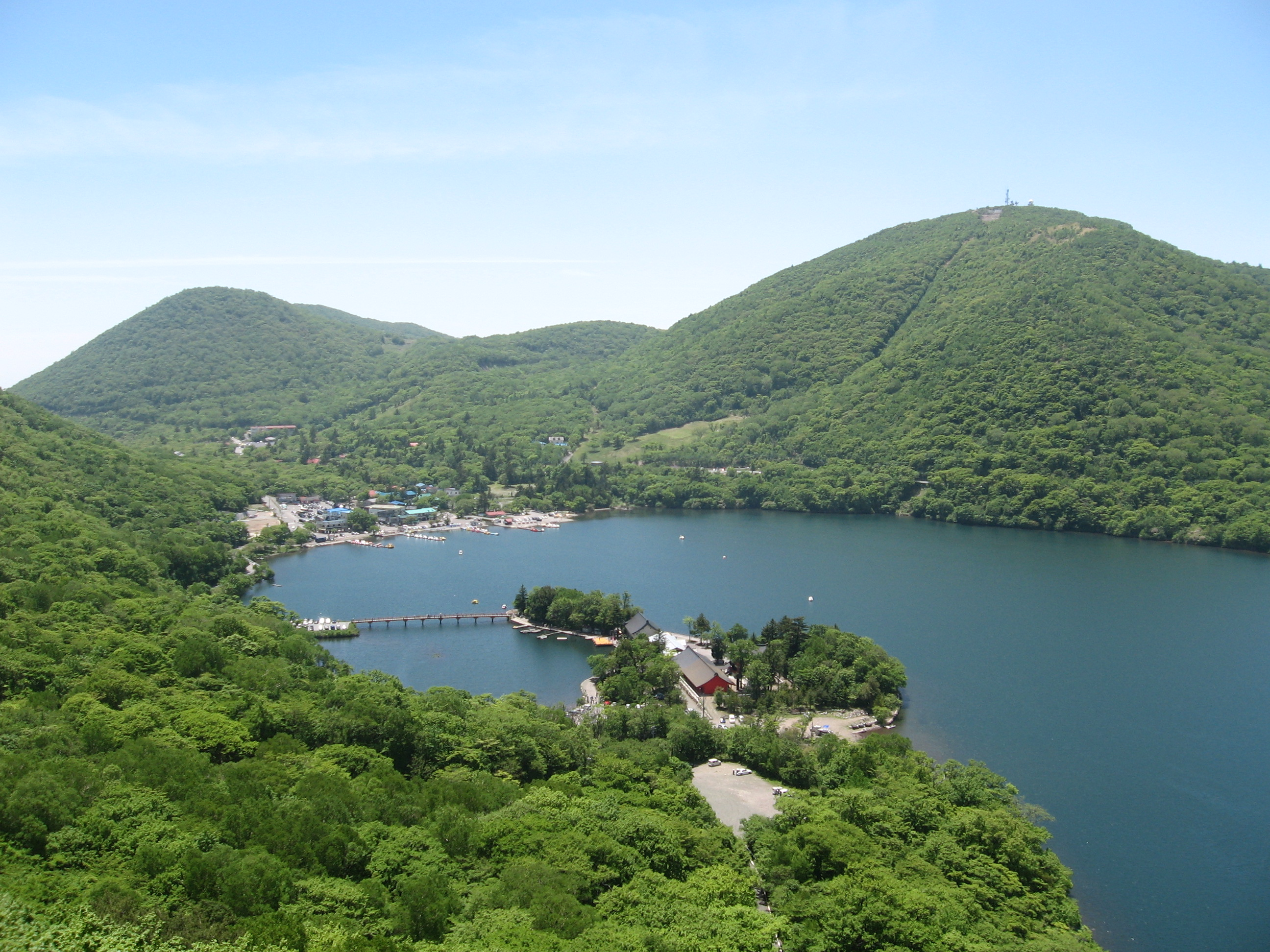
Lake Ōno and Mount Jizo and Akagi Shrine in summer

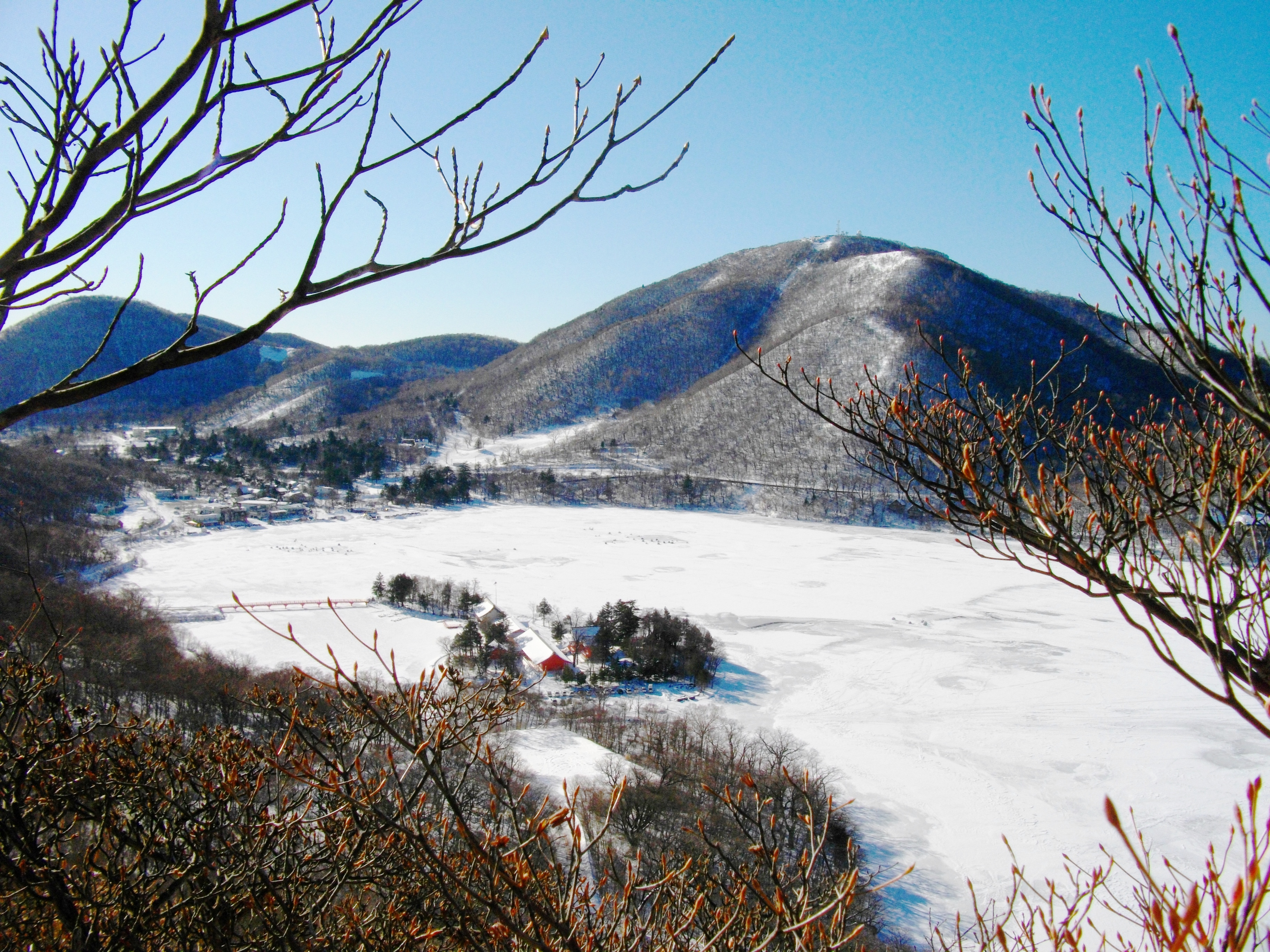
Lake Ōno and Mount Jizo in winter

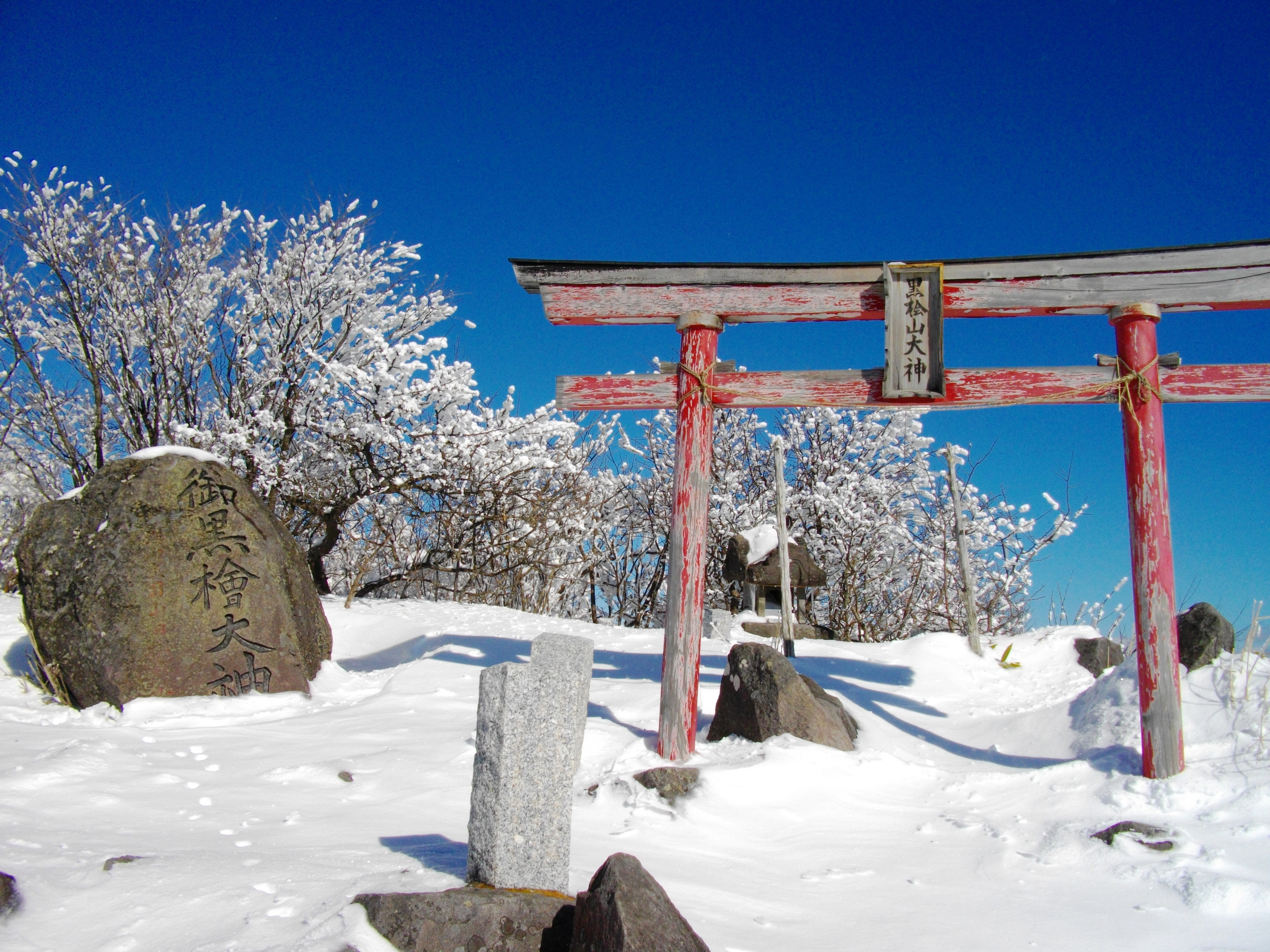
Kurobi Ōkami Shrine near the top of Mount Kurobi

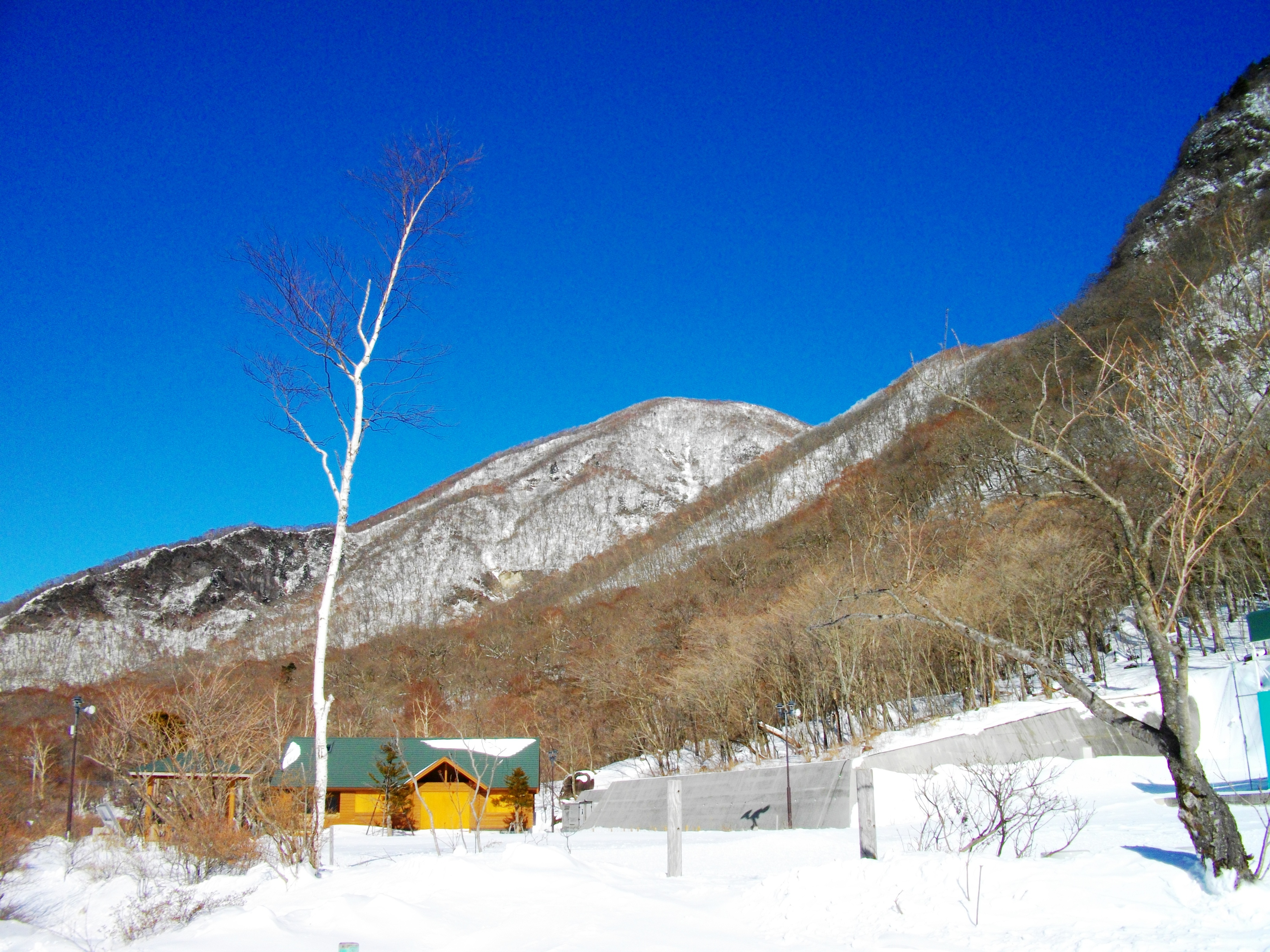
Mount Kurobi from Akagi Hiroba Bus Stop
