= List of cultural properties of Japan – structures (Gunma) =

This list is of the cultural properties of Japan designated in the category of structures (建造物, kenzōbutsu) for the Prefecture of Gunma.

== National Cultural Properties ==
As of 1 May 2015, twenty one Important Cultural Properties (including one *National Treasure) with sixty component structures have been designated, being of national significance.

| Property | Date | Municipality | Comments | Image | Coordinates | Ref. |
|---|---|---|---|---|---|---|
| *Former Tomioka Silk Mill 旧富岡製糸場 kyū-Tomioka seishi jō | 1872-4 | Tomioka | designation comprises nine components: the silk-reeling plant and east and west cocoon warehouses (National Treasures of 1872), and steam boiler plant and water disposal system (1872), director's mansion, dormitory for female instructors, and inspector's house (1873), and iron water tank (1874); inscribed on the UNESCO World Heritage List | | 36°15′19″N 138°53′15″E | |
| Akusawa Family Residence 阿久沢家住宅; Akusawa-ke jūtaku | 1661-1750 | Maebashi | | | 36°27′05″N 139°10′06″E | |
| Usui Pass Railway Facilities 碓氷峠鉄道施設; Usui-tōge tetsudō shisetsu | 1893-1912 | Annaka | designation comprises seventeen components: five bridges and ten tunnels (1893), and the former Maruyama Substation battery room and machine room (1912) | | 36°21′18″N 138°42′20″E | |
| Kasa Sotōba 笠卒塔婆 kasa sotōba | 1356 | Shibukawa | | | 36°29′16″N 138°59′42″E | |
| Nukisaki Jinja 貫前神社; Nukisaki Jinja | 1635 | Tomioka | designation comprises three components: the honden, haiden, and rōmon | | 36°15′19″N 138°51′28″E | |
| Marunuma Dam 丸沼堰堤; Marunuma entei | 1931 | Katashina | | | 36°49′26″N 139°20′23″E | |
| Former Gunma Prefecture Health Office 旧群馬県衛生所 kyū-Gunma-ken eisei-jo | 1878 | Kiryū | | | 36°24′44″N 139°18′34″E | |
| Former Tobe Family Residence 旧戸部家住宅 kyū-Tobe-ke jūtaku | 1661-1750 | Minakami | | | 36°46′16″N 138°58′06″E | |
| Former Kurosawa Family Residence 旧黒澤家住宅 kyū-Kurosawa-ke jūtaku | 1830-67 | Ueno | | | 36°05′14″N 138°44′10″E | |
| Former Ubukata Family Residence 旧生方家住宅 kyū-Ubukata-ke jūtaku | 1661-1750 | Numata | | | 36°38′55″N 139°02′24″E | |
| Former Moteki Family Residence 旧茂木家住宅 kyū-Moteki-ke jūtaku | 1661-1750 | Tomioka | | | 36°14′51″N 138°50′46″E | |
| Tamamura Hachimangū Honden 玉村八幡宮本殿; Tamamura Hachimangū honden | 1573-1614 | Tamamura | | | 36°18′18″N 139°06′32″E | |
| Haruna Jinja 榛名神社; Haruna Jinja | 1716-1914 | Takasaki | designation comprises six components: the honsha-heiden-haiden (1914), koku sosha-gakuden (1716–35), kagura-den (1764), sōryūmon (1855), miyuki-den (1856), and zuishinmon (1847) | | 36°27′31″N 138°51′08″E | |
| Chōraku-ji Hōtō 長楽寺宝塔; Chōrakuji Hōtō | 1276 | Ōta | | | 36°15′46″N 139°16′30″E | |
| Tōba 塔婆; Tōba | 801 | Kiryū | | | 36°25′44″N 139°13′14″E | |
| Tōshō-gū 東照宮; Tōshō-gū | 1615-44 | Ōta | designation comprises three components: the honden and karamon (1644), and haiden (1615-24) | | 36°15′43″N 139°16′30″E | |
| Hikobe Family Residence 彦部家住宅; Hikobe-ke jūtaku | 1501-1867 | Kiryū | designation comprises five components: main residence (1501-1600), nagayamon (1661-1750), and fuyuzumi, bunkogura, and kokugura (1830-1867) | | 36°22′25″N 139°20′54″E | |
| Tomizawa Family Residence 富沢家住宅; Tomizawa-ke jūtaku | 1792 | Tomioka | | | 36°39′46″N 138°51′19″E | |
| Myōgi Jinja 妙義神社; Myōgi Jinja | 1756-73 | Tomioka | designation comprises three components: the honden-heiden-haiden and karamon (1756), and sōmon (1773) | | 36°18′02″N 138°45′45″E | |
| Yakushi-dō 薬師堂; Yakushi-dō | 1867 | Nakanojō | | | 36°36′51″N 138°47′56″E | |
| Raiden Jinja Massha Hachimangū Inari Jinja Shaden 雷電神社末社八幡宮稲荷神社社殿; Raiden Jinja massha Hachimangū Inari Jinja shaden | 1547 | Itakura | | | 36°13′40″N 139°36′28″E | |

== Prefectural Cultural Properties ==
As of 24 March 2015, fifty-three properties have been designated at a prefectural level.

| Property | Date | Municipality | Comments | Image | Coordinates | Ref. |
|---|---|---|---|---|---|---|
| Tainei-ji Sanmon 泰寧寺山門; Taineiji sanmon | | Minakami | | | 36°41′56″N 138°53′40″E | |
| Kūe-ji Sanmon 空恵寺山門; Kūeji sanmon | | Shibukawa | | | 36°33′20″N 139°01′04″E | |
| Chōraku-ji Chokushimon 長楽寺の勅使門; Chōrakuji no chokushimon | | Ōta | | | 36°15′46″N 139°16′30″E | |
| Matsuida Hachimangū Honden 松井田八幡宮本殿; Matsuida Hachimangū honden | | Annaka | | | 36°18′59″N 138°47′53″E | |
| Fudō-ji Niōmon 不動寺の仁王門; Fudōji Niōmon | | Annaka | | | 36°18′58″N 138°48′02″E | |
| Myōgi Jinja 妙義神社随神門・袖廻廊・銅鳥居・石垣; Myōgi Jinja zuishinmon・sode kairō・dō-torii・ishigaki | | Tomioka | designation comprises four components: the zuishinmon, kairō, bronze torii, and stone walls | | 36°18′02″N 138°45′45″E | |
| Shibukawa Hachimangū Honden 渋川八幡宮本殿; Shibukawa Hachimangū honden | | Shibukawa | | | 36°30′06″N 138°59′24″E | |
| Kōzuke Sōja Jinja Honden 上野総社神社本殿; Kōzuke Sōja Jinja honden | | Maebashi | | | 36°23′17″N 139°02′16″E | |

== Municipal Cultural Properties ==
As of 1 May 2014, three hundred and eleven properties have been designated at a municipal level.

== Registered Cultural Properties ==
As of 1 May 2015, three hundred and sixteen properties at one hundred and seventeen sites have been registered (as opposed to designated) at a national level.

| Property | Date | Municipality | Comments | Image | Coordinates | Ref. |
|---|---|---|---|---|---|---|
| Gunma Prefectural Government Office Building 群馬県庁本庁舎; Gunma-kenchō honchōsha | 1928 | Maebashi | | | 36°23′28″N 139°03′39″E | |
| Suidōyama Kinenkan 水道山記念館（旧配水事務所） Suidōyama kinenkan (kyū-haisui jimusho) | 1932 | Kiryū | former water distribution office | | 36°25′01″N 139°19′53″E | |
| MAEHARA 20th MAEHARA 20th（旧合名会社飯塚織物工場） Maehara tōentei-su (kyū-gōmeigaisha Iizuka orimono kōjō) | 1932 | Kiryū | former Iizuka Partnership textile factory | | 36°22′19″N 139°21′03″E | |
| Kanazen Building 金善ビル; Kanazen biru | 1921 | Kiryū | | | 36°24′42″N 139°20′21″E | |

== See also ==
- Cultural Properties of Japan
- National Treasures of Japan
- List of Historic Sites of Japan (Gunma)
- List of Cultural Properties of Japan - paintings (Gunma)
