= Harunasan Ropeway =

Aerial lift line in Haruna, Gunma, Japan

Coordinates: 36°28′25″N 138°52′39.1″E

- Interactive map of Harunasan Ropeway

Overview
- Status: Operational
- Character: Aerial tramway
- System: Gondola lift
- Location: Mount Haruna in Haruna, Gunma, Japan
- No. of stations: 2
- Open: 1929

Operation
- Operator: Tanigawadake Ropeway Company
- Carrier capacity: 15 Passengers per cabin, 2 cabins
- Trip duration: 3 min

Technical features
- Line length: 527 m (1,729 ft)
- No. of cables: 1
- Operating speed: 4.0 m/s
- Vertical Interval: 269 m (883 ft)

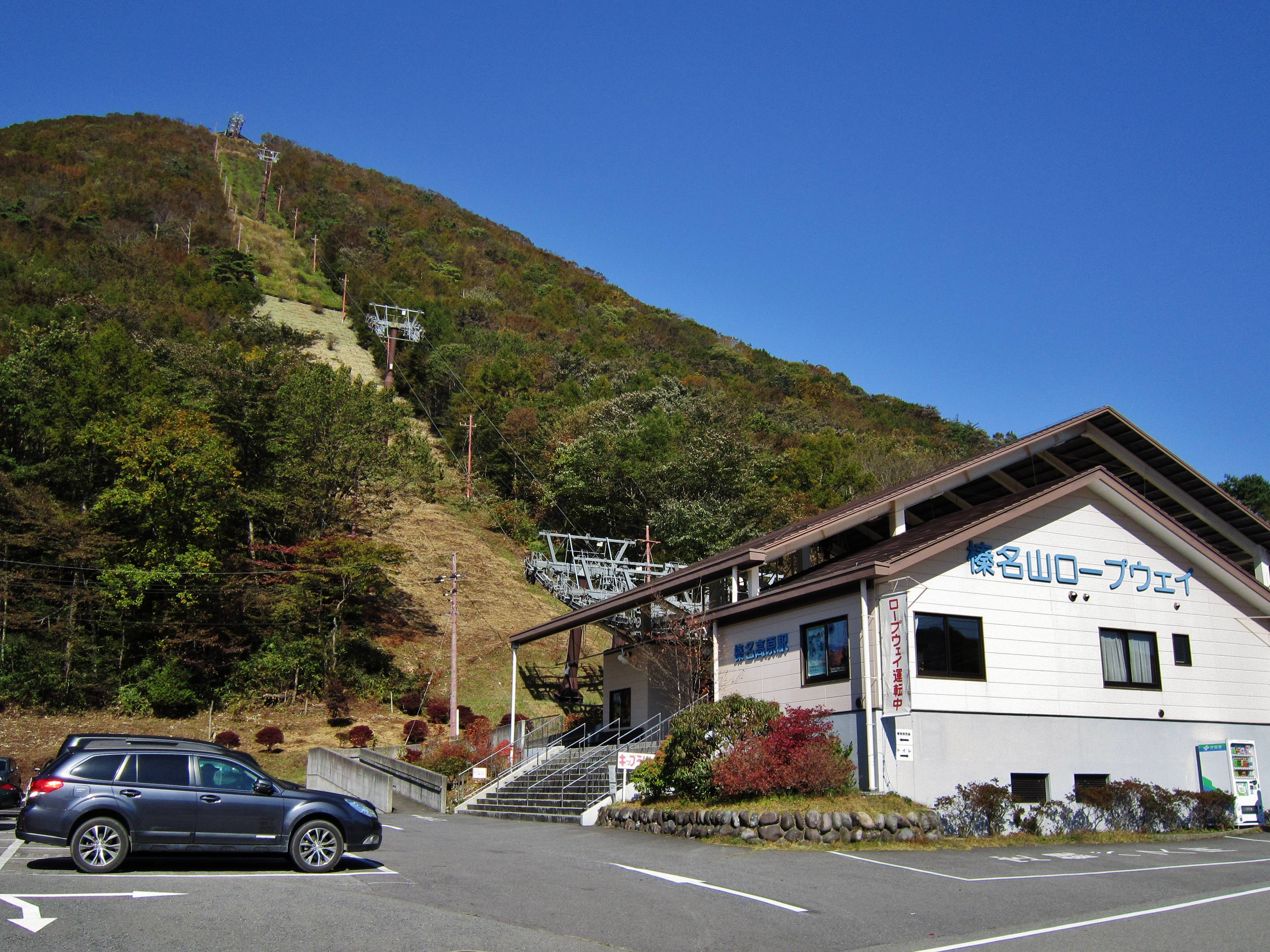
Haruna-Kōgen Station

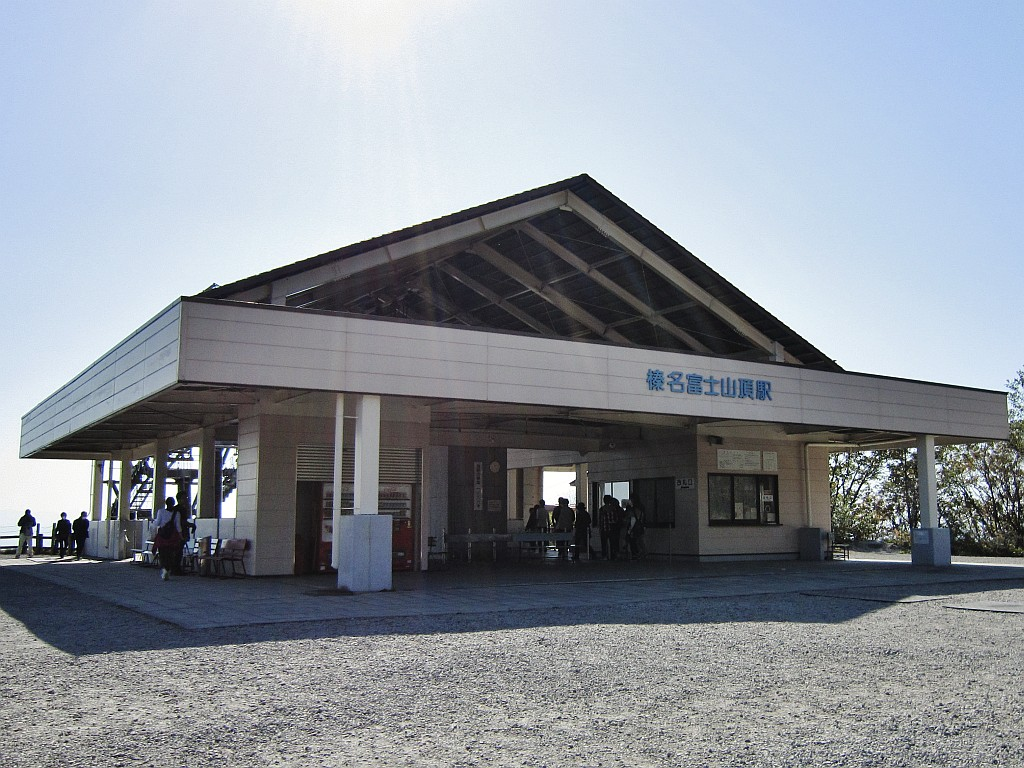
Harunafuji-Sanchō Station

The Harunasan Ropeway (榛名山ロープウェイ, Harunasan Rōpuwei) is a Japanese aerial lift line in Haruna, Gunma, operated by Tanigawadake Ropeway Company. The Tōbu Group company also operates another aerial lift line, Tanigawadake Ropeway. The line climbs to the summit of Mount Haruna. The line opened in 1929, and refurbished in 1996 to the current system, which two smaller cabins are attached.

== Basic data ==
- Cable length: 527 m (1,729 ft)
- Vertical interval: 269 m (883 ft)

== See also ==
- List of aerial lifts in Japan
