= Gunma (disambiguation) =

Gunma may refer to:

- Gunma Prefecture, prefecture in Japan
  - Gunma District, Gunma, former district in the prefecture
  - Gunma, Gunma, former town in the district
- Kisaragi Gunma (如月 群真), hentai manga artist
