= Takasaki-Shōka-Daigakumae Station =

Railway station in Takasaki, Gunma Prefecture, Japan

Takasaki-Shōka-Daigakumae Station 高崎商科大学前駅
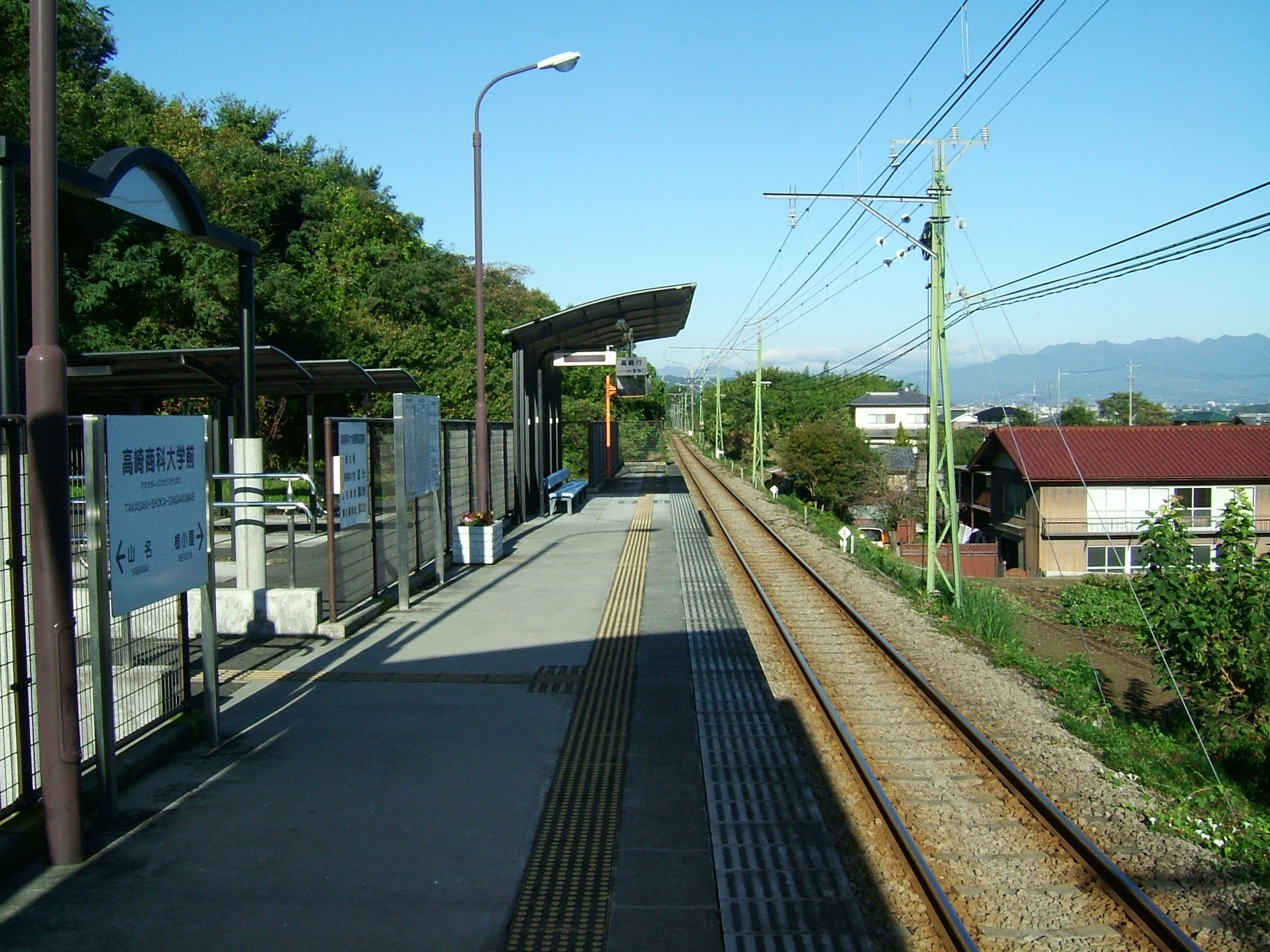
- Takasakishōkadaigakumae Station, October 2008

General information
- Location: Negoya-machi, Takasaki-shi, Gunma-ken 370-1214; Japan
- Coordinates: 36°17′3.47″N 139°01′46.57″E
- Operator: Jōshin Dentetsu
- Line: ■ Jōshin Line
- Distance: 5.0 km from Takasaki
- Platforms: 1 side platform

Other information
- Status: Unstaffed
- Website: Official website

History
- Opened: 17 March 2002

Passengers
- FY2019: 205

Services
Preceding station	Joshin Electric Railway	Following station
Yamana towards Shimonita	Jōshin Line	Negoya towards Takasaki
Location
- Location within Gunma Prefecture Location within Japan

Takasaki-Shōka-Daigakumae Station (高崎商科大学前駅, Takasaki-Shōka-Daigakumae -eki) is a passenger railway station in the city of Takasaki, Gunma, Japan, operated by the private railway operator Jōshin Dentetsu.

== Lines ==
Takasaki-Shōka-Daigakumae Station is a station on the Jōshin Line and is 5.0 kilometers from the terminus of the line at Takasaki.

== Station layout ==
The station consists of a single side platform serving traffic in both directions. The station is unattended

== History ==
Takasaki-Shōka-Daigakumae Station opened on 17 March 2002.

== Surrounding area ==
- Takasaki University of Commerce
- Takasaki University of Commerce Junior College

== See also ==
- List of railway stations in Japan
