= Ramen Teh =

2018 Singaporean-Japanese-French film

Ramen Teh Ramen Shop 情牽拉麵茶
- Film poster
- Directed by: Eric Khoo
- Screenplay by: Fong Cheng Tan; Kim Hoh Wong
- Produced by: Fong Cheng Tan; Junxiang Huang; Yutaka Tachibana
- Starring: Takumi Saito; Jeanette Aw; Seiko Matsuda; Mark Lee; Tsuyoshi Ihara; Tetsuya Bessho; Beatrice Chien
- Cinematography: Brian Gothong Tan
- Edited by: Natalie Soh
- Music by: Kevin Mathews; Christine Sham
- Production company: Zhao Wei Films
- Distributed by: MK2 Films
- Release dates: 29 March 2018 (Singapore); 3 October 2018 (France); 9 March 2019 (Japan)
- Running time: 89 minutes
- Countries: Singapore; Japan; France
- Languages: Japanese; English; Mandarin

Ramen Teh (Chinese: 情牽拉麵茶), also known as Ramen Shop (or in Japanese, 家族のレシピ, Kazoku no Recipe, "Family Recipe"), is a Singaporean-Japanese-French film directed by Eric Khoo and starring Takumi Saito, Jeanette Aw, Seiko Matsuda, Mark Lee, Tsuyoshi Ihara, Tetsuya Bessho, and Beatrice Chien.

Ramen Teh had its world premiere at the Berlin International Film Festival in February 2018 and was released in Singapore on 29 March 2018.

== Premise ==
Masato is a young ramen chef in the city of Takasaki in Japan. After the sudden death of his emotionally distant father, he chances upon a suitcase of memorabilia and a red notebook – filled with musings and old photos – left behind by his Singaporean mother who died when he was just ten years old. Acting on a hunch, he takes off for Singapore with the notebook, hoping to piece together the story of his life, as well as that of his parents. There he meets Miki, a Japanese food blogger and single mother who helps him track down his maternal uncle Ah Wee, who runs a bak kut teh stall. Masato discovers that his grandmother Madam Lee is still alive, and that she holds the key to the tender yet turbulent love story of his parents. Masato and his grandmother try to heal each other's broken souls, and find salvation in the kitchen where the meals they cook become more than the sum of their ingredients.

== Cast ==
- Takumi Saito (斎藤工) as Masato
- Jeanette Aw as Mei Lian
- Seiko Matsuda (松田聖子) as Miki
- Mark Lee as Uncle Wee
- Tsuyoshi Ihara (伊原剛志) as Kazuo
- Tetsuya Bessho (別所哲也) as Uncle Akio
- Beatrice Chien as Madam Lee

== Production ==
=== Filming ===
Principal photography began in July 2017, in Singapore. Several recurring scenes were filmed in the Jigen-in Temple, located at the summit of Mt. Kannonyama in Takasaki, Japan, featuring the majestic Takasaki Byakue Dai-Kannon.

Japanese chef Keisuke Takeda and Singapore food blogger Dr Leslie Tay were tapped to consult on the culinary scenes in the film.

== Release ==
The film premiered as the closing film of the Culinary Cinema section at the Berlin International Film Festival on 23 February 2018.

== Reception ==
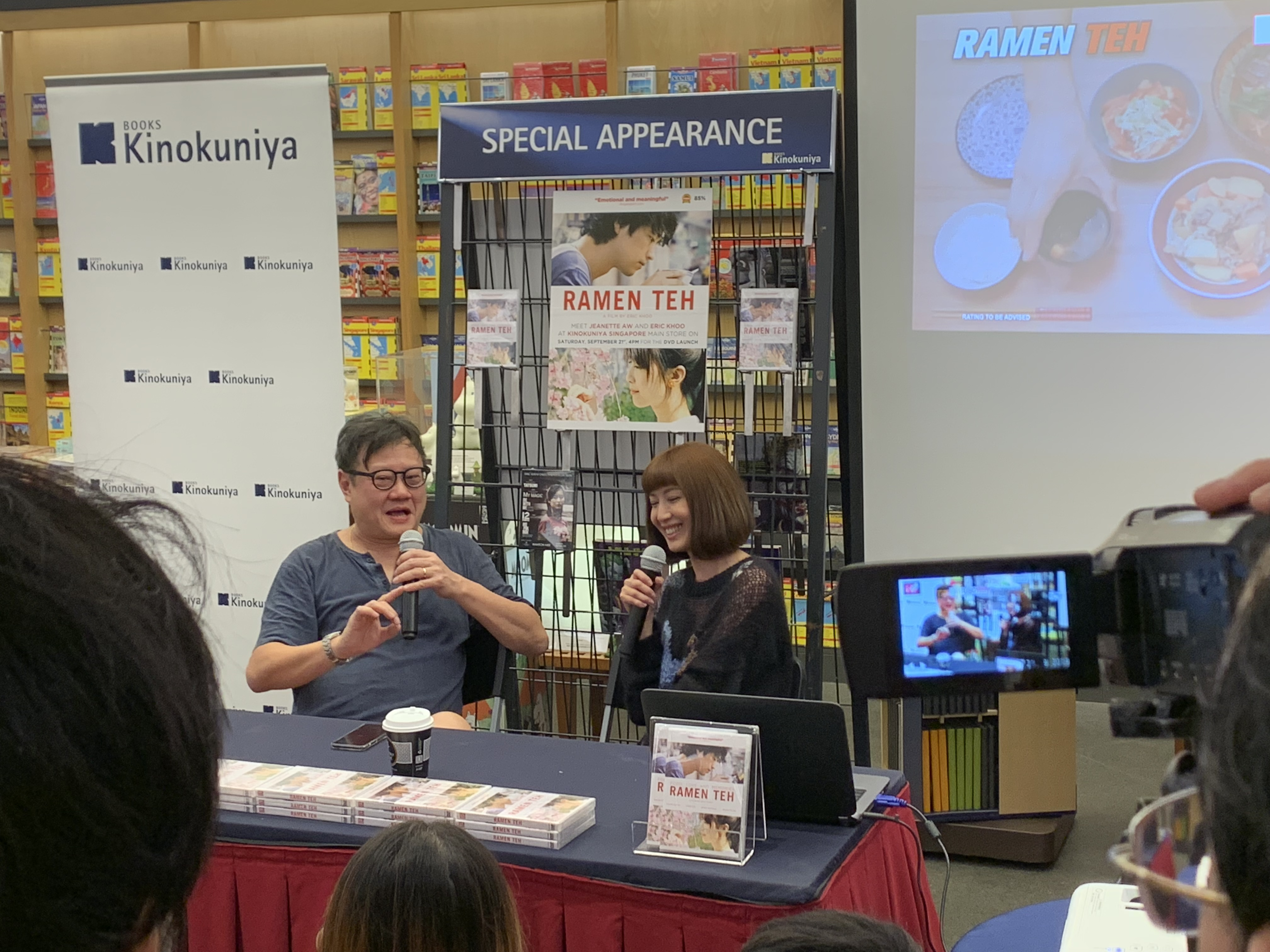
Eric Khoo and Jeanette Aw At Books Kinokuniya, Ngee Ann City, Singapore For the DVD Premiere of Ramen Teh

=== Box office ===
In limited reporting, Ramen Teh grossed $26,149 in Colombia, $9,384 in Czech Republic, $472,940 in France and $72,984 in Spain.

=== Critical response ===
Ramen Teh received positive reviews and currently holds an aggregate of 86% at Rotten Tomatoes, based on 42 reviews. The site's critical consensus reads, "On a filmmaking level, Ramen Shop may not be quite as rich and flavorful as the cuisine it celebrates, but it's still a largely satisfying -- and hunger-inducing -- experience." Maggie Lee of Variety stated that "derivative aspects aside, this simple and direct celebration of Singapore’s culinary heritage goes down easy". Allan Hunter of Screen International wrote in his review, "Khoo's gentle drama may be too slight and sentimental for some tastes but it is handled with a sincerity that could commend it to incurable romantics and insatiable foodies alike".
