= Gunma, Gunma =

Dissolved municipality in Gunma prefecture, Japan

Gunma (群馬町, Gunma-machi) was a town located in Gunma District, Gunma Prefecture, Japan.

As of 2005, the town had an estimated population of 36,569 and a density of 1,666.77 persons per km^{2}. The total area was 21.94 km^{2}.

On January 23, 2006, Gunma, along with the towns of Kurabuchi and Misato (all from Gunma District), and the town of Shinmachi (from Tano District), was merged into the expanded city of Takasaki.

Gunma is located in the centre of Gunma Prefecture, and on a gentle slope between the foot of southeast Mt. Haruna and Maebashi plateau.

Although Jōetsu Shinkansen passes the section of Takasaki, there is no station.

Also, Kan-etsu Expressway passes in the section of Takasaki, but there is no interchange (the nearest one is Maebashi IC).
