= Ikuei Junior College =

Private junior college in Takasaki, Gunma, Japan

Coordinates: 36°20′58.3″N 139°3′2.8″E

- 育英短期大学
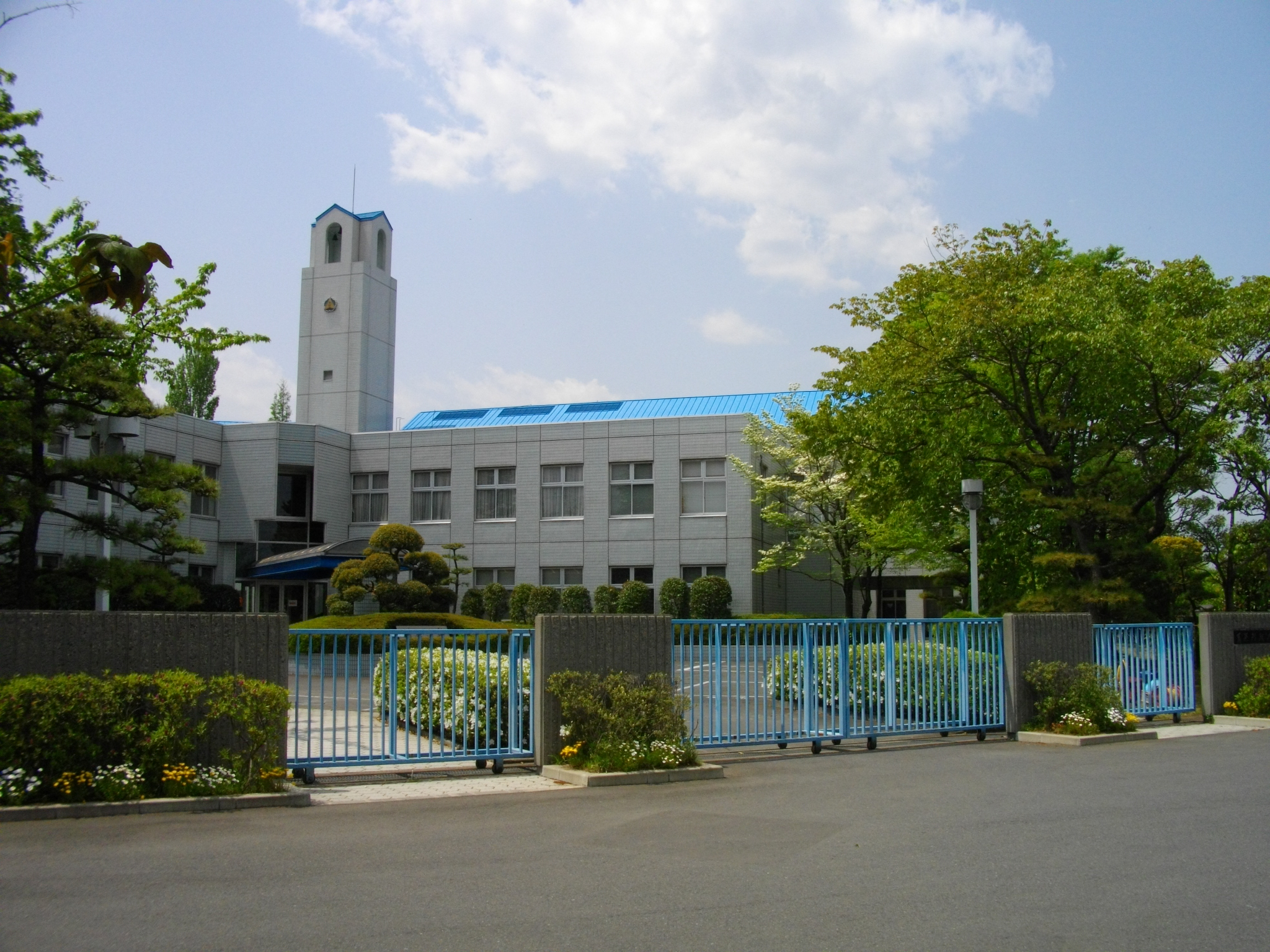
- Type: Private
- Established: Founded 1970; Chartered 1977
- Location: Takasaki, Gunma, Japan
- Website: Official website

Ikuei Junior College (育英短期大学, Ikuei tanki daigaku) is a private junior college in Takasaki, Gunma, Japan, established in 1977, and located in Takasaki since 1987. Originally a women's college, it became co-educational from 2010.
