= Yoshii, Gunma =

Former town in Gunma prefecture, Japan

Yoshii (吉井町, Yoshii-machi) was a town located in Tano District, Gunma Prefecture, Japan.

As of September 1, 2007, the town had an estimated population of 24,758 and a density of 424.30 persons per km^{2}. The total area was 58.35 km^{2}.

== Geography ==
Located in southern Gunma Prefecture, the majority of the land is flat or slightly hilly, making the town fit for farming. The Kabura River flows through, and the town is situated in a suburban area, with the large city of Takasaki to the east.

== History ==
- 1889: the town of Yoshii, and the villages of Irino and Tagoare created in Tago District; and the village of Iwadaira was created in Kitakanra District.
- 1896: Tago District is renamed to Tano District after it is merged with Midorino District and Minamikanra District.
- 1950: Kitakanra District is renamed Kanra District.
- 1955: Yoshii absorbed the villages of Irino, Iwadaira and Tago, to become an expanded town of Yoshii.
- A planned merger of municipalities was implemented on June 1, 2009; Yoshii was merged into the expanded city of Takasaki.

== Surrounding municipalities ==
- Gunma Prefecture
  - Fujioka
  - Takasaki
  - Tomioka
  - Annaka
  - Kanra
