= Shinmachi, Gunma =

Former town in Gunma prefecture, Japan

Coordinates: 35°02′N 132°54′E

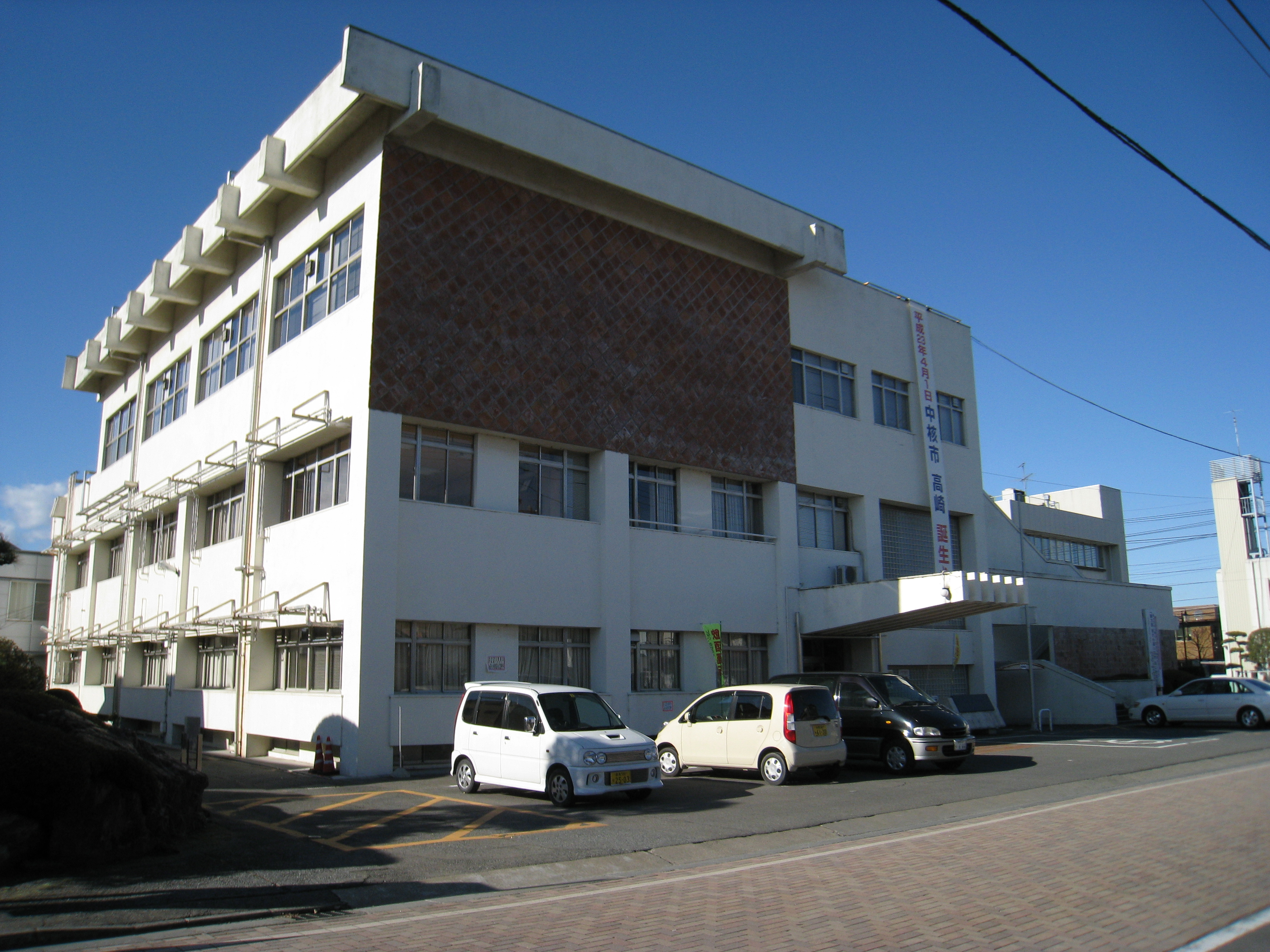
former Shinmachi Town Hall

Shinmachi (新町, Shinmachi) was a town located in Tano District, Gunma Prefecture, Japan.

As of 2003, the town had an estimated population of 12,561 and a population density of 3,358.56 persons per km^{2}. The total area was 3.74 km^{2}. The town is located approximately 80 to 90 km north of Tokyo, and has developed as a commuter town in Fujioka, Takasaki, and the Tokyo metropolitan area. On January 23, 2006, Shinmachi, along with the towns of Gunma, Kurabuchi and Misato (all from Gunma District), was merged into the expanded city of Takasaki.
