= Niijima Gakuen Junior College =

Coordinates: 36.337350°N 139.004810°E

- 新島学園短期大学
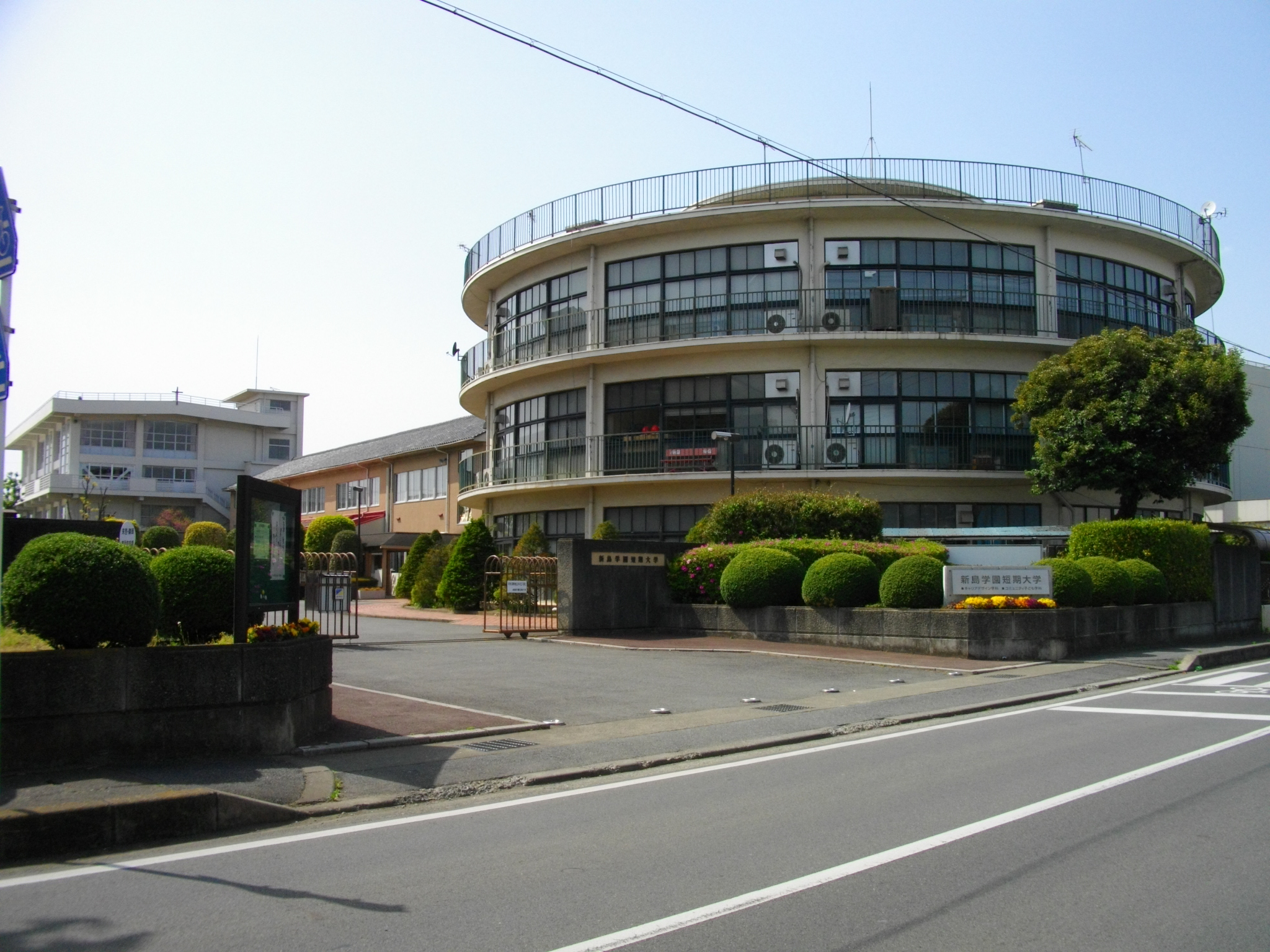
- Type: Private
- Established: 1983
- Location: Takasaki, Gunma, Japan
- Website: Official website

Niijima Gakuen Junior College (新島学園短期大学, Niijima gakuen tanki daigaku) is a private junior college in Takasaki, Gunma, Japan. Originally established as a women's junior college in 1983, it became co-educational in 2004.
