= Haruna, Gunma =

Town in Japan

Haruna (榛名町, Haruna-machi) was a town located in Gunma District, Gunma Prefecture, Japan.

As of June 30, 2004, the town had an estimated population of 22,303 and a total area of 93.59 km^{2}.

On October 1, 2006, Haruna was merged into the expanded city of Takasaki.

== Geography ==
Located in central Gunma Prefecture, the town is slightly hilly. The town got its name from the mountain in which it is situated on the slopes of, Mount Haruna.

- Mountain: Mount Haruna
- Lake: Lake Haruna

== Surrounding municipalities ==
- Gunma Prefecture
  - Shibukawa
  - Takasaki
  - Annaka
  - Higashiagatsuma

== Sister cities ==
=== In Japan ===
- Higashikurume, Tokyo

=== Overseas ===
- (United States) Grandview, Missouri

== Trivia ==
- Haruna is known as Akina in the anime/manga Initial D, and is the main character Takumi's home.
