= Kurabuchi, Gunma =

Dissolved municipality in Gunma prefecture, Japan

Flag

Kurabuchi (倉渕町, Kurabuchi-machi) was a town located in Gunma District, Gunma Prefecture, Japan.

As of 2003, the town had an estimated population of 4,535 and a density of 35.64 persons per km^{2}. The total area was 127.26 km^{2}.

On January 23, 2006, Kurabuchi, along with the towns of Gunma and Misato (all from Gunma District), and the town of Shinmachi (from Tano District), was merged into the expanded city of Takasaki.

Because of its rural nature and small population, Kurabuchi was often referred to by its previous village designation of (倉渕村; -mura).

It was a popular spot for visiting hot springs and fishing for trout.

It is also home to Kurabuchi English Village; it runs programs for children to learn English as well as connect with nature and traditional Japanese culture.
