= Tanigawadake Ropeway =

Cable car line on Mount Tanigawa, Gunma, Japan

Coordinates: 36°49′40.1″N 138°57′22.2″E

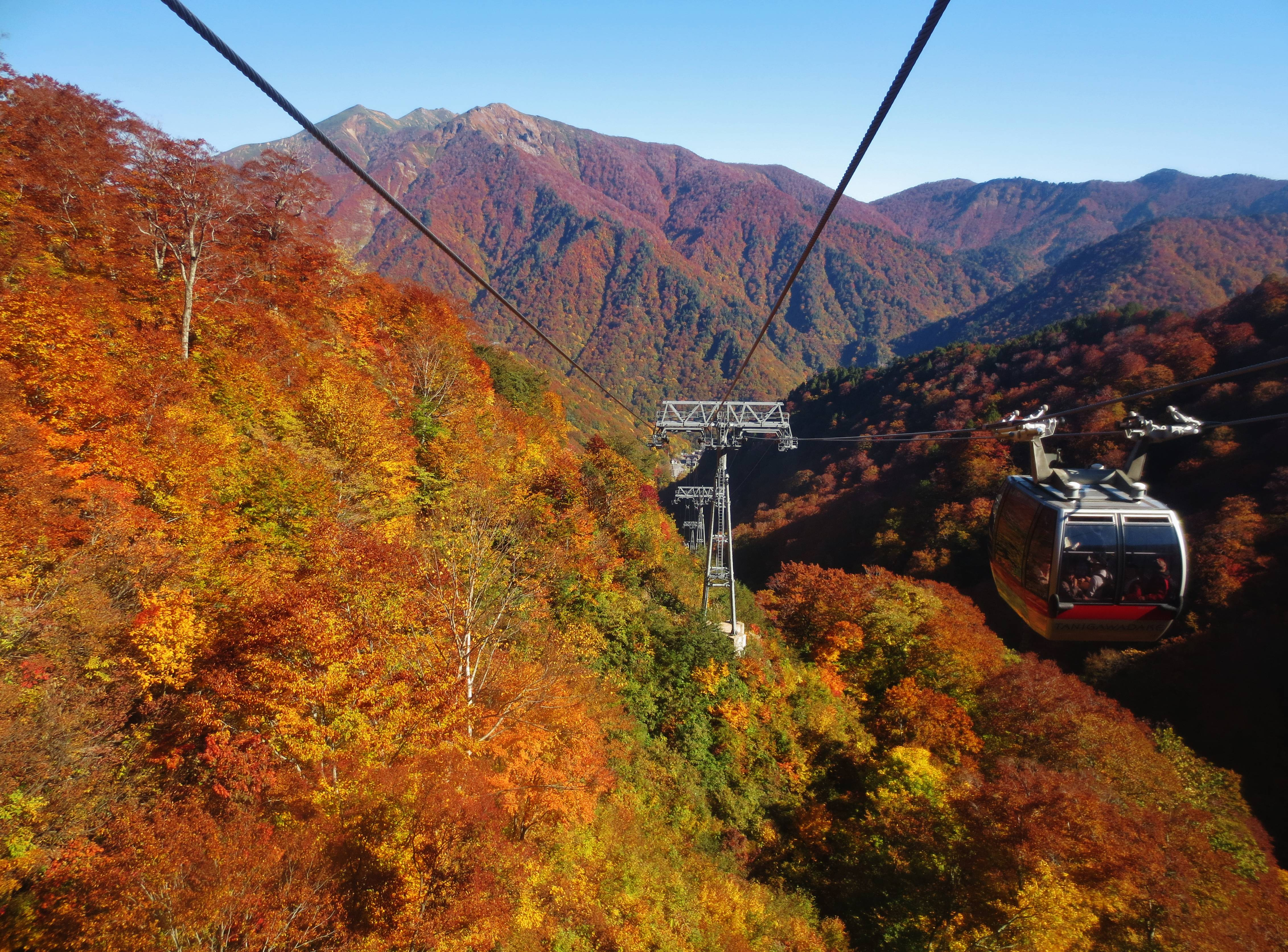
Tanigawadake Ropeway

The Tanigawadake Ropeway (谷川岳ロープウェイ, Tanigawadake Rōpuwei) is a Japanese cable car line, operated by Tanigawadake Ropeway Company. The Tōbu Group company also operates another aerial lift line, Harunasan Ropeway. Opened in 1960, the line climbs Mount Tanigawa Tenjindaira Ski Resort, Minakami, Gunma. The line is operated all seasons, transporting skiers, hikers, or tourists.

== Basic data ==
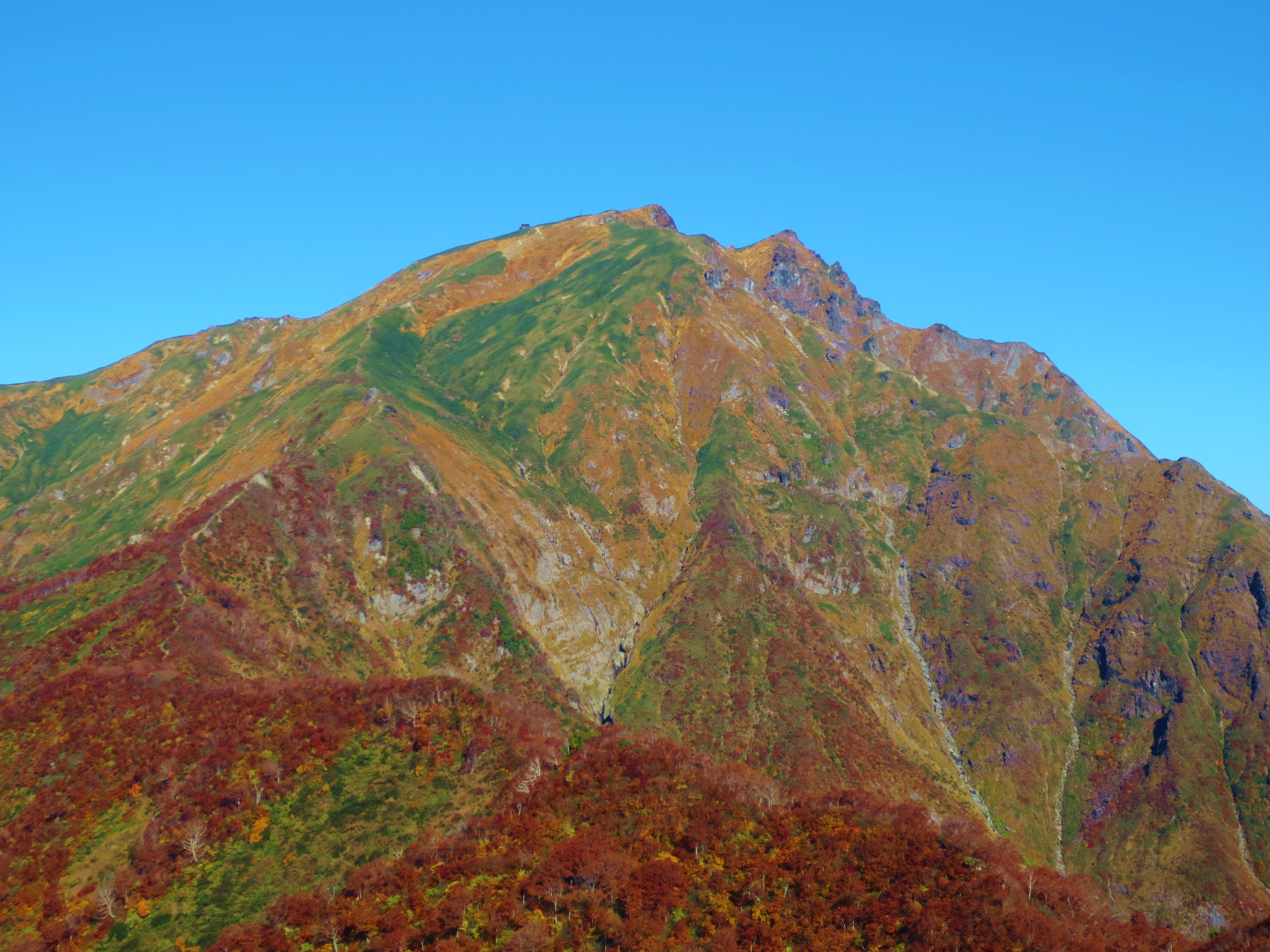
Mount Tanigawa

- System:
  - Until August 2005: Gondola lift, 3 cables
  - From September 2005: Funitel
- Elevation at top: 1319m
- Distance: 2.3 kilometres (1.4 mi)
- Vertical interval: 573 m (1,880 ft)
- Passenger capacity per a cabin: 22
- Cabins: 14
- Stations: 2
- Time required for single ride: 10 minutes
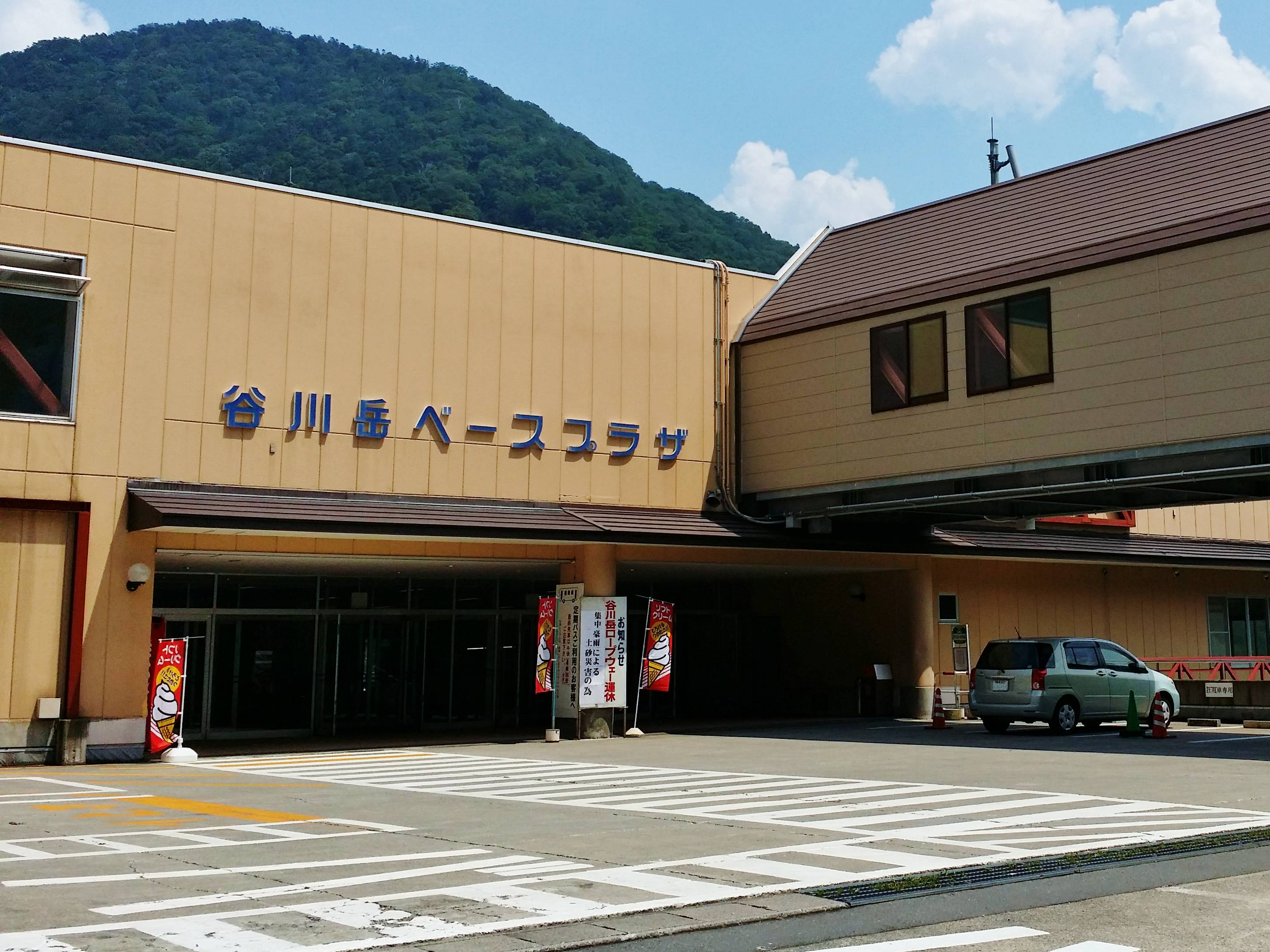
Doaiguchi Station

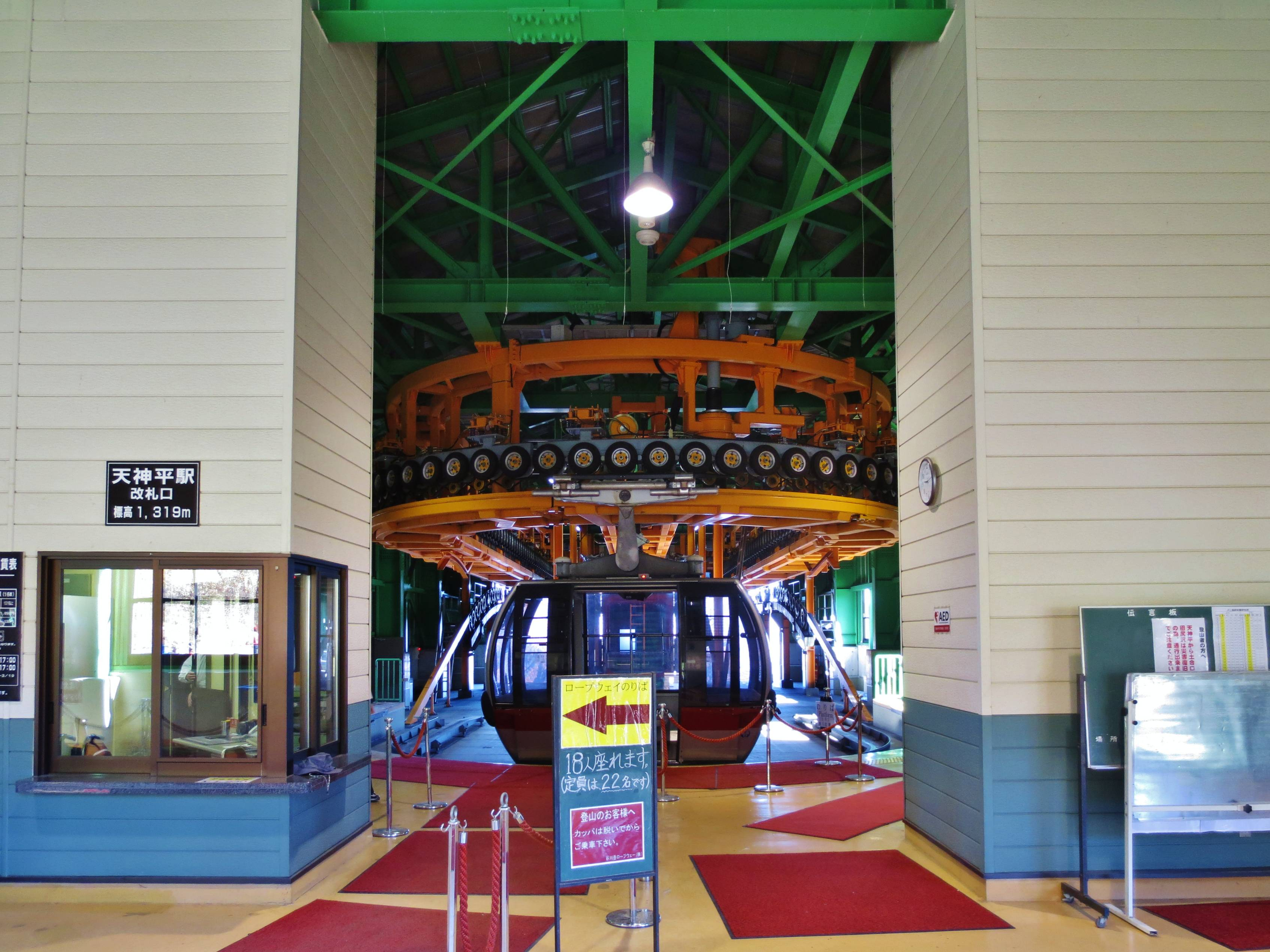
Tenjindaira Station

== See also ==
- List of aerial lifts in Japan
