= Yamana Station =

Railway station in Takasaki, Gunma Prefecture, Japan

Yamana Station 山名駅
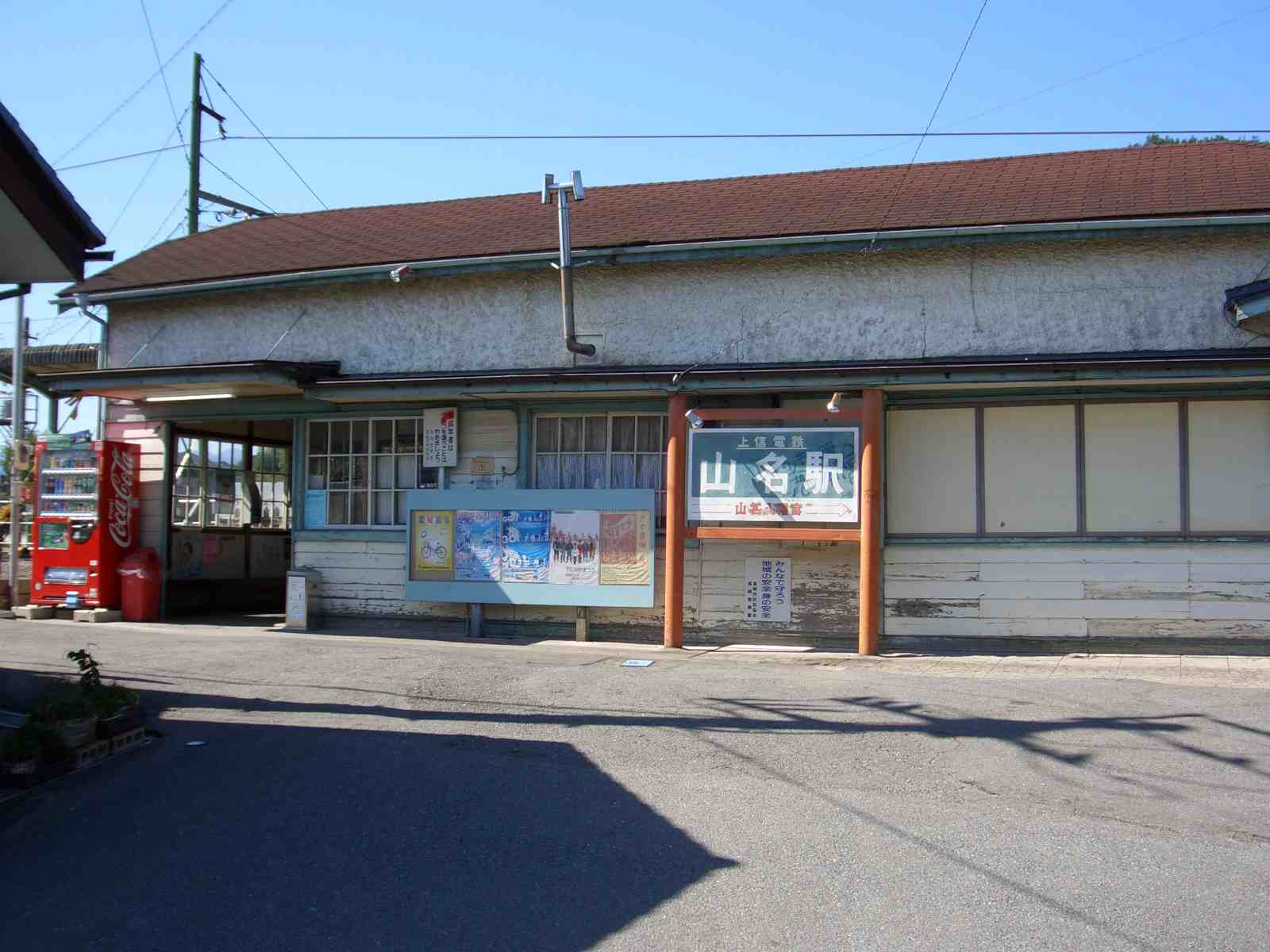
- Yamana Station, October 2006

General information
- Location: Yamana-machi 1515-3, Takasaki-shi, Gunma-ken 370-1213; Japan
- Coordinates: 36°16′39.6″N 139°02′17.61″E
- Operator: Jōshin Dentetsu
- Line: ■ Jōshin Line
- Distance: 6.1 km from Takasaki
- Platforms: 1 island platform

Other information
- Status: Unstaffed
- Website: Official website

History
- Opened: 5 May 1897

Passengers
- FY2019: 129

Services
Preceding station	Joshin Electric Railway	Following station
Nishi-Yamana towards Shimonita	Jōshin Line	Takasaki-Shōka-Daigakumae towards Takasaki
Location
- Location within Gunma Prefecture Location within Japan

Yamana Station (山名駅, Yamana-eki) is a passenger railway station in the city of Takasaki, Gunma, Japan, operated by the private railway operator Jōshin Dentetsu.

== Lines ==
Yamana Station is a station on the Jōshin Line and is 6.1 kilometers from the terminus of the line at Takasaki.

== Station layout ==
The station consists of a single island platform connected to the station building by a level crossing.

=== Platforms ===
1	■ Jōshin Line	for Takasaki
2	■ Jōshin Line	for Shimonita

== History ==
Yamana Station opened on 5 May 1897.

== Surrounding area ==
- Takasaki Yamana Post Office
- Site of Yamana Castle
- Yamana Hachiman-gu

== See also ==
- List of railway stations in Japan
