= Misato, Gunma =

Former town in Gunma prefecture, Japan

Misato (箕郷町, Misato-machi) was a town located in Gunma District, Gunma Prefecture, Japan.

As of 2003, the town had an estimated population of 19,203 and a density of 438.83 persons per km^{2}. The total area was 43.76 km^{2}.

On January 23, 2006, Misato, along with the towns of Gunma and Kurabuchi (all from Gunma District), and the town of Shinmachi (from Tano District), was merged into the expanded city of Takasaki.
