= Mount Haruna =

Dormant volcano in Japan

- 榛名山
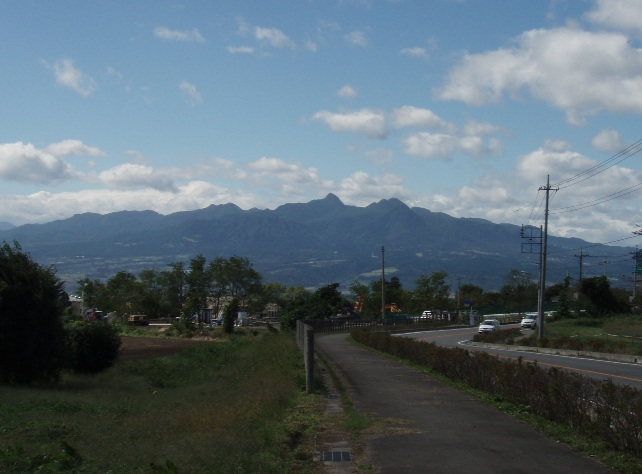
- Haruna volcano from the east

Highest point
- Elevation: 1,449 m (4,754 ft)
- Coordinates: 36°28′37″N 138°52′41″E

Geography
- Location within Japan
- Location: Honshū, Japan

Geology
- Mountain type: Stratovolcano
- Volcanic arc: Northeastern Japan Arc
- Last eruption: 550 CE ± 10 years

Mount Haruna (榛名山, Haruna-san) is a dormant stratovolcano in Gunma Prefecture, in the Kantō region of eastern Honshū, Japan.

== Outline ==
Mount Haruna started to form more than 300,000 years ago and the last known eruption was 550 AD. The volcano has a summit caldera containing the symmetrical cinder cone of Mount Haruna-Fuji, along with a crater lake, Lake Haruna, along the western side. To the west of the lake is Mount Kamonga, the tallest of Mount Haruna's numerous peaks at 1,449 meters (4,754 ft) high.

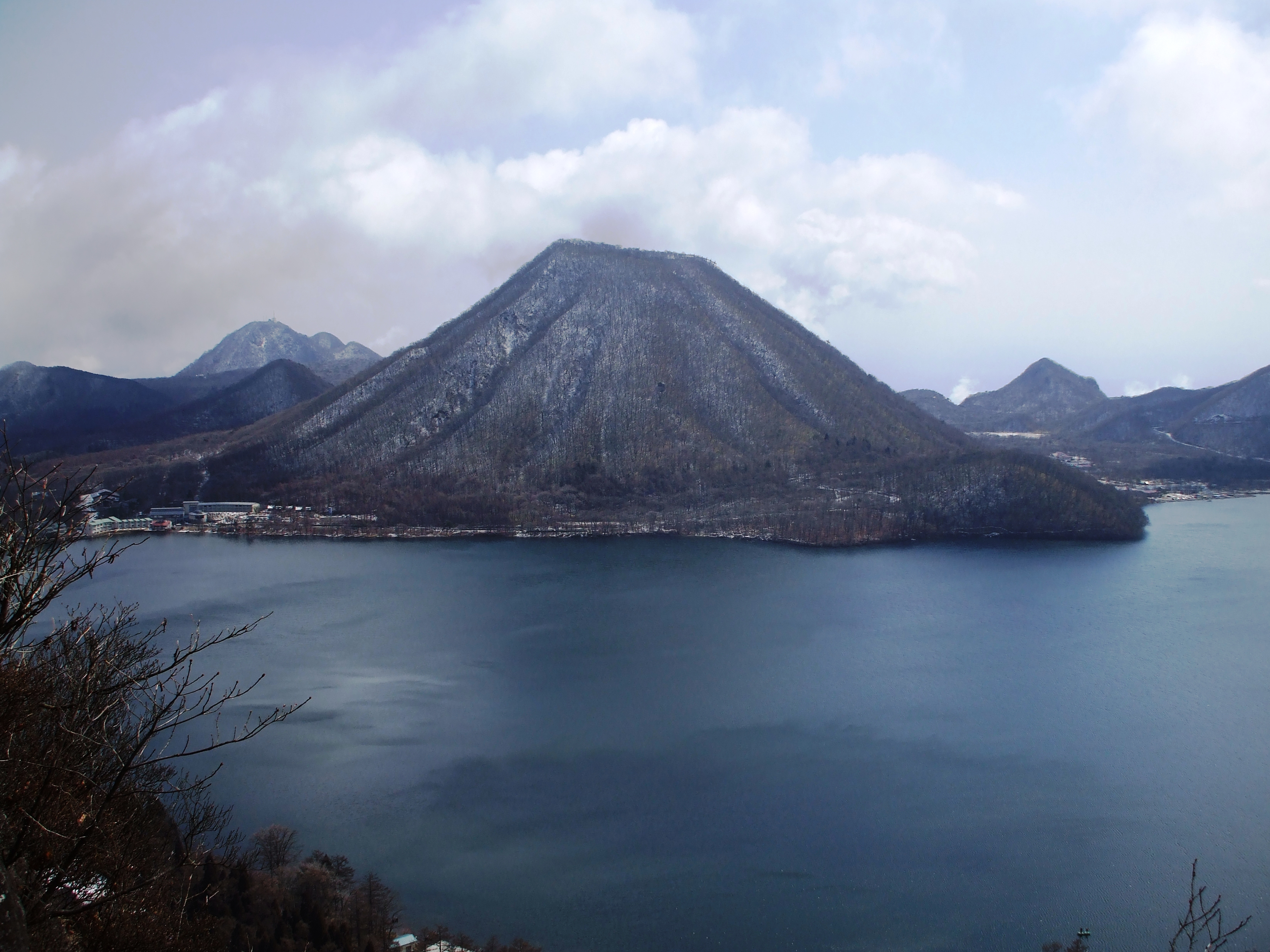
Inside of Haruna Caldera with Haruna-Fuji cinder cone and Lake Haruna.

The lake and the area to its east, as well as the southern and southwestern slopes, lie within the borders of Takasaki city. The border of Shibukawa city (to the east) nearly approaches Lake Haruna. Both Shinto village and Yoshioka town are on the southeast slopes of the mountain. The northern and northwestern slopes lie within Higashi Agatsuma town, which also bounds Lake Haruna. The summit lies on the border of Takasaki and Higashi Agatsuma.

Mount Haruna, along with Mount Akagi and Mount Myōgi, is one of the "Three Mountains of Jōmō." (Jōmō is an old name for Gunma.)

== In popular culture ==
The Japanese battlecruiser/Battleship Haruna was named after the Mount Haruna.

The mountain was made famous in the manga series Initial D under the fictional name Akina (秋名), where the main character, Takumi Fujiwara, delivers tofu every day to a hotel by the lake at the top of the hill, driving up and back down using his father's modified Toyota Sprinter Trueno (AE86). It is also where Takumi wins his first few races. It is the home course for the racing team called the Akina Speed Stars with which Takumi becomes closely associated. Later in the anime, Takumi, due to his unbeatable track records and for his downhill driving technique, is popularly referred to as 'Akina's 86'.

The mountain road is featured in the games Kaido Battle, Kaido Battle 2: Chain Reaction and Kaido Battle: Touge no Densetsu. A section of the road is featured in Forza Horizon 6. Courses inspired by the mountain are also featured in the games Race Driver: GRID and Blur.

== Gallery ==
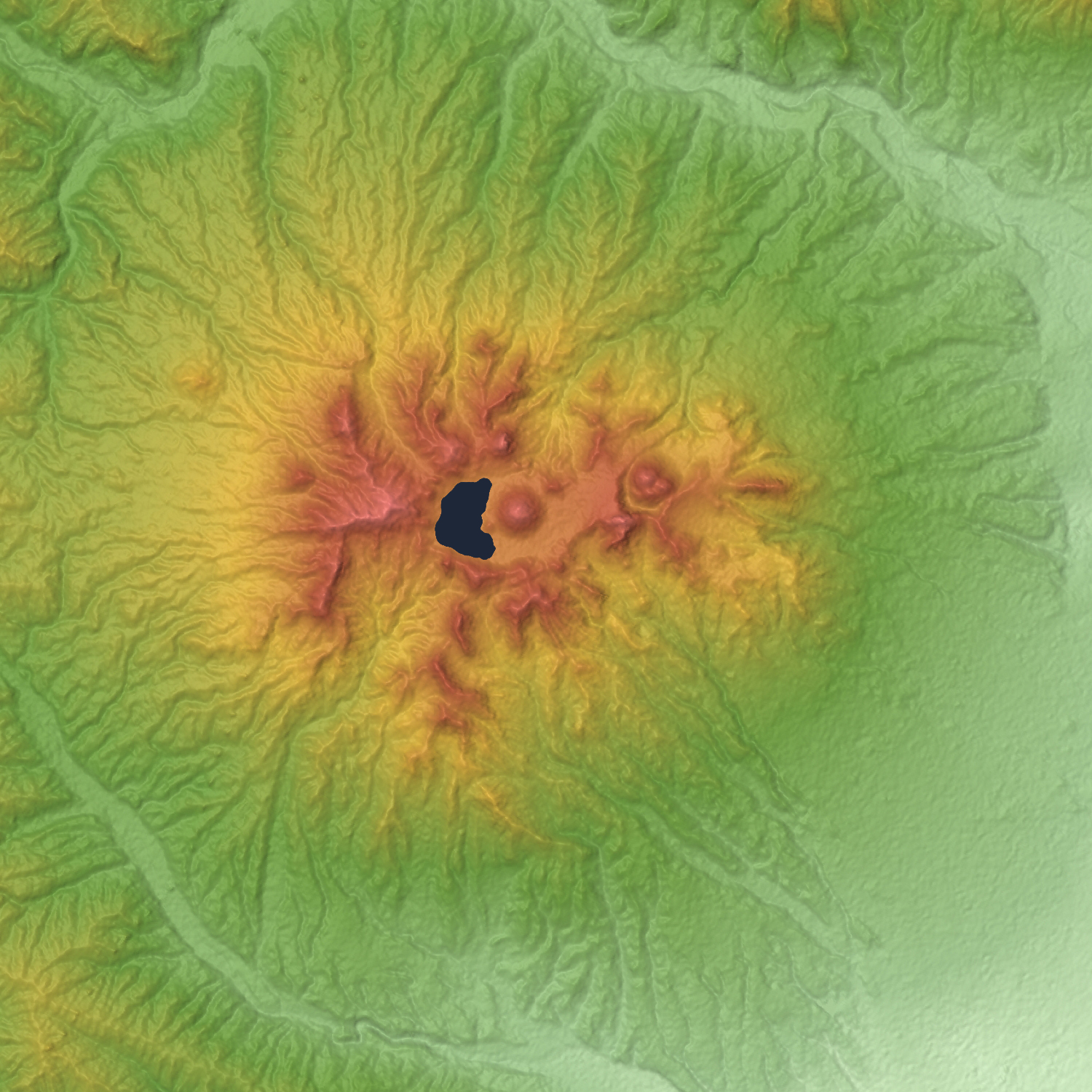
Relief Map

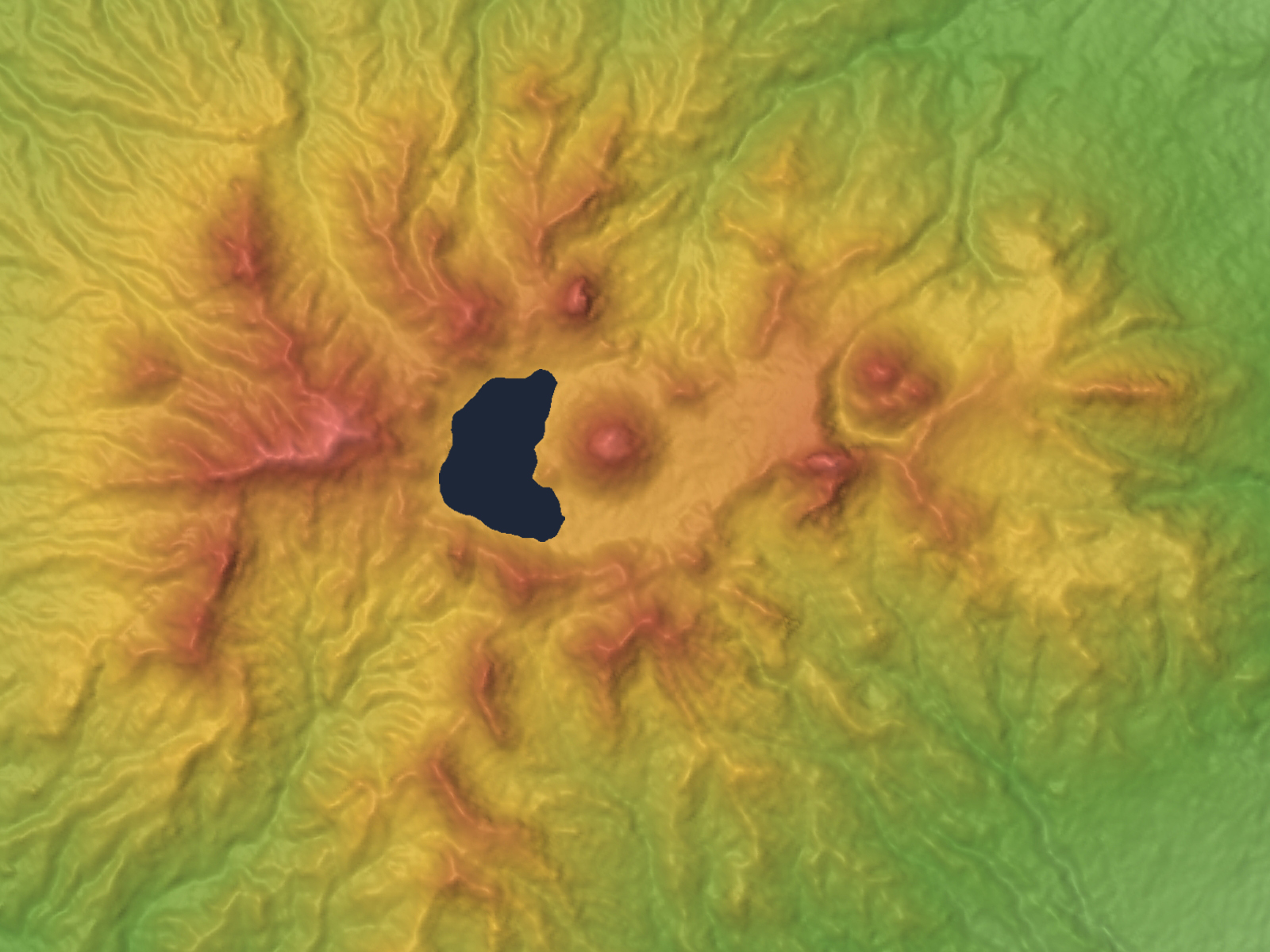
Mountaintop

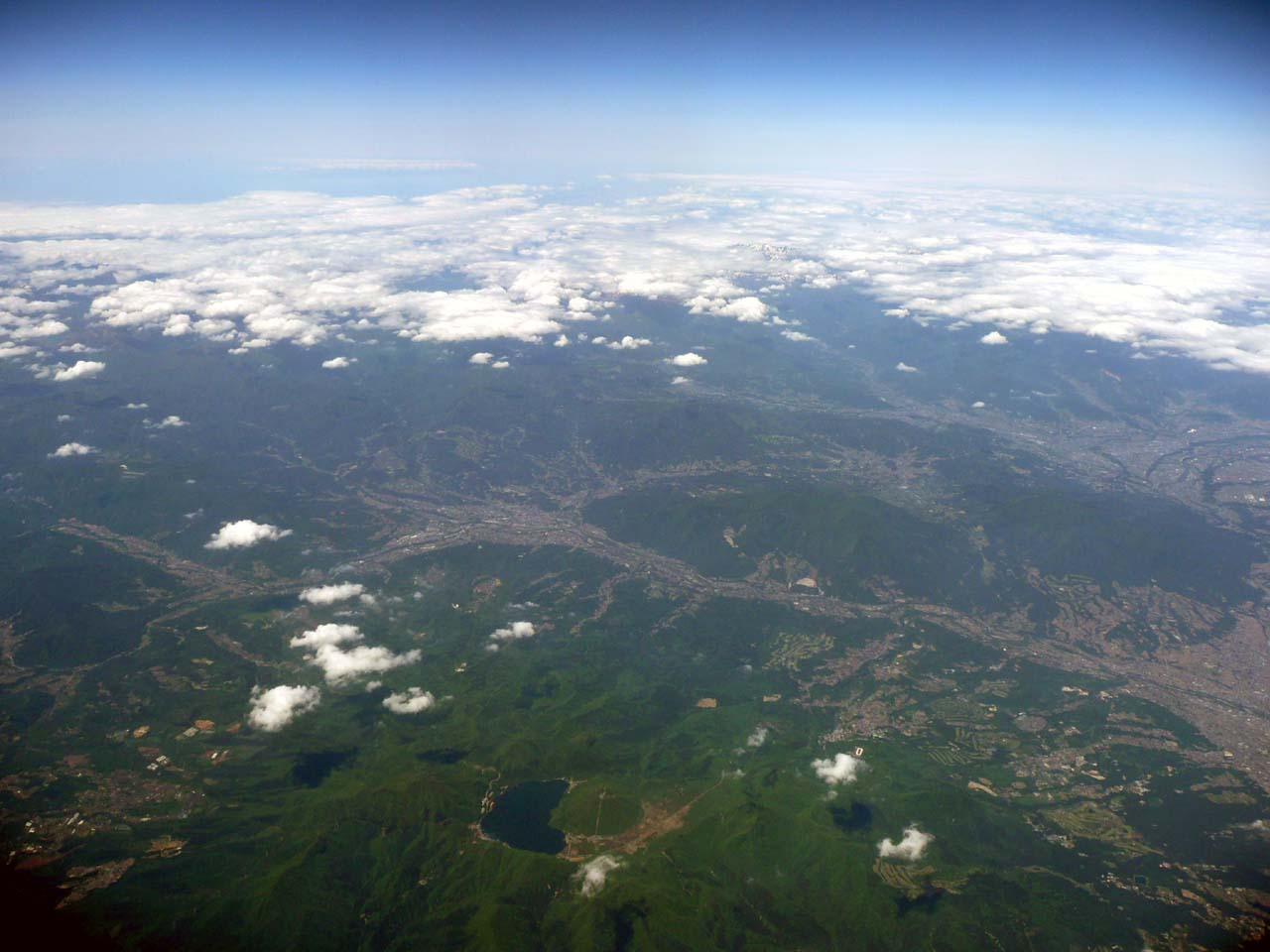
Haruna Volcano (Bottom) from the S.

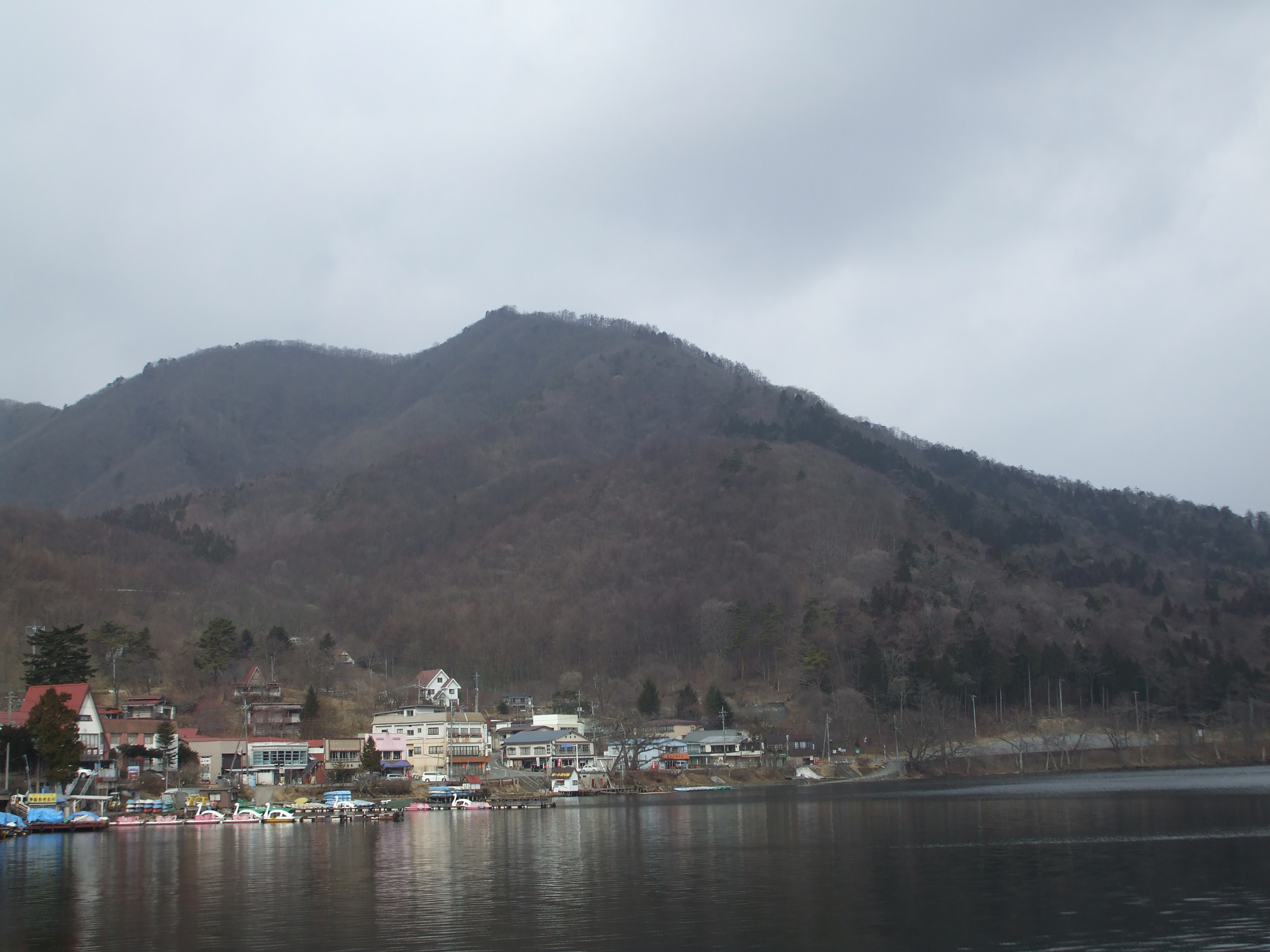
Mount Kamonga

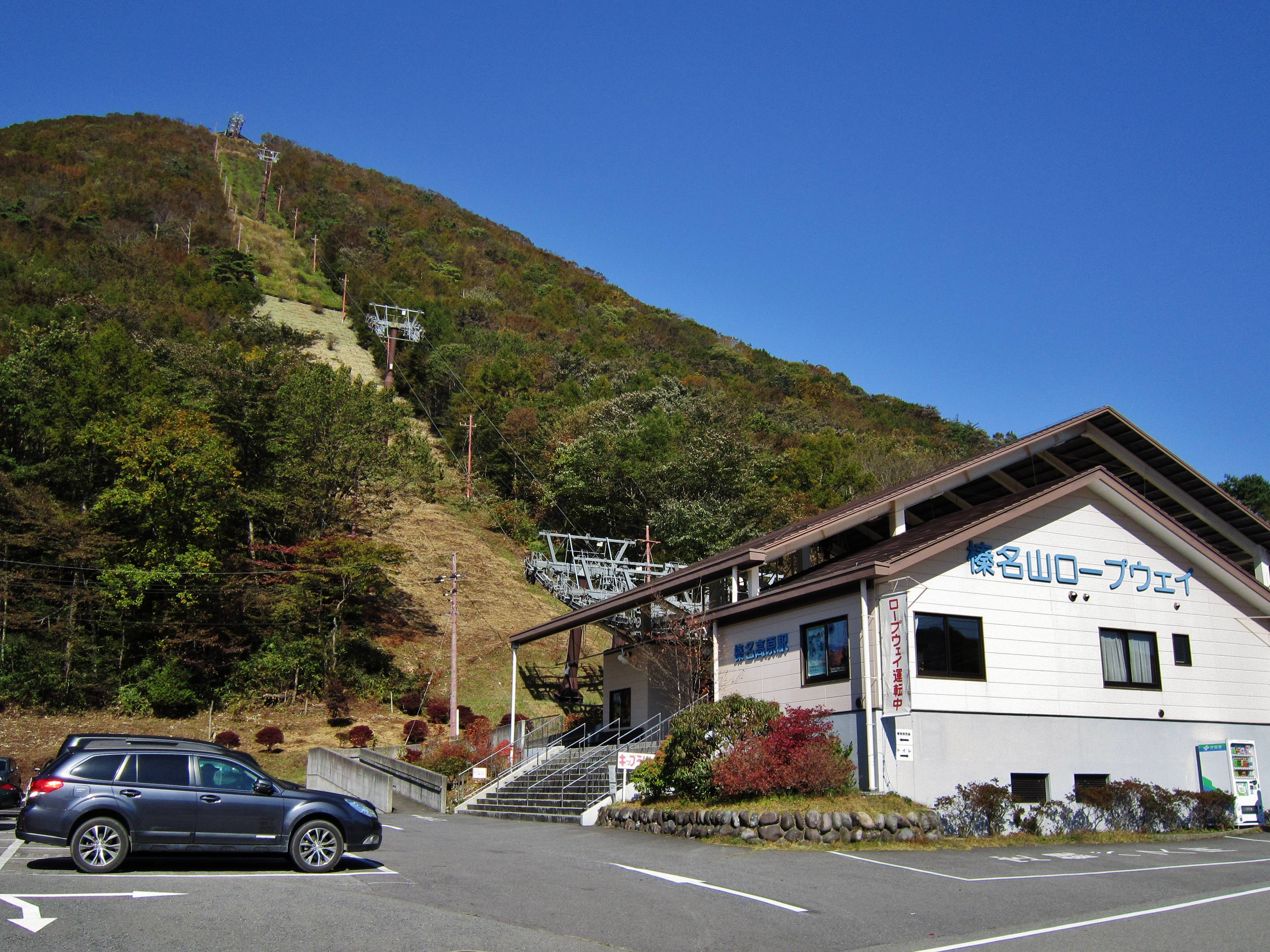
Harunasan Ropeway on Haruna-fuji Lava Dome

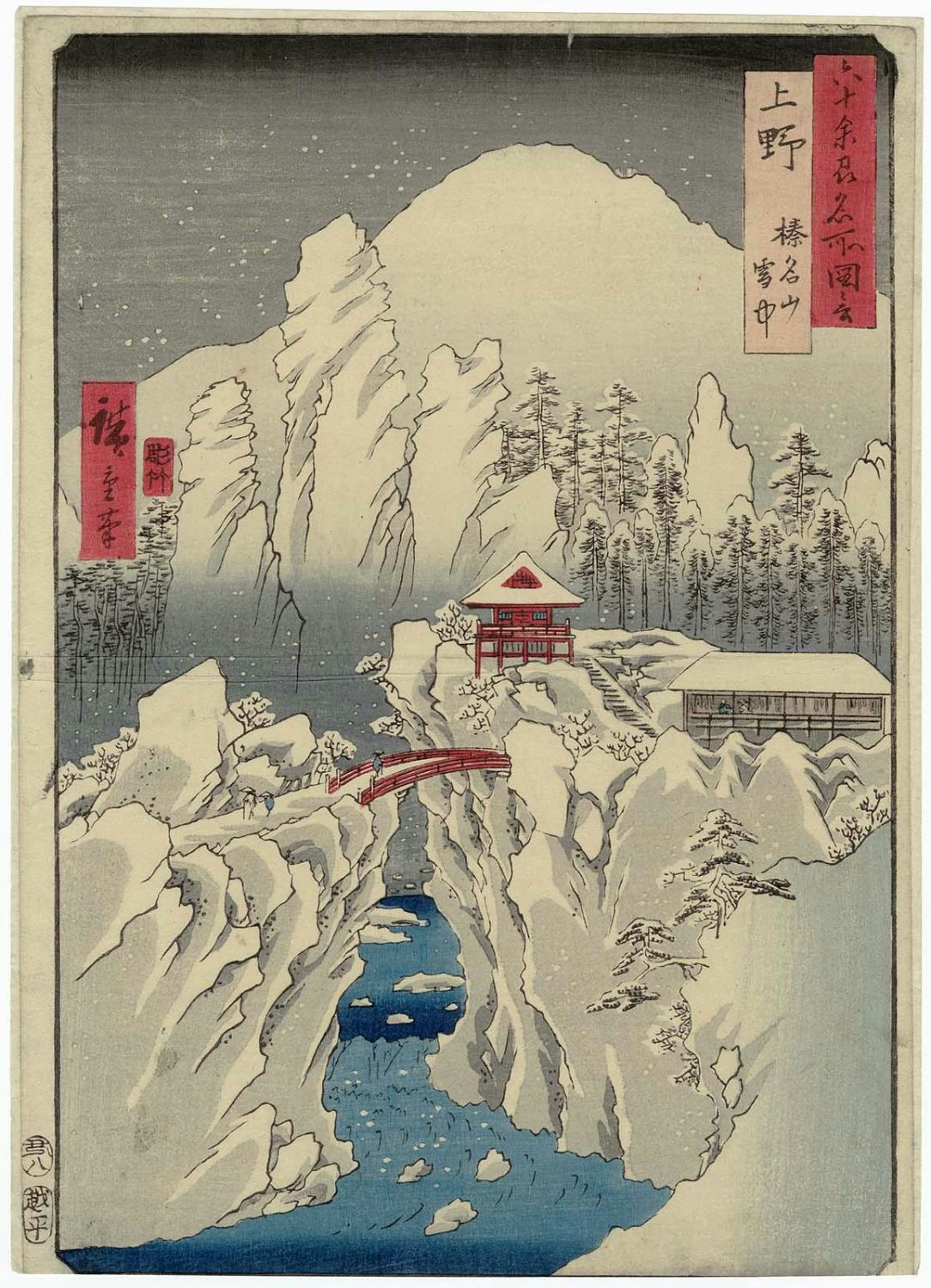
Hiroshige

== Climate ==
Climate data for Mount Haruna, 1991−2020 normals
Month	Jan	Feb	Mar	Apr	May	Jun	Jul	Aug	Sep	Oct	Nov	Dec	Year
Average precipitation mm (inches)	40.9 (1.61)	39.8 (1.57)	84.0 (3.31)	124.9 (4.92)	172.1 (6.78)	285.4 (11.24)	313.7 (12.35)	381.3 (15.01)	359.5 (14.15)	196.7 (7.74)	66.0 (2.60)	33.5 (1.32)	2,097.6 (82.58)
Average precipitation days (≥ 1.0 mm)	5.3	5.8	9.4	10.5	11.9	16.1	18.3	17.4	16.5	12.1	6.9	5.4	135.6
Source: Japan Meteorological Agency

== See also ==
- List of volcanoes in Japan
- The World War II-era battleship Haruna and the recently decommissioned JMSDF destroyer Haruna were named after the mountain.
- Haruna, Gunma
- Haruna Shrine
- Harunasan Ropeway
- Initial D
