= Takasaki Byakue Daikannon =

Kannon statue in Gunma Prefecture, Japan

- 高崎白衣大観音 (Japanese)
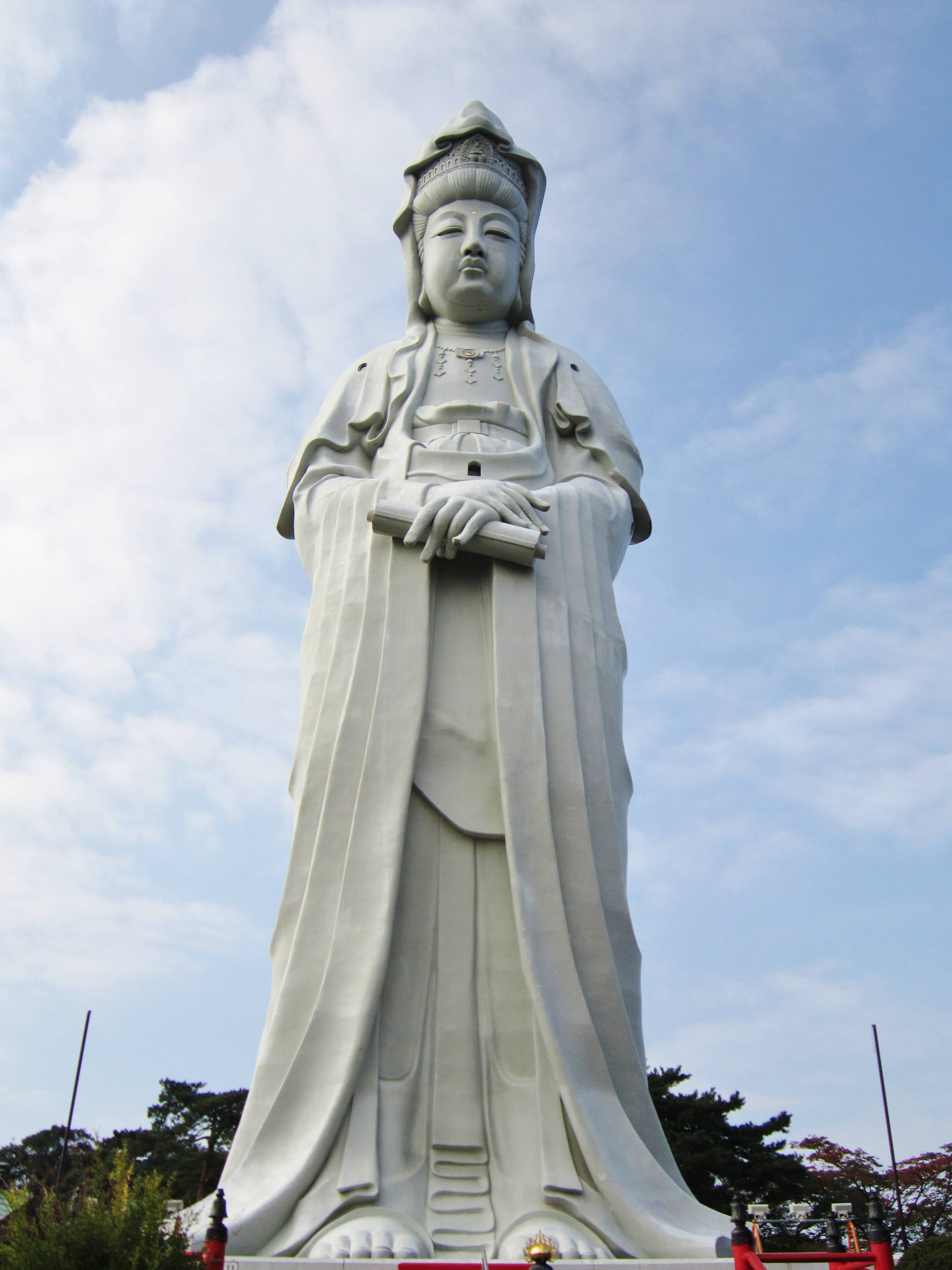
- Interactive map of Takasaki Byakue Daikannon
- 36.1839°N 138.5851°E
- Location: Mt. Kannonyama, Takasaki, Gunma Prefecture, Japan

History
- Founded: 1936

Site notes
- Height: 41.8 meters

The Takasaki Byakue Daikannon (高崎白衣大観音; lit. 'Giant Takasaki White-Robed Kannon') is a Kannon statue located on top of Mt. Kannonyama in Takasaki, Gunma Prefecture. It is also known colloquially as Kannonyama, and sometimes pronounced as Byakui as well. In Jomo Karuta, it is featured on the 'hi' card.

== Overview ==
Kannon is the Goddess of Mercy and originated in China, where she is called Guanyin. People come to Kannon to pray for protection from a variety of things such as natural disasters or for peace.

The Takasaki Byakue Daikannon is on top of Mt. Kannonyama and can be seen from some distance. The summit of Mt. Kannonyama stands at 190 meters tall; from the Kannon statue's shoulders (the highest point inside where people can climb to), one can see Takasaki City proper as well as all three of the famous mountains in Gunma. People can pay to enter inside it, where it is divided into nine floors. There are 20 Buddhas enshrined inside to view along the ascend.

== History ==
The Takasaki Byakue Daikannon was built in 1936 by Yasusaburo Inoue. It measures 41.8 meters tall, 48 meters around the waist, 0.4 meters around the thumb, and weighs around 6,000 tons in total. It was built as a memorial for fallen soldiers of the Imperial Japanese Army stationed in Takasaki with the intention of also turning Takasaki into a tourist spot, which the Takasaki Tourism Association began promoting in 1937. At that time, it was the tallest Kannon statue in Japan, but currently that record is held by the Sendai Daikannon. It is now the tenth largest in Japan.

== Attractions and Events ==
There used to be an amusement park called Kappapia nearby; after closing down in 2003, the site became what is current day Kannonyama Park. There are nature trails for walking as well as a dye botanical garden. Every Valentine's Day since 2011, a giant red string is tied to the Kannon statue's finger, and many couples come to pray for blessings and happiness in their relationships. In August, there is also a lantern festival that takes place at night. The area is a popular spot for viewing cherry blossoms in the spring.

== Notes ==
In the 1962 film King Kong vs Godzilla, a scene was filmed where Godzilla destroys the statue, but it was cut from the final film.
