= Takasaki =

Core city in Kantō, Japan

Takasaki 高崎市
- Core city
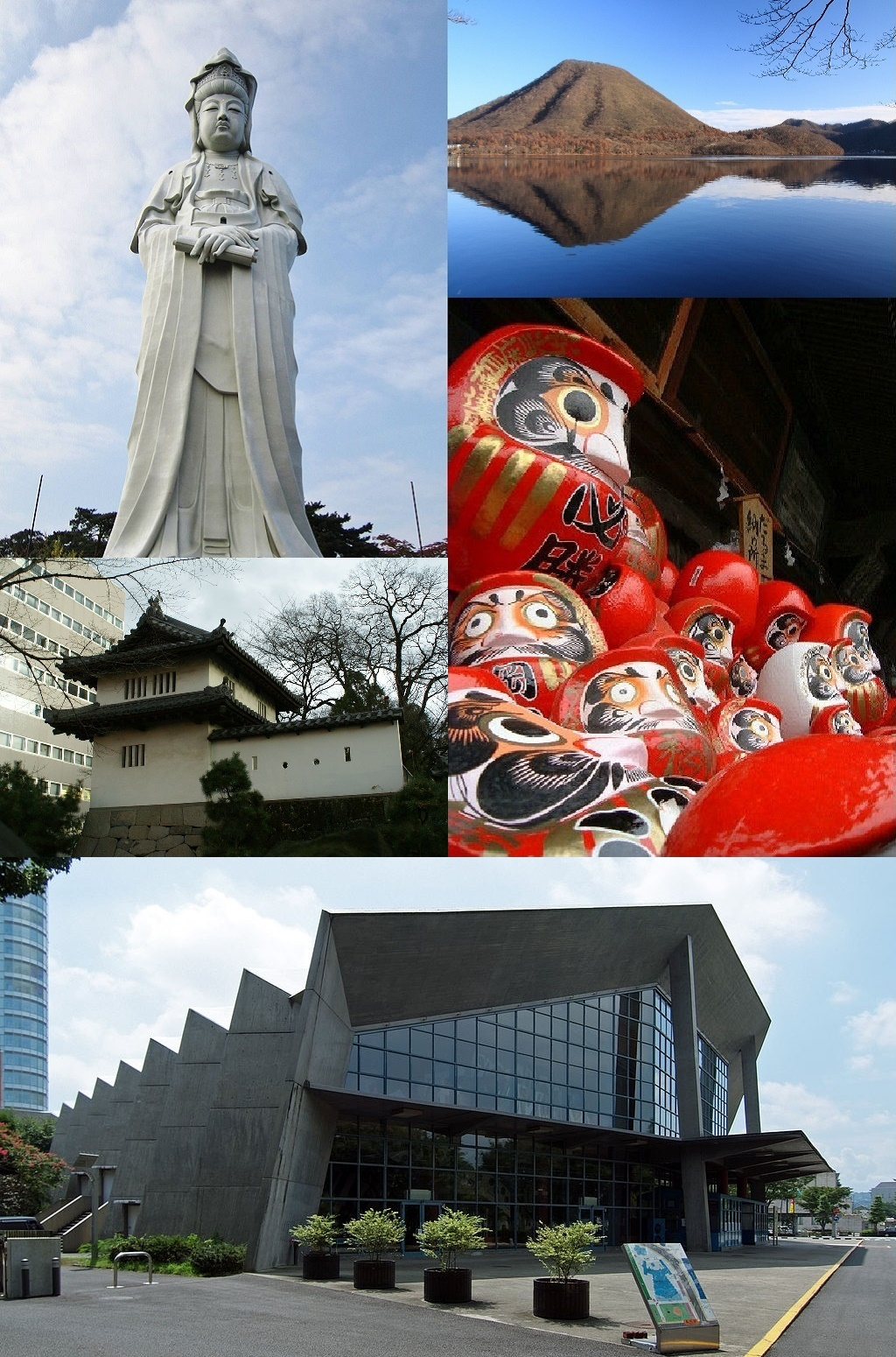
- Left: Takasaki Kannon Statue, Takasaki Castle, Gunma Music Center, Right: Mount Haruna and Lake Haruna, Takasaki Daruma Doll (all items from above to bottom)

- Flag Seal
- Location of Takasaki in Gunma Prefecture

- Coordinates: 36°19′18.8″N 139°0′11.8″E
- Country: Japan
- Region: Kantō
- Prefecture: Gunma
- First official recorded: late 5th century AD (official)
- City settled: April 1, 1900

Government
  - Mayor: Kenji Tomioka (since May 2011)

Area
  - Total: 459.16 km^{2} (177.28 sq mi)

Population (August 31, 2020)
  - Total: 372,369
  - Density: 810.98/km^{2} (2,100.4/sq mi)
- Time zone: UTC+9 (Japan Standard Time)
- Phone number: 027-321-111
- Address: Takamatsu-cho 35-1, Takasaki-shi, Gunma-ken 370-8501
- Climate: Cwa
- Website: Official website
- Symbols
- Bird: Japanese bush-warbler
- Flower: Sakura
- Tree: Zelkova serrata, Cyclobalanopsis

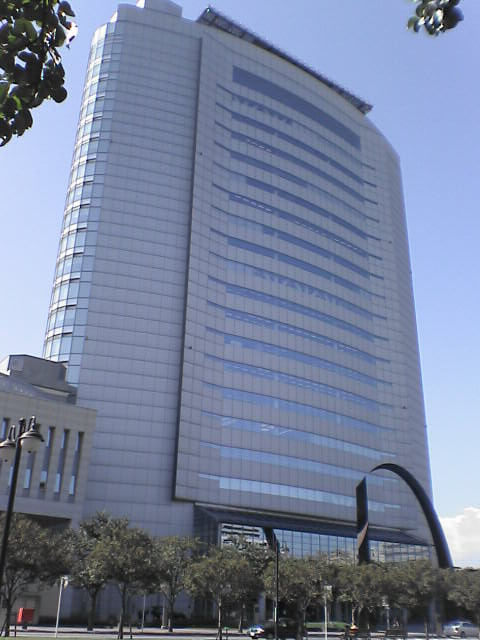
Takasaki City Hall

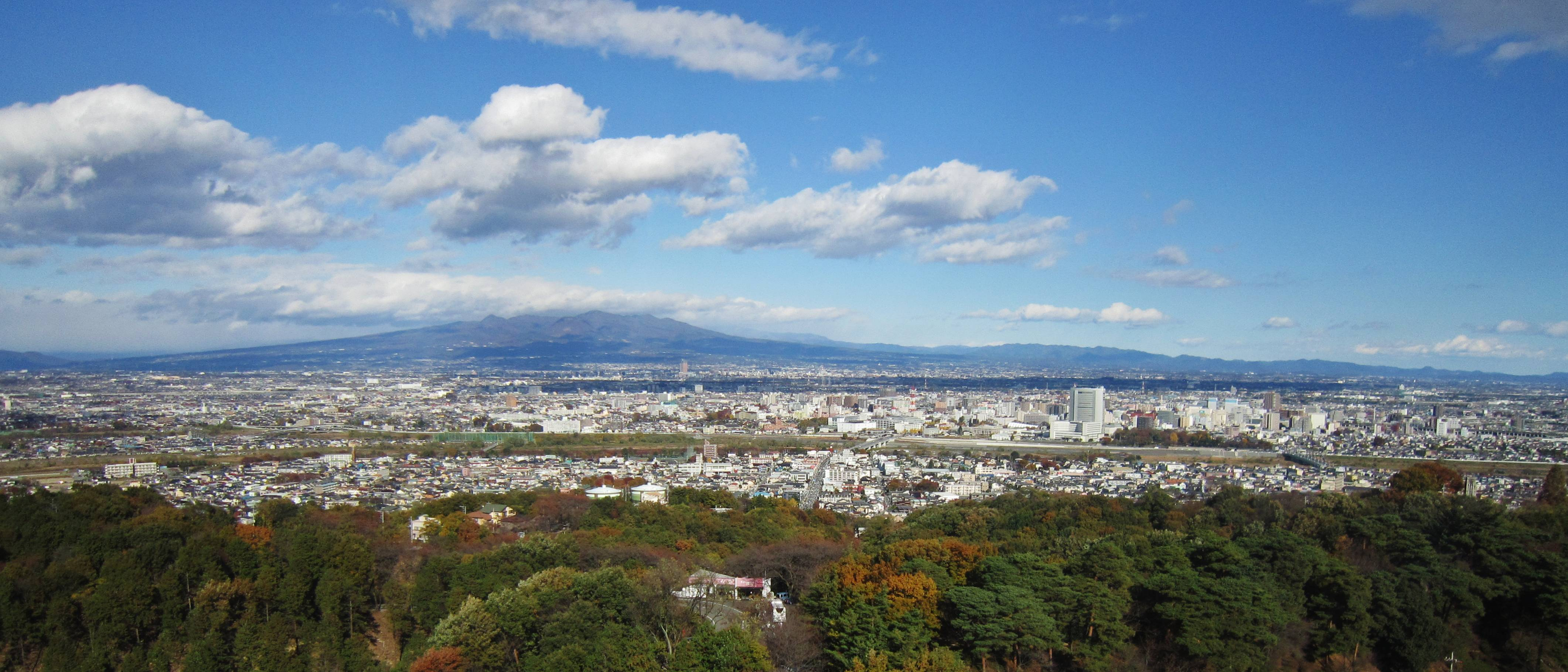
City view from Takasaki Kannon

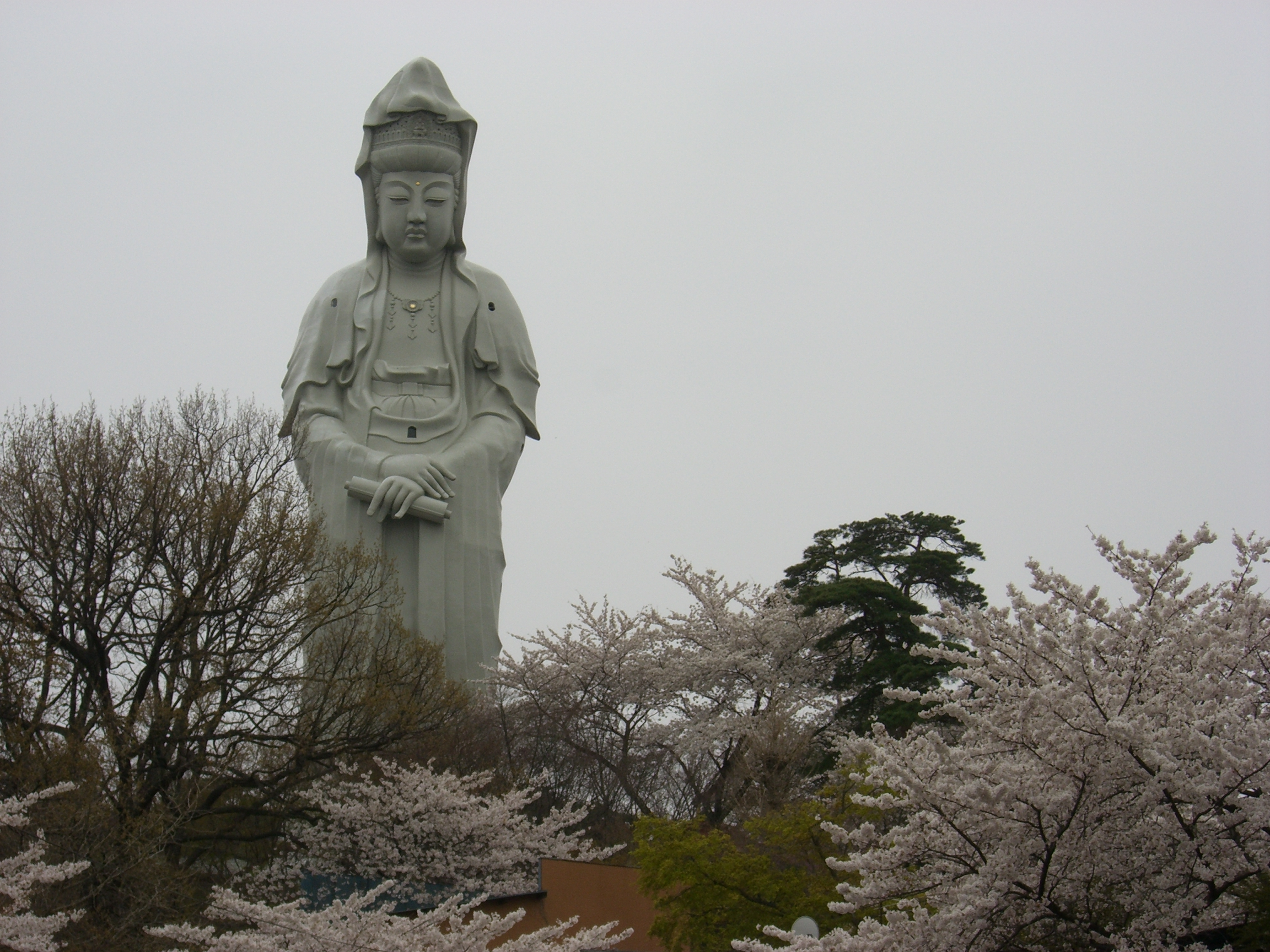
Takasaki Guanyin

Takasaki (高崎市, Takasaki-shi; [takasakiɕi]) is a city located in Gunma Prefecture, Japan. As of 31 August 2020, the city had an estimated population of 372,369 in 167,345 households, and a population density of 810 persons per km^{2}. The total area of the city is 459.16 square kilometres (177.28 sq mi). Takasaki is famous as the hometown of the Daruma doll, theoretically representing the Buddhist sage Bodhidharma and in modern practice a symbol of good luck. Takasaki has been the largest city in Gunma Prefecture since 1990 after overtaking Maebashi.

== Geography ==
Takasaki is located in the southwestern part of Gunma Prefecture in the flat northwestern part of the Kantō Plain. The city is located approximately 90 to 100 kilometers from central Tokyo. Mount Akagi, Mount Haruna and Mount Myogi can be seen from the city, and the southern slopes of Mount Haruna are within the city limits. The Tone River, Karasu River and Usui River flow through the city. Although Takasaki is located over 100 kilometers from the coast, much of the city is low-lying, and the elevation of the city hall and central city area is only 97 meters above sea level. The land rises to the northern and western parts of the city to a maximum elevation of 1690 meters.

=== Surrounding municipalities ===
Gunma Prefecture

- Annaka
- Fujioka
- Higashiagatsuma
- Kanra
- Maebashi
- Naganohara
- Shibukawa
- Shintō
- Tamamura

Nagano Prefecture

- Karuizawa

Saitama Prefecture

- Kamisato

=== Climate ===
Takasaki has a humid subtropical climate (Köppen Cwa) characterized by warm summers and cold, windy winters (karakkaze) with occasional snowfall. The average annual temperature in Takasaki is 14.0 °C (57.2 °F). The average annual rainfall is 1,354.9 mm (53.34 in), with September as the wettest month. The temperatures are highest on average in August, at around 25.8 °C (78.4 °F), and lowest in January, at around 2.6 °C (36.7 °F).

Climate data for Kamisatomi, Takasaki (1991−2020 normals, extremes 1977−present)
Month	Jan	Feb	Mar	Apr	May	Jun	Jul	Aug	Sep	Oct	Nov	Dec	Year
Record high °C (°F)	20.1 (68.2)	25.7 (78.3)	27.9 (82.2)	32.0 (89.6)	35.6 (96.1)	39.0 (102.2)	40.3 (104.5)	38.9 (102.0)	38.8 (101.8)	32.1 (89.8)	26.4 (79.5)	24.0 (75.2)	40.3 (104.5)
Mean daily maximum °C (°F)	9.3 (48.7)	10.2 (50.4)	13.8 (56.8)	19.2 (66.6)	24.0 (75.2)	26.5 (79.7)	30.0 (86.0)	31.2 (88.2)	27.0 (80.6)	21.7 (71.1)	16.5 (61.7)	11.6 (52.9)	20.1 (68.2)
Daily mean °C (°F)	2.6 (36.7)	3.5 (38.3)	7.0 (44.6)	12.6 (54.7)	17.6 (63.7)	21.2 (70.2)	24.9 (76.8)	25.8 (78.4)	21.8 (71.2)	16.0 (60.8)	10.0 (50.0)	4.9 (40.8)	14.0 (57.2)
Mean daily minimum °C (°F)	−2.8 (27.0)	−2.2 (28.0)	0.9 (33.6)	6.3 (43.3)	11.8 (53.2)	16.7 (62.1)	20.8 (69.4)	21.7 (71.1)	17.9 (64.2)	11.5 (52.7)	4.9 (40.8)	−0.4 (31.3)	8.9 (48.1)
Record low °C (°F)	−9.0 (15.8)	−9.3 (15.3)	−7.1 (19.2)	−3.4 (25.9)	0.9 (33.6)	6.8 (44.2)	13.8 (56.8)	12.9 (55.2)	7.0 (44.6)	1.0 (33.8)	−2.9 (26.8)	−7.6 (18.3)	−9.3 (15.3)
Average precipitation mm (inches)	29.1 (1.15)	26.8 (1.06)	61.0 (2.40)	78.9 (3.11)	112.2 (4.42)	173.1 (6.81)	221.4 (8.72)	221.6 (8.72)	214.2 (8.43)	147.7 (5.81)	45.4 (1.79)	23.6 (0.93)	1,354.9 (53.34)
Average precipitation days (≥ 1.0 mm)	3.5	4.1	8.0	8.8	10.4	14.2	16.0	14.4	13.2	10.1	5.8	3.9	112.4
Mean monthly sunshine hours	208.1	200.3	207.6	206.4	202.7	140.7	154.2	178.3	137.4	154.4	179.4	193.6	2,163.1
Source 1: Japan Meteorological Agency
Source 2: 理科年表

== Demographics ==
Per Japanese census data, the population of Takasaki has recently plateaued after a long period of growth.

Historical population
Year	Pop.	±%
1960	244,376	—
1970	280,625	+14.8%
1980	323,403	+15.2%
1990	346,933	+7.3%
2000	358,465	+3.3%
2010	371,302	+3.6%
2020	372,973	+0.5%

== History ==
During the Edo period, the area of present-day Takasaki was the center of the Takasaki Domain, a feudal domain held by a branch of the Matsudaira clan under the Tokugawa shogunate in Kōzuke Province. The area also prospered from its location on the Nakasendō highway connecting Edo with Kyoto. Post stations located within the borders of modern Takasaki were: Shinmachi-shuku, Kuragano-shuku, and Takasaki-shuku. Following the Meiji Restoration, Takasaki was briefly capital of Gunma Prefecture, before the capital was moved to Maebashi in 1881.

Takasaki Town was created within Gunma District, Gunma on April 1, 1889 with the creation of the modern municipalities system. It was raised to city status on April 1, 1900. On April 1, 1927, Takasaki annexed the neighboring villages of Tsukasawa and Kataoka, followed by Sano on October 1, 1937. The city largely escaped damage in World War II. Following the war, it continued to expand its borders by annexing the village of Rokugo on April 1, 1951, Shintakao and Nakamura as well as Yawata and Toyooka from Ushi District on January 20, 1955. This was followed by Orui village and Sano village from Tano District on September 30, 1956. The city celebrated its 360th anniversary in 1963 and annexed the town of Kuragano on March 31 of the same year. On September 1, 1965 the village of Gunnan was annexed.

In September 1987, five-year-old Yoshiaki Ogiwara, the son of a local firefighter, was abducted and subsequently murdered in Takasaki. The murder received heavy media coverage across Japan.

On April 1, 2001 Takasaki was proclaimed a Special City (Tokurei-shi), which gave it greater autonomy.

On January 23, 2006, the towns of Gunma, Kurabuchi and Misato (all from Gunma District), and the town of Shinmachi (from Tano District) were merged into Takasaki. On October 1, 2006, the town of Haruna (from Gunma District) was merged into the expanded city of Takasaki. Gunma District was dissolved as a result of this merger. On June 1, 2009, the town of Yoshii (from Tano District) was merged into expanded city of Takasaki.

Takasaki was elevated to a Core city with even greater autonomy on April 1, 2011.

== Government ==
Takasaki has a mayor-council form of government with a directly elected mayor and a unicameral city council of 38 members. Takasaki contributes nine members to the Gunma Prefectural Assembly. In terms of national politics, the city is divided between the Gunma 4th district and Gunma 5th district of the lower house of the Diet of Japan.

== Successive mayors ==
Period	Mayor	Term start	Term end
1	Hachirō Yajima	July 18, 1900	July 16, 1906
2	Ubuzawa Ichitarō	July 20, 1906	October 9, 1908
3-4	Nobuyasu Uchida	November 5, 1908	November 4, 1918
5	Shūtarō Furuki	February 3, 1919	July 22, 1921
6	Zenji Tsuchiya	September 1, 1921	August 31, 1925
7	Tōru Aoki	January 9, 1926	January 8, 1930
8	Tetsukichirō Kanayama	March 3, 1930	April 26, 1930
9	Saksaburō Sekine	May 10, 1930	August 21, 1932
10	Ichizō Yamaura	August 29, 1932	August 28, 1936
11-13	Munetarō Kubota	September 11, 1936	November 15, 1946
14-15	Hirokazu Kojima	April 10, 1947	May 1, 1955
16-19	Keizaburō Sumitani	May 2, 1955	May 1, 1971
20-23	Kenji Numaga	May 2, 1971	May 1, 1987
24-29	Yukio Matsuura	May 2, 1987	May 1, 2011
30-33	Kenji Tomioka	May 2, 2011	ongoing

Source:Takasaki City

== Economy ==
Takasaki is a regional commercial center and transportation hub, and is a major industrial center within Gunma Prefecture. Companies headquartered in Takasaki include CUSCO Japan, an automotive parts manufacturer, and Yamada Denki, a home appliance retailer.

== Education ==
=== Universities and colleges ===
- Gumma Paz College
- Ikuei Junior College
- Jobu University
- Niijima Gakuen Junior College
- Takasaki City University of Economics
- Takasaki University of Commerce
- Takasaki University of Commerce Junior College
- Takasaki University of Health and Welfare
- Takasaki University of Health and Welfare Junior College

== Primary and secondary education ==
Takasaki has over sixty public elementary schools and 25 public middle schools operated by the city government and eight public high schools operated by the Gunma Prefecture Board of Education. In addition, the city operates one public high school and there are five private high schools. The prefecture also operates five special education schools for the handicapped.

=== English education ===
Takasaki developed its own unique English curriculum and implemented it at all of the primary and middle schools in the city. Primary school students in 1st through 4th grades have English lessons (formally called 'foreign language activities') once a week, while 5th and 6th grades have proper English lessons twice a week. This totals 35 hours (only 34 for 1st grade) of English education for 1st through 4th graders and 70 hours for 5th and 6th graders.

The main emphasis on primary school English in Takasaki is communication; students are actively encouraged to listen to authentic English and express themselves to their peers. In order to achieve this, Mayor Tomioka pushed to increase the number of Assistant Language Teachers in the city. Commonly referred to as ALTs, they are native English speakers hired from abroad to come and assist Japanese teachers during English class. Takasaki employs many ALTs through The JET Program. Prior to the COVID-19 pandemic, Takasaki had at least 1 ALT assigned to every primary and middle school in the city. The Takasaki Board of Education claims that Takasaki was the first in all of Japan to have English lessons starting in 1st grade, to have English twice a week for older students, and to assign at least 1 ALT to every school.

In 2014, the Ministry of Education, Culture, Sports, Science and Technology (also abbreviated as MEXT) acknowledged the need to increase students' English ability in order to succeed globally. In 2016, MEXT then designated Takasaki as a pilot city to test out upcoming changes to the nationwide English curriculum; the changes were modeled after the existing Takasaki curriculum. It was decided that the changes would officially begin in stages; primary schools would adapt the new curriculum nationwide in 2020, middle schools in 2021, and secondary schools in 2022.

In 2019, MEXT did a survey to see how both primary and middle school students were performing in all subjects at the prefectural level. It was found that students in Gunma Prefecture placed in the top 6 prefectures across all subjects, and for the first time tied with Tokyo for first place in English.

== Transportation ==
=== Railway ===
JR East – Hokuriku Shinkansen JR East – Jōetsu Shinkansen

- Takasaki

JR East – Takasaki Line, Shōnan-Shinjuku Line, Ueno-Tokyo Line

- Shimmachi - Kuragano - Takasaki

JR East – Jōetsu Line

- Takasaki - Takasakitonyamachi - Ino

JR East – Shinetsu Main Line

- Takasaki - Kita-Takasaki - Gumma-Yawata

Jōshin Dentetsu

- Takasaki - Minami-Takasaki - Sanonowatashi - Negoya - Takasaki-Shōka-Daigakumae - Yamana - Nishi-Yamana - Maniwa - Yoshii - Nishi-Yoshii

=== Highway ===
- Kan-etsu Expressway – Takasaki-Tamamura Smart Interchange – Takasaki Junction – Takasaki Interchange – Maebashi Interchange
- Jōshin-etsu Expressway – Yoshii Interchange
- Kita-Kantō Expressway – Takasaki Junction
- National Route 17
- National Route 18
- National Route 254
- National Route 354
- National Route 406

== Local attractions ==
- Haruna Shrine
- Lake Haruna
- Minowa Castle
- Mount Haruna
- The Museum of Modern Art, Gunma
- Shorinzan Daruma Temple
- The sound of a suikinkutsu in the Suikintei Garden of former Yoshii town is designated as one of the 100 Soundscapes of Japan by the Ministry of the Environment
- Takasaki Byakue Dai-Kannon, the 10th largest Kannon statue in Japan
- Takasaki Castle

=== Events ===
- Kannonyama Candle Festival
- Takasaki Festival & Fireworks
- Takasaki Film Festival
- Takasaki Marching Festival

==== King of Pasta ====
Gunma is one of the leading producers of wheat in all of Japan. As such, dishes that utilize wheat flour play in important role in local food culture. Takasaki is said to have many pasta shops per capita and in recent years has been called the pasta town. Since 2009, Takasaki has held an annual competition called King of Pasta; citizens can buy mini portions of pasta dishes from participating restaurants and vote for the best one.

== Sport ==
- Arte Takasaki - football (soccer) club

== Sister cities ==
Takasaki is twinned with:

- Battle Creek, Michigan, United States, since 1981
- Muntinlupa, Metro Manila, Philippines, since 2006
- Plzeň, Czech Republic, since 1990
- Santo André, São Paulo, Brazil, since 1981

=== Friendship cities ===
- Chengde, Hebei, China, since 1987
- Kanazawa, Ishikawa, Japan, since 2008

== Notable people ==
- Takeo Fukuda, former Prime Minister of Japan
- Yasuo Fukuda, former Prime Minister of Japan
- Yutaka Higuchi, musician (Buck-Tick)
- Kyosuke Himuro, musician (Boøwy)
- Tomoyasu Hotei, musician (Boøwy)
- Fujio Masuoka, inventor of flash memory
- Kanai Mieko (born in Takasaki 1947), writer
- Hirofumi Nakasone, politician
- Yasuhiro Nakasone, former Prime Minister of Japan
- Kiyoshi Ogawa, Imperial Japanese Navy kamikaze pilot
- Hakubun Shimomura, politician
- Bruno Taut, German architect who lived for some time in Takasaki
- Kenji Tsukagoshi, navigator and aviator
- Toll Yagami, musician (Buck-Tick)

Singaporean actress Jeanette Aw became an official PR ambassador for the city after starring in Ramen Teh, which was set and filmed in Takasaki. Ramen chef Fuku Amagawa trained in Takasaki.
