= Haruna Shrine =

Shinto shrine in Gunma Prefecture, Japan

Haruna Shrine 榛名神社
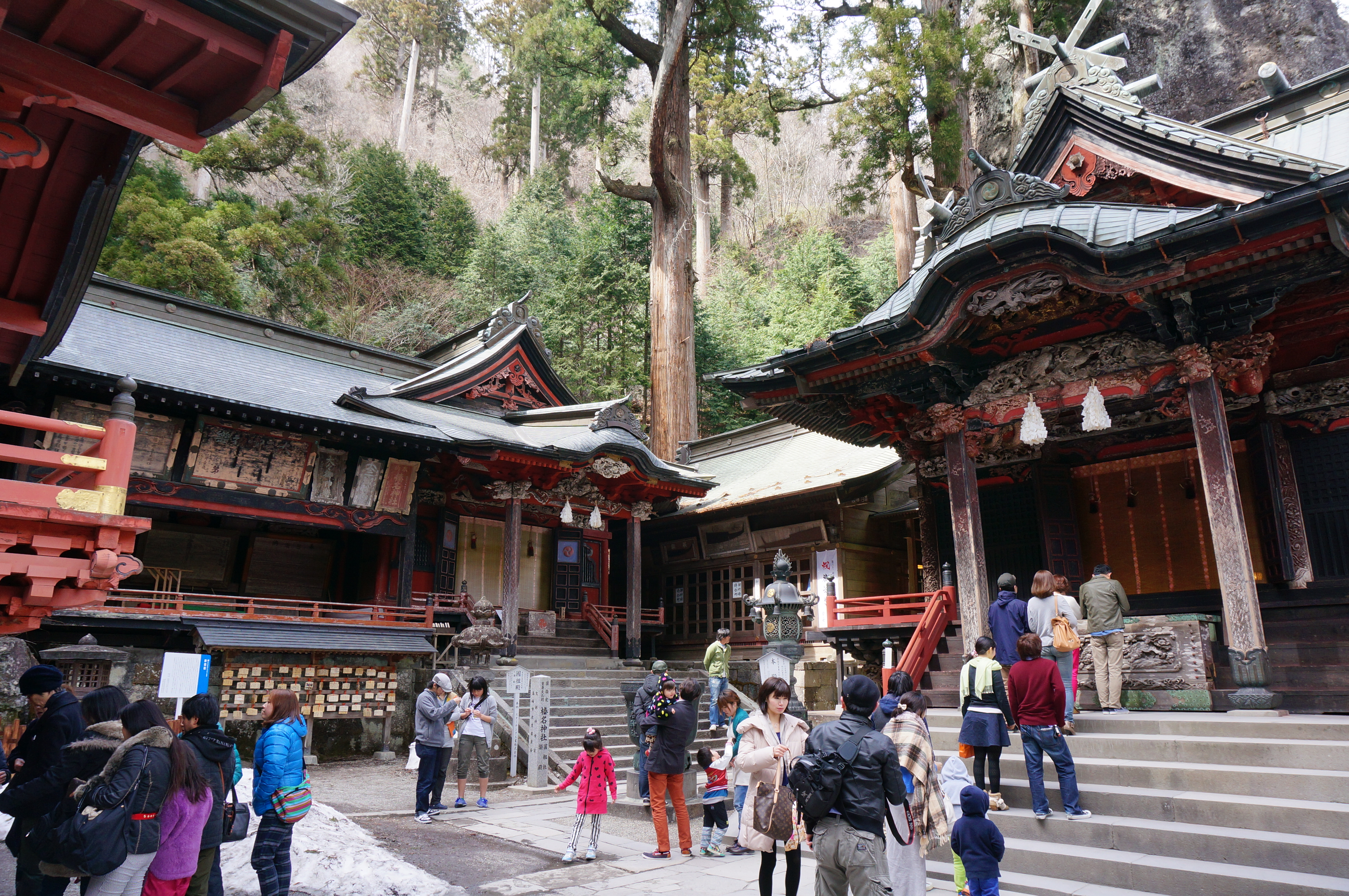
- Honden of Haruna Jinja

- Location within Japan

Religion
- Affiliation: Shinto

Location
- Location: 849 Harunasan-cho, Takasaki; Gunma 〒370-3341
- Interactive map of Haruna Shrine 榛名神社
- Coordinates: 36°27′30.57″N 138°51′08″E

Architecture
- Established: 586

Website
- www.haruna.or.jp

Haruna Shrine (榛名神社, Haruna Jinja) is a Shinto shrine located in Takasaki, Gunma Prefecture, Japan. Mount Haruna, the mountain where the shrine is located, is one of the "Three Mountains of Jōmō" and the shrine has a close relationship with the shrines of the other two mountains, Mount Akagi and Mount Myōgi. It is dedicated to the gods of Water, Fire, and Agriculture. It also said to give blessings of prosperity in business and a good marriage.

== History ==
Haruna Shrine was founded in 586, the first year of the reign of Emperor Yōmei. During the 14th century it became affiliated with Ueno's Kan'ei-ji. During the Meiji era separation of Buddhism and Shinto, the Buddhist colors were discontinued and the original Haruna Shrine was restored.
