= Lake Haruna =

Caldera lake in Japan

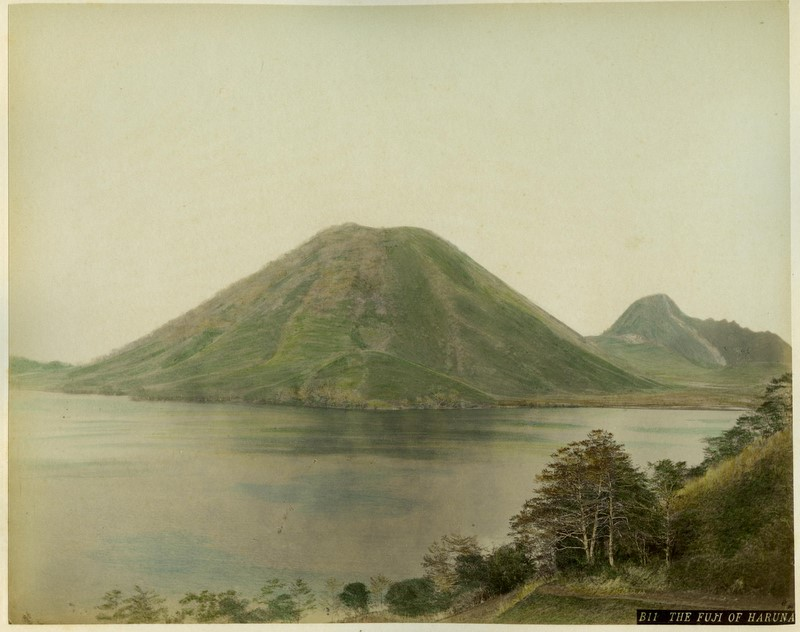
- The Fuji of Haruna; Adolfo Farsari

- Location within Japan
- Location: Takasaki, Gunma
- Coordinates: 36°28′30″N 138°52′0″E
- Type: caldera
- Basin countries: Japan
- Surface area: 1.15 km^{2} (0.44 sq mi)
- Max. depth: 12.6 m (41 ft)
- Shore length^{1}: 6 km (3.7 mi)
- Surface elevation: 1,084 m (3,556 ft)
- ^{1} Shore length is not a well-defined measure.

Lake Haruna (榛名湖, Haruna-ko) is a caldera lake. It lies near the summit of Mount Haruna, within the city limits of Takasaki, Gunma Prefecture, Japan. A former name for the lake is Lake Ikaho (伊香保沼, Ikaho-numa).

In the summer, the lake is a popular destination for campers. The surface freezes in the winter, and it affords skating and ice fishing for wakasagi.

The lake lies a 90-minute bus ride from Takasaki Station. It can be reached in 40 minutes by car from Shibukawa-Ikaho Interchange, #12 on the Kan-Etsu Expressway. The road to the lake is one of 10 musical roads located in Gunma prefecture alone; the song played is "Sweetly Sings the Donkey," chosen because the melody is known as "At a Quiet Lakeside" in Japan.

A kayōkyoku refers to the lake in its title. Akira Fuse recorded the tune, named Haruna-ko no shōjo. The music is by Rei Nakanishi and the lyrics by Ken'ichirō Morioka.

Parts of the anime and manga Initial D take place on or around the lake, under the fictional name Lake Akina, as Mount Haruna - named Akina (秋名) in the series - is the location of the tōge where Takumi, the protagonist, wins his first races.

== Sources ==
This article incorporates material from the article 榛名湖 (Harunako) in the Japanese Wikipedia, retrieved on March 21, 2008.
