= Takasaki University of Commerce =

Coordinates: 36°17′8.3″N 139°2′2.8″E

- 高崎商科大学
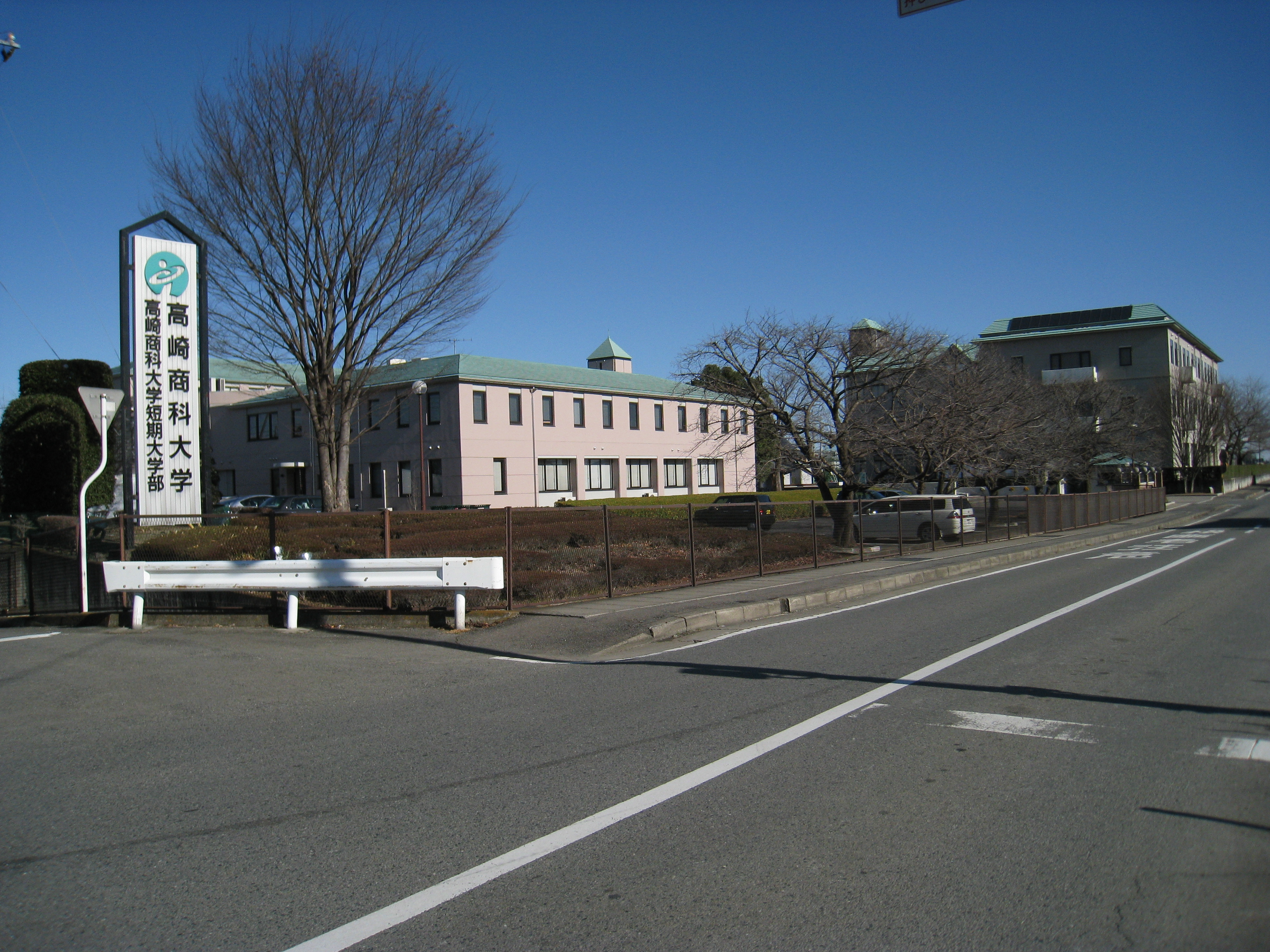
- Type: Private
- Established: Founded 1906; Chartered 2001
- Location: Takasaki, Gunma, Japan
- Website: Official website

Takasaki University of Commerce (高崎商科大学, Takasaki shōka daigaku) is a private university in Takasaki, Gunma, Japan, established in 2001. The predecessor of the school was founded in 1906.
