= List of current and historical women's universities and colleges in Japan =

The following is a list of current and historical women's universities and colleges in Japan. A women's college is an institution of higher education where enrollment is all-female. Most of these are private universities; a few are funded by the prefectural governments; the only two funded by the national government are Nara and Ochanomizu.

Where institutions have become coeducational, this is noted, along with the year the enrollment policy was changed. Current (as of 2007) women's colleges are listed in bold text. Colleges that are closing or transitioning to coeducation are listed in italics.

As of 2025 there are 66 women's universities and colleges in the country, a decline by about 33% from 1998.

== Aichi ==
- Aichi Prefectural University, Nagakute (co-ed since 1966)
- Aichi Gakusen University, Okazaki (co-ed since 1987)
- Chukyo Women's University, Obu (co-ed since 1998)
- **Kinjo Gakuin University**, Nagoya - Will become coeducational in April 2029
- **Nagoya Women's University**, Nagoya
- **Ohkagakuen University**, Toyota
- **Sugiyama Jogakuen University**, Nagoya

== Ehime ==
- **Matsuyama Shinonome College**, Matsuyama

== Fukushima ==
- **Koriyama Women's University** Koriyama, Fukushima

== Fukuoka ==
- **Chikushi Jogakuen University**, Dazaifu
- **Fukuoka Jo Gakuin University**, Fukuoka
- **Fukuoka Women's University**, Fukuoka
- **Kyushu Women's University**, Kitakyushu
- **Seinan Jo Gakuin University**, Kitakyushu

== Gifu ==
- **Gifu Women's University**, Gifu
- **Tokai Women's University**, Kakamigahara

== Gunma ==
- **Gunma Prefectural Women's University**, Tamamura

== Hiroshima ==
- **Hiroshima Bunkyo Women's University**, Asaminami
- **Hiroshima Jogakuin University**, Asakita
- Hiroshima Campus, Prefectural University of Hiroshima, Minami (co-ed since 1994)
- **Yasuda Women's University**, Asaminami
- **Kure University**, Kure

== Hyōgo ==
- **Kobe College**, Nishinomiya
- **Kobe Kaisei College**, Nada-ku
- **Kobe Shinwa Women's University**, Kita-ku
- **Kobe Shoin Women's University**, Nada-ku
- Kobe Pharmaceutical University, Higashinada (co-ed since 1994)
- **Kobe Women's University**, Suma
- Kobe Yamate University, Chūō-ku (co-ed since 2001)
- **Konan Women's University**, Higashinada
- **Mukogawa Women's University**, Nishinomiya - It will become coeducational in April 2027, changing its name to Mukogawa University.
- Otemae University, Nishinomiya (co-ed since 2000)
- Seiwa College, Nishinomiya (co-ed since 1981)
- **Sonoda Gakuen Women's University**, Amagasaki

== Kagoshima ==
- **Kagoshima Immaculate Heart University**, Kagoshima

== Kanagawa ==
- **Caritas Junior College**, Aoba-ku, Yokohama
- **Ferris University**, Izumi-ku, Yokohama
- **Kamakura Women's University**, Kamakura
- **Odawara Women's Junior College**, Odawara
- **Toyo Eiwa University**, Midori-ku, Yokohama
- **Sagami Women's University**, Sagamihara
- **Shoin University**, Atsugi (co-ed since 2004)
- **St. Cecilia Women's Junior College**, Yamato

== Kōchi ==
- **Kochi Women's University**, Kōchi (co-ed since April 2011)

== Kumamoto ==
- Kumamoto Prefectural University, Kumamoto (co-ed since 1994)

== Kyoto ==
- **Doshisha Women's College of Liberal Arts**, Kyōtanabe
- **Kyoto Koka Women's University**, Ukyō
- **Kyoto Notre Dame University**, Sakyō
- Kyoto Tachibana University, Yamashina (co-ed since 2005)
- **Kyoto Women's University**, Higashiyama
- **Kacho College**, Higashiyama

== Nagano ==
- Nagano Prefectural College, Nagano (co-ed since 2004)
- **Seisen Jogakuin College**, Nagano

== Nagasaki ==
- **Kwassui Women's College**, Nagasaki

== Nara ==
- **Nara Women's University**, Nara
- Tezukayama University, Nara (co-ed since 1987)

== Okayama ==
- Mimasaka University, Tsuyama (co-ed since 2003)
- **Nortre Dame Seishin University**, Okayama
- Shujitsu University, Okayama (co-ed since 2003)

== Osaka ==
- **Baika Women University**, Ibaraki
- **Heian Jogakuin (St. Agnes') University** - It will become coeducational in 2028.
- Kansai Medical University, Moriguchi (co-ed since 1954)
- Moriguchi Campus of Osaka International University, Moriguchi (co-ed since 2002)
- **Osaka Jogakuin College**, Osaka
- Daisen Campus, Osaka Prefecture University, Sakai (co-ed since 2005)
- **Osaka Shoin Women's University**, Higashiosaka
- Osaka Ohtani University, Tondabayashi (co-ed since 2006)
- **Senri Kinran University**, Suita
- Shitennoji International Buddhist University, Habikino (co-ed since 1981)
- Soai University, Osaka (co-ed since 1982)
- Tezukayama Gakuin University, Sakai (co-ed since 2003)

== Saitama ==
- Rissho Women's University (now Bunkyo University), Koshigaya (co-ed since 1976)

== Tokushima ==
- Shikoku University, Tokushima (co-ed since 1992)

== Tokyo ==
- Gakushuin Women's College, Shinjuku - Merged into Gakushuin University in 2026
- **Keisen University**, Tama
- **Japan Women's University**, Bunkyō Ward
- **Ochanomizu Women's University**, Bunkyō
- **Showa Women's University**, Setagaya
- **Tokyo Kasei University**, Itabashi
- **Tokyo Kasei-Gakuin University** , Chiyoda
- Tokyo Kaseigakuin—Tsukuba Women's University (now Tsukuba Gakuin University), Tsukuba (co-ed since 2005)
- **Tokyo Woman's Christian University**, Suginami
- **Tokyo Women's Medical University**, Shinjuku
- **Tsuda College**, Kodaira

== Yamaguchi ==
- Baiko Gakuin University, Shimonoseki (co-ed since 2001)
- Yamaguchi Prefectural University, Yamaguchi (co-ed since 1996)

== See also ==
- List of universities in Japan
