= Azuma, Gunma (Sawa) =

Dissolved municipality in Gunma prefecture, Japan

Azuma (東村, Azuma-mura) was a village located in Sawa District, Gunma Prefecture, Japan. The village was established in 1889.

As of 2003, the village had an estimated population of 21,408 and a density of 1,185.31 persons per km^{2}. The total area was 18.52 km^{2}.

On January 1, 2005, Azuma, along with the towns of Akabori and Sakai (all from Sawa District), was merged into the expanded city of Isesaki and no longer exists as an independent municipality.
