= Karasu River (Gunma) =

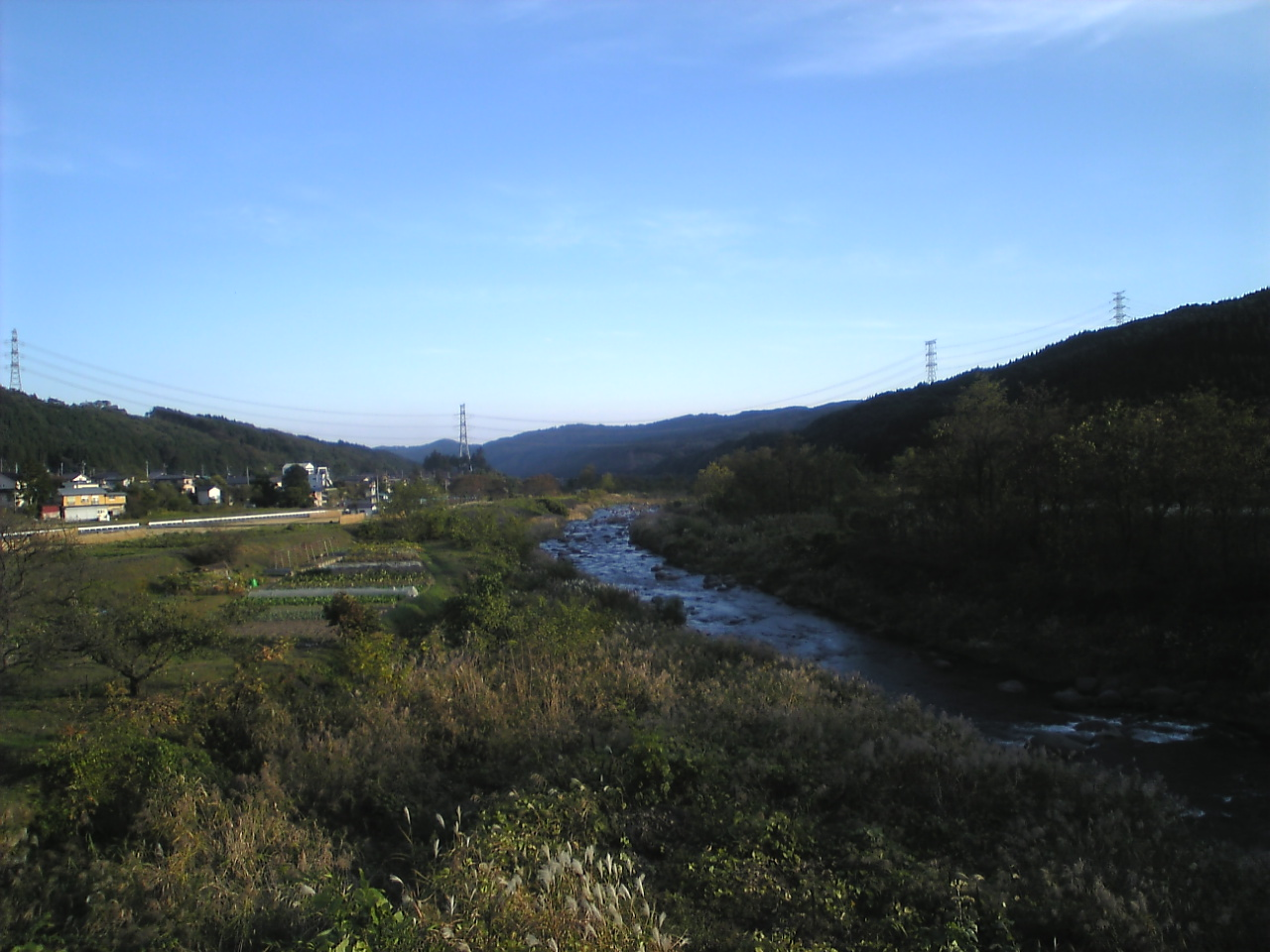
- The Karasu River flowing through Takasaki

- Native name: 烏川 (Japanese)

Location
- Country: Japan

Physical characteristics
- Source
  - location: Hanamagari Mountain (Takasaki)
- Mouth
  - location: Tone River in Honjō, Saitama
- Length: 61.8 km (38.4 mi)
- Basin size: 470 km^{2} (180 sq mi)

The Karasu River (烏川, Karasu-gawa) is a river located in Gunma Prefecture, Japan. It is a branch of the Tone River and the government of Japan classifies it as a Class 1 river. It generally flows in a south-easterly direction.

== River communities ==
The river passes through or forms the boundary of the following communities:

Gunma Prefecture
Takasaki, Fujioka, Tamamura
Nagano Prefecture
Saku
Saitama Prefecture
Kamisato, Honjō

== Scenic areas ==
The river runs through the Karasugawa Ravine in Takasaki, which has hiking trails for visitors to access the river.
