= Akabori, Gunma =

Town in Gunma, Japan

Akabori (赤堀町, Akabori-machi) was a town located in Sawa District, Gunma Prefecture, Japan.

As of 2003, the town had an estimated population of 18,603 and a density of 763.04 persons per km^{2}. The total area was 24.38 km^{2}.

On January 1, 2005, Akabori, along with the town of Sakai, and the village of Azuma (all from Sawa District), was merged into the expanded city of Isesaki and no longer exists as an independent municipality.
