= Seisen Jogakuin College (Junior College) =

Private junior college in Nagano, Japan

Coordinates: 36°41′10.6″N 138°14′13.5″E

- 清泉女学院短期大学
- Type: private
- Established: 1966
- Location: Nagano, Nagano, Japan
- Website: http://www.seisen-jc.jp/jc/index.php

Seisen Jogakuin College (清泉女学院短期大学, Seisen Jogakuin Tanki Daigaku) is a private junior college in Nagano, Japan. It was established in 1966 as a specialized training school. It became a junior college in 1981. It is now attached to Seisen Jogakuin College.

== Departments ==
- Department of English studies
- Department of Childcare

== See also ==
- List of junior colleges in Japan
