= GWU =

GWU may refer to:

== Education ==
- George Washington University, in Washington, DC
- Gardner–Webb University, in Boiling Springs, North Carolina
- George Wythe University, in Cedar City, Utah
- Gifu Women's University, in Gifu, Japan

== Trade unions ==
- Game Workers Unite
- Gambia Workers' Union
- General Workers' Union (Malta)
- General Workers' Union (Belize)
