= Kamiizumi, Saitama =

Dissolved municipality in Saitama prefecture, Japan

Kamiizumi (神泉村, Kamiizumi-mura) was a village located in Kodama District, Saitama Prefecture, Japan.

As of 2003, the village has an estimated population of 1,315 and a density of 54.23 persons per km^{2}. The total area is 24.25 km^{2}.

On January 1, 2006, Kamiizumi, was merged into the expanded town of Kamikawa.
