= List of Lambda Kappa Sigma chapters =

Lambda Kappa Sigma is an international pharmacy fraternity. It was established in 1913 as a professional group for women.

== Collegiate chapters ==
In the following list, active chapters are indicated in bold and inactive chapters are in italics.

Chapter	Charter date and range	Institution	Location	Status	Ref.
Alpha	October 14, 1913	Massachusetts College of Pharmacy and Health Sciences	Boston, Massachusetts	Inactive	
Gamma	February 27, 1918	University of Illinois College of Pharmac	Chicago, Illinois	Inactive	
**Beta**	April 11, 1918	Albany College of Pharmacy and Health Sciences	Albany, New York	Active	
**Delta**	April 18, 1918	University of Pittsburgh School of Pharmacy	Pittsburgh, Pennsylvania	Active	
Zeta	May 1919	University of California School of Pharmacy	San Francisco, California	Inactive	
**Eta**	February 9, 1920	St. Joseph’s University Philadelphia College of Pharmacy	Philadelphia, Pennsylvania	Active	
Theta	February 10, 1920	Creighton University School of Pharmacy	Omaha, Nebraska	Inactive	
Iota	April 9, 1920	University of Oklahoma College of Pharmacy	Norman, Oklahoma	Inactive	
Kappa	April 16, 1920	University of Kansas College of Pharmacy	Lawrence, Kansas	Inactive	
**Lambda**	April 4, 1921	University of Southern California School of Pharmacy	Los Angeles, California	Active	
Mu	January 12, 1922	Washington State University College of Pharmacy	Spokane, Washington	Inactive	
Nu	April 24, 1925	Drake University College of Pharmacy	Des Moines, Iowa	Inactive	
**Xi**	June 27, 1927	University of Rhode Island College of Pharmacy	Kingston, Rhode Island	Active	
Epsilon	May 2, 1929 – 19xx ?; 1987–xxxx ?	University of Maryland School of Pharmacy	Baltimore, Maryland	Inactive	
**Omicron**	April 4, 1930	Wayne State University College of Pharmacy	Detroit, Michigan	Active	
**Pi**	May 9, 1930	Ernest Mario School of Pharmacy at Rutgers University	New Brunswick, New Jersey	Active	
Rho	May 16, 1930	Oregon State University College of Pharmacy	Corvallis, Oregon	Inactive	
Sigma	March 11, 1931	Columbia University	New York City, New York	Inactive	
**Tau**	March 18, 1932	Duquesne University School of Pharmacy	Pittsburgh, Pennsylvania	Active	
Upsilon	May 30, 1936	Idaho State University College of Pharmacy	Pocatello, Idaho	Inactive	
**Phi**	June 5, 1938	Butler University College of Pharmacy	Indianapolis, Indiana	Active	
Chi	April 20, 1941	University of Washington School of Pharmacy	Seattle, Washington	Inactive	
Psi	September 28, 1947	Detroit Institute of Technology	Detroit, Michigan	Inactive	
**Alpha Alpha**	April 16, 1948	Temple University School of Pharmacy	Philadelphia, Pennsylvania	Active	
Omega	April 24, 1948	Medical University of South Carolina College of Pharmacy	Charleston, South Carolina	Inactive	
**Alpha Beta**	September 16, 1949	University of Connecticut School of Pharmacy	Storrs, Connecticut	Active	
Alpha Gamma	January 4, 1950	Samford University School of Pharmacy	Homewood, Alabama	Inactive	
Alpha Delta	November 18, 1950	University of Michigan College of Pharmacy	Ann Arbor, Michigan	Inactive	
**Alpha Zeta**	May 13, 1951	St. Louis College of Pharmacy	St. Louis, Missouri	Active	
Alpha Epsilon	May 18, 1951	University of Tennessee College of Pharmacy	Knoxville, Tennessee	Inactive	
**Alpha Eta**	June 6, 1951 – 19xx?; 1987	Arnold and Marie Schwartz College of Pharmacy Long Island University	Brooklyn, New York	Active	
**Alpha Theta**	May 23, 1952	University at Buffalo School of Pharmacy	Buffalo, New York	Active	
**Alpha Iota**	May 17, 1953	Ferris State University College of Pharmacy	Big Rapids, Michigan	Active	
**Alpha Kappa**	May 22, 1955	University of Georgia College of Pharmacy	Athens, Georgia	Active	
**Alpha Lambda**	April 28, 1956	University of British Columbia Faculty of Pharmaceutical Sciences	Vancouver, British Columbia, Canada	Active	
**Alpha Mu**	May 6, 1956	University of Toledo College of Pharmacy	Toledo, Ohio	Active	
**Alpha Nu**	December 6, 1958	University of Kentucky, College of Pharmacy	Lexington, Kentucky	Active	
Alpha Xi	September 26, 1959	University of the Pacific, School of Pharmacy	Stockton, California	Inactive	
**Alpha Omicron**	March 13, 1960	West Virginia University School of Pharmacy	Morgantown, West Virginia	Active	
Alpha Pi	May 6, 1961	St. John's University College of Pharmacy	New York City, New York	Inactive	
**Alpha Rho**	May 2, 1963	Northeastern University College of Pharmacy	Boston, Massachusetts	Active	
Alpha Sigma	February 21, 1970	Texas Southern University School of Pharmacy	Houston, Texas	Inactive	
Alpha Tau	September 22, 1987	University of Toronto Leslie Dan Faculty of Pharmacy	Toronto, Ontario, Canada	Inactive	
Alpha Upsilon	1988	Kobe Women's College of Pharmacy (now Kobe Pharmaceutical University)	Nishi-Ku, Kobe, Japan	Inactive	
**Alpha Phi**	1998	Wilkes University School of Pharmacy	Wilkes-Barre, Pennsylvania	Active	
**Alpha Chi**		Northeast Ohio Medical University College of Pharmacy	Rootstown, Ohio	Active	
Alpha Psi	April 27, 2013	University of New England, College of Pharmacy	Biddeford, Maine	Inactive	
Alpha Omega	September 13, 2014	Sullivan University College of Pharmacy	Louisville, Kentucky	Inactive	
Beta Alpha		D'Youville University School of Pharmacy	Buffalo, New York	Inactive	
**Beta Beta**	February 21, 2015	Western New England University College of Pharmacy	Springfield, Massachusetts	Active	
Beta Gamma		University of Charleston School of Pharmacy	Charleston, West Virginia	Inactive	
**Beta Delta**		Southern Illinois University Edwardsville	Edwardsville, Illinois	Active	
**Beta Epsilon**		University of Iowa	Iowa City, Iowa	Active	

== Alumni chapters ==
Following are the Lambda Kappa Sigma alumni chapters in order of charter date. Active chapters are indicated in bold. Inactive chapters are in italics.

Chapter	Charter date and range	Location	Status	Ref.
Beta Alumni	1923	Albany, New York	Inactive	(Note: The first two alumni chapters were founded as Alpha Alpha and Beta Beta. However, this nomenclature was discontinued in 1926, with alumni chapter names changing to match that of their related collegiate chapter.)
Zeta Alumni	1923	San Francisco, California	Inactive	
**Alpha Alumni**	1928	Boston, Massachusetts	Active	
Gamma Alumni	1928–19xx ?; 1992–xxxx ?	Chicago, Illinois	Inactive	
**Lambda Alumni**	1928	Los Angeles, California	Active	
Eta Alumni	1930	Philadelphia, Pennsylvania	Inactive	
**Xi Alumni**	1930	Lincoln, Rhode Island	Active	
Sigma Alumni	1940	New York, New York	Inactive	
**Omicron Alumni**	1942–xxxx ?; 2014	Detroit, Michigan	Active	
Rho Alumni	1943	Portland, Oregon	Inactive	
**Phi Alumni**	1947	Indianapolis, Indiana	Active	
**Chi Alumni**	1949	Shoreline, Washington	Active	
Delta Alumni	1949	Pittsburgh, Pennsylvania	Inactive	
**Epsilon Alumni**	1951	Baltimore, Maryland	Active	
**Tau Alumni**	1952	Pittsburgh, Pennsylvania	Active	
**Alpha Beta Alumni**	1954–xxxx ?; 2009	Storrs, Connecticut	Active	
Alpha Eta Alumni	1956	Brooklyn, New York	Inactive	
Alpha Theta Alumni	1960	Buffalo, New York	Inactive	
Stray Lamb/Alumni at Large	1960		Inactive ?	(Note: The fraternity called an alumna not affiliated with a specific chapter a Stray Lamb. At the 1986 convention, the By-Laws were amended to change the name to Alumni-at-Large.)
Alpha Gamma Alumni	1962	Birmingham, Alabama	Inactive	
Alpha Lambda Alumni	1963	Vancouver, British Columbia, Canada	Inactive	
Alpha Alpha Alumni	1970	Philadelphia, Pennsylvania	Inactive	
**Alpha Xi Alumni**	1970	Roseville, California	Active	
Alpha Sigma Alumni	1971	Houston, Texas	Inactive	
**Alpha Pi Alumni**	1972–19xx ?; 2003	Jamaica, New York	Active	
**Alpha Zeta Alumni**	1972	St. Louis, Missouri	Active	
Phoenix Metro Alumni	November 1971 November 1973	Phoenix, Arizona	Inactive	
Pi Alumni	1974	New Brunswick, New Jersey	Inactive	
Alpha Omicron Alumni	1975	Morgantown, West Virginia	Inactive	
Nu Alumni	1977	Des Moines, Iowa	Inactive	
**Alpha Nu Alumni**	1979	Lexington, Kentucky	Active	
**Alpha Iota Alumni**	1981	Big Rapids, Michigan	Active	
**Alpha Kappa Alumni**	1983	Mableton, Georgia	Active	
Alpha Tau Alumni	1987	Toronto, Ontario, Canada	Inactive	
Omega Alumni	1992	Charleston, South Carolina	Inactive	
Alpha Upsilon Alumni	1992	Nishi-Ku, Kobe, Japan	Inactive	
Portland Metro Alumni	1998	Portland, Oregon	Inactive	
**Alpha Rho Alumni**	19xx ?–19xx ?, 2003	Schnecksville, Pennsylvania	Active	
**Alpha Phi Alumni**		Wilkes-Barre, Pennsylvania	Active	
