= Sakai, Gunma =

Dissolved municipality in Gunma prefecture, Japan

Sakai (境町, Sakai-machi) was a town located in Sawa District, Gunma Prefecture, Japan.

== Population ==
As of 2003, the town had an estimated population of 31,221 and a density of 998.75 persons per km^{2}. The total area was 31.26 km^{2}.

== History ==
On January 1, 2005, Sakai, along with the town of Akabori, and the village of Azuma (all from Sawa District), was merged into the expanded city of Isesaki and no longer exists as an independent municipality.

== Gallery ==
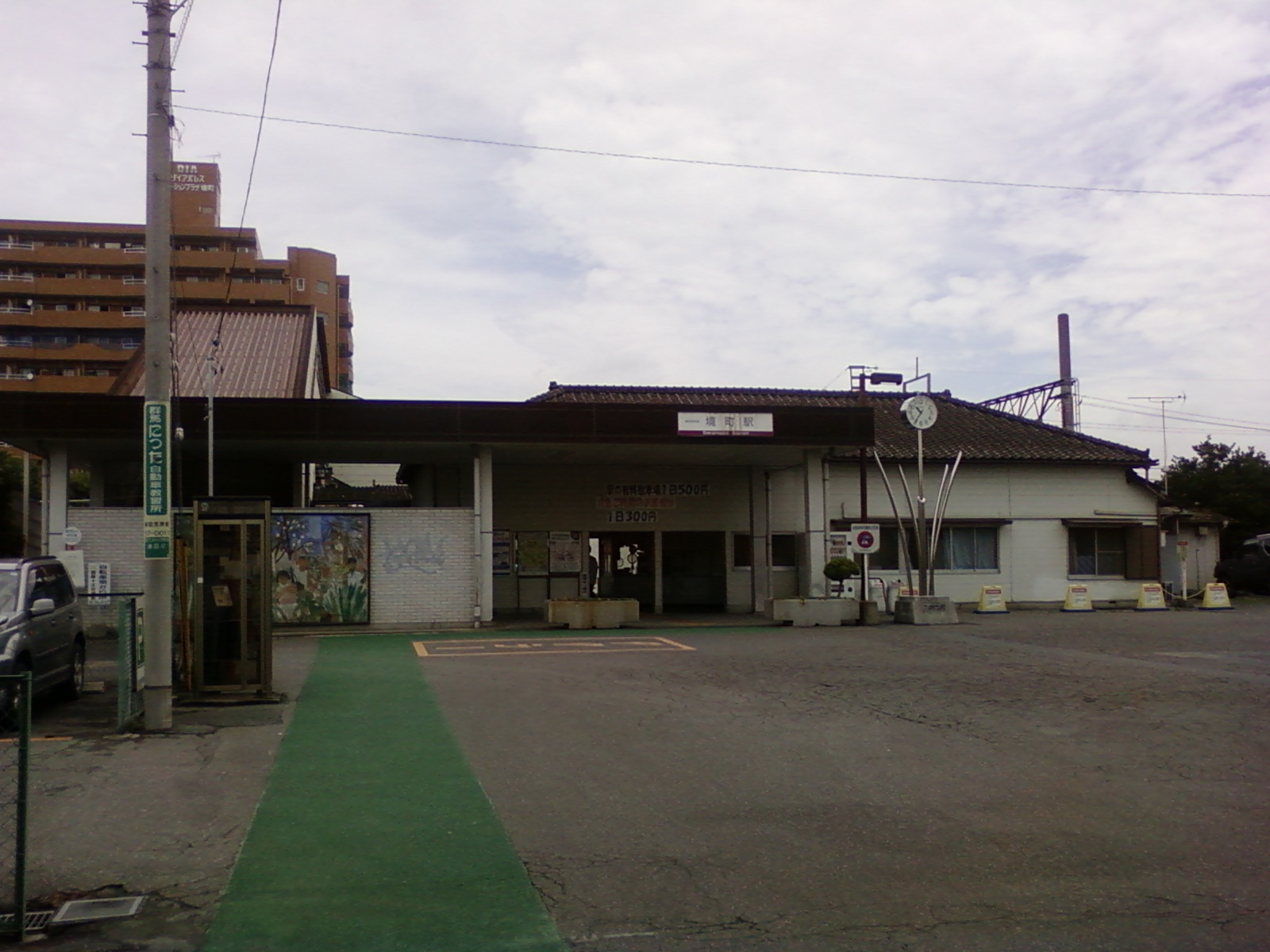
Sakai Machi Station

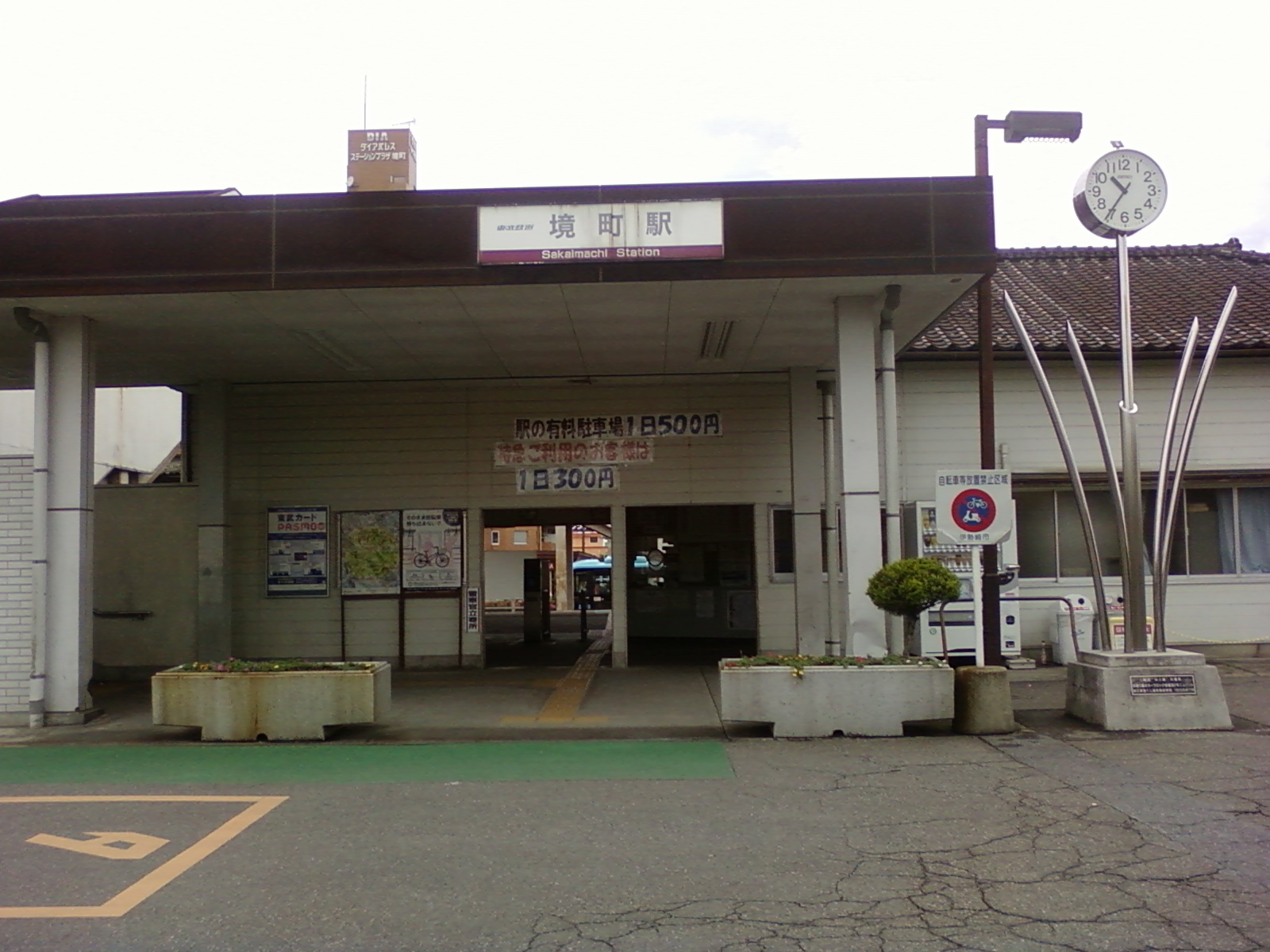
Sakai Machi Station
