= Isesaki =

Special city in Kantō, Japan

Isesaki 伊勢崎市
- Special city
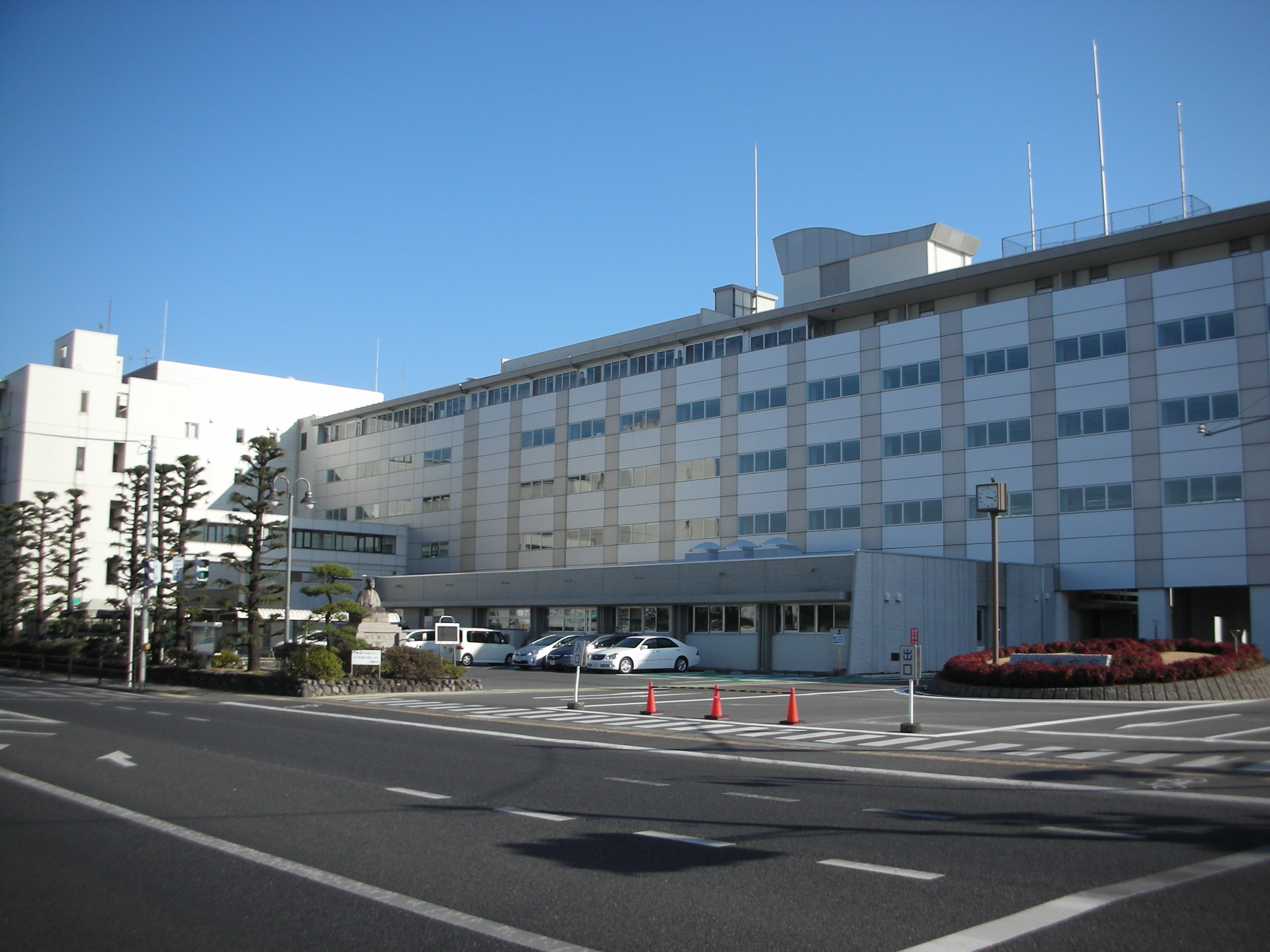
- Isesaki city hall

- Flag Seal

- Location of Isesaki in Gunma Prefecture

- Coordinates: 36°18′40.9″N 139°11′48.5″E
- Country: Japan
- Region: Kantō
- Prefecture: Gunma
- First official recorded: 535 AD
- City settled: September 13, 1940

Government
  - Mayor: Yasuo Hiji (from June 2021)

Area
  - Total: 139.44 km^{2} (53.84 sq mi)

Population (September 2020)
  - Total: 213,303
  - Density: 1,529.7/km^{2} (3,961.9/sq mi)
- Time zone: UTC+9 (Japan Standard Time)
- Phone number: 0270-24-5111
- Address: 2-410 Imaizumi-chō, Isesaki-shi, Gunma-ken 372-8501
- Climate: Cfa
- Website: Official website
- Symbols
- Flower: Azalea, Salvia splendens, Chrysanthemum, Narcissus
- Tree: Pine

Isesaki (伊勢崎市, Isesaki-shi; Japanese pronunciation: [ì.sé̞.sä̀.k̟ʲì, -sä́.k̟ʲi̥.ɕì]) is a city located in Gunma Prefecture, Japan. As of 1 September 2020, the city had an estimated population of 213,303 in 91,789 households, and a population density of 1500 persons per km^{2}. The total area of the city is 139.44 square kilometres (53.84 sq mi).

== Geography ==
Isesaki is located in the northwestern part of the Kantō Plain of southern Gunma Prefecture. It is adjacent to Saitama Prefecture across the Tone River, which runs through the southern part of the city. The distance to the center of the city is about 15 kilometres (9.3 mi) from Maebashi City, the prefectural capital of Gunma, 20 kilometres (12 mi) from Takasaki, and about 95 kilometres (59 mi) from central Tokyo.

=== Surrounding municipalities ===
Gunma Prefecture

- Kiryū
- Maebashi
- Midori
- Ōta
- Tamamura

Saitama Prefecture

- Fukaya
- Honjō

== Climate ==
Isesaki has a humid subtropical climate (Köppen Cfa) characterized by warm summers and cold winters with heavy snowfall. The average annual temperature in Isesaki is 14.5 °C. The average annual rainfall is 1256 mm with September as the wettest month. The temperatures are highest on average in August, at around 26.6 °C, and lowest in January, at around 3.3 °C. On August 5, 2025, Isesaki recorded a temperature of 41.8 °C (107.2 °F), the hottest temperature ever registered in Japanese history.

Climate data for Isesaki (1998–2020 normals, extremes 1998–present)
Month	Jan	Feb	Mar	Apr	May	Jun	Jul	Aug	Sep	Oct	Nov	Dec	Year
Record high °C (°F)	18.6 (65.5)	25.4 (77.7)	28.0 (82.4)	31.5 (88.7)	36.0 (96.8)	40.2 (104.4)	40.3 (104.5)	41.8 (107.2)	39.0 (102.2)	33.5 (92.3)	27.9 (82.2)	25.4 (77.7)	41.8 (107.2)
Mean daily maximum °C (°F)	9.4 (48.9)	10.4 (50.7)	14.0 (57.2)	19.6 (67.3)	24.9 (76.8)	27.6 (81.7)	31.2 (88.2)	32.5 (90.5)	28.2 (82.8)	22.3 (72.1)	16.8 (62.2)	11.8 (53.2)	20.7 (69.3)
Daily mean °C (°F)	4.1 (39.4)	4.9 (40.8)	8.4 (47.1)	13.7 (56.7)	19.1 (66.4)	22.6 (72.7)	26.3 (79.3)	27.4 (81.3)	23.5 (74.3)	17.6 (63.7)	11.6 (52.9)	6.3 (43.3)	15.5 (59.9)
Mean daily minimum °C (°F)	−0.6 (30.9)	0.0 (32.0)	3.1 (37.6)	8.2 (46.8)	13.9 (57.0)	18.5 (65.3)	22.4 (72.3)	23.5 (74.3)	19.8 (67.6)	13.6 (56.5)	6.8 (44.2)	1.5 (34.7)	10.9 (51.6)
Record low °C (°F)	−6.8 (19.8)	−5.6 (21.9)	−4.2 (24.4)	−0.6 (30.9)	5.6 (42.1)	11.6 (52.9)	16.5 (61.7)	16.5 (61.7)	9.3 (48.7)	3.1 (37.6)	−2.5 (27.5)	−5.6 (21.9)	−6.8 (19.8)
Average precipitation mm (inches)	28.8 (1.13)	25.3 (1.00)	49.8 (1.96)	73.8 (2.91)	99.3 (3.91)	139.9 (5.51)	190.4 (7.50)	169.9 (6.69)	184.4 (7.26)	149.7 (5.89)	43.0 (1.69)	27.1 (1.07)	1,176.5 (46.32)
Average precipitation days (≥ 1.0 mm)	2.9	3.6	6.6	7.8	9.4	11.7	14.3	10.8	11.5	8.8	5.3	3.7	96.0
Mean monthly sunshine hours	217.9	201.0	211.3	205.8	201.9	140.7	149.5	169.5	138.6	153.4	177.1	203.3	2,177
Source: Japan Meteorological Agency (1998–2020 normals; extremes 1998–present)

== Demographics ==
Per Japanese census data, the population of Isesaki has increased steadily over the past 60 years.

Historical population
Year	Pop.	±%
1960	130,555	—
1970	137,118	+5.0%
1980	159,069	+16.0%
1990	175,254	+10.2%
2000	194,393	+10.9%
2010	207,199	+6.6%
2020	211,850	+2.2%

== History ==
Isesaki developed during the Sengoku period as a castle town surrounding Akaishi Castle, a stronghold in southern Kōzuke Province controlled by the Yura clan. During the Edo period, it was the center of Isesaki Domain, a feudal domain under the Tokugawa shogunate controlled by the Sakai clan. The area also contained two post towns on the Nikkō Reiheishi Kaidō, a subroute to Nikkō Kaidō which connected the Nakasendō directly with Nikkō, bypassing Edo.

Isesaki Town was created within Sai District, Gunma Prefecture on April 1, 1889 with the creation of the modern municipalities system after the Meiji Restoration. Sai District and Nawa District merged to form Sawa District in 1896. It merged with the villages of Uehasu and Moro to form the city of Isesaki on September 13, 1940. On January 10, 1955 the village of Misato was annexed by Isesaki, followed by the villages of Nawa, Toyouke and Miyagō on March 25 of the same year.

On January 1, 2005 the towns of Akabori and Sakai, and village of Azuma were incorporated into Isesaki. On April 1, 2007, Isesaki was proclaimed a special city (tokureishi) with increased autonomy.

== Government ==
Isesaki has a mayor-council form of government with a directly elected mayor and a unicameral city council of 29 members. Isesaki contributes five members to the Gunma Prefectural Assembly. In terms of national politics, the city is part of the Gunma 2nd district of the lower house of the Diet of Japan.

== Economy ==
Isesaki (along with neighboring Kiryū) was traditionally famous for sericulture since ancient times, with a cloth called "Isesaki Meisen" as one of its most famous products. This cloth has been made since the late 17th century, and became popular during the Meiji and Taishō periods. Now, however, due to the ubiquity of Western-style clothes, its popularity is decreasing.

The automotive equipment and electrical equipment manufacturing company Sanden Corporation is headquartered in Isesaki. Also the city is home to Meisei Electric, a communications and electronics equipment and electric measuring instruments manufacturing company. Large industrial parks have been built in the suburbs, making it one of the leading industrial cities in the northern Kantō region.

It is also the location of J-List, a retailer of anime goods, visual novels and related products from Japan.

== Education ==
=== Universities ===
- Jobu University
- Tokyo University of Social Welfare – Isesaki Campus

=== Primary and secondary schools ===
Isesaki has 22 public elementary schools and 12 public middle schools operated by the city government, and five public high schools operated by the Gunma Prefectural Board of Education. Then prefecture also operates three special education schools for the handicapped.

Isesaki has a Peruvian international school (ペルー学校), Colegio Hispano Americano de Gunma.

== Transportation ==
=== Railway ===
JR East – Ryōmō Line

- Isesaki - Kunisada

Tobu Railway – Tobu Isesaki Line

- Sakaimachi - Gōshi - Shin-Isesaki - Isesaki

=== Highway ===
- Kita-Kantō Expressway – Isesaki Interchange, Hashie Parking Area
- National Route 17
- National Route 50
- National Route 354
- National Route 462

== Local attractions ==
- Former home of Tajima Yohei
- Grave of Kunisada Chūji
- Goshiki Onsen
- Isesaki Jinja
- Kezouji Park (Amusement park)

== Sister cities ==
- Teradomari, Niigata, Japan, friendship city since 1986
- Springfield, Missouri, United States, since 1986
- Ma'anshan, Anhui, China, friendship city since 1989

== Notable people ==
- Mitsuru Adachi, manga artist
- Tsutomu Adachi, manga artist
- Toshi Arai, rally driver
- Atsushi Imaruoka, voice actor
- Takashi Ishizeki, politician
- Hideo Ōshima, footballer and football manager
- Mr. Pogo, professional wrestler
- Hideto Takahashi, footballer
- Hinata Terayama, professional kickboxer
