= Kobe Shukugawa Gakuin University =

Coordinates: 34°39′56″N 135°12′16″E

- 神戸夙川学院大学
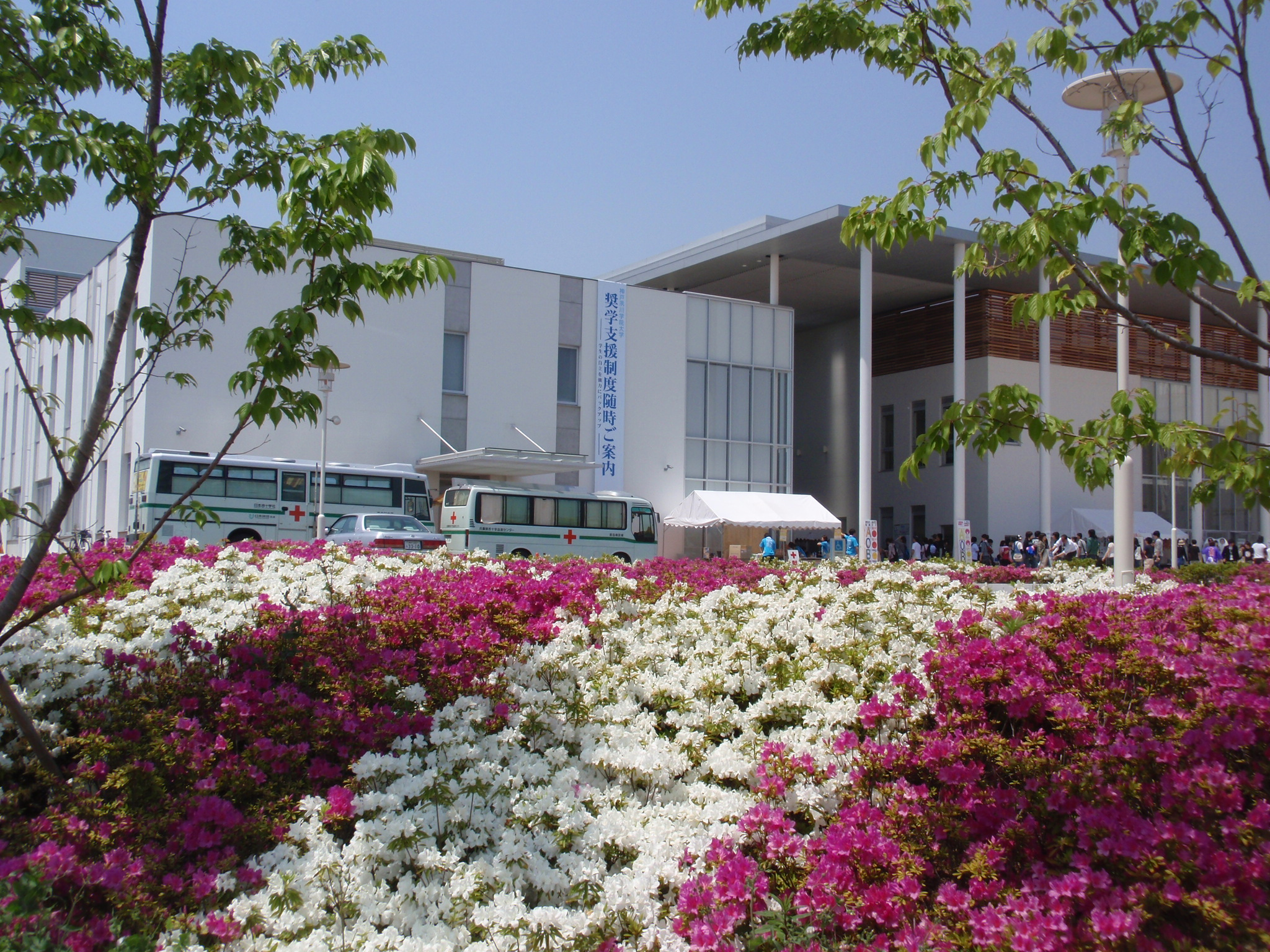
- Type: Private
- Established: 2007
- Academic staff: 33 full-time until March, 2015
- Location: 1-3-11 Minatojima, Kobe 650-0045 JAPAN, Kobe, Hyōgo, Japan
- Campus: Suburban / Urban
- Colors: Blue and white
- Website: www.kobeshukugawa.ac.jp

Kobe Shukugawa Gakuin University (神戸夙川学院大学, Kōbe shukugawa gakuin daigaku), colloquially abbreviated to {KSGU}, was a private non-sectarian and coeducational university located in Kobe, Japan. Established in 2007, it had been specialized in Tourism Studies. However, mainly due to the financial problems occurred in the management body, the university stopped admitting students from 2015 and almost all staffs and students moved to Kobe Yamate University after establishing a Tourism department there.

== History ==
- 2007 - Kobe Shukugawa Gakuin University was established as a four-year university for the education of tourism professionals.
- 2013 - Shukugawa Gakuin College moved its campus to the university.
- 2014 - Shukugawa Gakuin announced that it stops admitting students of this university.
- 2015 - Department of Tourism was established in Kobe Yamate University in succession to School of Tourism, Kobe Shukugawa Gakuin University.

== Campus ==
The campus of Kobe Shukugawa Gakuin University was located on Port Island in Kobe.

- Port Island Campus - (1-3-11 Minatojima, Kobe, Hyogo 650-0045)

== Organization ==
=== Faculty (Undergraduate Programs) ===
- School of Tourism
  - Department of Tourism
    - Culture and Nature Tourism
    - Health Tourism
    - Airlines and Cruise Tourism
    - Hotel Management and Coordinating Events

=== Attached organizations ===
- Research Center for English Education
- Research Center for Tourism Education
- Research Center for Region
- Career Center
- Extension Center

== See also ==
- Kobe Yamate University
- Shukugawa Gakuin College
