= Kodama District =

District in Saitama, Japan

Coordinates: 36.206°N 139.092°E

Kodama (児玉郡, Kodama-gun) is a district located in Saitama, Japan.

As of October 1, 2004, the district has an estimated population of 79,096. The total area is 163.10 km^{2}.

There are three towns located side by side with the city of Honjō.

- Kamikawa
- Kamisato
- Misato

== Municipal Timeline ==
- On January 1, 2006 the village of Kamiizumi merged with the old town of Kamikawa to form the new town of Kamikawa.
- On January 10, 2006 the town of Kodama merged with the old city of Honjō to form the new city of Honjō.
