= Tamamura =

Tamamura 玉村町
- Town
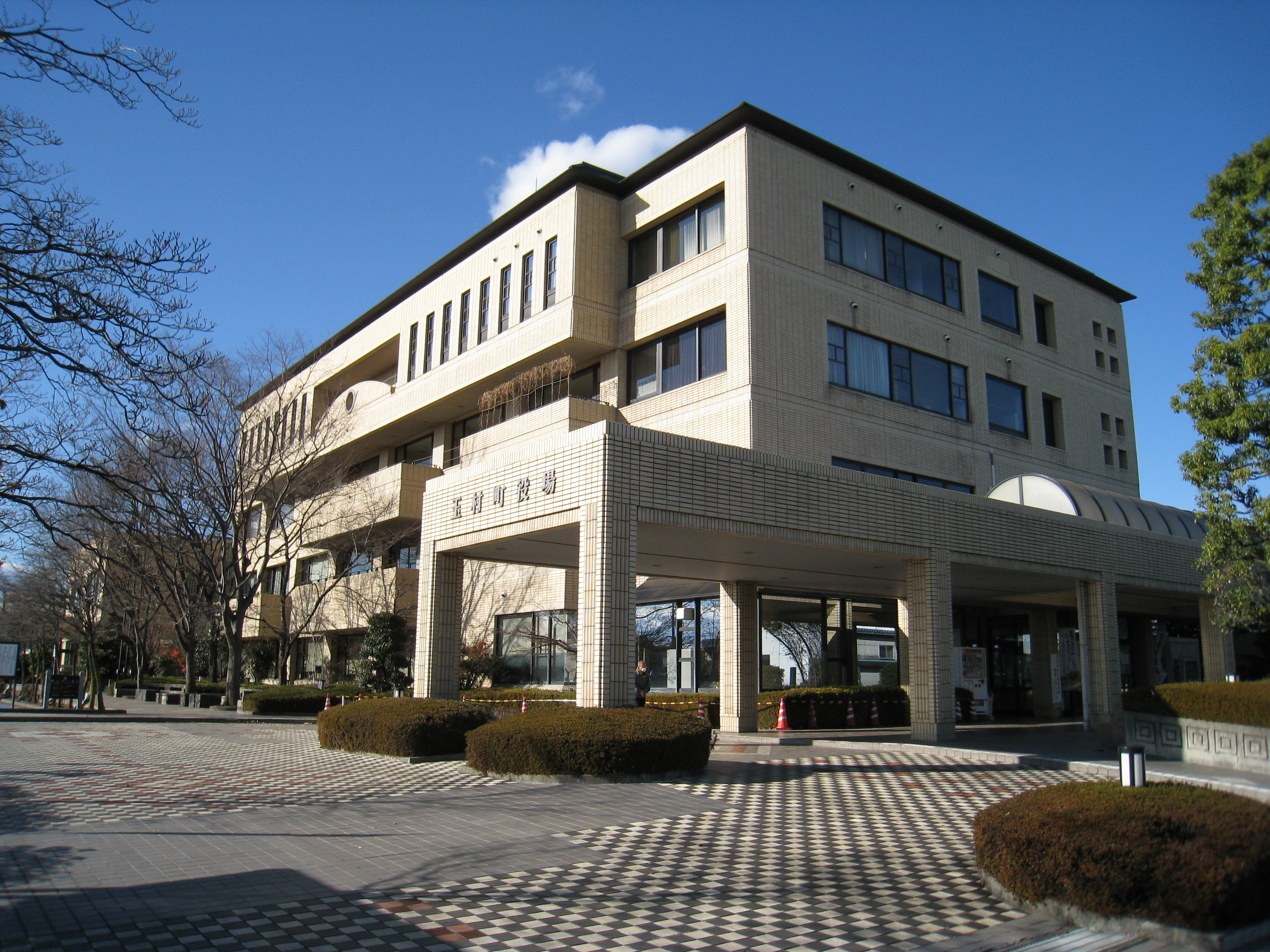
- Tamamura town hall

- Flag Seal

- Location of Tamamura in Gunma Prefecture

- Coordinates: 36°18′15.9″N 139°06′53.7″E
- Country: Japan
- Region: Kantō
- Prefecture: Gunma
- District: Sawa

Area
  - Total: 25.78 km^{2} (9.95 sq mi)

Population (September 2020)
  - Total: 36,367
  - Density: 1,411/km^{2} (3,654/sq mi)
- Time zone: UTC+9 (Japan Standard Time)
- Tree: Osmanthus
- Flower: Rose
- Phone number: 0270-65-2511
- Address: 201 Shimonitta, Tamamura-machi, Gunma-ken 370-1292
- Website: Official website

Tamamura (玉村町, Tamamura-machi) is a town located in Gunma Prefecture, Japan. As of 1 September 2020, the town had an estimated population of 36,367 in 15685 households, and a population density of 1440 persons per km^{2}. The total area of the town is 25.78 square kilometres (9.95 sq mi).

== Geography ==
Tamamura is located in southern Gunma prefecture in the northern extremity of the Kantō plains, bordering Saitama Prefecture to the south. The Tama River flows through the town.

- Rivers: Tone River, Karasu River

=== Surrounding municipalities ===
Gunma Prefecture

- Fujioka
- Isesaki
- Maebashi
- Takasaki

Saitama Prefecture

- Honjō
- Kamisato

=== Climate ===
Kanra has a humid subtropical climate (Köppen Cfa) characterized by hot summers and cold winters. The average annual temperature in Kanra is 14.5 °C. The average annual rainfall is 1250 mm with September as the wettest month. The temperatures are highest on average in August, at around 26.5 °C, and lowest in January, at around 3.4 °C.

== Demographics ==
Per Japanese census data, the population of Tamamura has recently plateaued after several decades of strong growth.

Historical population
Year	Pop.	±%
1960	13,833	—
1970	12,922	−6.6%
1980	17,643	+36.5%
1990	24,423	+38.4%
2000	37,522	+53.6%
2010	37,536	+0.0%
2020	36,054	−3.9%

== History ==
Tamamura developed during the Edo period as a post town on the Nikkō Reiheishi Kaidō, a subroute to Nikkō Kaidō which connects the Nakasendō with Nikkō, bypassing Edo.

Tamamura town was created within Nawa District, Gunma Prefecture on April 1, 1889, with the creation of the modern municipalities system after the Meiji Restoration. Nawa District and Sai District merged to form Sawa District in 1896. On April 10, 1955, Tamamura annexed the neighboring village of Shibane, followed by Jōyō on August 1, 1957.

== Government ==
Tamamura has a mayor-council form of government with a directly elected mayor and a unicameral town council of 13 members. Tamamura contributes one member to the Gunma Prefectural Assembly. In terms of national politics, the town is part of Gunma 2nd district of the lower house of the Diet of Japan.

== Economy ==
Many people were employed in sericulture in the past.

- Agriculture - 877 people (5.1%)
- Manufacturing - 6957 people (40.2%)
- Service - 9490 people (54.8%)

== Education ==
Kanra has five public elementary schools and two public middle schools operated by the town government and one public high school operated by the Gunma Prefectural Board of Education. The town also has one private elementary school.

- Universities
  - Gunma Prefectural Women's University

== Transportation ==
=== Railway ===
Tamamura does not have any passenger railway service. The nearest station is Shinmachi Station in the neighboring city of Takasaki.

=== Highway ===
- Jōshin-etsu Expressway – Takasaki-Tamamura Smart IC
- National Route 354
