= Kodama, Saitama =

Town in Saitama Prefecture, Japan

Coordinates: 36°11′N 139°08′E

Kodama (児玉町, Kodama-machi) was a town located in Kodama District, Saitama Prefecture, Japan.

As of 2003, the town had an estimated population of 21,252 and a density of 401.06 persons per km^{2}. The total area was 52.99 km^{2}.

On January 10, 2006, Kodama was merged into the expanded city of Honjō and no longer exists as an independent municipality.
