= Kobe Kaisei College =

Private women's college in Nada, Kobe, Hyōgo, Japan

Coordinates: 34°42′44″N 135°12′43″E

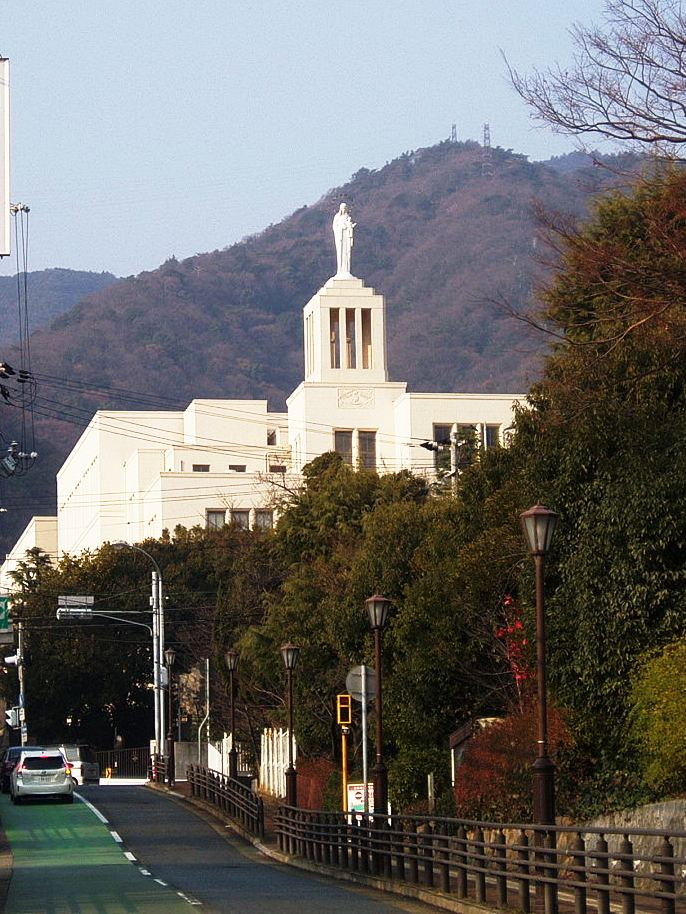
Kobe Kaisei College

Kobe Kaisei College (神戸海星女子学院大学, Kobe kaisei joshi-gakuin daigaku) is a private women's college in Nada, Kobe, Hyōgo, Japan.

== History ==
The institution was first established as a primary school, and a junior and senior high school in 1951. A junior college was next established in 1955, followed by the opening of a college (university) in 1965. The institution is owned and operated by the Franciscan Missionaries of Mary. It is one of a number of the city's oldest schools that were founded by foreigners to provide a Christian education.

The board made the decision that the college would stop admitting students from 2024 and close in 2027 when the last cohort graduates.

== Academics ==
The school focuses on an humanities-based Christian education. They provide instruction in Japanese, English and French, with alumni being known for their ability to speak foreign languages. The school also operates exchange programs with other schools.

The university awards Bachelor of Arts degrees. In 1981, the school had an enrolment of approximately 300 students with 40 faculty.

== Also known as ==
The school is also referred to in English as:

- Kobe Kaisei (Stella Maris) College
- Kobe Kaisei Women's College; or
- Kobe Kaisei Women's Collegiate.

== College president ==
- Sister Astuko Hirai, bef. 1994

== Notable alumni ==
- Noriko Hiroi, operatic singer
- Fumiko Yamasaki, operatic singer
- Yuki Nitta, scientist
- Mariko Kaga, professor

== See also ==
- Kobe Kaisei Girls' Junior & Senior High School
