= Shukugawa Gakuin College =

- 夙川学院短期大学
- Type: Private junior college
- Established: 1965
- Academic staff: Childcare
- Location: Chūō-ku, Kobe, Hyōgo Prefecture, Japan
- Website: http://www.shukugawa-c.ac.jp/

Shukugawa Gakuin College (夙川学院短期大学, Shukugawa Gakuin Tanki Daigakubu) is a private junior college in Chūō-ku, Kobe in Hyōgo Prefecture, Japan.

== History ==
The school was founded in 1880. In 2013, it became coeducational.

== Courses ==
It offers courses in childcare.

== See also ==
- Kobe Shukugawa Gakuin University
- List of junior colleges in Japan
