= Sai District, Gunma =

Former district in Gunma prefecture, Japan

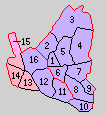
Historic Map of Sawa District: 1. Isesaki, 2. Misato, 3. Akabori, 4. Azuma, 5. Uehasu, 6. Moro, 7. Uneme, 8. Gōshi, 9. Sakai, 10. Shima, 11.Toyouke, 12.Nawa, 13. Shibane, 14. Tamamura, 15. Jōyō, 16. Miyagō; Purple = former Sai District

Sai District (佐位郡, Sai-gun) was formerly a rural district located in Gunma Prefecture, Japan. The district is now entirely part of the city of Isesaki.

Sai District was created on December 7, 1878, with the reorganization of Gunma Prefecture into districts. It included 2 towns (Isesaki and Sakai) and 13 villages, which were formerly part of the holdings of Isezaki Domain, 3 villages which belonged to Ichinomiya Domain in Kazusa Province, 1 village which belonged to Maebashi Domain and 20 villages which were part of the tenryō holdings in Kōzuke Province under the direct control of the Tokugawa shogunate. With the establishment of the municipalities system on April 1, 1889, the area was organized as a two towns and eight villages.

On April 1, 1896, the district was merged with Nawa District to form Sawa District

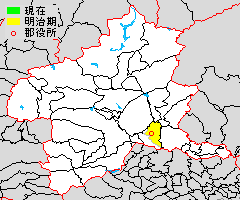
Location of Sai District within Gunma Prefecture
