= Kobe Kaisei Girls' Junior & Senior High School =

Girls' high school in Nada-ku, Kobe, Japan

Coordinates: 34°42′44″N 135°12′42″E

- 神戸海星女子学院中学校・高等学校
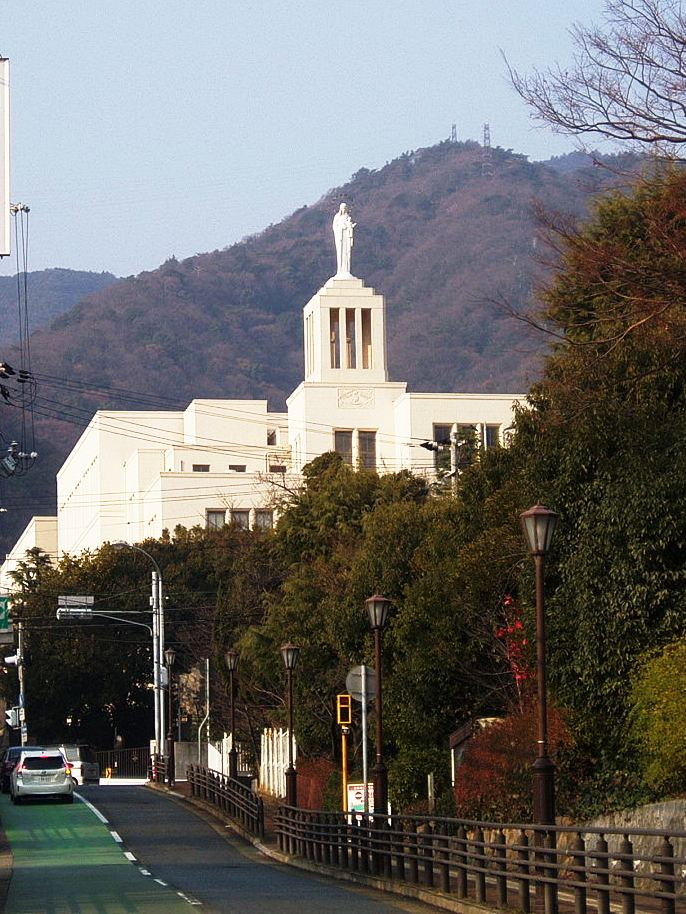
- The school in 2014

Information
- Religious affiliation: Catholicism
- Denomination: Franciscan Missionaries of Mary
- Website: www.kobekaisei.ed.jp

Kobe Kaisei Girls' Junior & Senior High School (神戸海星女子学院中学校・高等学校, Kōbe Kaisei Joshi Gakuin Chūgakkō Kōtōgakkō) is a girls' junior and senior high school in Nada-ku, Kobe, Japan.

It was established in 1951 by the Franciscan Missionaries of Mary.
