= Fukuoka Women's University =

University in Fukuoka Japan

Coordinates: 33°39′57″N 130°26′21″E

- 福岡女子大学
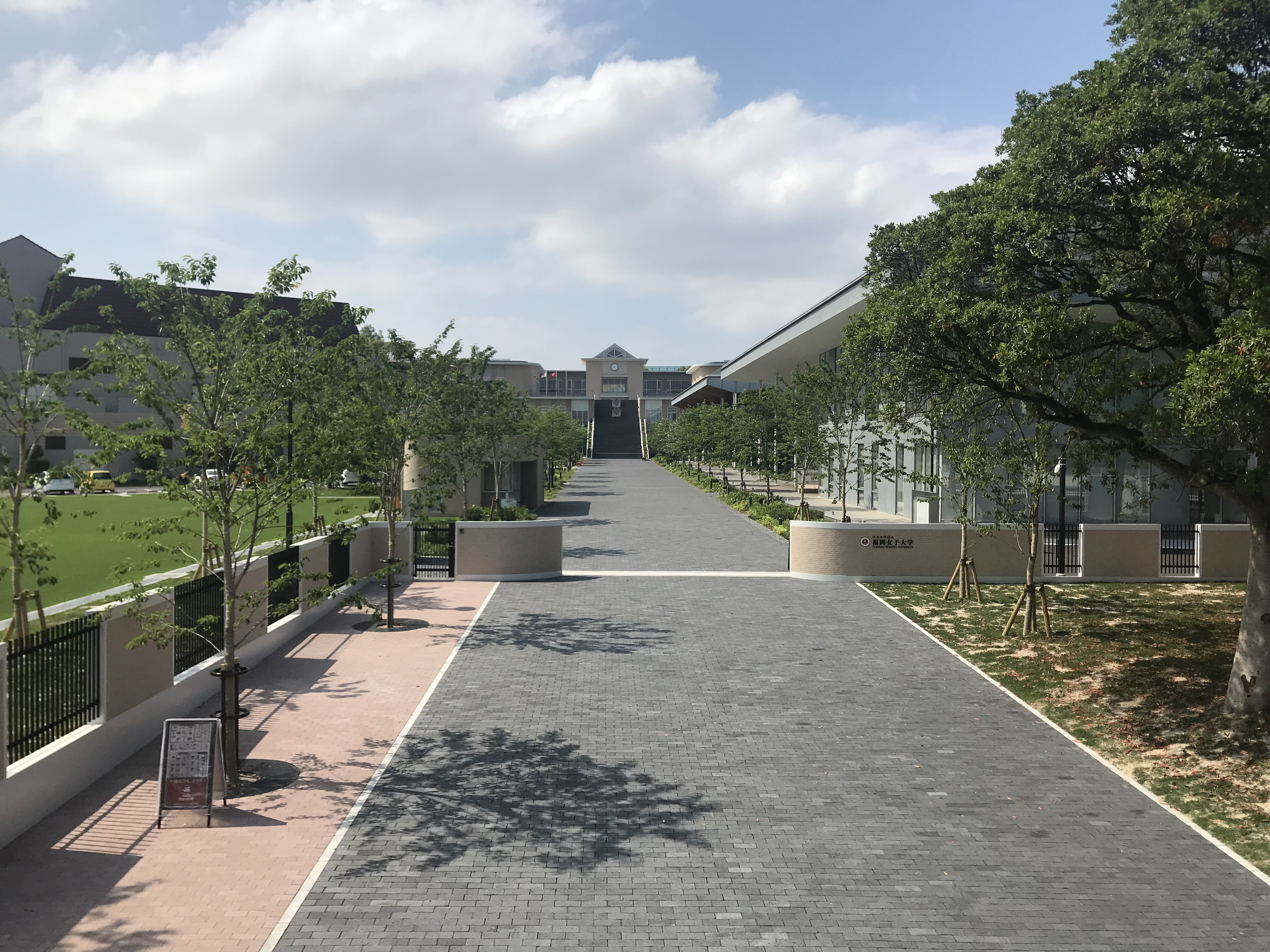
- Type: Public
- Established: 1923 (chartered 1950)
- Location: Fukuoka, Fukuoka, Japan
- Website: Official website

Fukuoka Women's University (福岡女子大学, Fukuoka Joshi Daigaku) is a public university in Fukuoka, Fukuoka Prefecture, Japan. Established in 1923, it was chartered as a university in 1950. Alongside Gunma Prefectural Women's University, it is one of the two public women's universities in Japan. Its abbreviated form is Fukujodai.

== History ==
The school was founded in 1923 as Fukuoka Prefectural Women's Vocational School. It was chartered as a university in 1950, following the Japanese school reform after World War II.
