= Tsukuba Gakuin University =

Private university in Tsukuba City, Ibaraki

Coordinates: 36°05′18″N 140°06′27″E

- 筑波学院大学
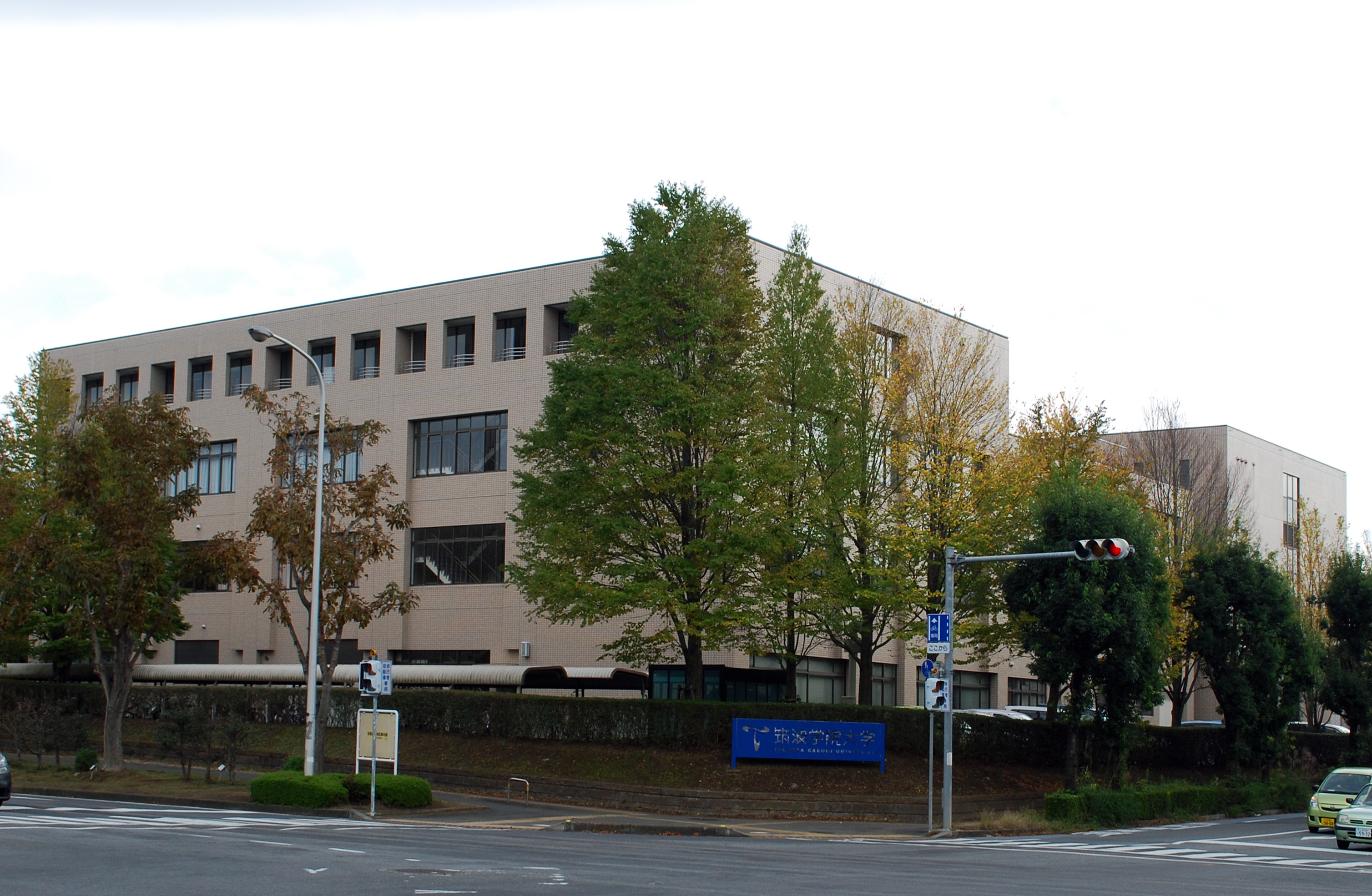
- Type: Private
- Established: 1990
- Location: Tsukuba, Ibaraki, Japan
- Website: Official website

Tsukuba Gakuin University (筑波学院大学, Tsukuba gakuin daigaku) is a private university in Tsukuba, Ibaraki, Japan.

== History ==
Founded as a junior women's college in 1990, the Tokyo Kaseigakuin—Tsukuba Junior College (東京家政学院筑波短期大学), was raised to a four-year college in 1996, and renamed the Tokyo Kaseigakuin—Tsukuba Women's University (東京家政学院筑波女子大学). In 2005 it became coeducational, adopting the present name at the same time.
