= Nawa District, Gunma =

Former rural district in Gunma prefecture, Japan

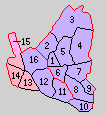
Historic Map of Sawa District: 1. Isesaki, 2. Misato, 3. Akabori, 4. Azuma, 5. Uehasu, 6. Moro, 7. Uneme, 8. Gōshi, 9. Sakai, 10. Shima, 11.Toyouke, 12.Nawa, 13. Shibane, 14. Tamamura, 15. Jōyō, 16. Miyagō; Red and Orange = former Nawa District

Nawa District (那波郡, Nawa-gun) was formerly a rural district in Gunma Prefecture, Japan. The district is now divided between the cities of Isesaki and Maebashi, with a remaining portion forming Sawa District and the town of Tamamura.

== History ==
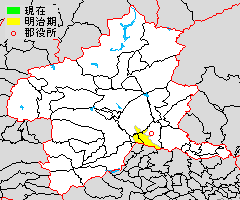
Map showing location of Nawa District within Gunma Prefecture

Nawa District was created on December 7, 1878, with the reorganization of Gunma Prefecture into districts. It included 2 towns (Naka and Shiba), 22.5 villages which were formerly part of the holdings of Isezaki Domain, 9.5 villages which belonged to Maebashi Domain, 1 village each to Yoshii Domain, Takasaki Domain and Iwatsuki Domain, and 20 villages which were part of the tenryō holdings in Kōzuke Province under the direct control of the Tokugawa shogunate. With the establishment of the municipalities system on April 1, 1889, the area was organized as one town (Tamamura) and five villages.

On April 1, 1896, the district was merged with Sai District to form Sawa District.
