= Kamikawa, Saitama =

Kamikawa 神川町
- Town
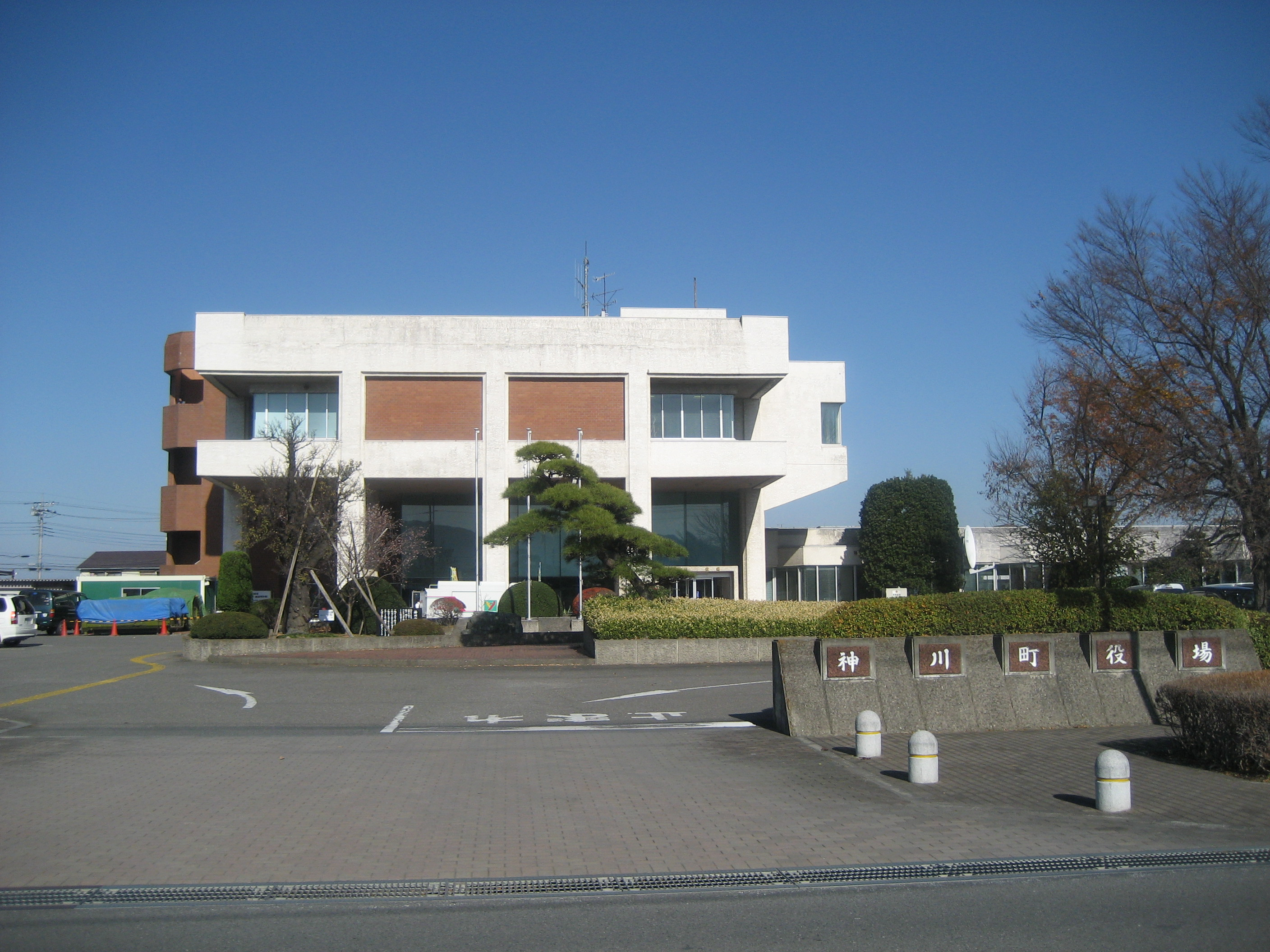
- Kamikawa town office

- Flag Seal

- Location of Kamikawa in Saitama Prefecture

- Coordinates: 36°12′50″N 139°6′6.2″E
- Country: Japan
- Region: Kantō
- Prefecture: Saitama
- District: Kodama

Area
  - Total: 47.40 km^{2} (18.30 sq mi)

Population (February 2021)
  - Total: 13,369
  - Density: 282.0/km^{2} (730.5/sq mi)
- Time zone: UTC+9 (Japan Standard Time)
- Tree: Sakura
- Flower: Cosmos
- Bird: Japanese bush warbler
- Phone number: 0495-77-2111
- Address: 909 Uetake, Kamikawa-machi, Kodama-gun, Saitama-ken 367-0292
- Website: Official website

Kamikawa (神川町, Kamikawa-machi) is a town located in Saitama Prefecture, Japan. As of 1 February 2021, the town had an estimated population of 13,369 in 5774 households and a population density of 280 persons per km^{2}. The total area of the town is 47.40 square kilometres (18.30 sq mi).

== Geography ==
Kamikawa is located on the extreme western border of Saitama Prefecture, separated from Gunma Prefecture by the Kanna River, and isolated from the remainder of Saitama by the Chichibu Mountains.

=== Surrounding municipalities ===
Gunma Prefecture

- Fujioka

Saitama Prefecture

- Chichibu
- Honjō
- Kamisato
- Minano

=== Climate ===
Kamikawa has a humid subtropical climate (Köppen Cfa) characterized by warm summers and cool winters with light to no snowfall. The average annual temperature in Kamikawa is 12.6 °C. The average annual rainfall is 2028 mm with September as the wettest month. The temperatures are highest on average in August, at around 24.0 °C, and lowest in January, at around 1.3 °C.

== Demographics ==
Per Japanese census data, the population of Kamikawa has remained relatively steady over the past 70 years.

Historical population
Year	Pop.	±%
1920	10,750	—
1930	10,523	−2.1%
1940	11,171	+6.2%
1950	13,834	+23.8%
1960	12,397	−10.4%
1970	11,425	−7.8%
1980	12,012	+5.1%
1990	13,564	+12.9%
2000	15,197	+12.0%
2010	14,470	−4.8%
2020	13,359	−7.7%

== History ==
The area around Kamikawa was part of ancient Musashi Province. The village of Tanshō was created within Kami District, Saitama and the villages of Wakaizumi and Aoyagi were created within Kodama District, Saitama with the establishment of the modern municipalities system on April 1, 1889. Kami District was abolished in 1896, becoming part of Kodama District. On December 1, 1949, Wakaizumi split into Watarase and Aguhara. On May 3, 1954, the Tanshō and Aoyagi merged to form the village of Kamikawa. Kamikawa annexed Watarase on May 3, 1957, and was elevated to town status on October 1, 1987. On January 1, 2006, Kamikawa merged with neighboring Kamiizumi village.

== Government ==
Kamikawa has a mayor-council form of government with a directly elected mayor and a unicameral town council of 12 members. Kamikawa, together with the city of Honjō and town of Kamisato, contributes two members to the Saitama Prefectural Assembly. In terms of national politics, the town is part of Saitama 11th district of the lower house of the Diet of Japan.

== Economy ==
Kamikawa has some light manufacturing; however, many people commute to neighboring Honjō.

== Education ==
Kamikawa has four public elementary schools and one public middle school operated by the town government. The town does not have a high school.

== Transportation ==
=== Railway ===
JR East - Hachikō Line

- Tanshō

=== Highway ===
- National Route 254
- National Route 462

== Local attractions ==
- Kanasana Shrine
- Mizube Koen
- Sanba Gorge
- Shimokubo Dam
- Shinsui Dam
