= Honjō, Saitama =

Honjō 本庄市
- City
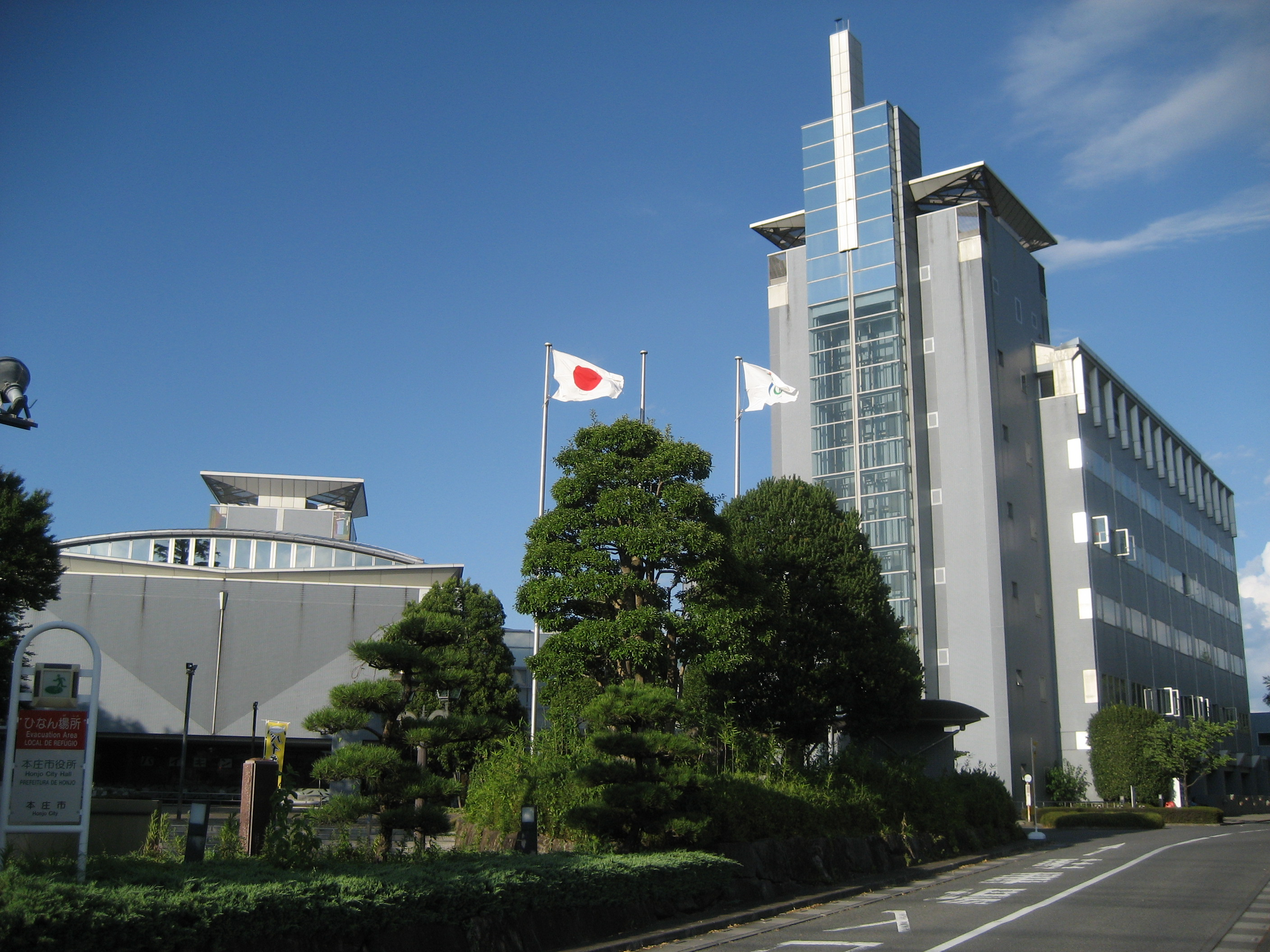
- Honjō city hall

- Flag Seal

- Location of Honjō in Saitama Prefecture

- Coordinates: 36°14′36.9″N 139°11′25.4″E
- Country: Japan
- Region: Kantō
- Prefecture: Saitama

Area
  - Total: 89.69 km^{2} (34.63 sq mi)

Population (January 2021)
  - Total: 77,900
  - Density: 869/km^{2} (2,250/sq mi)
- Time zone: UTC+9 (Japan Standard Time)
- Tree: Osmanthus
- Flower: Oenothera tetraptera (Tsukimiso in Japanese)
- Phone number: 0495-25-1111
- Address: 3-5-3 Honjo, Honjo-shi, Saitama-ken 367-8501
- Website: Official website

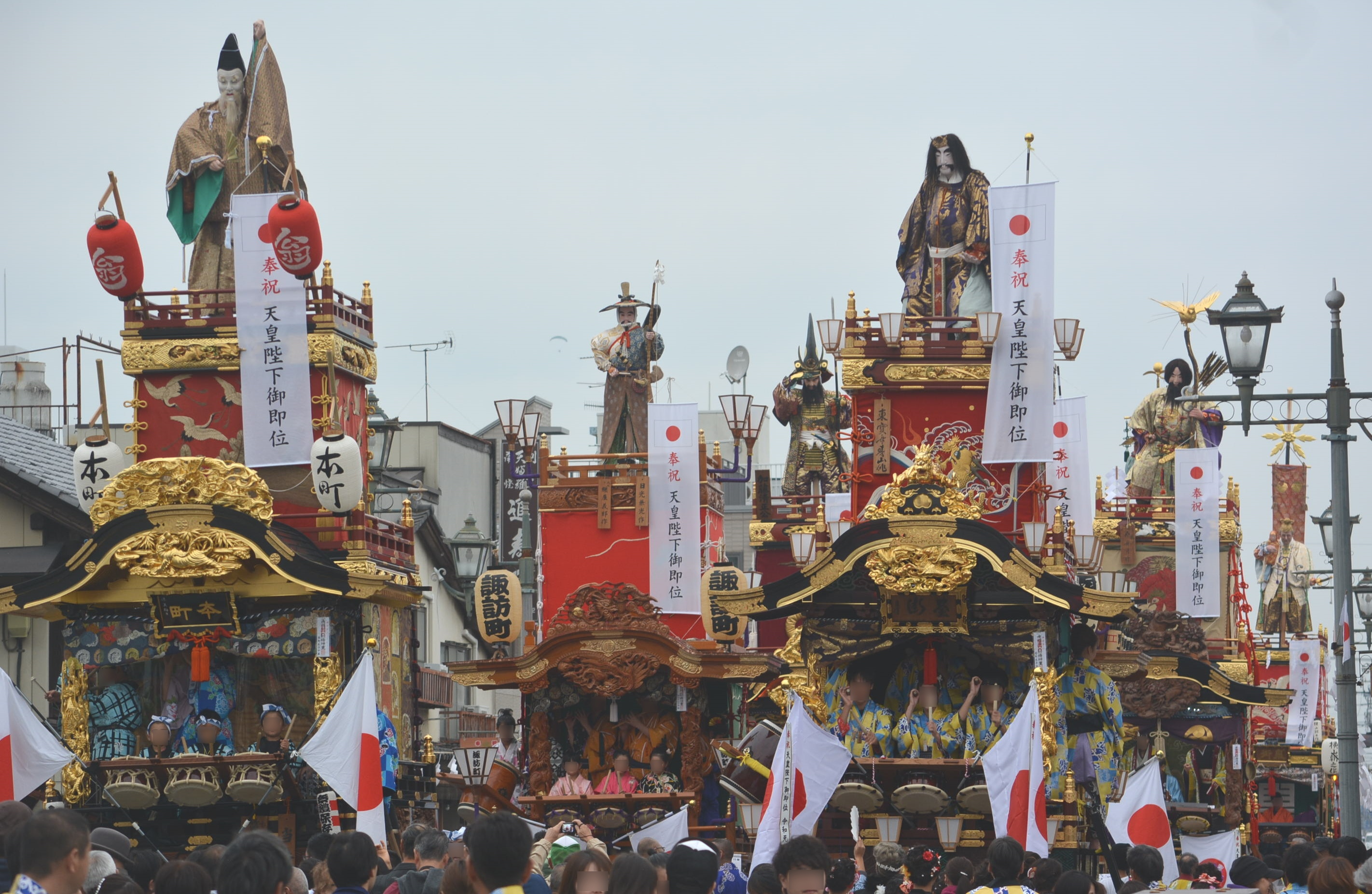
Honjō Matsuri

Honjō (本庄市, Honjō-shi) is a city located in Saitama Prefecture, Japan. As of 1 January 2021, the city had an estimated population of 77,900 in 35,026 households and a population density of 870 persons per km^{2}. The total area of the city is 89.69 square kilometres (34.63 sq mi).

== Geography ==
Honjō is located on the northwestern border of Saitama Prefecture, bordered by the upper reaches of the Tone River to the north.

=== Surrounding municipalities ===
Gunma Prefecture

- Isesaki
- Tamamura

Saitama Prefecture

- Fukaya
- Kamikawa
- Kamisato
- Minano
- Nagatoro

=== Climate ===
Honjō has a humid subtropical climate (Köppen Cfa) characterized by warm summers and cool winters with light to no snowfall. The average annual temperature in Honjō is 14.5 °C. The average annual rainfall is 1258 mm with September as the wettest month. The temperatures are highest on average in August, at around 26.7 °C, and lowest in January, at around 3.9 °C.

== Demographics ==
Per Japanese census data, the population of Honjō peaked around the year 2000 and has declined since.

Historical population
| Year | Pop. | ±% |
|---|---|---|
| 1920 | 43,369 | — |
| 1930 | 48,841 | +12.6% |
| 1940 | 49,783 | +1.9% |
| 1950 | 61,703 | +23.9% |
| 1960 | 58,569 | −5.1% |
| 1970 | 65,187 | +11.3% |
| 1980 | 72,089 | +10.6% |
| 1990 | 78,551 | +9.0% |
| 2000 | 82,670 | +5.2% |
| 2010 | 81,889 | −0.9% |
| 2020 | 78,569 | −4.1% |

== History ==
The area of Honjō has been inhabited since prehistoric times and numerous burial mounds from the Kofun period have been found in the area. During the Kamakura period, the area was dominated by the Honjō clan, who continued to rule over a castle town and eventually the short-lived Honjō Domain during the early Tokugawa shogunate of the Edo period. After the suppression of Honjō Domain, the town continued to prosper as Honjō-juku, a post station on the Nakasendo highway. During the late Edo period and early Meiji period, the area was noted for sericulture. The town of Honjō was created within Kodama District, Saitama with the establishment of the modern municipalities system on April 1, 1889. Honjō was elevated to city status on July 1, 1954 by merging with neighboring Fujita, Nitte, Asahi and Kitaizumi villages. On January 10, 2006, the town of Kodama was merged into Honjō.

== Government ==
Honjō has a mayor-council form of government with a directly elected mayor and a unicameral city council of 21 members. Honjō, together with the towns of Kamikawa and Kamisato, contributes two members to the Saitama Prefectural Assembly. In terms of national politics, the city is part of Saitama 11th district of the lower house of the Diet of Japan.

== Economy ==
The economy of Honjō is based on light and precision manufacturing and agriculture, and the city is also a regional commercial center.

== Education ==
- Waseda University has a campus at Honjō
- Honjō has 13 public elementary schools and four public middle schools operated by the city government, and three public high schools operated by the Saitama Prefectural Board of Education. In addition, there are two private combined middle/high schools and one private high school. The prefecture also operates one special education school for the handicapped.
- International schools: Escola Intercultural Unificada Arco Íris - Brazilian school Previously the city hosted another Brazilian school, Centro de Aprendizagem Logos.

== Transportation ==
=== Railway ===
JR East –Joetsu Shinkansen

- Honjō-Waseda

JR East – Takasaki Line

- Honjō

JR East – Hachikō Line

- Kodama

=== Highway ===
- Kan-etsu Expressway – Honjō-Kodama IC
- National Route 17
- National Route 254
- National Route 462

== Sister cities ==
- Kazo, Saitama, Japan
- Shibukawa, Gunma, Japan
- Taiwan Tainan

== Local attractions ==
- Honjō Circuit, a small motorsports circuit
- Honjo City Museum of History and Folklore
- Maze Dam
- Sagiyama kofun

== Notable people ==
- Sayuri Inoue, actress, a former member of the idol group Nogizaka46
- Yukiko Kada, politician
- Jaki Numazawa, professional wrestler
- Takekoshi Yosaburō, historian and politician
