= Gunma Prefectural Women's University =

Public university in Japan

Coordinates: 36°17′49.76″N 139°6′46.84″E

- 群馬県立女子大学
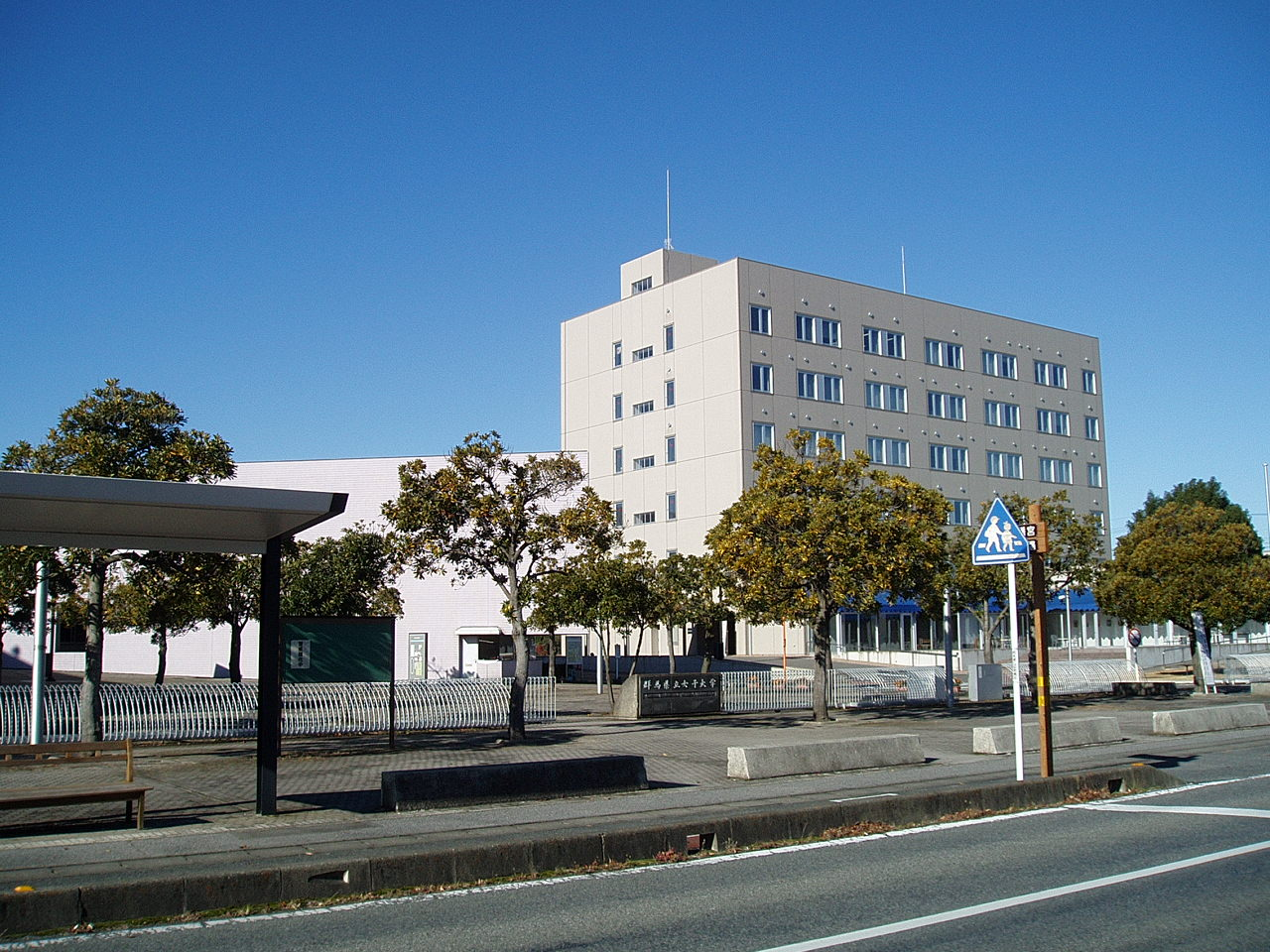
- Type: Public
- Established: 1980
- Location: Tamamura, Gunma, Japan
- Website: Official home page

Gunma Prefectural Women's University (群馬県立女子大学, Gunma kenritsu joshi daigaku) is a public university in Tamamura, Gunma Prefecture, Japan. Established in 1980, it is one of the two public women's universities in Japan, alongside Fukuoka Women's University.

== History ==
The school was established in 1980 in the city of Maebashi and relocated to Tamamura in 1982. A graduate (doctoral) program was established in 1994.
