= Kamisato, Saitama =

Kamisato 上里町
- Town
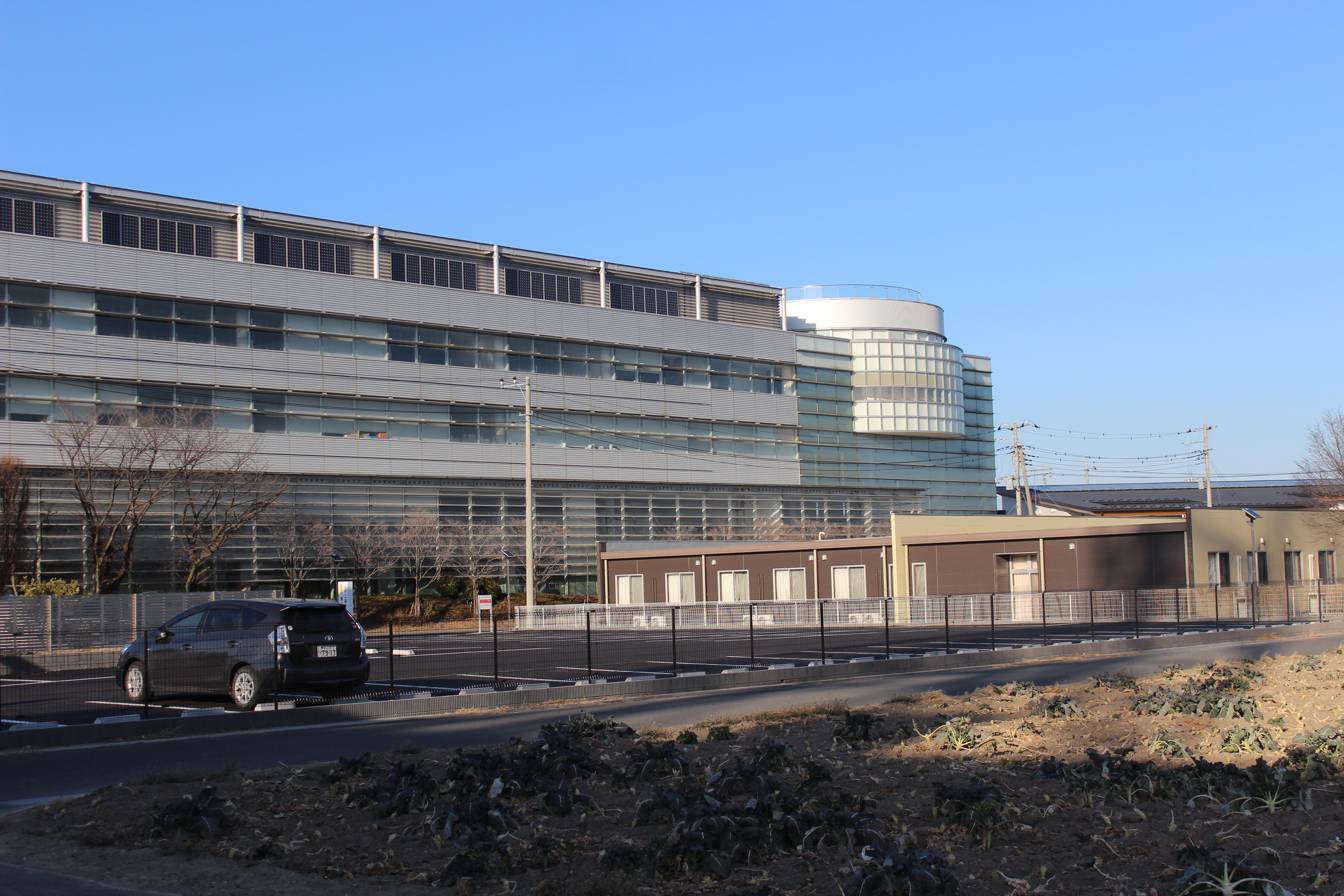
- Kamisato Town Hall

- Flag Seal

- Location of Kamisato in Saitama Prefecture (in yellow)

- Coordinates: 36°15′5.9″N 139°8′41.1″E
- Country: Japan
- Region: Kantō
- Prefecture: Saitama
- District: Kodama

Area
  - Total: 29.18 km^{2} (11.27 sq mi)

Population (March 2021)
  - Total: 30,836
  - Density: 1,057/km^{2} (2,737/sq mi)
- Time zone: UTC+9 (Japan Standard Time)
- Tree: Yaetsubaki
- Flower: Salvia splendens
- Phone number: 0495-35-1221
- Address: 982 Shichihongi, Kamisato-machi, Kodama-gun, Saitama-ken 369-0392
- Website: Official website

Kamisato (上里町, Kamisato-machi) is a town located in Saitama Prefecture, Japan. As of 1 March 2021, the town had an estimated population of 30,836 in 13,055 households and a population density of 1100 persons per km^{2}. The total area of the town is 29.18 square kilometres (11.27 sq mi).

== Geography ==
Kamisato is located on the extreme northwestern border of Saitama Prefecture, separated from Gunma Prefecture by the Kanna River, and isolated from the remainder of Saitama by the Chichibu Mountains.

=== Surrounding municipalities ===
- Gunma Prefecture
  - Fujioka
  - Takasaki
  - Tamamura
- Saitama Prefecture
  - Honjō
  - Kamikawa

=== Climate ===
Kamisato has a humid subtropical climate (Köppen Cfa) characterized by warm summers and cool winters with light to no snowfall. The average annual temperature in Kamisato is 12.6 °C. The average annual rainfall is 1532 mm with September as the wettest month. The temperatures are highest on average in August, at around 24.0 °C, and lowest in January, at around 1.3 °C.

== Demographics ==
Per Japanese census data, the population of Kamisato has recently plateaued after a long period of growth.

Historical population
Year	Pop.	±%
1920	12,586	—
1930	13,264	+5.4%
1940	13,418	+1.2%
1950	17,056	+27.1%
1960	15,489	−9.2%
1970	15,652	+1.1%
1980	19,700	+25.9%
1990	24,626	+25.0%
2000	30,126	+22.3%
2010	30,998	+2.9%
2020	30,343	−2.1%

== History ==
The area of Kamisato was part of ancient Musashi Province. The villages of Jimbohara, Kami, Shichihongi and Nagahata were created within Kodama District with the establishment of the modern municipalities system on April 1, 1889. Kamisato village was created on May 3, 1954, by the merger of these four villages. Kamisato was elevated to town status on November 3, 1971.

== Government ==
Kamisato has a mayor-council form of government with a directly elected mayor and a unicameral town council of 14 members. Kamisato, together with the city of Honjō and town of Kamikawa, contributes two members to the Saitama Prefectural Assembly. In terms of national politics, the town is part of Saitama 11th district of the lower house of the Diet of Japan.

== Economy ==
Kamisato has a large industrial park in the southeastern corner; however, many people commute to neighboring Takasaki or Fujioka.

== Education ==
Kamisato has five public elementary schools and two public middle schools operated by the town government. The town does not have a high school.

There is also an international school, the Instituto Educacional TS Recreação Brazilian school.

== Transportation ==
=== Railway ===
JR East – Takasaki Line

- Jimbohara

=== Highway ===
- Kan-etsu Expressway – Kamisato IC
- National Route 17
- National Route 254
