= Tokyo Kasei-Gakuin University =

Private university in Tokyo, Japan

- 東京家政学院大学
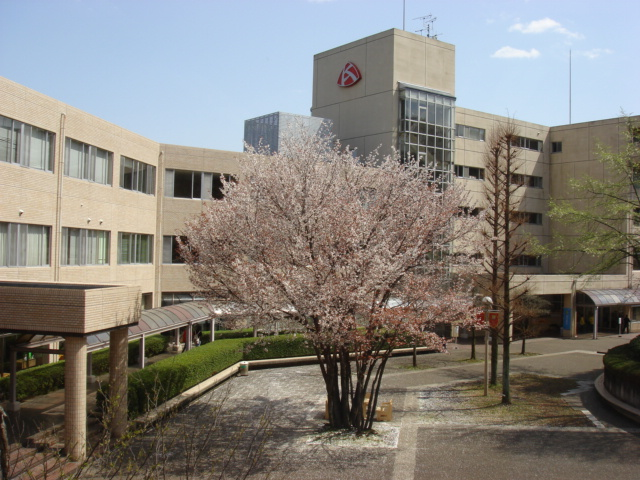
- Tokyo Kasei-Gakuin University
- Type: Private university
- Established: 1963
- Location: Chiyoda, Tokyo, Japan
- Campus: Chiyoda Sanbanchō Campus 35°41′29.3″N 139°44′32″E Machida Campus 35°36′32.4″N 139°18′42.4″E
- Website: http://www.kasei-gakuin.ac.jp/index.shtml

Tokyo Kasei Gakuin University (東京家政学院大学, Tōkyō kasei gakuin daigaku) is a private university in Chiyoda, Tokyo, Japan, established in 1963.

The university only accepts female students at undergraduate level, although male students may be admitted to graduate programs.

== History ==
The school has a branch campus in Machida, Tokyo. The predecessor of the school was founded in 1925.

Though the two share the same historical roots (and website), this school and Tokyo Kasei-Gakuin Junior College are distinct institutions.

In the 1990s, the Tsukuba Gakuin University was a women's university named as a branch of the Tokyo Kasei Gakuin.
