= Kobe Yamate University =

Higher education institution in Kobe, Japan

Coordinates: 34°41′38″N 135°10′42″E

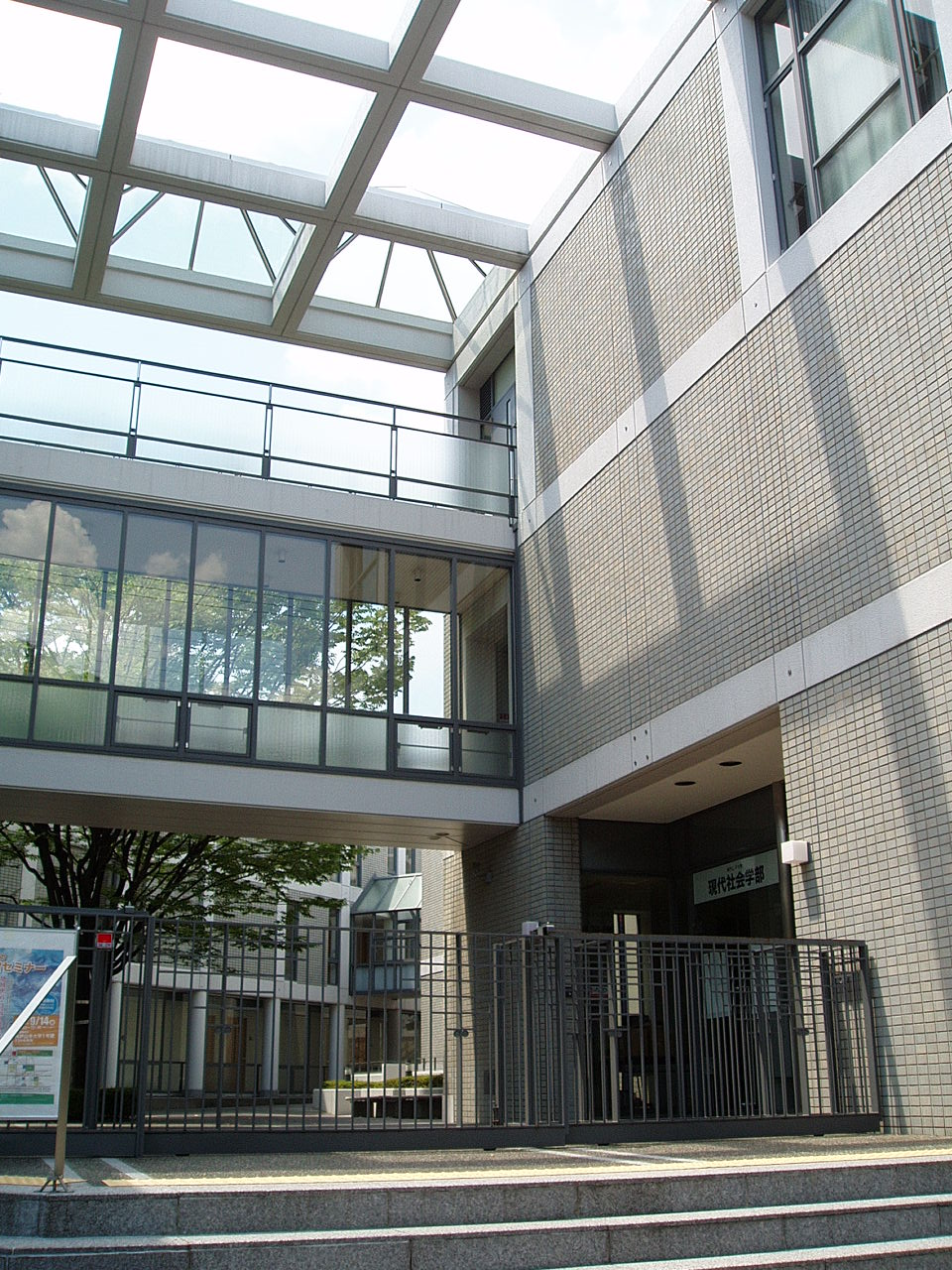
Building #3

Kobe Yamate University (神戸山手大学, Kōbe yamate daigaku) is a private university in Chūō-ku, Kobe, Hyōgo, Japan. The campuses are located in central part of Kobe.

== History ==
- 1999 - Founded as a women's college with a department (Department of Environment and Culture, Faculty of Humanities).
- 2002 - It became coeducational.
- 2006 - Department of Urban Exchanges was established.
- 2008 - Faculty of Humanities was changed its name to Faculty of Contemporary Social Studies.
- 2013 - Department of General Social Studies was established in succession to Department of Environment and Culture, and Department of Urban Exchanges.
- 2015 - Department of Tourism was established in succession to School of Tourism, Kobe Shukugawa Gakuin University.

== Organization ==
=== Faculty (Undergraduate Programs) ===
- Faculty of Contemporary Social Studies
  - Department of Tourism
    - Global Communication
    - Tourism and Culture
    - Tourism Business
  - Department of General Social Studies
    - Media Sociology
    - Psychology
    - Economics and Management Sciences
    - Environmental Studies
    - Interior Architecture
