= Seisen Jogakuin College =

Catholic private women's college in Nagano, Nagano, Japan

Coordinates: 36°41′10.2″N 138°14′10.5″E

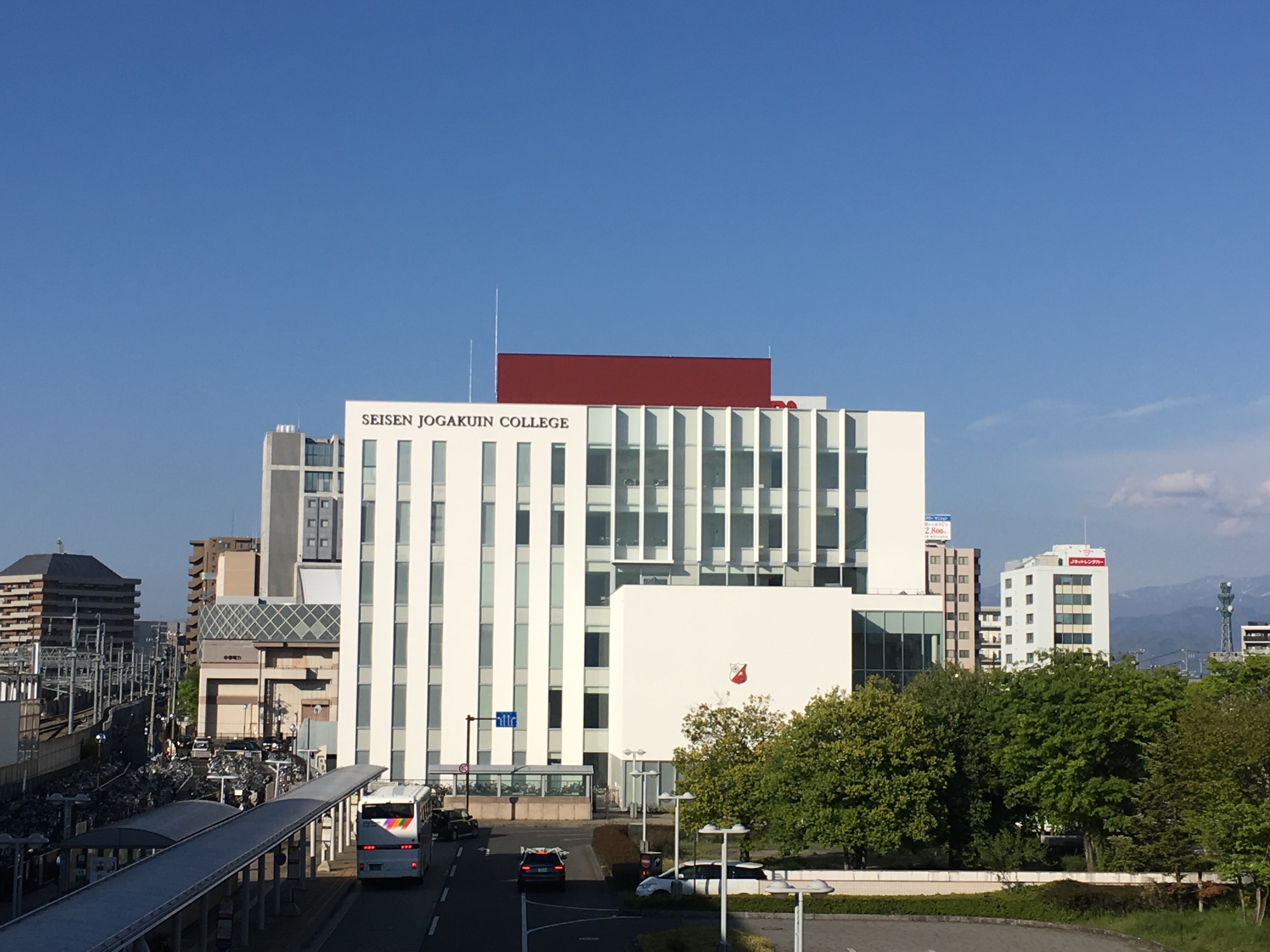
Seisen Jogakuin College at Nagano Station, East Exit

Seisen Jogakuin College (清泉女学院大学, Seisen jogakuin daigaku) is a Catholic private women's college in Nagano, Nagano, Japan. The predecessor of the school was founded in 1961, and it was chartered as a university in 2003.

== Degrees ==
The college offers a 4-year degree in the Faculty of Human Studies, as well as 2-year degrees in either the Department of Early Childhood Education or the Department of International Communication.

== Campus expansion ==
Since 2016, it has proposed to open a new campus next to the east exit of Nagano Station with a new nursing major. Construction on the new campus began in April 2018.
