= Kobe Pharmaceutical University =

Coordinates: 34°43′59″N 135°17′00″E

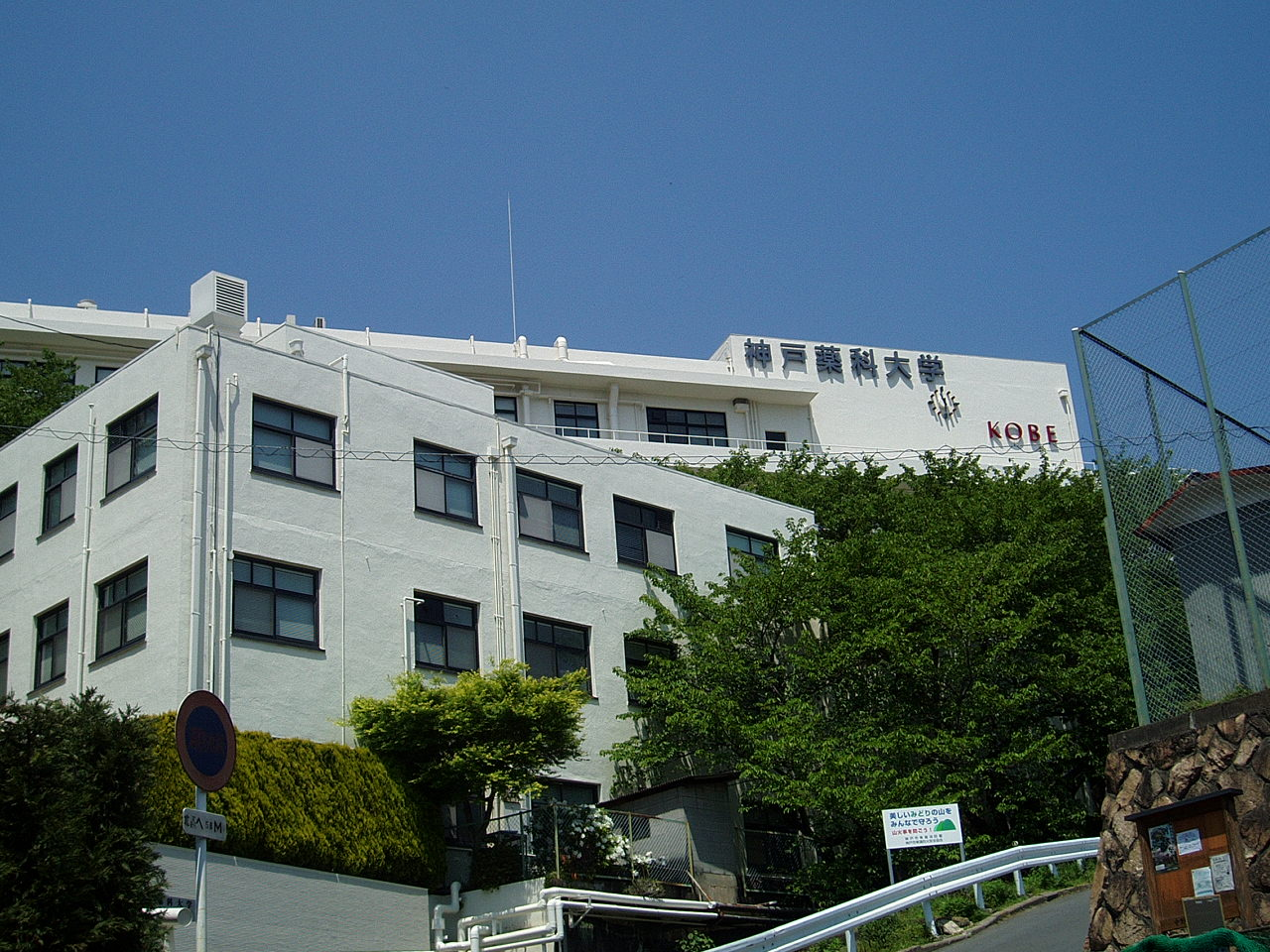
Kobe Pharmaceutical University

Kobe Pharmaceutical University (神戸薬科大学, Kobe yakka daigaku) is a private university in Higashinada, Kobe, Hyōgo, Japan. The predecessor of the school was founded in 1930, and it was chartered as a women's college in 1949. In 1994 the school became coeducational, adopting the present name.
