= Gifu Women's University =

Private university in Gifu Prefecture, Japan

Coordinates: 35°30′1.2″N 136°48′26.6″E

Gifu Women's University 岐阜女子大学
- Gifu Joshi Daigaku
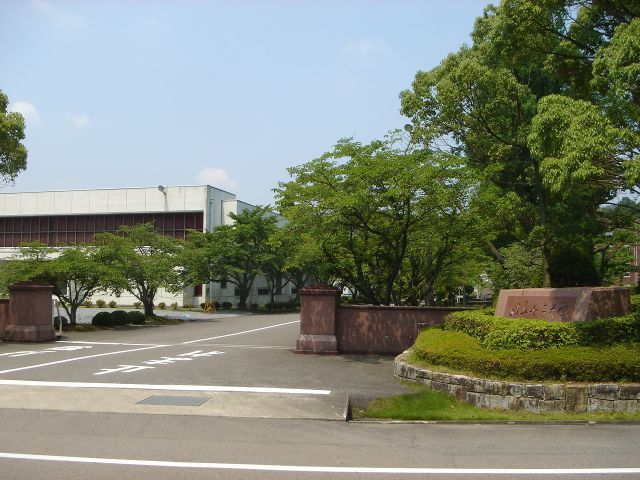
- Type: Public university
- Established: 1968
- Location: Gifu, Gifu Prefecture, Japan
- Website: Official website

Gifu Women's University (岐阜女子大学, Gifu Joshi Daigaku) is a four-year private university in the city of Gifu, Gifu Prefecture, Japan, and was founded in 1968. Its name is abbreviated as Gifu Joshi Dai (岐阜女子大) or GWU.
