= Sawa District =

Rural district in Gunma prefecture, Japan

Location of Sawa District in Gunma Prefecture

Sawa District (佐波郡, Sawa-gun) is a rural district located in Gunma Prefecture, Japan.

As of January 2015, the district had an estimated population of 36,952 and an area of 25.78 km^{2}, with a population density of 1430 people per square kilometer.

== Towns and villages ==
- Tamamura

All of the city of Isesaki and part of the city of Maebashi were formerly part of the district.

== History ==
Sawa District is one of seven districts in the Gunma Prefecture. It was created on April 1, 1896, by the merger of Sai District and Nawa District. At the time of its creation, it was organized into three towns (Isesaki, Sakai and Tamamura) and 13 villages.

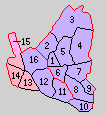
Historic Map of Sawa District: 1. Isesaki, 2. Misato, 3. Akabori, 4. Azuma, 5. Uehasu, 6. Moro, 7. Uneme, 8. Gōshi, 9. Sakai, 10. Shima, 11.Toyouke, 12.Nawa, 13. Shibane, 14. Tamamura, 15. Jōyō, 16. Miyagō

- 1940, September 13 – Uehasu and Moro villages annexed by Isesaki, which was raised to city status
- 1955, January 10 – Isesaki annexed Misato village
- 1955, March 1 – Sakai annexed Uneme, Gōshi and Shima villages
- 1955, March 25 – Isesaki annexed Nawa, Toyouke and Miyagō villages
- 1955, April 20 – Tamamura annexed Shibane village
- 1957, August 1 - Sakai annexed the villages of Jōyō
- 1986, October 1 – Akabori village was raised to town status
- 2005, January 1 – Akabori, Sakai towns and Azuma village are annexed by Isesaki.
