= Kanna, Gunma =

Kanna 神流町
- Town
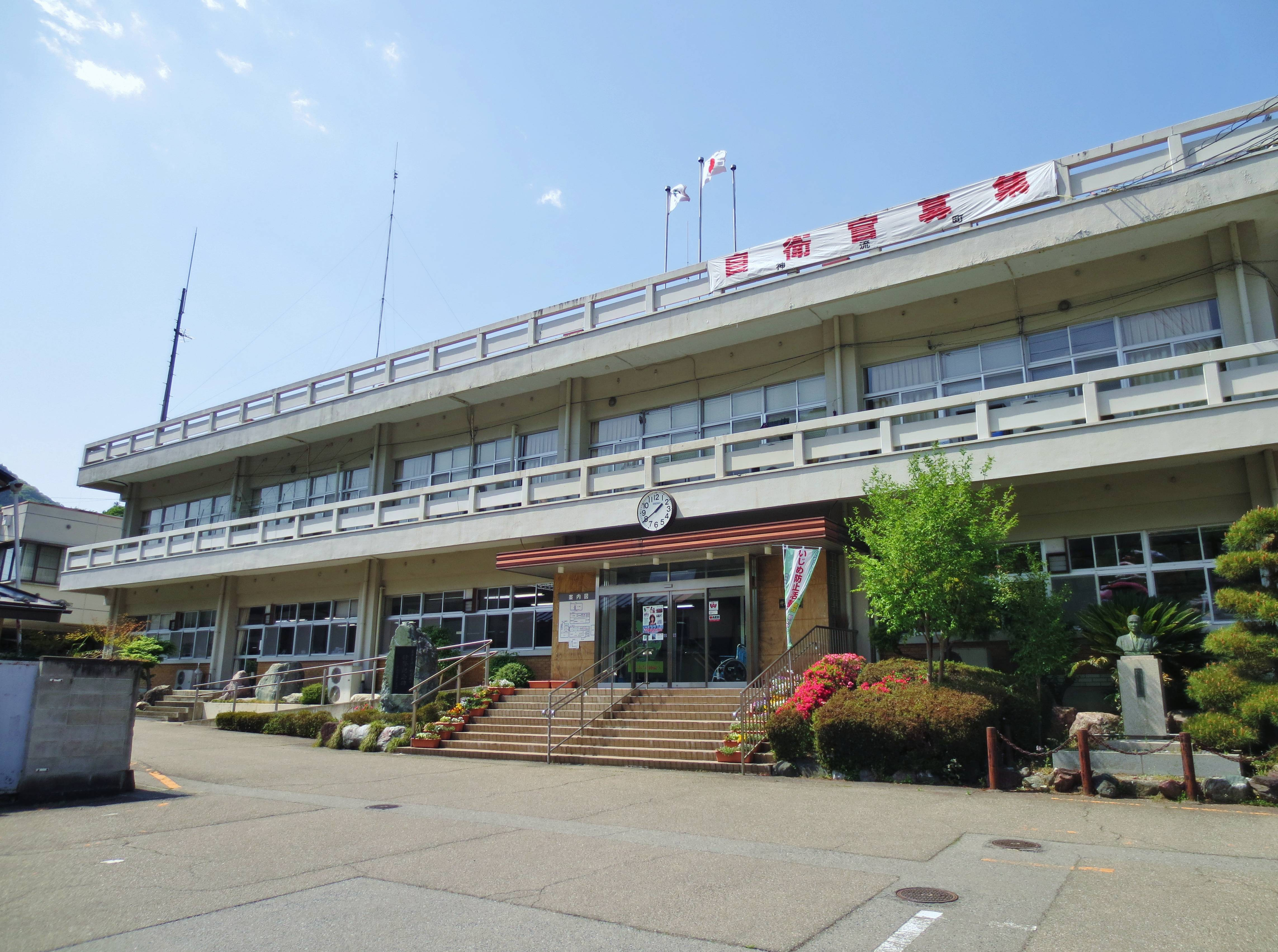
- Kanna town office

- Flag Seal

- Location of Kanna in Gunma Prefecture

- Coordinates: 36°6′57.3″N 138°55′11″E
- Country: Japan
- Region: Kantō
- Prefecture: Gunma
- District: Tano

Area
  - Total: 114.6 km^{2} (44.2 sq mi)

Population (October 1, 2020)
  - Total: 1,645
  - Density: 14.35/km^{2} (37.18/sq mi)
- Time zone: UTC+9 (Japan Standard Time)
- Phone number: 0274-57-2111
- Address: 90-6 Manba, Kanna-machi, Tano-gun, Gunma-ken 370-1592
- Climate: Cfa
- Website: Official website
- Symbols
- Bird: Japanese white-eye
- Flower: Rhododendron dilatatum
- Tree: Zelkova serrata

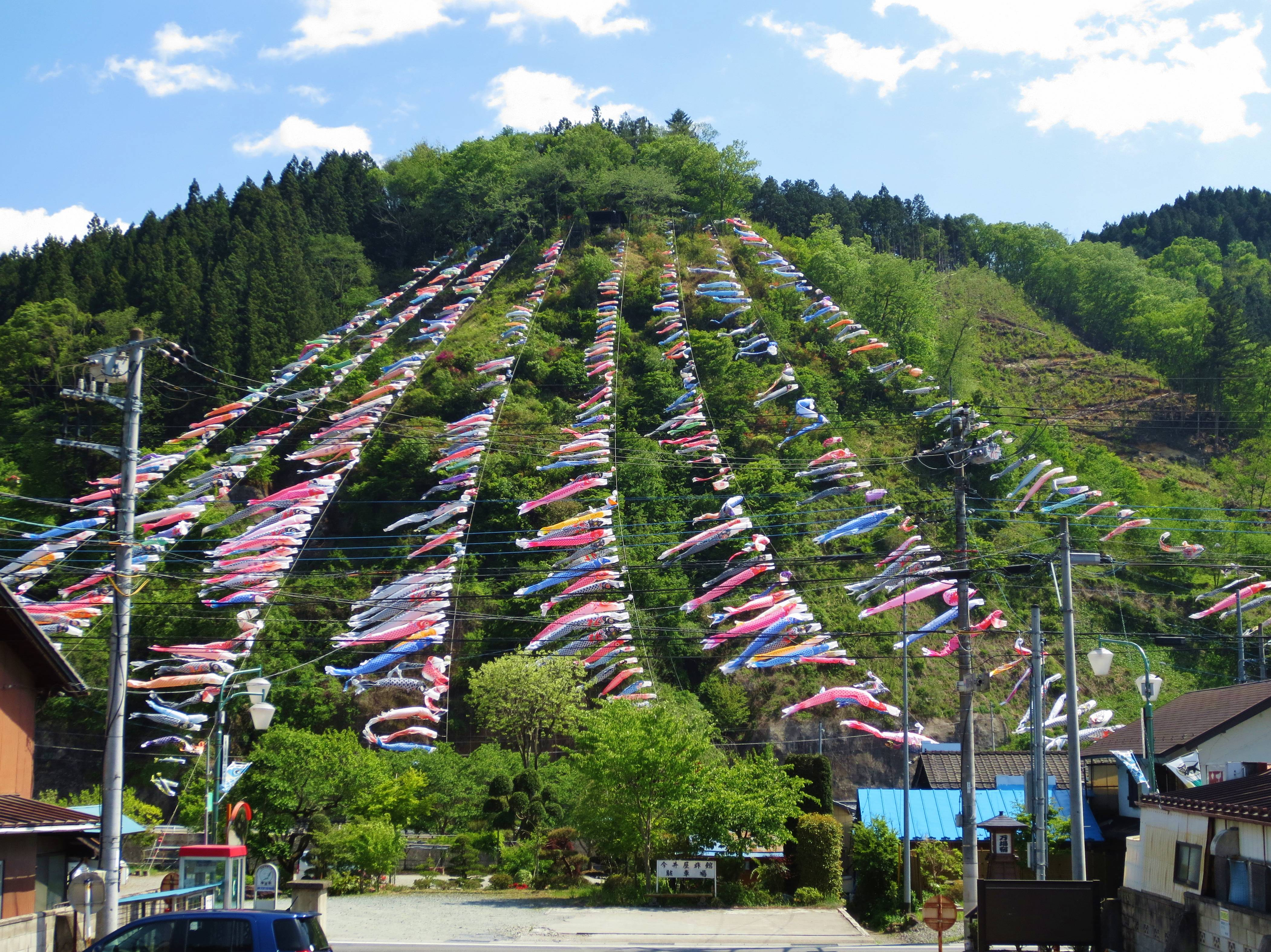
Kanna Koinobori Festival

Kanna (神流町, Kanna-machi) is a town located in Gunma Prefecture, Japan. As of 1 October 2020, the town had an estimated population of 1,645 and a population density of 14.35 persons per km^{2}. The total area of the town is 114.6 square kilometres (44.2 sq mi). A footprint of Japan's first dinosaurs was discovered in former Nakasato village, now part of Kanna.

== Geography ==
Kanna is located in the mountainous southwestern portion of Gunma Prefecture, bordered by Saitama Prefecture to the south.

=== Surrounding municipalities ===
Gunma Prefecture

- Fujioka
- Nanmoku
- Shimonita
- Ueno

Saitama Prefecture

- Chichibu
- Ogano

=== Climate ===
Kanna has a humid subtropical climate (Köppen Cfa) characterized by warm summers and cold winters with heavy snowfall. The average annual temperature in Kanna is 10.7 °C. The average annual rainfall is 1195 mm with September as the wettest month. The temperatures are highest on average in August, at around 23.7 °C, and lowest in January, at around -1.7 °C.

Climate data for Kanna (1991−2020 normals, extremes 1977−present)
Month	Jan	Feb	Mar	Apr	May	Jun	Jul	Aug	Sep	Oct	Nov	Dec	Year
Record high °C (°F)	18.3 (64.9)	23.2 (73.8)	24.6 (76.3)	32.7 (90.9)	34.4 (93.9)	36.9 (98.4)	38.7 (101.7)	37.3 (99.1)	37.5 (99.5)	31.6 (88.9)	23.8 (74.8)	21.9 (71.4)	38.7 (101.7)
Mean daily maximum °C (°F)	7.6 (45.7)	8.7 (47.7)	12.1 (53.8)	17.6 (63.7)	22.2 (72.0)	24.5 (76.1)	28.2 (82.8)	29.3 (84.7)	24.9 (76.8)	19.4 (66.9)	14.6 (58.3)	9.9 (49.8)	18.3 (64.9)
Daily mean °C (°F)	0.6 (33.1)	1.7 (35.1)	5.3 (41.5)	10.8 (51.4)	15.8 (60.4)	19.3 (66.7)	23.0 (73.4)	23.8 (74.8)	19.8 (67.6)	13.9 (57.0)	7.6 (45.7)	2.6 (36.7)	12.0 (53.6)
Mean daily minimum °C (°F)	−4.1 (24.6)	−3.5 (25.7)	−0.3 (31.5)	4.6 (40.3)	10.1 (50.2)	15.1 (59.2)	19.3 (66.7)	20.1 (68.2)	16.3 (61.3)	10.0 (50.0)	2.9 (37.2)	−2.0 (28.4)	7.4 (45.3)
Record low °C (°F)	−10.3 (13.5)	−11.6 (11.1)	−9.0 (15.8)	−4.5 (23.9)	0.0 (32.0)	6.0 (42.8)	12.1 (53.8)	11.4 (52.5)	6.0 (42.8)	−0.3 (31.5)	−4.7 (23.5)	−8.2 (17.2)	−11.6 (11.1)
Average precipitation mm (inches)	32.1 (1.26)	24.7 (0.97)	58.9 (2.32)	74.2 (2.92)	97.1 (3.82)	143.4 (5.65)	181.5 (7.15)	180.9 (7.12)	224.3 (8.83)	173.5 (6.83)	37.4 (1.47)	22.4 (0.88)	1,250.2 (49.22)
Average precipitation days (≥ 1.0 mm)	3.7	3.7	7.8	8.3	10.1	13.6	15.2	12.7	12.6	9.7	5.2	3.7	106.3
Mean monthly sunshine hours	213.7	209.0	212.7	211.5	203.6	137.4	147.1	159.2	122.9	142.0	182.0	193.7	2,134.8
Source: JMA

== Demographics ==
Per Japanese census data, the town's population has dropped precipitously from its 1950 peak, with the remaining population having the second oldest median age in Japan after Nanmoku, Gunma (61.5% over the age or 65). The town is thus classified as a genkai shūraku.

Historical population
Year	Pop.	±%
1920	8,832	—
1930	8,706	−1.4%
1940	8,352	−4.1%
1950	9,881	+18.3%
1960	8,733	−11.6%
1970	6,878	−21.2%
1980	5,469	−20.5%
1990	4,154	−24.0%
2000	3,210	−22.7%
2010	2,352	−26.7%
2020	1,645	−30.1%

== History ==
During the Edo period, the area of present-day Kanna was part of the tenryō territory administered directly by the Tokugawa shogunate in Kōzuke Province.

Kamikawa village and Nakasato village were established within Minamikanra District, Gunma Prefecture on April 1, 1889, with the creation of the modern municipalities system after the Meiji Restoration. In 1896 Minamikanra District was united with Midono and Tago Districts to create Tano District. Kamikawa village was elevated to town status in 1926 and renamed Manba town. On April 1, 2003, Manba and Nakasato merged, forming the town of Kanna.

== Government ==
Kanna has a mayor-council form of government with a directly elected mayor and a unicameral town council of 8 members. Kanna, together with the city of Fujioka and village of Ueno contributes two members to the Gunma Prefectural Assembly. In terms of national politics, the town is part of Gunma 4th district of the lower house of the Diet of Japan.

== Economy ==
The economy of Kanna is heavily dependent on agriculture.

== Education ==
Kanna has one public elementary school and one public middle school operated by the town government. The town has one public high school operated by the Gunma Prefectural Board of Education.

== Transportation ==
=== Railway ===
Kanna does not have any passenger railway service.

=== Highway ===
- National Route 299
- National Route 462

== Local attractions ==
- Kanna Dinosaur Center
- Roadside Station Manba no Sato
- Ryūshōji (A temple famed for its cherry blossoms)
- Sazanamiiwa (The location of the dinosaur footprint)
