= Kannagawa Hydropower Plant =

Dam in Nagano and Gunma Prefectures, Japan

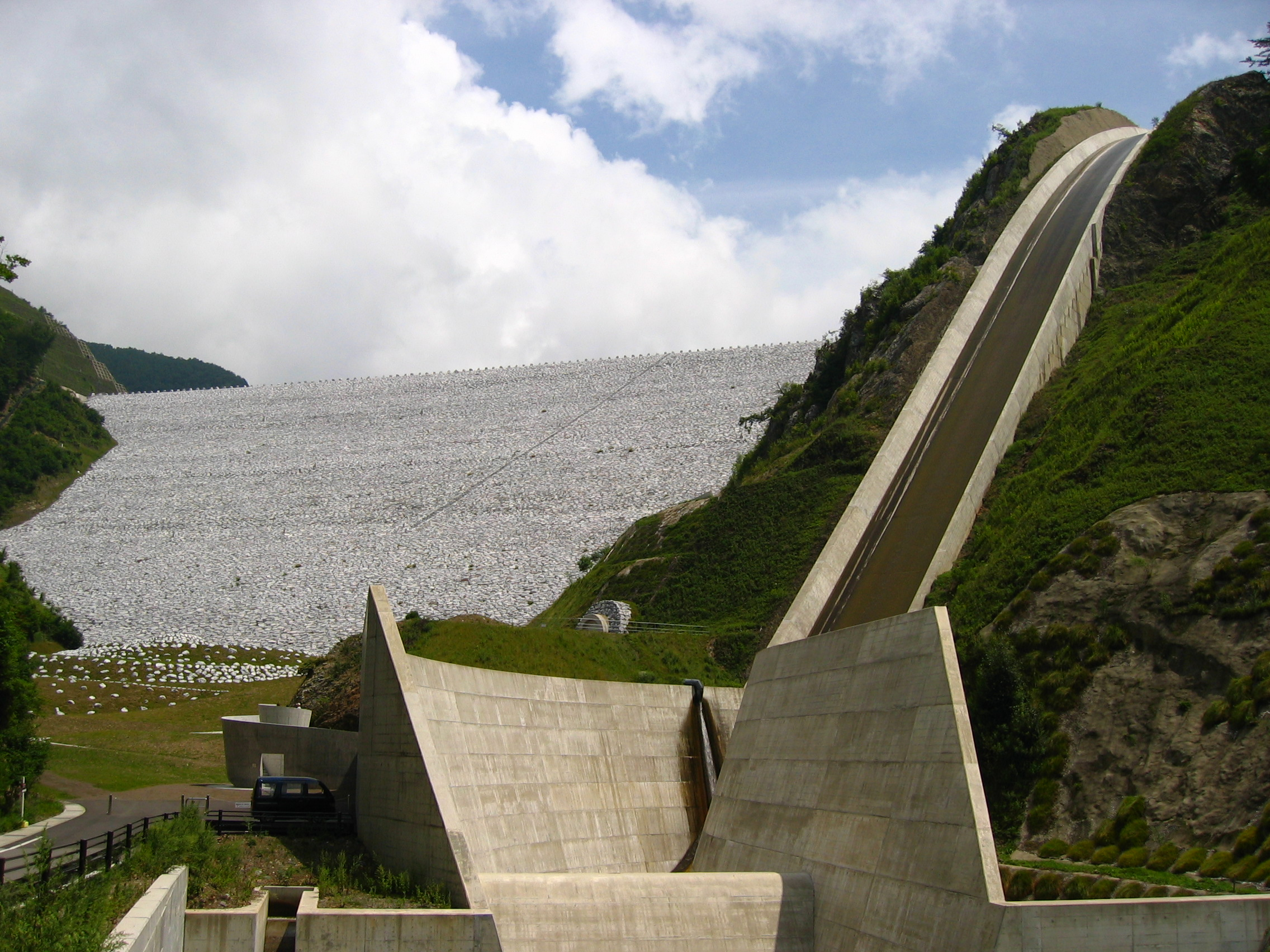
- The upper Minamiaiki Dam
- Country: Japan
- Location: Nagano Prefecture and Gunma Prefecture
- Coordinates: 36°00′18″N 138°39′09″E
- Status: In partial operation
- Opening date: Unit 1: 2005; Unit 2: 2012; Units 3-6: 2032
- Owner(s): Tokyo Electric Power Company

Upper reservoir
- Creates: Minamiaiki Reservoir
- Total capacity: 19,170,000 m^{3} (15,540 acre⋅ft)

Lower reservoir
- Creates: Ueno Reservoir
- Total capacity: 18,400,000 m^{3} (14,900 acre⋅ft)

Power Station
- Hydraulic head: 653 m (2,142 ft)
- Pump-generators: Francis pump turbine Operational: 2 x 470 MW; Under constr.: 4 x 470 MW
- Installed capacity: 2,820 MW (3,780,000 hp)

The Kannagawa Hydropower Plant (神流川発電所) is an under construction pumped-storage hydroelectric power plant near Minamiaiki in Nagano Prefecture and Ueno in Gunma Prefecture, Japan. The power plant utilizes the Minamiaiki River along with an upper and lower reservoir created by two dams, the upper Minamiaiki Dam and the lower Ueno Dam. The power station in between the two dams will contain six 470 megawatts (630,000 hp) pump-generators for a total installed capacity of 2,820 megawatts (3,780,000 hp). Unit 1 commenced commercial operation in 2005 and Unit 2 in 2012. When completed, the plant will have the third-largest (after Fengning Pumped Storage Power Station and Bath County Pumped Storage Station) pumped-storage power capacity in the world.

== Construction ==
In July 1993, the Kannagawa Hydropower Field Survey Office was initiated and in July 1995, the power plant was approved by the Electric Power Development Coordination Council. In May 1997, construction on the project began and by October 2003, the area behind the Ueno Dam was being inundated with water and the next year, the Minamiaiki Dam's reservoir began to fill as well. Both dams were completed and the upper reservoir was filled by 2004. The first generator was commissioned on 22 December 2005 and the second on 7 June 2012. The remaining units 3-6 are scheduled for commissioning by 2032.

== Power station ==
The power station is 1,600 feet (490 m) underground and measures 708 ft (216 m) long, 108 feet (33 m) wide, and 169 feet (52 m) high. It will contain 6 x 470 MW pump generators for a total capacity of 2,820 MW. Water from the upper Minamiaiki Reservoir is transferred through the power house and after producing electricity, it runs to the lower Ueno Reservoir. The pump-generators can then pump water from the lower reservoir back up to the upper reservoir for re-use in hydroelectric power production. The water tunnel connecting the two reservoirs is 3.8 miles (6.1 km) long. The power station also has an effective hydraulic head of 653 metres (2,142 ft) and maximum discharge of 510 cubic metres per second (18,000 cu ft/s).

== Dams ==
The Minamiaiki Dam is located in Nagano Prefecture and is a 136 metres (446 ft) high and 444 metres (1,457 ft) long rock-fill dam. It is made of 7,300,000 cubic metres (9,500,000 cu yd) of material and withholds a 19,170,000 m^{3} (677,000,000 cu ft) reservoir. The Ueno Dam, in Gunma Prefecture, is a 120 metres (390 ft) high and 350 metres (1,150 ft) long concrete-gravity dam. It is made of 720,000 cubic metres (940,000 cu yd) of material and withholds a 18,400,000 m^{3} (650,000,000 cu ft) reservoir.

== See also ==
- List of power stations in Japan
- Hydroelectricity in Japan
