= Ueno, Gunma =

Ueno 上野村
- Village
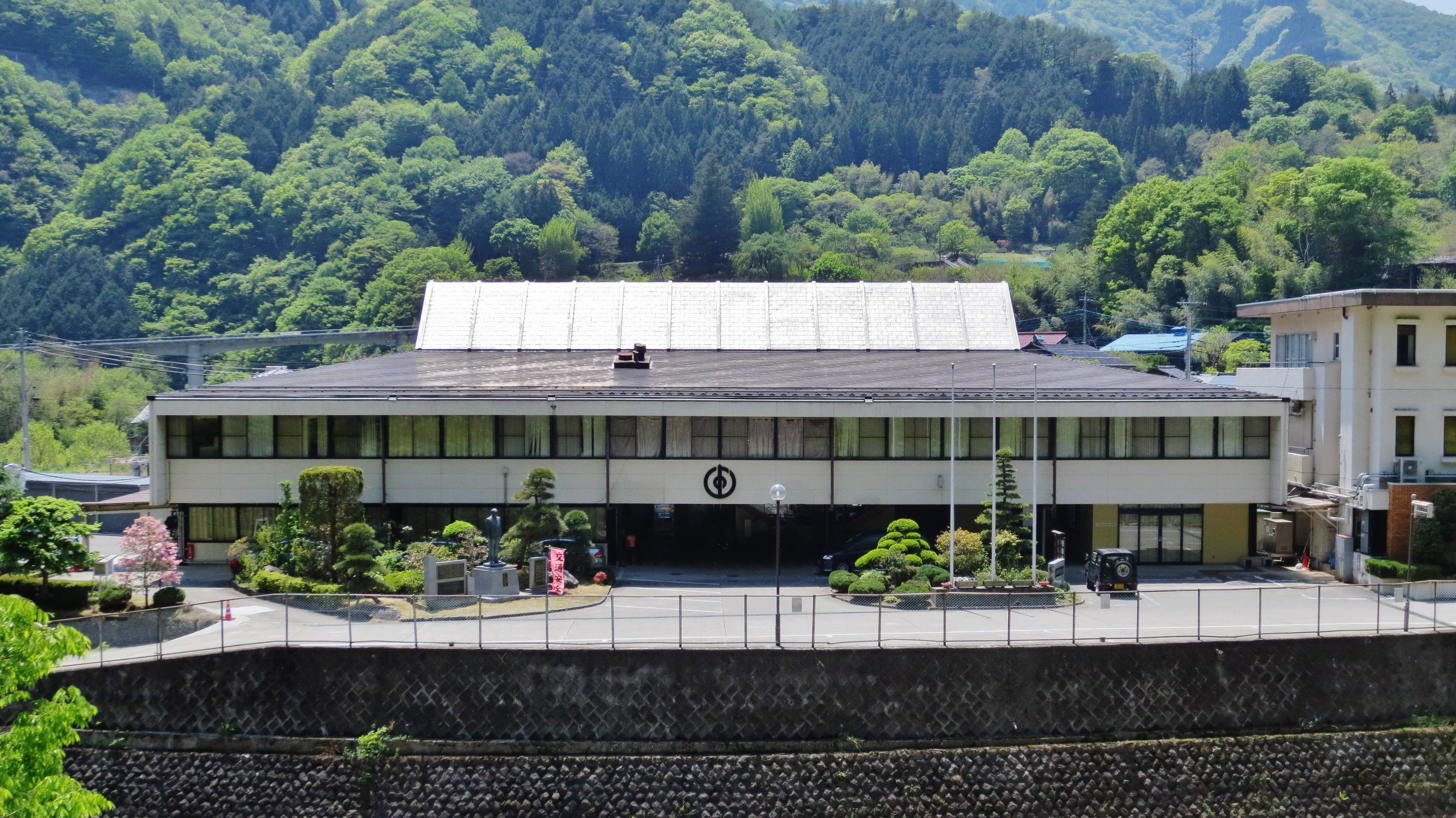
- Ueno village office

- Flag Seal

- Location of Ueno in Gunma Prefecture

- Coordinates: 36°4′59.5″N 138°46′38.3″E
- Country: Japan
- Region: Kantō
- Prefecture: Gunma
- District: Tano

Area
  - Total: 181.85 km^{2} (70.21 sq mi)

Population (October 1, 2020)
  - Total: 1,149
  - Density: 6.318/km^{2} (16.36/sq mi)
- Time zone: UTC+9 (Japan Standard Time)
- Phone number: 0274-59-2111
- Address: 11 Kawawa, Ueno-mura, Tano-gun, Gunma-ken 370–1614
- Website: Official website

Ueno (上野村, Ueno-mura) is a village located in Gunma Prefecture, Japan. As of 1 October 2020, the village had an estimated population of 1,149 in 571 households, and a population density of 6.3 persons per km^{2}. The total area of the village is 181.85 square kilometres (70.21 sq mi). The village has the lowest population density of any municipality in Japan.

== Geography ==
Ueno is located in the extreme mountainous southwestern portion of Gunma Prefecture, bordered by Saitama Prefecture to the south and Nagano Prefecture to the west.

- Mountains
  - Mount Suwa
  - Mount Osutaka (1639m)
  - Mount Takamagahara (1979m)
- Rivers
  - Kanna River

=== Surrounding municipalities ===
Gunma Prefecture

- Kanna
- Nanmoku

Nagano Prefecture

- Kawakami
- Kitaaiki
- Minamiaiki
- Sakuho

Saitama Prefecture

- Chichibu
- Ogano

=== Climate ===
Ueno has a humid continental climate (Köppen Dfb) characterized by warm summers and cold winters with heavy snowfall. The average annual temperature in Ueno is 8.0 °C. The average annual rainfall is 1479 mm with September as the wettest month. The temperatures are highest on average in August, at around 20.6 °C, and lowest in January, at around -4.2 °C.

== Demographics ==
Per Japanese census data, the population of Ueno peaked in the 1950s and is now only a quarter of what it was a century ago.

Historical population
Year	Pop.	±%
1920	4,423	—
1930	3,895	−11.9%
1940	3,887	−0.2%
1950	4,721	+21.5%
1960	4,299	−8.9%
1970	2,996	−30.3%
1980	2,309	−22.9%
1990	1,711	−25.9%
2000	2,285	+33.5%
2010	1,306	−42.8%
2020	1,128	−13.6%

== History ==
During the Edo period, the area of present-day Ueno was part of the tenryō territory administered directly by the Tokugawa shogunate in Kōzuke Province.

Ueno village was established within Minamikanra District, Gunma Prefecture on April 1, 1889, with the creation of the modern municipalities system after the Meiji Restoration. In 1896, Minamikanra District was united with Midono and Tago Districts to create Tano District. On August 12, 1985, Japan Air Lines Flight 123, heading from Haneda Airport to Itami Airport, crashed into an area within the Ueno Village limits, killing 520 people in the world's deadliest single-aircraft aviation accident. Local police and fire rescue units as well as the Ueno Village Hunters Association became involved in the response efforts; four passengers survived.

The village rejected the central's governments directives on Municipal mergers and dissolutions in Japan. Despite its depopulation, revenue from Ueno Dam and the Tokyo Electric Kannagawa Power Station give the local government the highest financial strength index in the prefecture.

== Government ==
Ueno has a mayor-council form of government with a directly elected mayor and a unicameral town council of eight members. Ueno, together with the city of Fujioka and village of Ueno contributes two members to the Gunma Prefectural Assembly. In terms of national politics, the town is part of Gunma 4th district of the lower house of the Diet of Japan.

== Economy ==
The economy of Ueno is heavily dependent on agriculture and forestry.

== Education ==
Ueno has one public elementary school, Ueno Elementary School (上野村立上野小学校), and one public junior high school, Ueno Junior High School (上野村立上野中学校), operated by the village government. The village does not have a high school.

== Transportation ==
=== Railway ===
Ueno does not have any passenger railway service.

=== Bus ===
Ueno Village Bus comes from Joshin Electric Railway Shimonita Station, and Nippon Chuo Bus Okutano Line comes from JR East Shinmachi Station (Gunma)

=== Highway ===
- National Route 299
- National Route 462

== International relations ==
- Zhuolan, Miaoli, Taiwan

== Local attractions ==
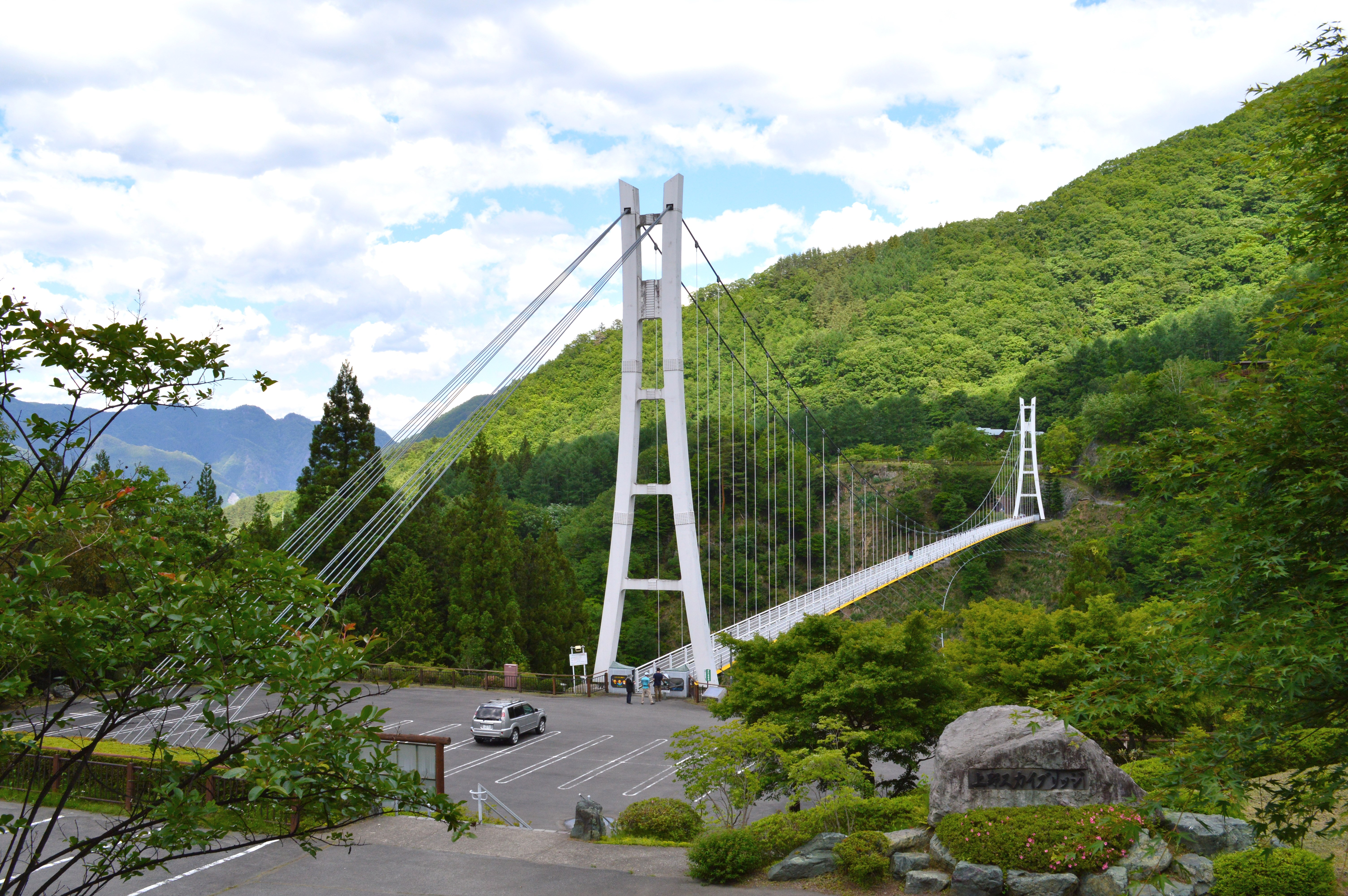
Sky bridge at Ueno, Gunma

- Shionosawa Onsen
- Ueno Dam
- Ueno Sky Bridge - The Ueno skybridge is a 225 metre long pedestrian suspension bridge. At a height of 90 metres, it offers scenic views.
