= Mount Ogura =

Mountain in Nagano Prefecture, Japan

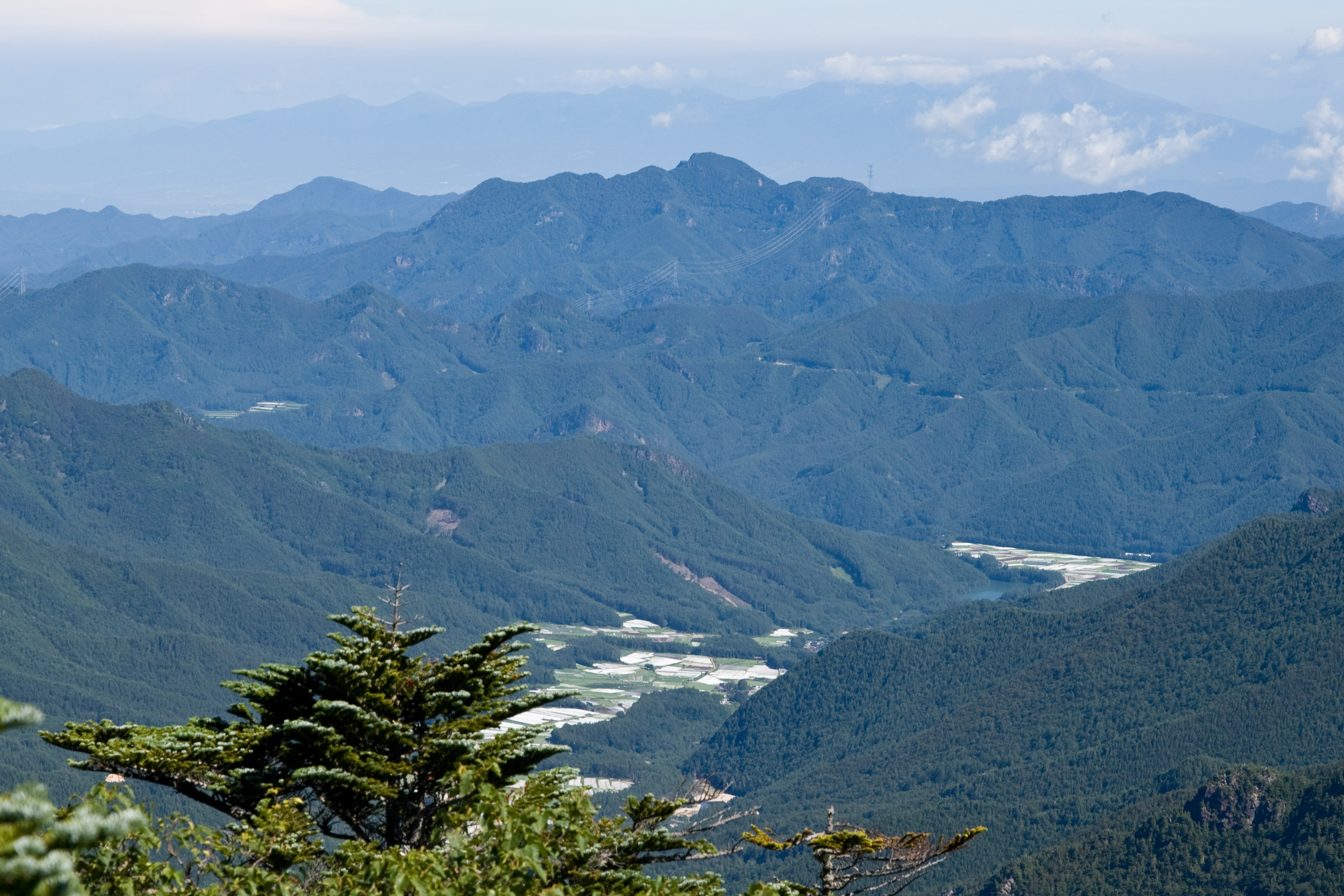
- A view from Mt. Kitaokusenjo

Highest point
- Elevation: 2,112 m (6,929 ft)
- Coordinates: 36°2′2.7″N 138°36′24.5″E

Naming
- Native name: 御座山 (Japanese)
- English translation: mountain on which a god stays

Geography
- Location within Japan
- Location: Nagano, Japan
- Parent range: Chichibu Mountains

Mount Ogura (御座山, Ogura-san) is a mountain located between Kitaaiki and Minamiaiki Villages, Minamisaku District, Nagano Prefecture, Japan. With its summit being 2,112 meters above sea level, it is the tallest mountain in Minamiaiki, Nagano.

It is known for the Japanese rhododendron flowers (shakunage in Japanese) that come into full bloom in early to mid-June.

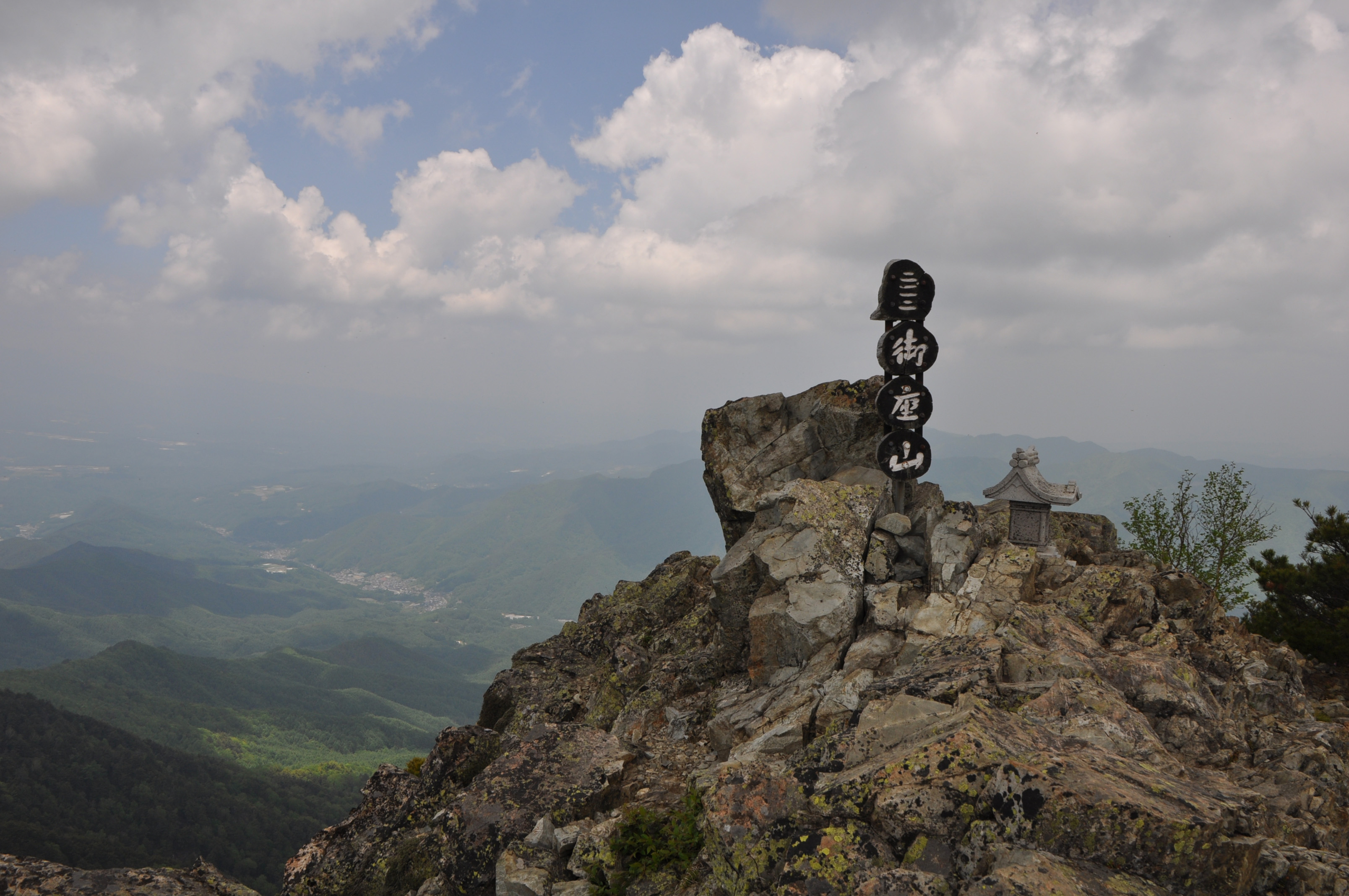
Mount Ogura at its summit

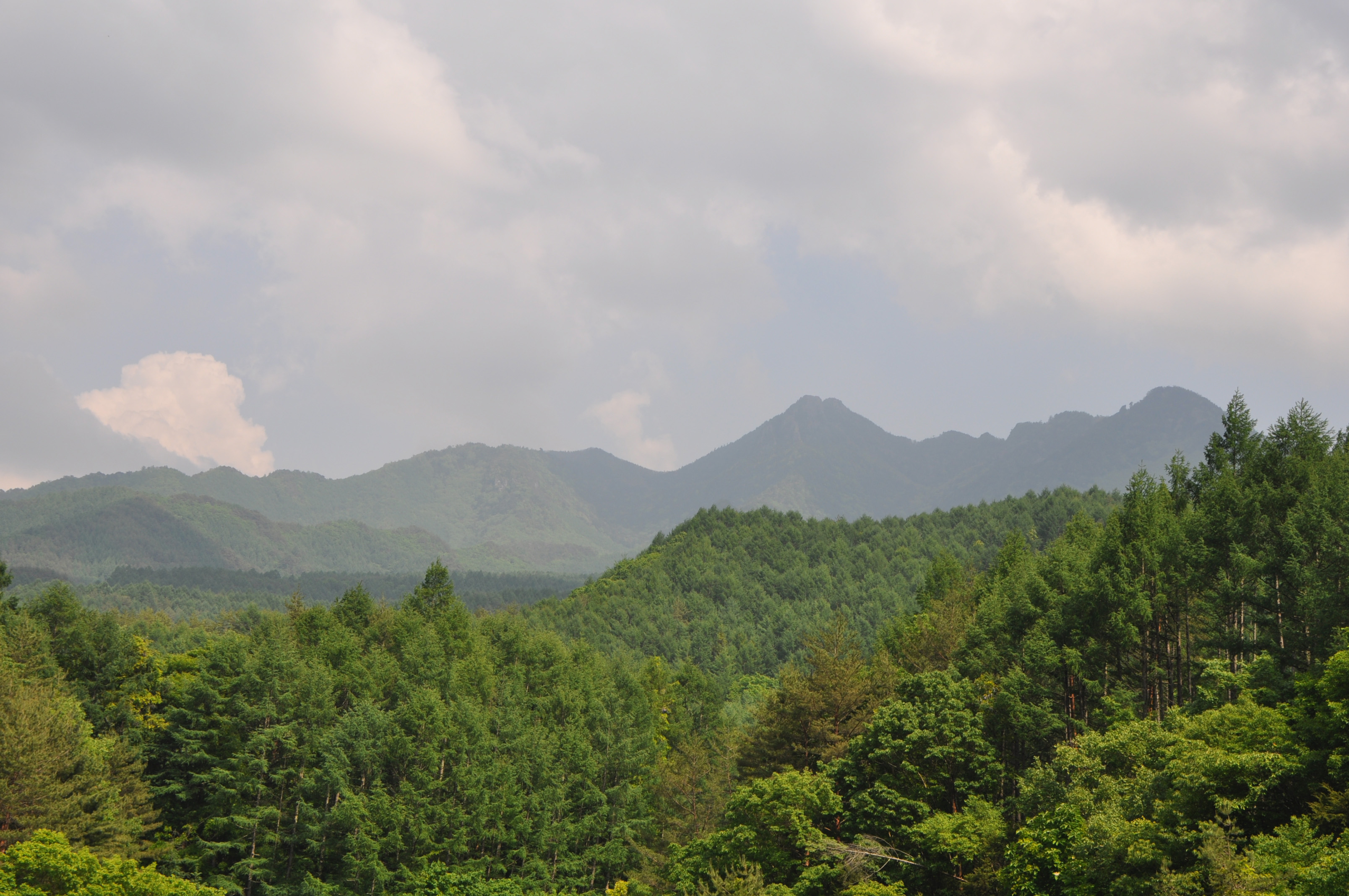
Mount Ogura as seen from Kitaaiki, Nagano Prefecture
