= Minamiaiki Dam =

Dam in Minamiaiki, Japan

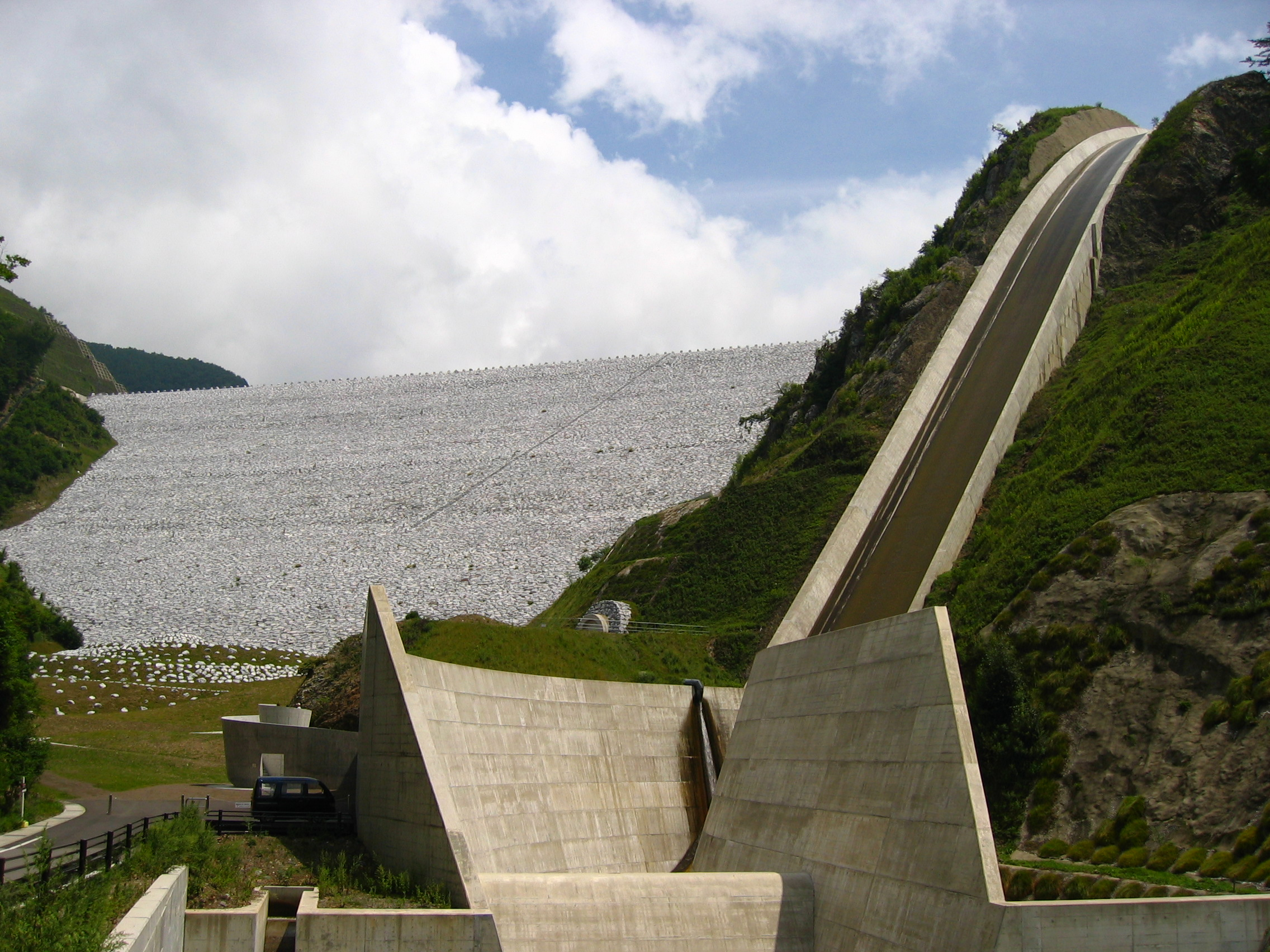
- Interactive map of Minamiaiki Dam
- Location: Minamiaiki, Nagano National Forest
- Coordinates: 36°00′16″N 138°39′13″E
- Construction began: 1995
- Opening date: 2005

Dam and spillways
- Height: 136 m
- Length: 444 m

Reservoir
- Total capacity: 19,170,000 m^{3}
- Catchment area: 6.2 km^{2}

The Minamiaiki Dam is a rock-fill embankment dam on the Minamiaiki River in Minamiaiki, Nagano Prefecture, Japan. Together with the Ueno Dam, it provides water for the Kannagawa Hydropower Plant owned by the Tokyo Electric Power Company. The Minamiaiki dam is the higher of the two dams. When completed, the station will have the largest power output of any pump-storage power plant in the world at around 2.82 GW. Since 2005, Unit 1, with an installed capacity of 470 MW, is in commercial operation. Commercial operation of Unit 2 is planned in 2012, commercial operation of all six units as late as 2020.
