= Tochibaraiwakage ruins =

Archaeological site in Japan

Tochibaraiwakage Ruins
- 栃原岩陰遺跡 (Japanese)
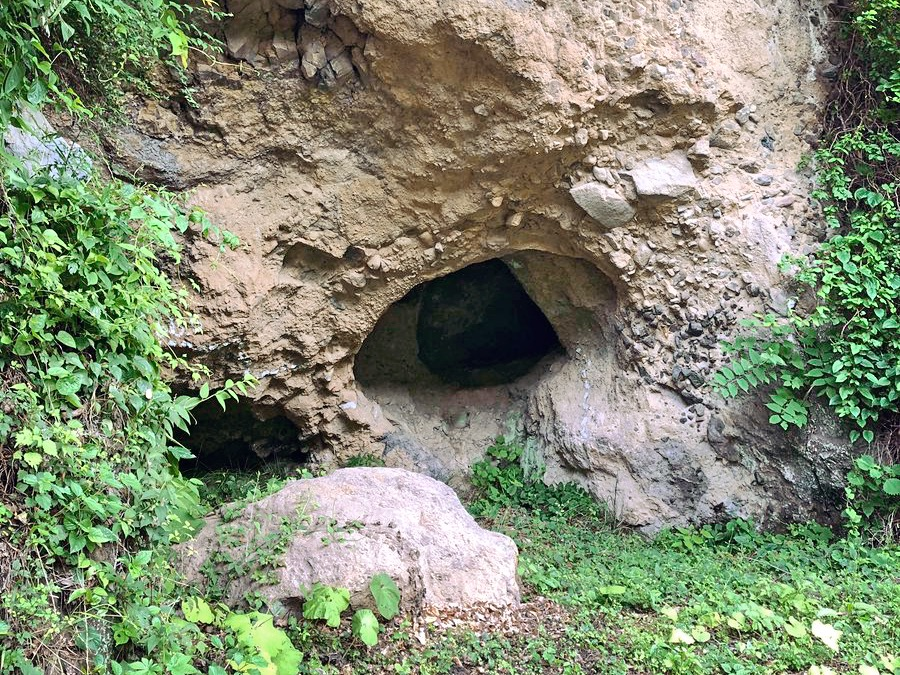
- Tochibaraiwakage cave dwelling site

- Tochiharaiwakage Tochibaraiwakage ruins (Japan)
- 36°3′43.2″N 138°30′53.2″E
- Type: settlement
- Periods: Jōmon period
- Location: Kitaaiki, Nagano, Japan
- Region: Chūbu region

Site notes
- Excavation dates: 1965-1987
- Discovered: 1965
- Public access: None

The Tochibaraiwakage ruins (栃原岩陰遺跡, Tochibaraiwakage iseki) is an archaeological site consisting of a cave dwelling in use during the Jōmon period, located in the Tochihara neighborhood of the village of Kitaaiki, Nagano in the Chūbu region of Japan. The site was designated a National Historic Site of Japan in 1987.

== Overview ==
The Tochibaraiwakage cave is located on the right bank of the Aiki River in a mountainous area at an elevation of approximately 960 meters, to the east of Mount Yatsugatake. It consists of three small rock shelters which were discovered in 1965. Each has a height, width and depth of only two to three meters; however, in the Jōmon period they had a width and depth of around eight meters and a height of six meters. The rock shelters face south. As the Aiki River was nearby and the surrounding mountains could provide a rich source of food, these shelters were inhabited for at least a thousand years.

Over the course of 15 archaeological excavations conducted from 1965 to 1987, the site was found to contain more than ten early Jōmon period human remains, mostly those of adults. Jōmon pottery, stone tools, bone or horn vessels, and many bones from food (mammals, reptiles, freshwater fish) were also excavated, as well as preserved fragments of clothing. The site provided a great deal of materials for research in the early Jōmon period, and noteworthy was the sophistication of bone fish hooks and sewing needles indicating an unexpectedly high level of technology. Despite its distance from the sea, some of the bone tools were made from shark teeth, which indicates some form of long distance trade and communications. Another noteworthy find were the remains of two children, aged three and five from their dentation, who had been eating fruit of the Muku tree by the hearth when a rock fall from the ceiling crushed them to death. This was reported as the earliest known accidental death in Japan.

Some of the artifacts uncovered are on display at the Kitaaiki Village Archaeological Museum. Then site is located about eight minutes by car from Koumi Station on the JR East Koumi Line.

== See also ==
- List of Historic Sites of Japan (Nagano)
