= Mount Osutaka =

Mountain in Ueno, Gunma Prefecture, Japan

Coordinates: 36.0159°N 138.688°E

Mount Osutaka (御巣鷹山, Osutaka-yama) is a mountain in Ueno, Gunma Prefecture, Japan. It is 1,639 m (5,377 ft) high.

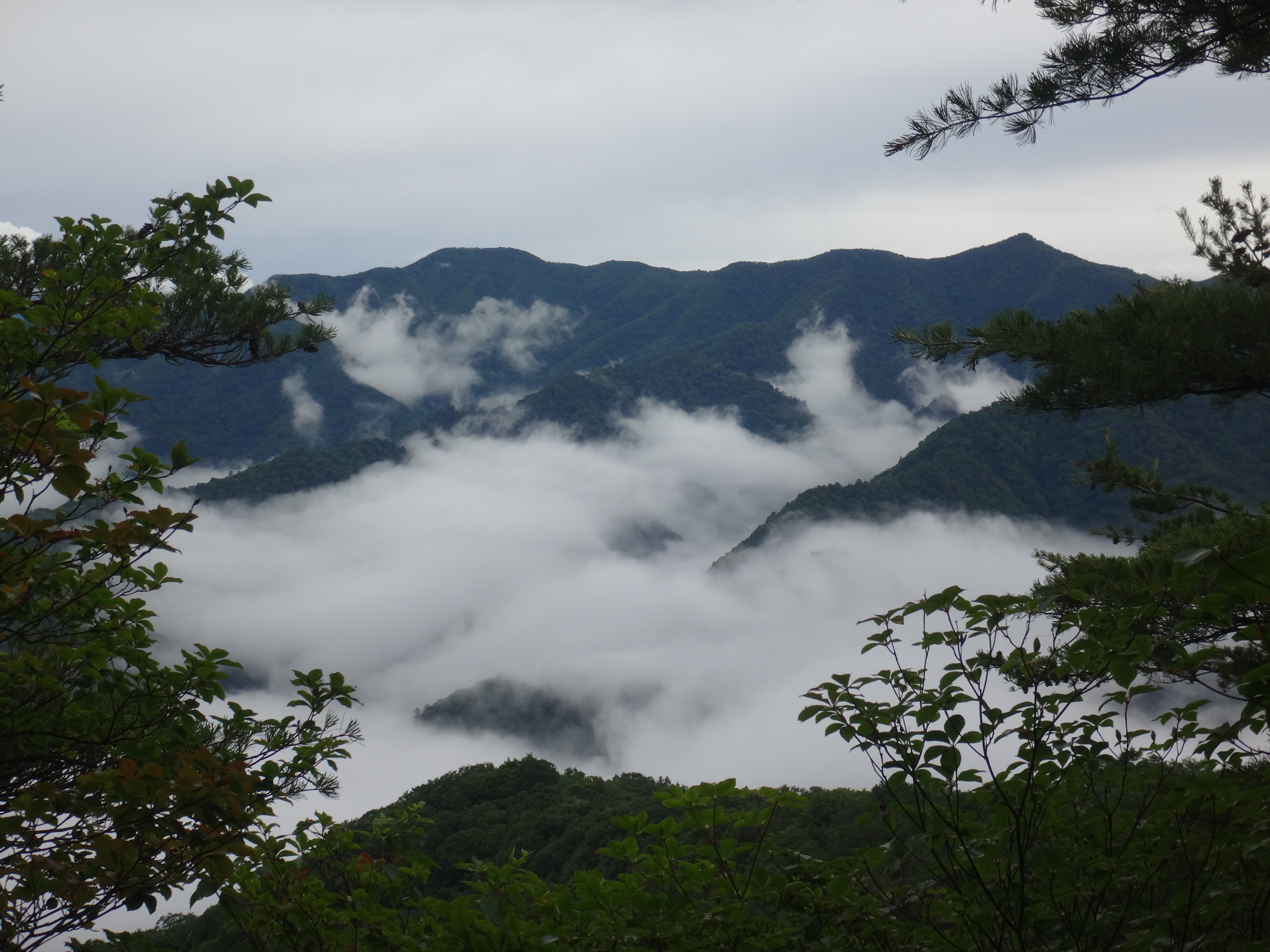
Mount Osutaka

The plane crash of Japan Air Lines Flight 123 on 12 August 1985 was initially reported on Mount Osutaka, but later confirmed to be on a ridge near Mount Takamagahara. With the loss of 520 people, it remains the deadliest single-plane accident in world history.
