= Kitaaiki =

Kitaaiki 北相木村
- Village
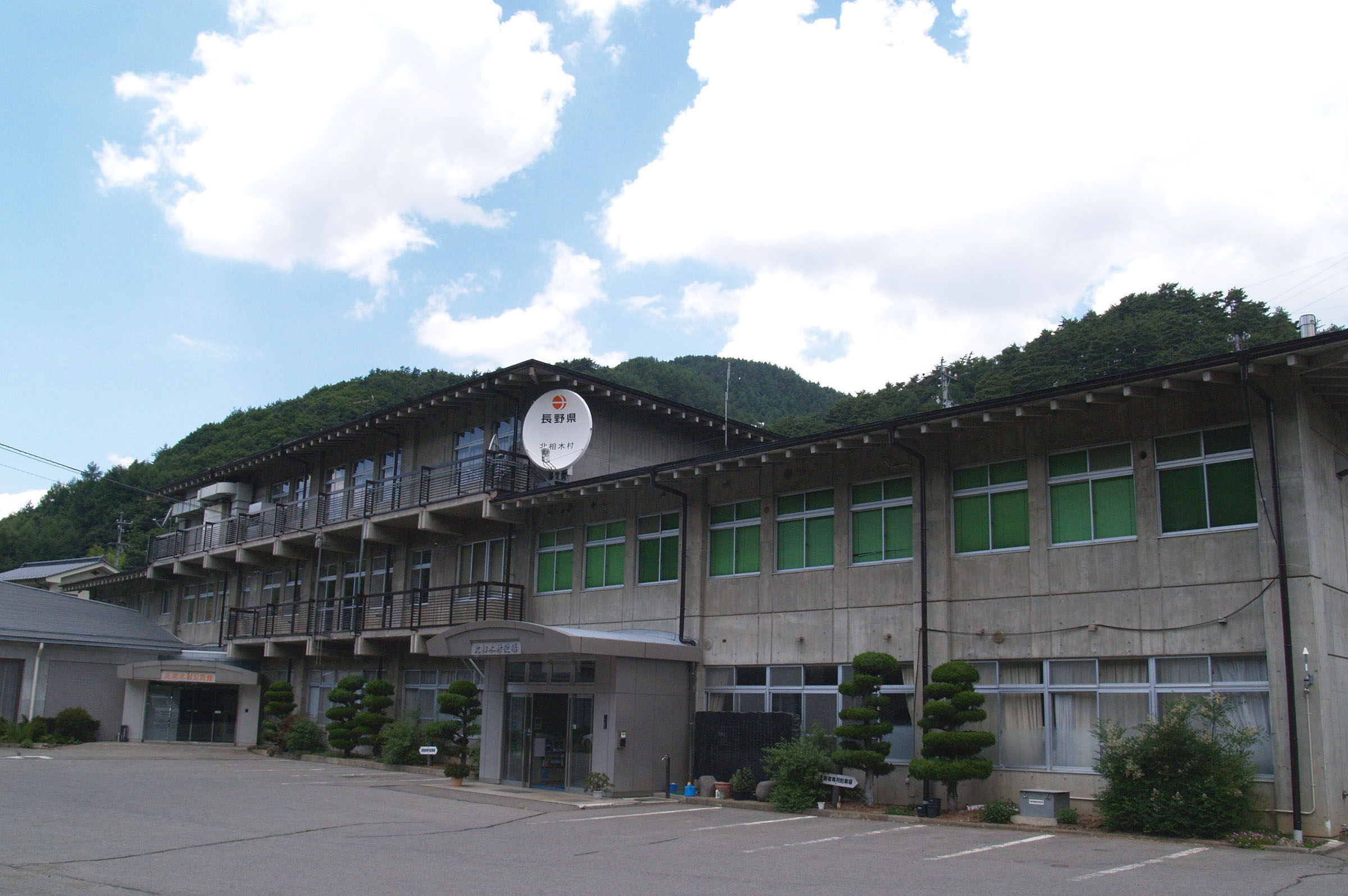
- Kitaaiki Town Hall

- Flag Seal

- Location of Kitaaiki in Nagano Prefecture

- Coordinates: 36°3′33.1″N 138°33′4.2″E
- Country: Japan
- Region: Chūbu (Kōshin'etsu)
- Prefecture: Nagano
- District: Minamisaku

Area
  - Total: 56.32 km^{2} (21.75 sq mi)

Population (April 2019)
  - Total: 755
  - Density: 13.4/km^{2} (34.7/sq mi)
- Time zone: UTC+9 (Japan Standard Time)
- Symbols
  - Tree: Larch
  - Flower: Rhododendron
  - Bird: Copper pheasant
- Phone number: 0267-77-2111
- Address: 2774 Kitaaiki-mura, Minamisaku-gun, Nagano-ken 384-1201
- Website: Official website

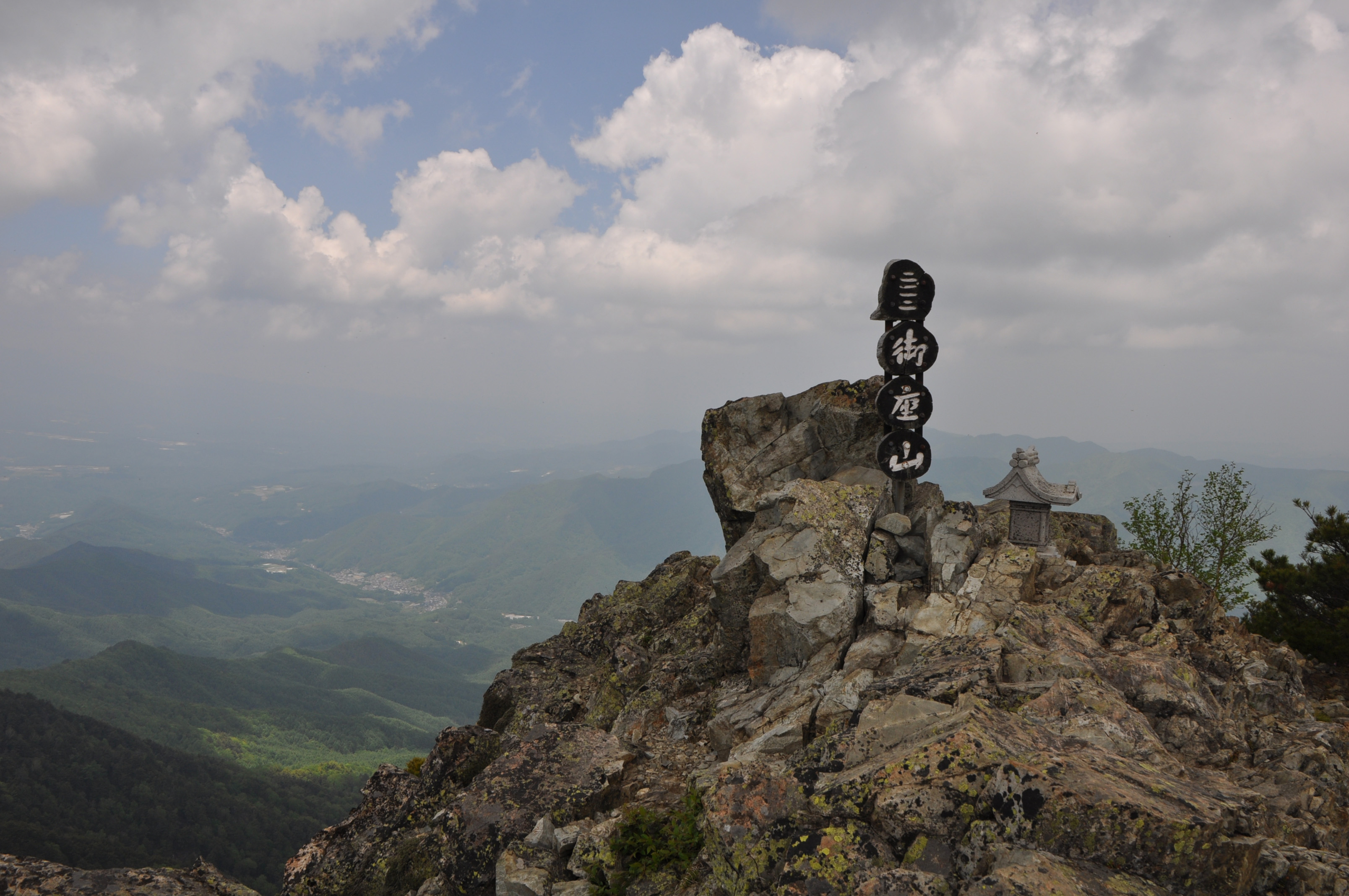
Summit of Mount Ogura

Kitaaiki (北相木村, Kitaaiki-mura) is a village located in Nagano Prefecture, Japan. As of 1 April 2019, the village had an estimated population of 755 in 350 households, and a population density of 13 persons per km^{2}. The total area of the village is 56.32 square kilometres (21.75 sq mi).

== Geography ==
Kitaaiki is located in mountainous eastern Nagano Prefecture, bordered by Gunma Prefecture to the east. More than 90% of the village area is covered by mountains and forest. Mount Ogura (2,112 meters) is the highest point in the village.

=== Surrounding municipalities ===
- Gunma Prefecture
  - Ueno
- Nagano Prefecture
  - Koumi
  - Minamiaiki
  - Sakuho

=== Climate ===
The village has a humid continental climate characterized by hot and humid summers, and cold winters (Köppen climate classification Dfb). The average annual temperature in Kitaaiki is 7.5 °C. The average annual rainfall is 1513 mm with September as the wettest month. The temperatures are highest on average in August, at around 20.2 °C, and lowest in January, at around −4.7 °C.

== Demographics ==
Per Japanese census data, the population of Kitaaiki has decreased over the past 70 years and is now less than a third of what it was in 1950.

Historical population
Year	Pop.	±%
1940	1,871	—
1950	2,262	+20.9%
1960	2,104	−7.0%
1970	1,787	−15.1%
1980	1,299	−27.3%
1990	1,194	−8.1%
2000	1,025	−14.2%
2010	843	−17.8%
2020	752	−10.8%

== History ==
The area of present-day Kataaiki was part of ancient Shinano Province, and was mentioned in Muromachi period records. The present village of Kitaaiki was created with the establishment of the modern municipalities system on April 1, 1889.

== Education ==
Kitaaiki has one public elementary school operated by the village government. The village shares a public middle school with neighboring Minamiaika. The village does not have a high school.

== Transportation ==
=== Railway ===
- The village does not have any passenger rail service.

=== Highway ===
- The village is not served by any national highways

== Local attractions ==
- Tochibaraiwakage ruins, a Jomon period National Historic Site
