= Mount Takamagahara =

Mountain in Japan

Coordinates: 35°59′31″N 138°41′19″E

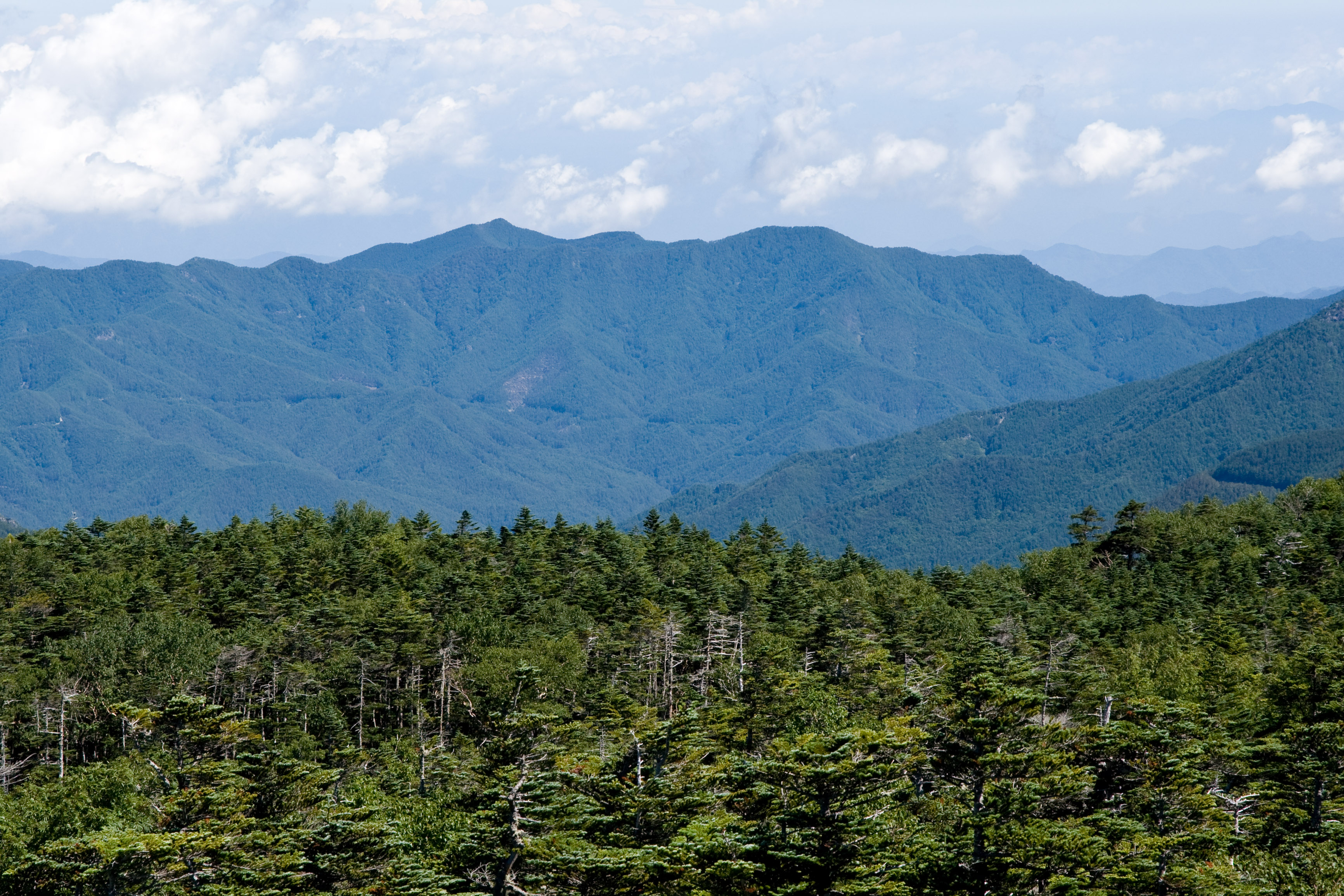
Mt. Takamagahara

Mount Takamagahara (高天原山, Takamagahara-yama) is a mountain in the Gunma Prefecture of Japan, near Ueno village. It is 1,978.6 metres (6,491 ft 6 in) tall. Takamagahara is the world of the deities of the sky in Japanese mythology.

The crash of Japan Air Lines Flight 123 on 12 August 1985 was initially reported on Mount Osutaka, but later confirmed to be on the ridge of Mount Takamagahara at a height of approximately 1,565 metres (5,135 ft) above sea level. With the loss of 520 people, it remains the deadliest single-aircraft accident in aviation history.

This area was later renamed as Osutaka no One ("Mountain Ridge of Mount Osutaka") by the village mayor of Ueno, Takeo Kurosawa (Former Imperial Japanese Navy Lt Cdr). There is a shrine on the summit of the ridge to commemorate the lives lost in the crash of Flight 123. The mountain road to the shrine was constructed as part of a compensation package from JAL.

== See also ==
- Takamagahara - a place of Japanese mythology
