= Minamikanra District, Gunma =

Former district in Gunma prefecture, Japan

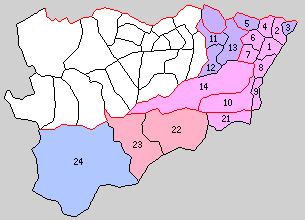
Historic Map of Tano District: 1. Fujioka, 2. Kanna, 3. Shin, 4. Ono, 5. Yawata, 6. Midori, 7. Hirai, 8. Mikuri, 9. Onishi, 10. Sanbagawa, 11.Yoshii, 12.Tago, 13. Irino, 14. Hino, 21. Mihara, 22. Kamikawa, 23. Nakasato, 24. Ueno: areas 21 through 24 were formerly Minamikanra District

Minamikanra District (南甘楽郡, Minamikanra-gun) was formerly a rural district located in Gunma Prefecture, Japan. Parts of the modern cities of Takasaki and Fujioka were formerly within the district.

Kanra District was the name of one of the ancient districts of Kōzuke Province, mentioned in the Shoku Nihongi of 711 AD. Modern Minamikanra District was created on December 7, 1878, with the reorganization of Gunma Prefecture into districts. It included 25 villages, which were formerly part of the tenryō holdings in Kōzuke Province administered directly by the Tokugawa shogunate. With the establishment of the municipalities system on April 1, 1889, the area was organized as four villages: Mihara, Nakasato, Kamikawa, and Ueno.

On April 1, 1896, the district was merged with Tago, Midono to form Tano District.

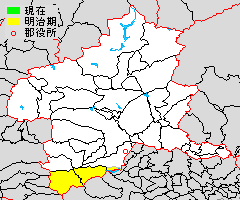
Map showing location of Minamikanra District within Gunma Prefecture
