= Kōzuke Province =

Former province of Japan

Map of Japanese provinces (1868) with Kōzuke Province highlighted

Kōzuke Province (上野国, Kōzuke no Kuni; Japanese pronunciation: [kó̞ò̞.(d͡)zɨ̀.kè̞ (nò̞ kɯ̈̀.ɲ̟ì)]) was a province of Japan in the area of Japan that is today Gunma Prefecture. Kōzuke bordered Echigo, Shinano, Musashi and Shimotsuke Provinces. Its abbreviated form name was Jōshū (上州; [d͡ʑó̞ò̞.ɕɨ̀ɨ̀]). Under the Engishiki classification system, Kōzuke was ranked as one of the 13 "great countries" (大国) in terms of importance, and one of the 30 "far countries" (遠国) in terms of distance from the imperial capital, Kyoto. The provincial capital is located in what is now the city of Maebashi; however, its exact location remains uncertain. The ichinomiya of the province is located in what is now the city of Tomioka.

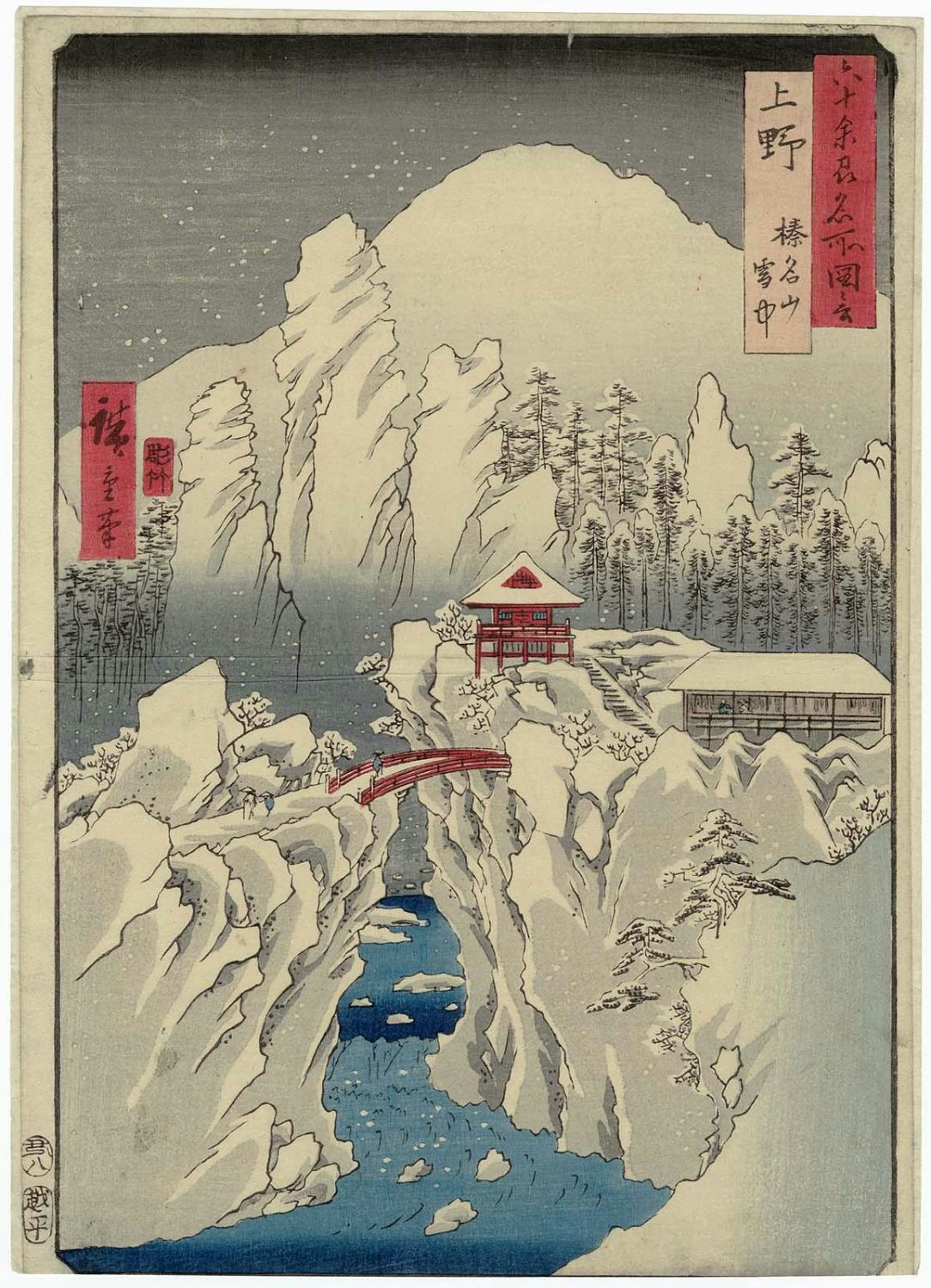
Hiroshige ukiyo-e " Kōzuke " in "The Famous Scenes of the Sixty States" (六十余州名所図会), depicting Mount Haruna Under Snow

== History ==
During the 4th century AD, (Kofun period) the area of modern Gunma and Tochigi prefectures were known as Keno or Kenu (毛野), literally "hairy field", but used as ateji for 食野 or "food field" in reference to an imperial agricultural area. At some unknown point in the 5th century, the area was divided at the Kinugawa River into Kamitsukeno (上毛野) ("Upper Keno") and Shimotsukeno (下毛野) ("Lower Keno"). Per the Nara period Taihō Code, these provinces became Kamitsukeno-no-kuni (上毛野国) and Shimotsukeno-no-kuni (下毛野国). At some point, the no meaning "field" was reanalyzed as the possessive particle no, resulting in shortened names (without the Kuni (国) or "province" portion) of Kamitsuke and Shimotsuke. In 713, with the standardization of province names into two kanji, these names became Kamitsuke (上野) and Shimotsuke (下野). Later regular sound changes caused Kamitsuke to shift to Kaudzuke, and then to modern Kōzuke.

During the Heian period, from the year 811, Kōzuke (along with Hitachi and Kazusa) was one of the three provinces where an Imperial Prince was designated as nominal ruler. The area was noted for its production of horses. The original capital of the province was located in what is now Maebashi, along with the kokubun-ji and the sōja of the province. The ichinomiya was located in what is now the city of Tomioka.

During the Sengoku period, Kōzuke was contested between the later Hōjō clan, the Takeda and the Uesugi clans. After the establishment of the Tokugawa Shogunate, much of the province was assigned to several feudal domains. The Nakasendō and the Mikuni Kaidō highways passed through the province, and numerous post stations were established.

Following the Meiji restoration, the various domains became prefectures with the abolition of the han system in 1871. These various prefectures merged to form Gunma Prefecture in 1876. The area subsequently prospered with the development of sericulture and silk spinning industries.

== Historical districts ==
- Gunma Prefecture
  - Agatsuma District (吾妻郡)
  - Gunma District (群馬郡)
    - Higashigunma District (東群馬郡) - merged with Minamiseta District to become the 2nd incarnation of Seta District (勢多郡) on April 1, 1896
    - Nishigunma District (西群馬郡) - merged with Kataoka District to become the 2nd incarnation of Gunma District (群馬郡) on April 1, 1896
  - Kanra District (甘楽郡)
    - Kitakanra District (北甘楽郡) - renamed as Kanra District (甘楽郡) on April 1, 1950
    - Minamikanra District (南甘楽郡) - merged with Midono and Tago Districts to become Tano District (多野郡) on April 1, 1896
  - Kataoka District (片岡郡) - merged with Nishigunma District to become the 2nd incarnation of Gunma District on April 1, 1896
  - Kitagunma District (北群馬郡) - split off from Gunma District on October 1, 1949
  - Midono District (緑野郡) - merged with Minamikanra and Tago Districts to become Tano District on April 1, 1896
  - Nawa District (佐波郡) - merged with Sai District to become Sawa District (佐波郡) on April 1, 1896
  - Nitta District (新田郡) - dissolved
  - Ōra District (邑楽郡)
  - Sai District (佐波郡) - merged with Nawa District to become Sawa District on April 1, 1896
  - Seta District (勢多郡)
    - Kitaseta District (北勢多郡) - merged into Tone District on April 1, 1896
    - Minamiseta District (南勢多郡) - merged with Higashigunma District to become the 2nd incarnation of Seta District on April 1, 1896
  - Tago District (多胡郡) - merged with Minamikanra and Midono Districts to become Tano District on April 1, 1896
  - Tone District (利根郡) - absorbed Kitaseta District on April 1, 1896
  - Usui District (碓氷郡) - dissolved
  - Yamada District (山田郡) – dissolved

== Bakumatsu period domains ==
Name	type	daimyō	kokudaka	notes
Maebashi Domain	fudai	Matsudaira	170,000 koku	
Takasaki Domain	fudai	Ōkochi-Matsudaira	82,000 koku	
Tatebayashi Domain	fudai	Akimoto	63,000 koku	
Numata Domain	fudai	Toki	35,000 koku	
Annaka Domain	fudai	Itakura	30,000 koku	
Obata Domain	fudai	Okudaira-Matsudaira	20,000 koku	
Isesaki Domain	fudai	Sakai	20,000 koku	
Yoshii Domain	shimpan	Takatsukasa	12,000 koku	
Nanukaichi Domain	tozama	Maeda	10,000 koku	
