= Tano District, Gunma =

Rural district in Gunma, Japan

Location of Tano District in Gunma Prefecture

Tano District (多野郡, Tano-gun) is a rural district located in Gunma Prefecture, Japan. As of January 2015, the district had an estimated population of 3,272 and an area of 296.45 km^{2}, with a population density of 11 people per square kilometer.

== Towns and villages ==
- Kanna
- Ueno

Parts of the city of Takasaki and all of the city of Fujioka were formerly part of the district.

== History ==
Tano District was created on April 1, 1896 by the merger of the former districts of Minamikanra, Tago and Midono. At the time of its creation, the district had four towns (Yoshii, Fujioka, Onishi and Shin) and 14 villages.

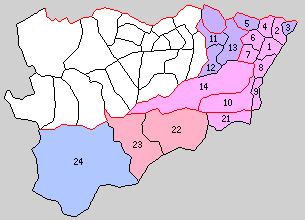
Historic Map of Tano District: 1. Fujioka, 2. Kanna, 3. Shin, 4. Ono, 5. Yawata, 6. Midori, 7. Hirai, 8. Mikuri, 9. Onishi, 10. Sanbagawa, 11.Yoshii, 12.Tago, 13. Irino, 14. Hino, 21. Mihara, 22. Kamikawa, 23. Nakasato, 24. Ueno

- 1926, April 1 – Kamikawa village was raised to town status; renamed Mamba Town
- 1954, April 1 – Fujioka annexed Kanna, Ono, Midori and Mikuri villages and was elevated to city status
- 1954, October 1 – Onishi annexed neighboring Mihara, and Sanbagawa villages
- 1955, January 1 – Yoshii annexed Tago, Irino villages and Iwadaira village from Kanra District
- 1955, March 1 – Fujioka annexed Hirai, Hino villages
- 1956, September 30 – Yawata village was annexed by Takasaki City
- 2003, April 1 – Manba town and Nakasato village merged, forming Kanna Town
- 2006, January 1 – Onishi town was annexed by Fujioka City
- 2006, January 23 – Shinmachi was annexed by Takasaki City
- 2009, June 1 – Yoshii Town was annexed by Takasaki City
