= Ueno Dam =

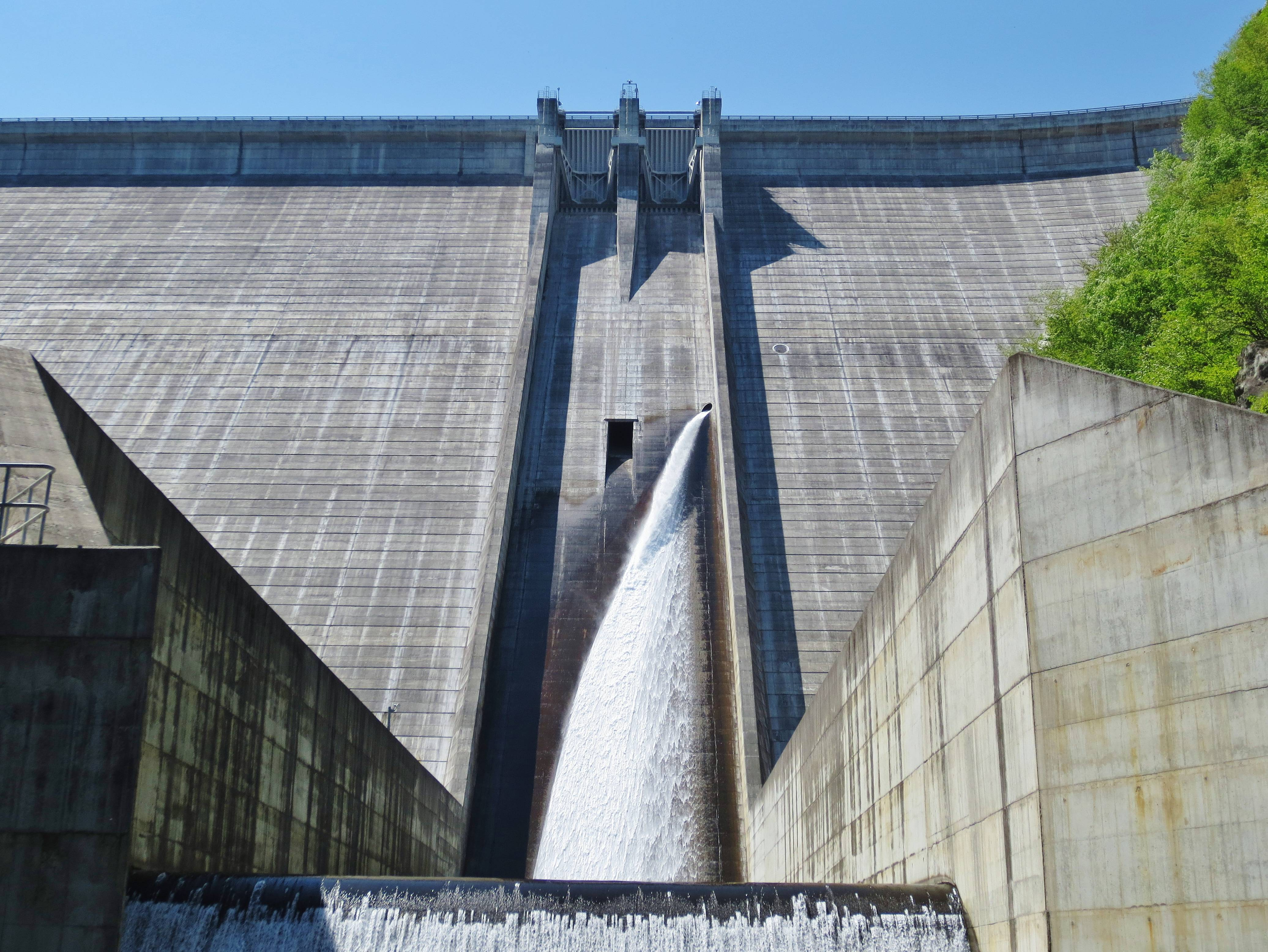
- Interactive map of Ueno Dam
- Location: Ueno, Gunma, Japan
- Coordinates: 36.05173°N 138.705056°E
- Construction began: 1997
- Opening date: 2005

Dam and spillways
- Type of dam: Gravity
- Impounds: Kanna River
- Height: 120 m (390 ft)
- Length: 350 m (1,150 ft)

Reservoir
- Creates: Lake Okukanna
- Total capacity: 18,400,000 m^{3} (650,000,000 cu ft)
- Catchment area: 31.2 km^{2} (12.0 sq mi)
- Surface area: 56 hectares

Kanagawa River Power Plant
- Type: Pumped-storage

Ueno Dam (上野ダム) is a concrete gravity dam in the Gunma Prefecture of Japan. The dam serves as the lower reservoir of the Kannagawa Hydropower Plant, a pumped-storage generation system. Because of the dam's remote location deep in the hillside, no houses were submerged.

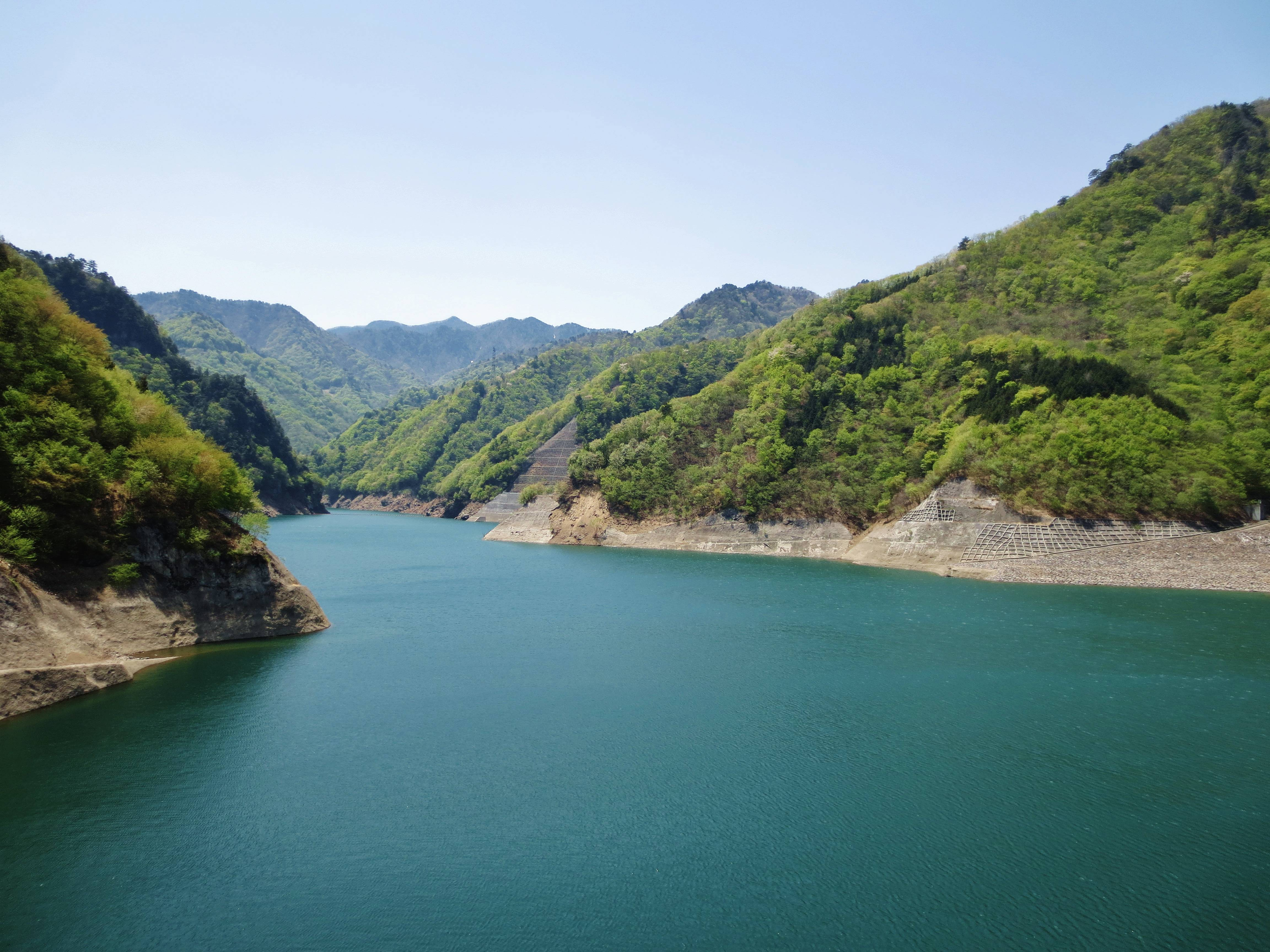
Lake Okukanna
