= Japan National Route 462 =

Road in Japan

National Route 462
- 国道462号
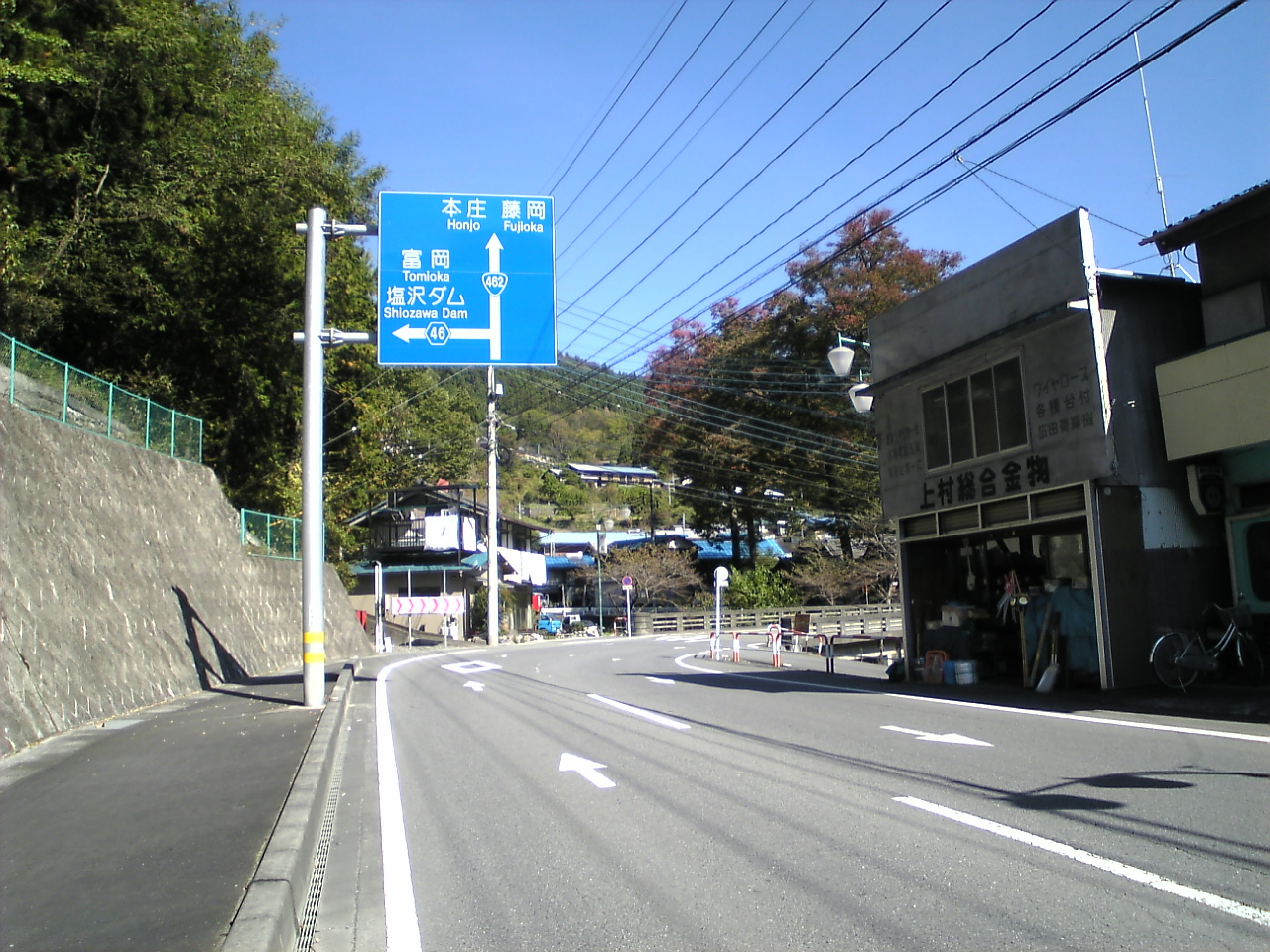

Route information
- Length: 114.6 km (71.2 mi)

Location
- Country: Japan

Highway system
- National highways of Japan; Expressways of Japan
← National Route 461	→ National Route 463

National Route 462 is a national highway of Japan connecting Saku, Nagano and Isesaki, Gunma in Japan, with a total length of 114.6 km (71.21 mi).

== Route description ==
A section of National Route 462 in the town of Kanna in Gunma Prefecture is a musical road.
