= Midono District, Gunma =

Former rural district in Japan

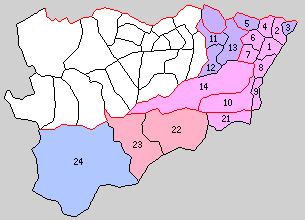
Historic Map of Tano District: 1. Fujioka, 2. Kanna, 3. Shin, 4. Ono, 5. Yawata, 6. Midori, 7. Hirai, 8. Mikuri, 9. Onishi, 10. Sanbagawa, 11.Yoshii, 12.Tago, 13. Irino, 14. Hino, 21. Mihara, 22. Kamikawa, 23. Nakasato, 24. Ueno: areas 1 through 10 were formerly Midono District

Midono District (緑野郡, Midono-gun) was formerly a rural district located in Gunma Prefecture, Japan. Parts of the modern cities of Takasaki and Fujioka were formerly within the district.

Midono District was created on December 7, 1878, with the reorganization of Gunma Prefecture into districts. It included three towns (Ochiai-Shin, Fueki-Shin and Fujioka) and 42 villages, almost all of which were formerly part of the tenryō holdings in Kōzuke Province administered directly by the Tokugawa shogunate. With the establishment of the municipalities system on April 1, 1889, the area was organized as three towns (Fujioka, Onishi and Shin) and seven villages.

On April 1, 1896, the district was merged with Minamikanra, Tago to form Tano District.

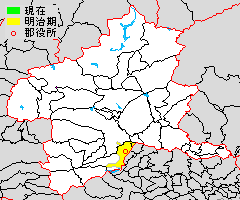
Location of Midono District within Gunma Prefecture
