= Minamiaiki, Nagano =

Minamiaiki 南相木村
- Village
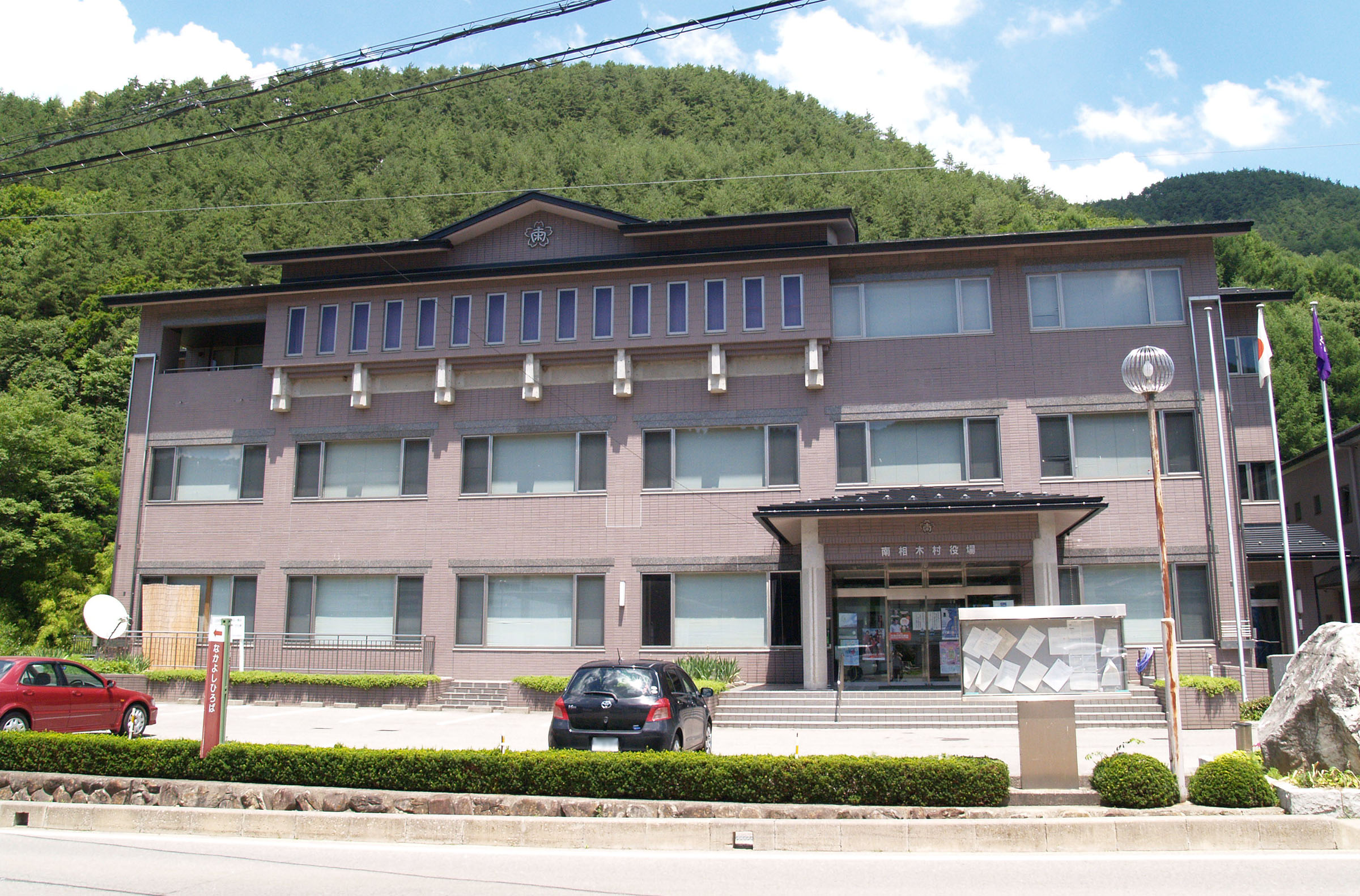
- Minamiaiki Village Hall

- Flag Seal

- Location of Minamiaiki in Nagano Prefecture

- Coordinates: 36°2′9.7″N 138°32′48.8″E
- Country: Japan
- Region: Chūbu (Kōshin'etsu)
- Prefecture: Nagano
- District: Minamisaku

Area
  - Total: 66.05 km^{2} (25.50 sq mi)

Population (April 2016)
  - Total: 1,057
  - Density: 16.00/km^{2} (41.45/sq mi)
- Time zone: UTC+9 (Japan Standard Time)
- Symbols
  - Tree: Pinus densiflora
  - Flower: Prunus serrulata
  - Bird: Japanese bush warbler
- Phone number: 0267-78-2121
- Address: 3525-1 Minamiaiki-mura, Minamisaku-gun, Nagano-ken 384-1211
- Website: Official website

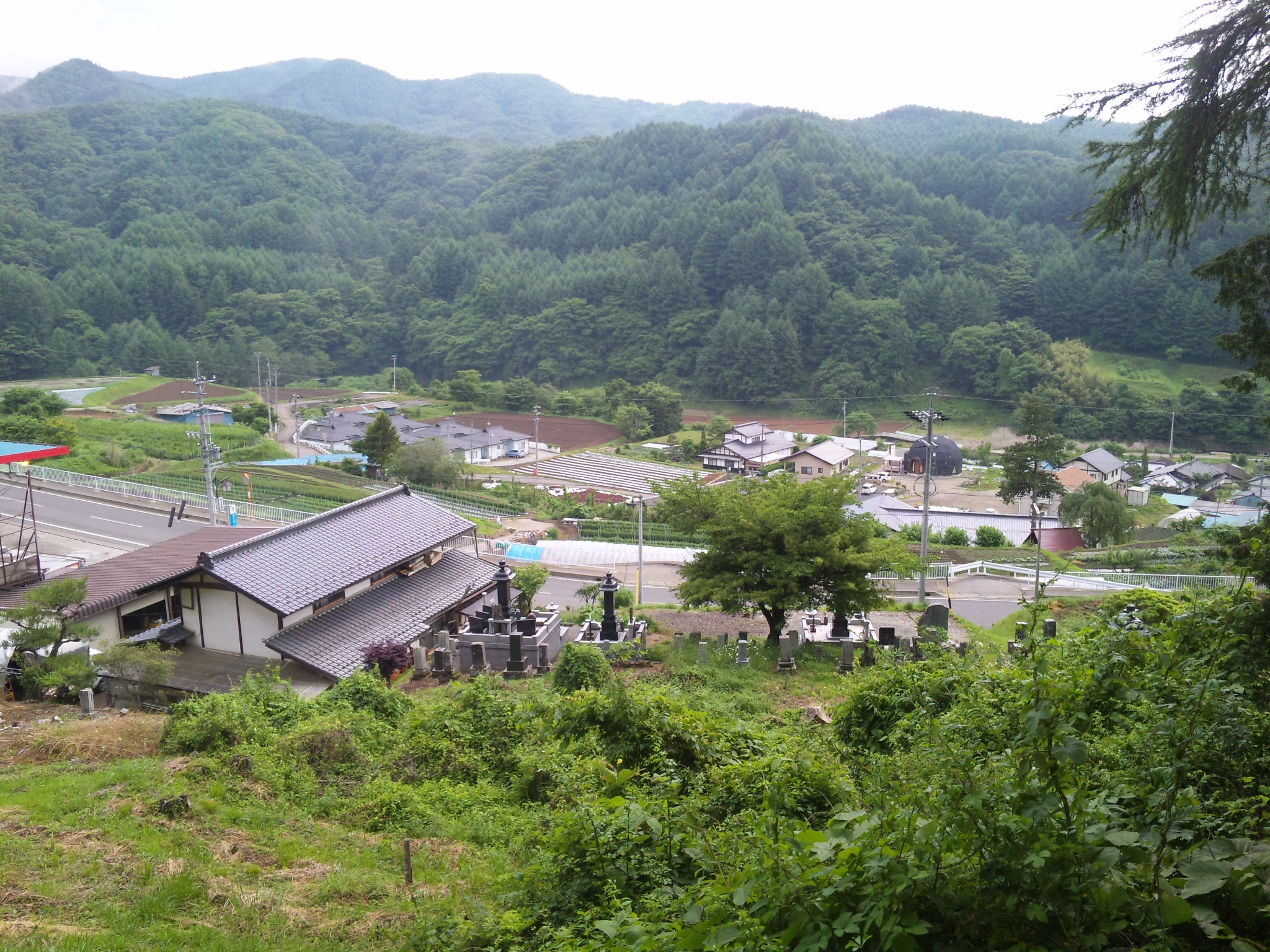
Minamiaiki village

Minamiaiki (南相木村, Minamiaiki-mura) is a village located in Nagano Prefecture, Japan. As of 1 April 2019, the village had an estimated population of 1,057 in 430 households, and a population density of 16 persons per km^{2}. The total area of the village is 66.05 square kilometres (25.50 sq mi).

== Geography ==
Minamiaiki is located in mountainous eastern Nagano Prefecture, bordered by Gunma Prefecture to the east. More than 90% of the village area is covered by mountains and forest, and the village is at an average altitude of between 1000 and 1200 meters. Minamiaiki Dam is located within this village.

=== Surrounding municipalities ===
- Gunma Prefecture
  - Ueno
- Nagano Prefecture
  - Kawakami
  - Kitaaiki
  - Koumi
  - Minamimaki

=== Climate ===
The village has a humid continental climate characterized by warm and humid summers, and cold winters (Köppen climate classification Dfb). The average annual temperature in Minamiaiki is 7.4 °C. The average annual rainfall is 1537 mm with September as the wettest month. The temperatures are highest on average in August, at around 20.1 °C, and lowest in January, at around -4.7 °C.

== Demographics ==
Per Japanese census data, the population of Minamiaiki has declined by more than half since its peak around 1950.

Historical population
Year	Pop.	±%
1940	2,261	—
1950	2,672	+18.2%
1960	2,421	−9.4%
1970	2,009	−17.0%
1980	1,604	−20.2%
1990	1,368	−14.7%
2000	1,584	+15.8%
2010	1,122	−29.2%
2020	962	−14.3%

== History ==
The area of present-day Minamiaiki was part of ancient Shinano Province, and was mentioned in Muromachi period records. The area was part of the tenryō territories under the direct administration of the Tokugawa shogunate during the Edo period. The present village of Minamiaiki was created with the establishment of the modern municipalities system on April 1, 1889.

== Education ==
Minamiaiki has one public elementary school operated by the village government. The village shares a public middle school with neighboring Kitaaika. The village does not have a high school.

== Transportation ==
=== Railway ===
- The village does not have any passenger rail service.

=== Highway ===
- The village is not served by any national highways.

== Notable people ==
- Yoji Nakajima, wheelchair curler
