= Tago District, Gunma =

Former district in Gunma prefecture, Japan

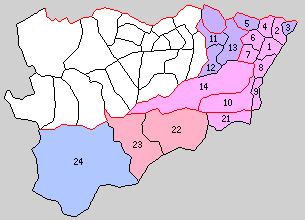
Historic Map of Tano District: 1. Fujioka, 2. Kanna, 3. Shin, 4. Ono, 5. Yawata, 6. Midori, 7. Hirai, 8. Mikuri, 9. Onishi, 10. Sanbagawa, 11.Yoshii, 12.Tago, 13. Irino, 14. Hino, 21. Mihara, 22. Kamikawa, 23. Nakasato, 24. Ueno: areas 11 through 14 were formerly Midono District

Tago District (多胡郡, Tago-gun) was formerly a rural district located in Gunma Prefecture, Japan. Parts of the modern cities of Takasaki and Fujioka were formerly within the district.

Tago District was the name of one of the ancient districts of Kōzuke Province, mentioned in the Shoku Nihongi of 711 AD. Modern Tago District was created on December 7, 1878, with the reorganization of Gunma Prefecture into districts. It included 19 villages, which were formerly part of the tenryō holdings in Kōzuke Province administered directly by the Tokugawa shogunate, seven villages that were part of the holdings of Yoshii Domain and three villages which were part of the holdings of Obama Domain. With the establishment of the municipalities system on April 1, 1889, the area was organized as one town (Yoshii) and three villages.

On April 1, 1896, the district was merged with Minamikanra and Midono to form Tano District.

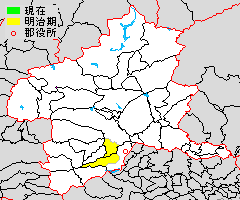
Location of Tago District within Gunma Prefecture
